= Three Rivers Park District =

Park district in the Twin Cities

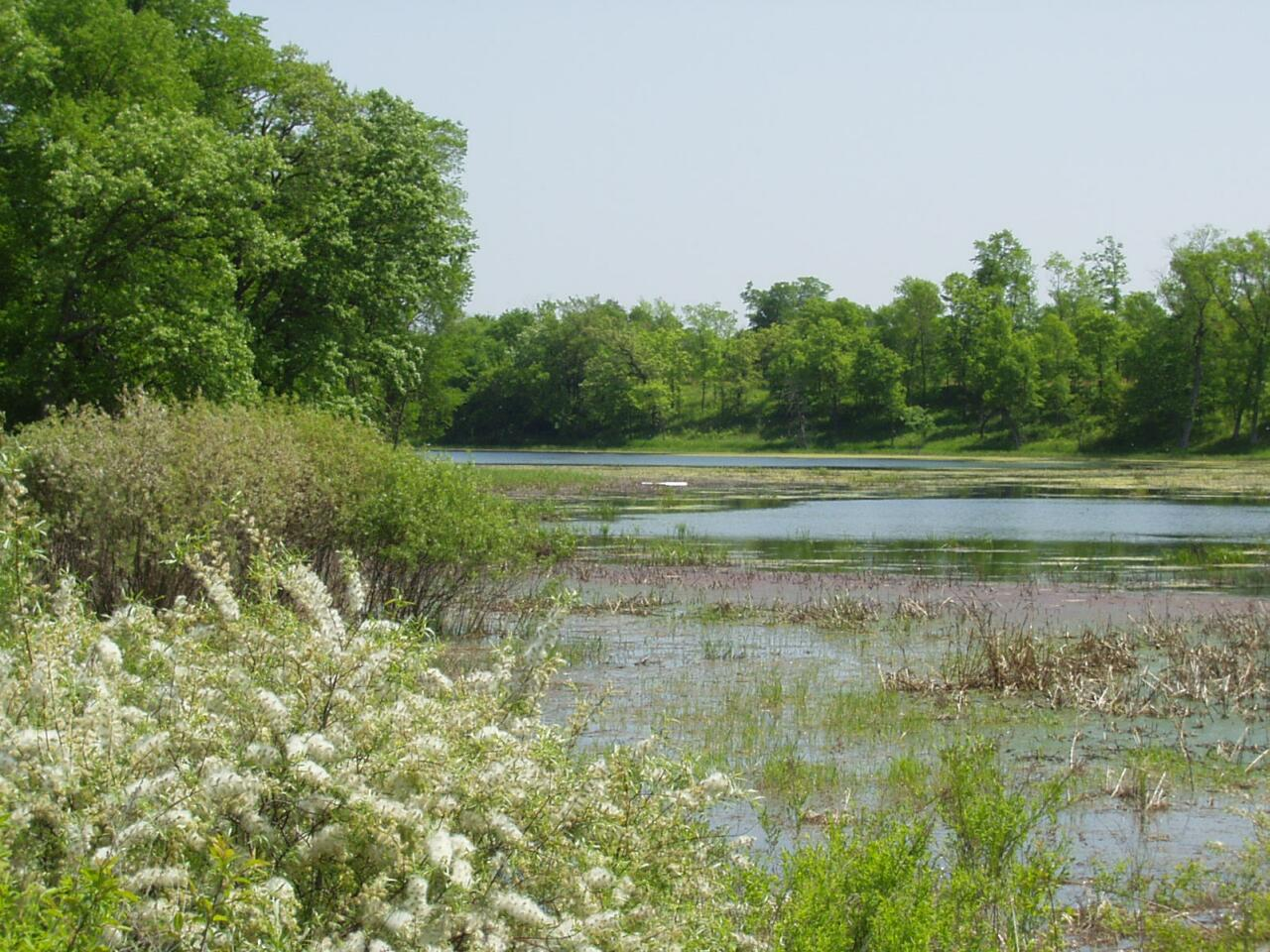
Crow-Hassan Park Reserve has miles of trails leading through woods and restored native prairie.

Three Rivers Park District is a special park district serving the suburban areas of the Twin Cities including suburban Hennepin, Carver, Dakota, Scott, and Ramsey counties. Three Rivers operates twenty parks and ten regional trails, with at least two more regional trails planned. Nearly seven million people visit Three Rivers facilities each year. It has over 27,000 acres (11,000 ha) of parks and trails.

== History ==
A park system in Hennepin County outside of Minneapolis was proposed as early as 1901, but it was not until 1955 that the Minnesota Legislature passed the legislation that cleared the way to establish the park system in 1957. It was then known as the Hennepin County Park Reserve District. In its first decade, the Park District purchased nearly 21,000 acres (8,500 ha) of property, mostly farmland in Hennepin County's fast-growing suburban areas. In 1967, the Park District began efforts to restore wetland, prairie, woodland, and wildlife habitat to their natural state before 19th-century settlement. The district's policy is now that at least 80% of the land in a park reserve must be maintained or restored to its natural state, with only 20% of the land or less developed for recreation. Not all the parks in the system are park reserves; some of the smaller or more-developed parks are "regional parks".

Beginning in the 1970s, the district's focus shifted from land acquisition to development. The building of recreational facilities including park buildings, beaches, boat launches, paved trails for hiking and biking, and cross-country ski trails began in earnest.

In 2001, the park system was renamed Three Rivers Park District to better reflect the areas it serves. Each of the Park District's facilities has watersheds that flow into three rivers: the Mississippi, Minnesota and Crow. These rivers have historically been and continue to be significant in the lives of the region's residents.

The park district is governed by a seven-member board of commissioners, of which five are elected by Hennepin County districts and two are appointed by Hennepin County commissioners.

== Parks ==
Most Three Rivers Park District parks are open from 5 a.m. through 10 p.m.

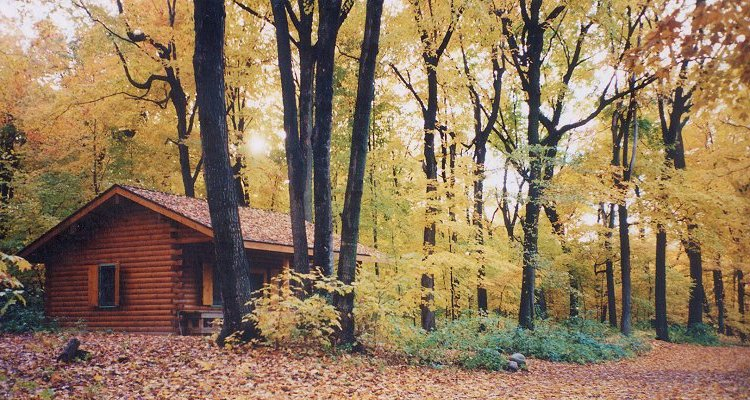
One of the cabins at the Baker Outdoor Learning Center

=== Baker Park Reserve ===
Baker Park Reserve, with an area of 3,313 acres (1,341 ha), is located in Medina, Minnesota. Its highlights include the Baker Outdoor Learning Center, available for use by families and groups, and Baker National Golf Course. It has eight miles (13 km) of paved biking/hiking trails. There is a mountain biking trail available by special-use permit in the winter.

=== Bryant Lake Regional Park ===
Bryant Lake Regional Park is located in Eden Prairie, Minnesota and has an area of 170 acres (69 ha). It features a swimming beach on Bryant Lake, a disc golf course, and a mix of paved and unpaved trails.

=== Carver Park Reserve ===
With an area of 3,719 acres (1,505 ha), Carver Park Reserve is the second-largest park reserve in the system. Located near Victoria, Minnesota, in Carver County, it features the Lowry Nature Center with interpretive programs, nine miles (14 km) of paved biking/hiking trails, 22 miles (35 km) of unpaved hiking trails, and nine miles (14 km) of horse trails. It is also connected to the Southwest LRT Trail's northern branch. The Grimm Farm Historic Site serves as a museum within the reserve.

=== Cleary Lake Regional Park ===
Cleary Lake Regional Park is located near Prior Lake, in Scott County. Its 1,186 acres (480 ha) contain a nine-hole golf course, an off-leash pet exercise area, and four miles (6.4 km) of paved biking/hiking trails.

=== Mississippi Gateway Regional Park ===
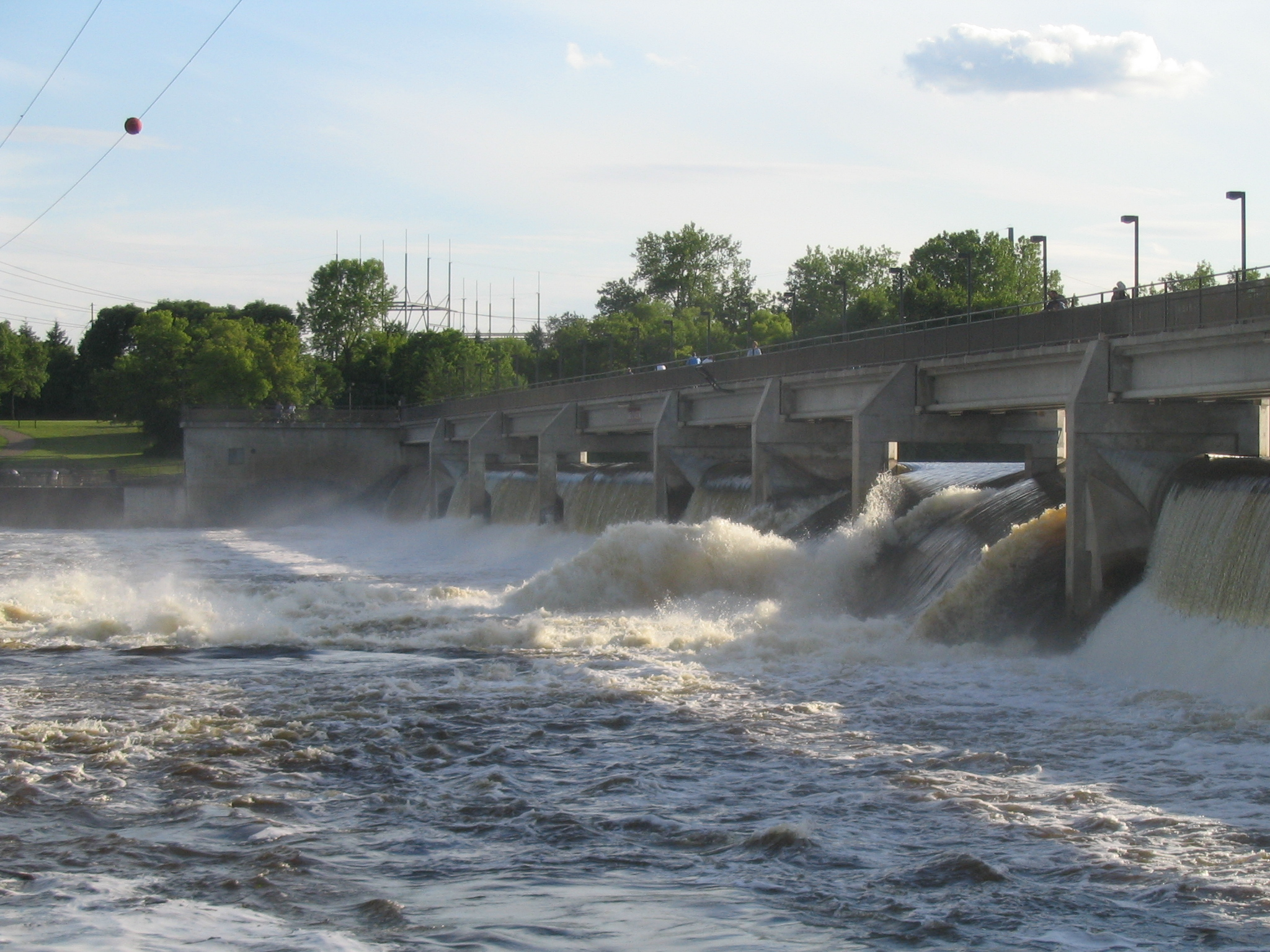
Coon Rapids Dam in June 2004

Mississippi Gateway Regional Park, formerly Coon Rapids Dam Regional Park, is located in Brooklyn Park, Minnesota and Coon Rapids, Minnesota. The dam, for which the park was named, was built by Northern States Power Company in 1913 for electrical power generation. Power generation was discontinued in 1966, so the dam is now used for recreation. Anoka County operates a park on its side of the dam. There is a pedestrian and bicycle walkway across the dam. It also connects to the Elm Creek Regional Trail, which stretches six miles (9.7 km) across Brooklyn Park and Maple Grove to meet up with Elm Creek Park Reserve. This park and the Coon Rapids Dam East, a walk across the dam, are sites for the National Parks Passport Program for the Mississippi National River and Recreation Area. The park has a staffed visitor center with restrooms. There are picnic shelters along the pedestrian trail. Various wildlife can be seen throughout the year.

=== Crow-Hassan Park Reserve ===
Located in Rogers, Minnesota, Crow-Hassan Park Reserve has an area of 2,597 acres (1,051 ha), including 600 acres (240 ha) of tallgrass prairie. The park features 18 miles (29 km) of unpaved hiking trails, 11 miles (18 km) of horse trails, and an off-leash dog area.

=== Eagle Lake Regional Park ===
Eagle Lake Regional Park is located in Plymouth, Minnesota and Maple Grove, Minnesota and features a nine-hole golf course with a lighted driving range.

=== Elm Creek Park Reserve ===
Elm Creek Park Reserve, at 5,315 acres (2,151 ha), is the largest park reserve in the system and occupies portions of Maple Grove, Champlin and Dayton. It features 19 miles (31 km) of paved biking/hiking trails, 21 miles (34 km) of horse trails, and a 13-mile (21 km) mountain bike trail. It also has a championship level disc golf course and a popular chlorinated swimming pond and a creative play area. Elm Creek also has a large fully fenced off-leash dog area.

A regional trail system connects Elm Creek Park Reserve to Fish Lake Regional Park and Mississippi Gateway Regional Park. In the winter, portions of the 11 miles (18 km) cross-country ski trail system are served by snowmaking. They also offer a snowtubing hill and a small downhill ski/snowboard area featuring a small terrain park. The Eastman Nature Center provides interpretive programs. This park also has more bike trails than all other parks in the park district, at 29.1 miles (46.8 km).

=== Fish Lake Regional Park ===
Fish Lake Regional Park is located in Maple Grove and offers boat access to Fish Lake, as well as a swimming beach and four-season pavilion. Also, there is a fully fenced, off-leash dog area.

=== Clifton E. French Regional Park ===
Located on Medicine Lake in Plymouth, Clifton E. French Regional Park (referred to locally as French Park) contains a popular creative play area and a large Nature Exploration Area, where patrons do not have to stay on paths and may do activities that are forbidden elsewhere in the park, such as digging or building forts. It also includes boat access to Medicine Lake. In the winter, it has six miles (9.7 km) of cross-country ski trails. The park is connected to Medicine Lake Regional Trail.

=== Gale Woods ===
Gale Woods, located on the shores of Whaletale Lake in Minnetrista, is a working farm featuring interpretive programs where visitors can learn about agriculture and land stewardship. The farm is home to the Gale Woods Folk School, which offers classes in cooking and the fiber arts. The park also includes a barn-style pavilion overlooking the lake.

=== Glen Lake Golf and Practice Center ===
Glen Lake Golf and Practice Center is located on the boundary of Minnetonka and Eden Prairie. It features a popular nine-hole golf course, along with a driving range and practice areas. It is built on the site of the former Glen Lake Sanatorium.

=== The Landing ===
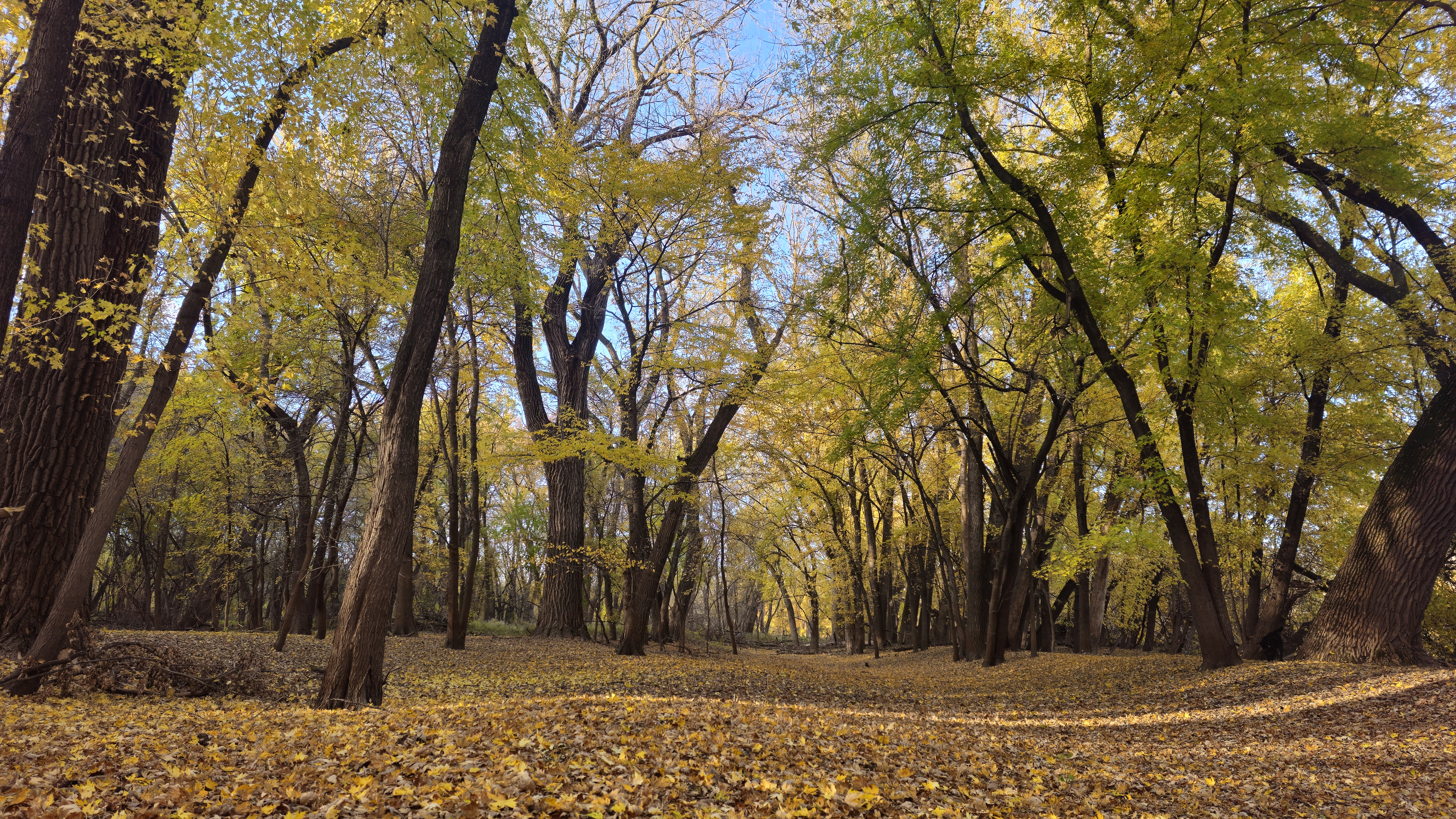
River walk trail at The Landing

The Landing – Minnesota River Heritage Park, formerly Historic Murphy's Landing, in Shakopee, is a regional park featuring a number of restored buildings from the 19th century. Buildings from the 1840s to the 1880s illustrate what life was like for some of Minnesota's earliest settlers along the Minnesota River. The site is open to the public daily for walking, biking and self-guided activities. Special programs take visitors inside the buildings. School groups tours are also available along with summer camps, and seasonal program offerings.

=== Hyland Lake Park Reserve ===
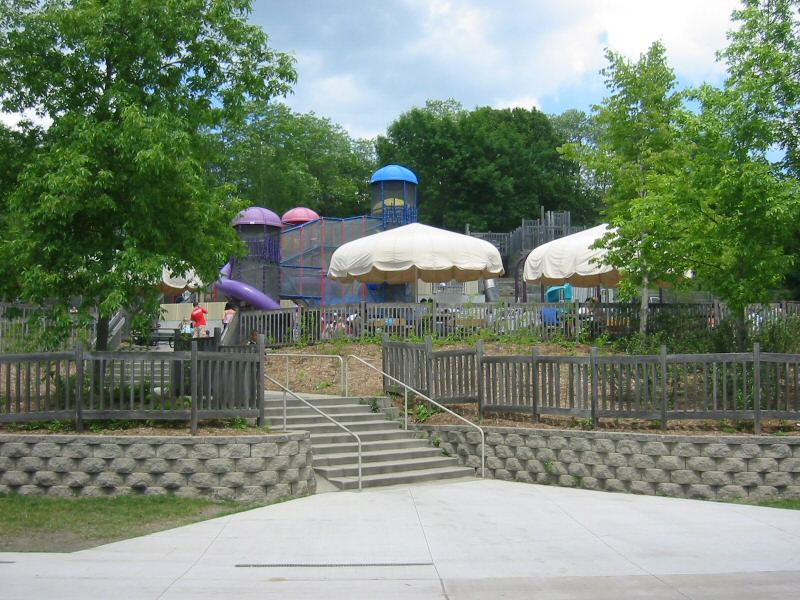
Play equipment in Hyland Lake Park Reserve

Hyland Lake Park Reserve, located in Bloomington, features the Hyland Hills Ski Area, a downhill ski area with two terrain parks. The park is home to a massive creative play area that is a favorite of local residents. The ski area is popular for lessons and for its proximity to the metro area. On Hyland Lake at the playground there is a chalet with a concessions stand and tables and chairs. During the winter the chalet has cross country ski rentals. The rest of the park reserve's 1,000 acres (400 ha) contain nine miles (14 km) of paved biking/hiking trails and other unpaved hiking trails. In addition, the park features an 18-hole championship-level disc golf course playing along the ski slopes. The visitor center offers boat and kayak rentals for use on Hyland Lake. In the winter, seven miles (11 km) of cross-country ski trails are offered, and some trails are lit for evening use. Hyland Lake Park Reserve also hosts Richardson Nature Center. The center offers live animal displays, interpretive nature programs and winter snowshoe rentals. The creative play in Hyland Lake Park Reserve features a wide variety of slides and other playground equipment. This playground is called "Chutes & Ladders" by Minnesotans because just the like the popular games its massive playground is mostly ladders leading to chutes "slides".

=== Lake Minnetonka Regional Park ===
Located in Minnetrista, Lake Minnetonka Regional Park is a relatively new park in the Three Rivers system. It offers a chlorinated sand-bottom swimming pond and a play area. It also provides boat access to Lake Minnetonka.

=== Lake Rebecca Park Reserve ===
Lake Rebecca Park Reserve, in Greenfield and Independence, is a large park reserve with 2,577 acres (1,043 ha). It offers seven miles (11 km) of biking/hiking trails, 13 miles (21 km) of unpaved hiking trails, and a 14-mile (23 km) mountain bike trail. It also has a non-motorized lake for canoeing, rowing, and fishing. In the winter, there are 10 miles (16 km) of cross-country ski trails.

=== Murphy-Hanrehan Park Reserve ===
Murphy-Hanrehan Park Reserve, in Burnsville, Lakeville, Savage, and Credit River Township, features a hilly cross-country ski trail system and a hilly 10-mile (16 km) singletrack mountain bike trail, maintained by Minnesota Off-Road Cyclists. The mountain bike trail is probably one of the most challenging trails in the Twin Cities due to its long climbs and rapid descents. The trail also includes natural and man-made obstacles such as rocks, wooden bridges, logs and stairsteps. The park reserve, at 2,786 acres (1,127 ha), also includes 14 miles (23 km) of horse trails, as well as bird watching. It is the only known nesting site of the hooded warbler in Minnesota. Also includes a hiking trail that is 3.1 miles (5.0 km) at the longest and 2.3 miles (3.7 km) at the shortest

=== Noerenberg Memorial Gardens ===
Noerenberg Memorial Gardens, located in Orono, is considered one of Minnesota's finest formal public gardens. It was donated to the park reserve by the estate of Frederick Noerenberg, founder of the Grain Belt brewery. The gardens are open May through October for tours, programs, informal viewing, and weddings. It includes the Noerenberg Estate Barn, listed on the National Register of Historic Places.

=== North Mississippi Regional Park ===
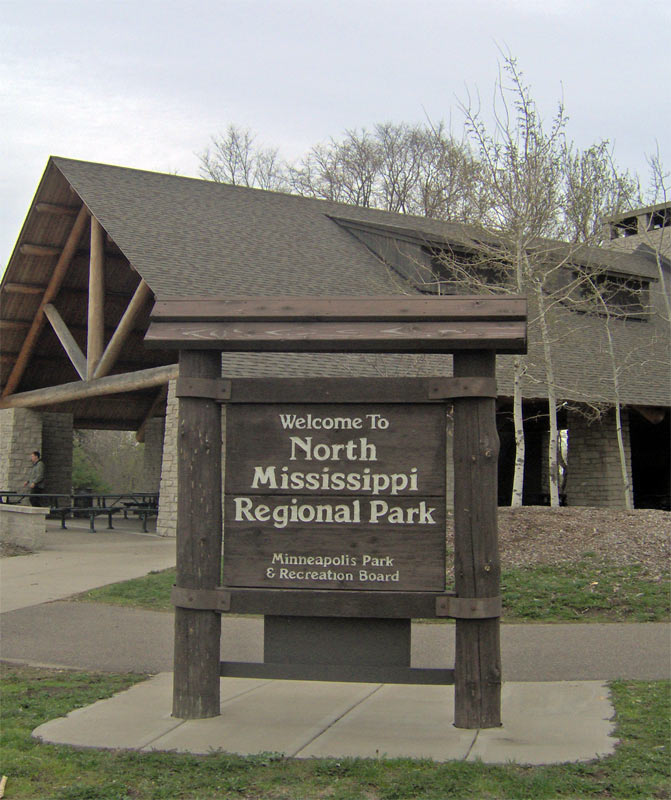
North Mississippi Regional Park

North Mississippi Regional Park is located on the west bank of the Mississippi River on the border of Minneapolis and Brooklyn Center. It has a scenic view of the river and surrounding woods, along with a paved biking/hiking trail that connects to the Minneapolis trail system and to the Anoka County Park trails that go north to the Coon Rapids Dam.

=== Silverwood Park ===
Silverwood is the park district's newest acquisition. Located on the northwest shore of Silver Lake in St. Anthony, it was formerly the site of the Salvation Army Silver Lake Camp. Picnicking, hiking trails and fishing are also available.

== Trails ==
=== Cedar Lake LRT Regional Trail ===
Cedar Lake LRT Regional Trail runs from downtown Minneapolis to Hopkins along former railroad lines. It connects to other trails including Luce Line Regional Trail, North Cedar Lake Regional Trail, and Minnesota River Bluffs LRT Regional Trail. It is part of the Southwest LRT Trail

=== Dakota Rail Regional Trail ===
The Dakota Rail Regional Trail follows the former Dakota Rail Corridor along the north side of Lake Minnetonka. The trail runs 13.5 miles (21.7 km) from Wayzata southwest to St. Bonifacius.

=== Lake Independence Regional Trail ===
The Lake Independence Regional Trail is a paved trail which runs from Crow-Hassan Park Reserve in Corcoran through Baker Park Reserve to the Luce Line State Trail in Orono.

=== Lake Minnetonka LRT Regional Trail ===
Lake Minnetonka LRT Regional Trail is a limestone trail which runs from Hopkins to Victoria, where it connects to Carver Park Reserve. It is part of the Southwest LRT Trail.

=== Luce Line Regional Trail ===
Luce Line Regional Trail is a paved trail which runs nine miles (14 km) from Theodore Wirth Park in Golden Valley to Plymouth, where it becomes the Luce Line State Trail. In Plymouth Luce Line Regional Trail connects with Medicine Lake Regional Trail.

=== Medicine Lake Regional Trail ===
Medicine Lake Regional Trail is a paved trail which runs from Elm Creek Park Reserve in Maple Grove to Luce Line Regional Trail on the south end of Medicine Lake. In between, the trail runs through Fish Lake Regional Park and Clifton E. French Regional Park. A short branch of the trail extends east of French Park into the surrounding neighborhood, ending at a city park.

=== Minnesota River Bluffs LRT Regional Trail ===
Minnesota River Bluffs LRT Regional Trail is a limestone trail which runs from Hopkins to Chanhassen along the former Minneapolis and St. Louis Railway line. In Hopkins the trail connects to Cedar Lake LRT Regional Trail and North Cedar Lake Regional Trail. It is part of the Southwest LRT Trail.

=== Nine Mile Creek Regional Trail ===
Nine Mile Creek Regional Trail is a paved trail which runs from the Cedar Lake LRT Regional Trail in Hopkins to the Nokomis-MN River Trail in Bloomington.

=== North Cedar Lake Regional Trail ===
North Cedar Lake Regional Trail is a paved trail which runs from Minneapolis to Hopkins, where it connects to Cedar Lake LRT Regional Trail and Minnesota River Bluffs LRT Regional Trail. North Cedar Lake Regional Trail forms part of the Cedar Lake Loop, along with Cedar Lake Regional Trail, Cedar Lake LRT Trail, Midtown Greenway, and the Kenilworth Trail.

=== Rush Creek Regional Trail ===
Rush Creek Regional Trail is a paved six-mile (9.7 km) trail which connects Elm Creek Park Reserve and Mississippi Gateway Regional Park. It also connects to Shingle Creek Regional Trail, although three rivers is planning on extending the trail to Crow Hassen regional park

=== Shingle Creek Regional Trail ===
Shingle Creek Regional Trail is a paved trail that runs from Rush Creek Regional Trail in Brooklyn Center down into Brooklyn Park, where it connects to local trails.

== Planned trails ==
=== Bassett Creek Regional Trail ===
Basset Creek Regional Trail is a paved trail that connects Clifton E. French Regional Park to Theodore Wirth Park.

=== Crystal Lake Regional Trail ===
Crystal Lake Regional Trail is a 8.6-mile paved trail from the Minneapolis Grand Rounds at Victory Memorial Parkway to Elm Creek Park Reserve. It largely runs parallel to the Bottineau Boulevard. It was constructed in several phases as Bottineau Boulevard itself was reconstructed.

== See also ==
- List of shared-use paths in Minneapolis
