= Hidden Beach (disambiguation) =

Hidden Beach may refer to:

== Organizations ==
- Hidden Beach Recordings, a company headquartered in Beverly Hills, California, United States

== Places ==
- Hidden Beach, a location within Islas Marietas National Park in Mexico
- Hidden Beach, the former name of Cedar Lake East Beach in Minneapolis, Minnesota, United States
