= Cedar Lake (Minneapolis) =

Lake in the state of Minnesota, United States

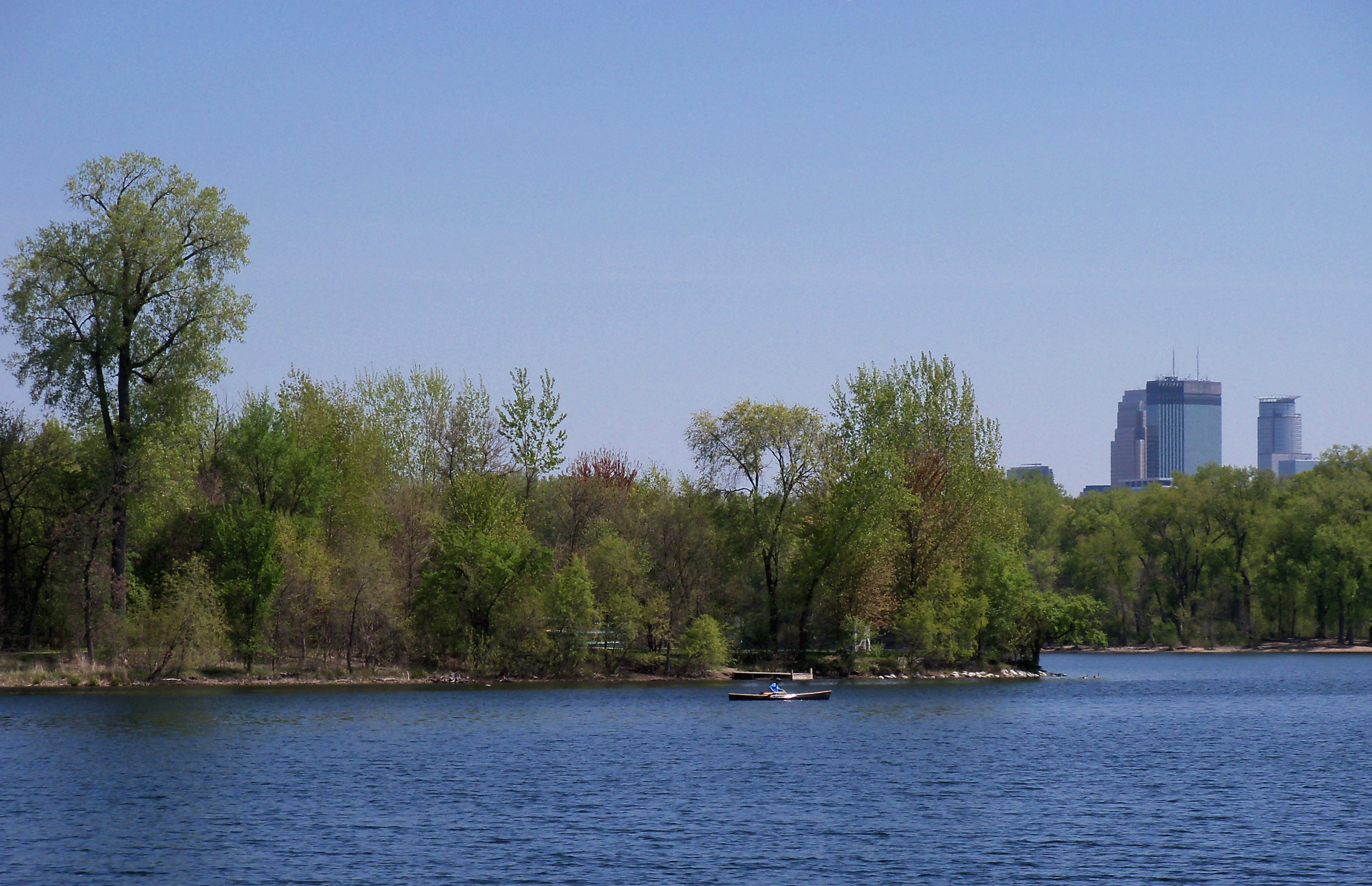
- Cedar Lake in 2012. Downtown Minneapolis skyline is visible in the background.
- Interactive map of Cedar Lake
- Location: Minneapolis, Minnesota, United States
- Coordinates: 44°57′37″N 093°19′16″W
- Part of: Chain of Lakes
- Basin countries: United States
- Surface area: 169 acres (68 ha)
- Max. depth: 51 ft (16 m)
- Surface elevation: 853 ft (260 m)

Cedar Lake is a lake in Minneapolis, Minnesota, United States, and part of the city's Chain of Lakes. It is located on the west side of the city, north of Bde Maka Ska and west of Lake of the Isles. The lake is connected to Lake of the Isles via the Kenilworth Channel.

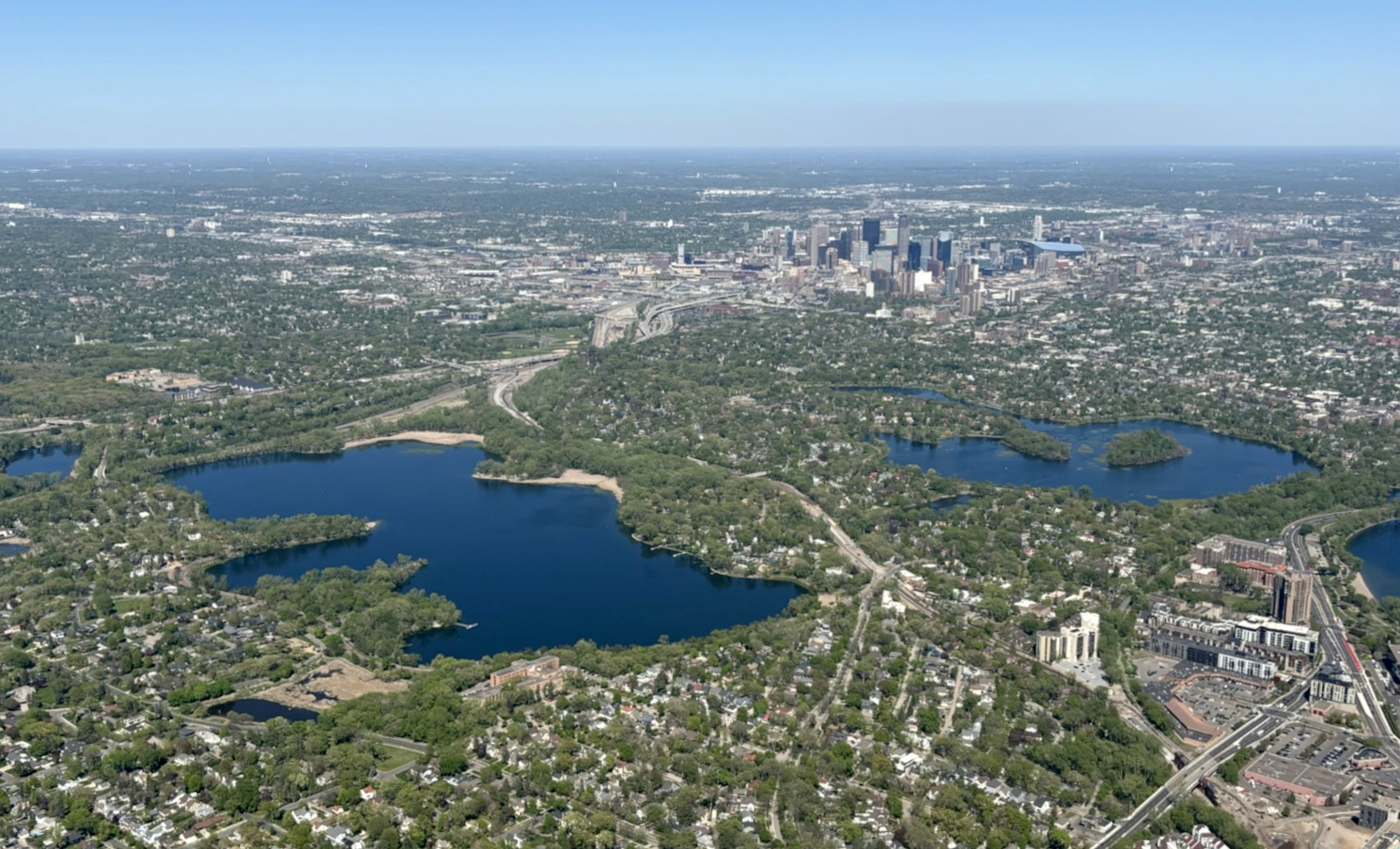
Cedar Lake (left), Lake of the Isles (right), and Minneapolis

The lake is surrounded by parkland, with some easements having been made to private homeowners on the southeast side; it is the only lake in the city with private shoreline. The south and west sides border the Cedar-Isles-Dean neighborhood, while the east shore flanks the Kenwood residential area. On the north is the Cedar Lake Trail and the BNSF Railway, and the south Bryn Mawr neighborhood. Cedar Lake has an area of 164 acres (0.66 km^{2}) and a maximum depth of 51 feet (16 m). The Minneapolis Park and Recreation Board manages the lake and parkland around the lake.

== Paths ==
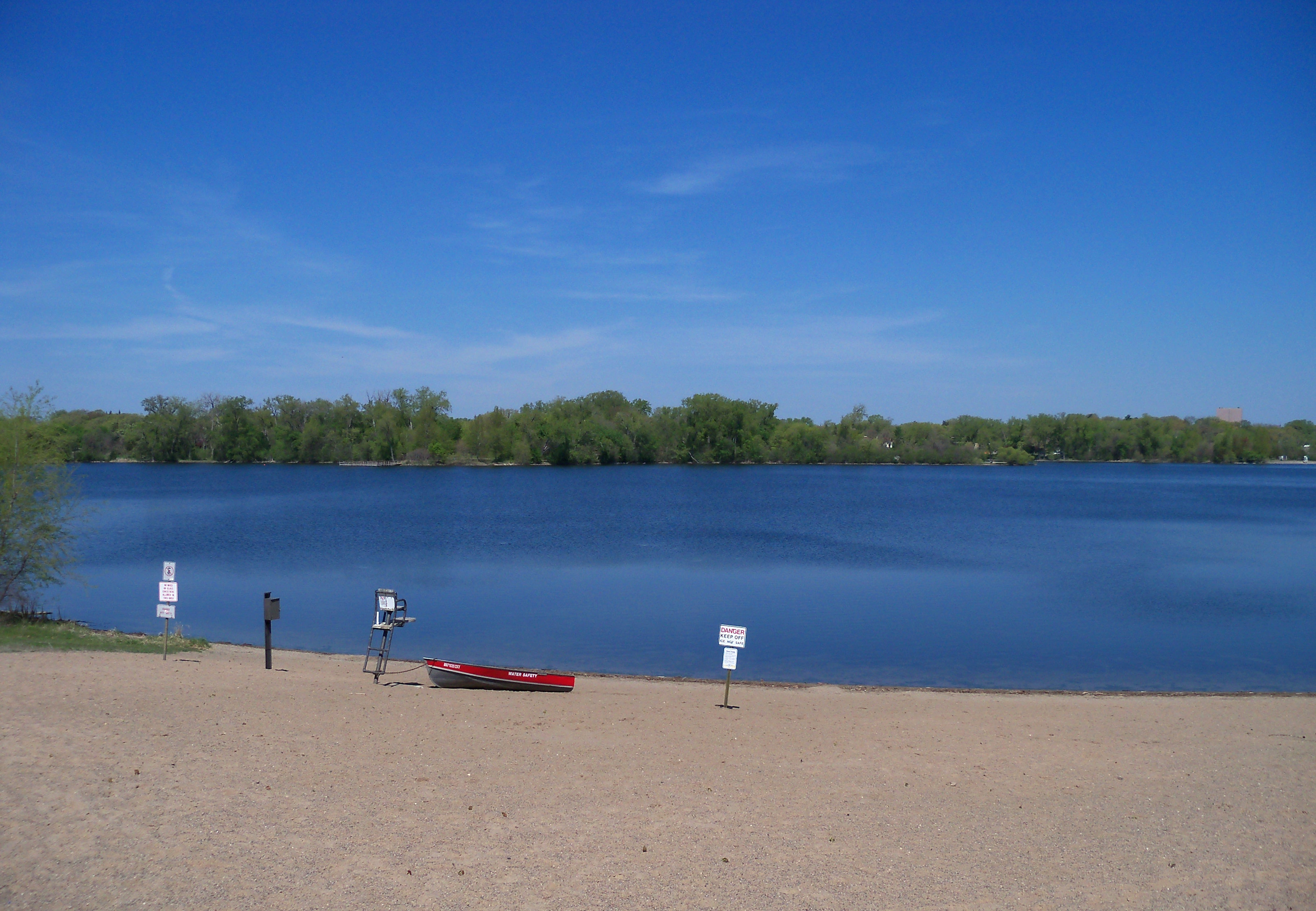
Beach on Cedar Lake in 2012.

Cedar Lake is part of the Grand Rounds Scenic Byway, connecting with Brownie Lake Park on the north end and Bde Maka Ska and Lake of the Isles on the south and east ends, respectively, via the parkway system. The Cedar Lake Trail, on the north shore of the lake, serves as both a recreational trail and a link for non-motorized commuters to reach downtown Minneapolis. The 1.68-mile (2.70 km) shared-use path has three separate lanes, a pedestrian lane and east–west lanes for bicyclists and other wheeled users. Trails around the lake on the west include separate bicycle and pedestrian trails as do paths on the Kenilworth Trail, a short distance off the east side of the lake.

=== Encroachment ===
The MPRB owns the entire shoreline of Cedar Lake and the Kenilworth Channel; however, it can authorize private development on park land through an "encroachment license." Shoreline encroachments are common on Cedar Lake, particularly from Cedar Lake South Beach to the Kenilworth Channel. As a result, informal trails have appeared over time, such as one on the west side of the Kenilworth Channel that terminates at Cedar Lake East Beach. This trail was formally added to the MPRB Plan for Cedar Lake and Lake of the Isles in 2023 for future improvements. Encroachments on the Cedar Lake shoreline have caused controversy; while residents are allowed to travel along the entire lake, some commentators have criticized the MPRB and homeowners for making public land less accessible.

== Beaches ==
There are three official swimming beaches at the lake, Cedar Lake East Beach, Cedar Lake Point Beach, and Cedar Lake South Beach.

== Fish ==
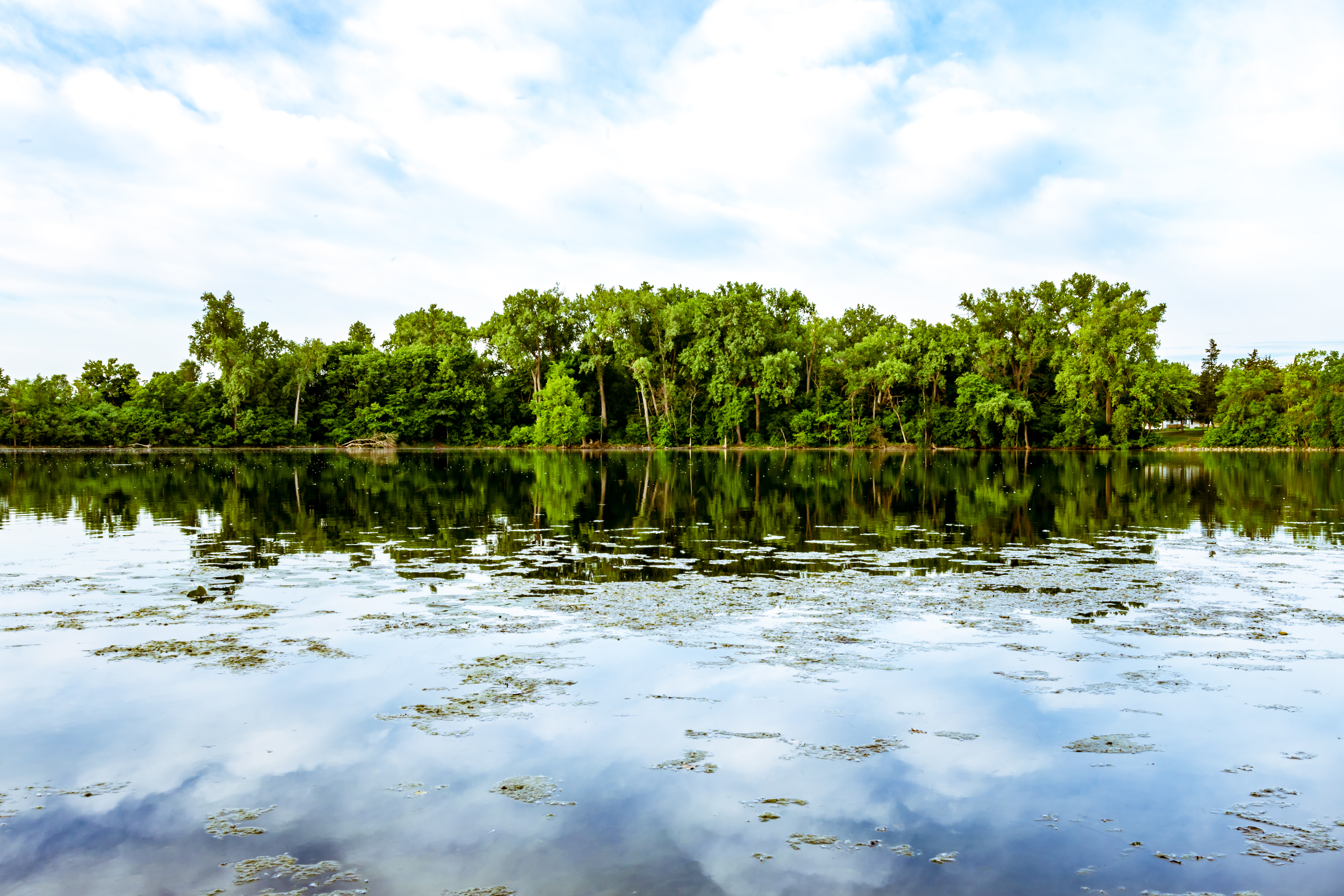
Cedar Lake in the Morning

The lake contains black bullhead, black crappie, bluegill, bowfin, carp, green sunfish, hybrid sunfish, largemouth bass, northern pike, pumpkinseed, tiger muskellunge, walleye, white sucker, and yellow perch. Some fish consumption guideline restrictions have been placed on the lake's bluegill, carp, crappie, largemouth bass, northern pike, and walleye due to mercury and/or PFOS contamination.

== See also ==
- List of lakes in Minneapolis
- List of shared-use paths in Minneapolis
