= Trails in Minneapolis =

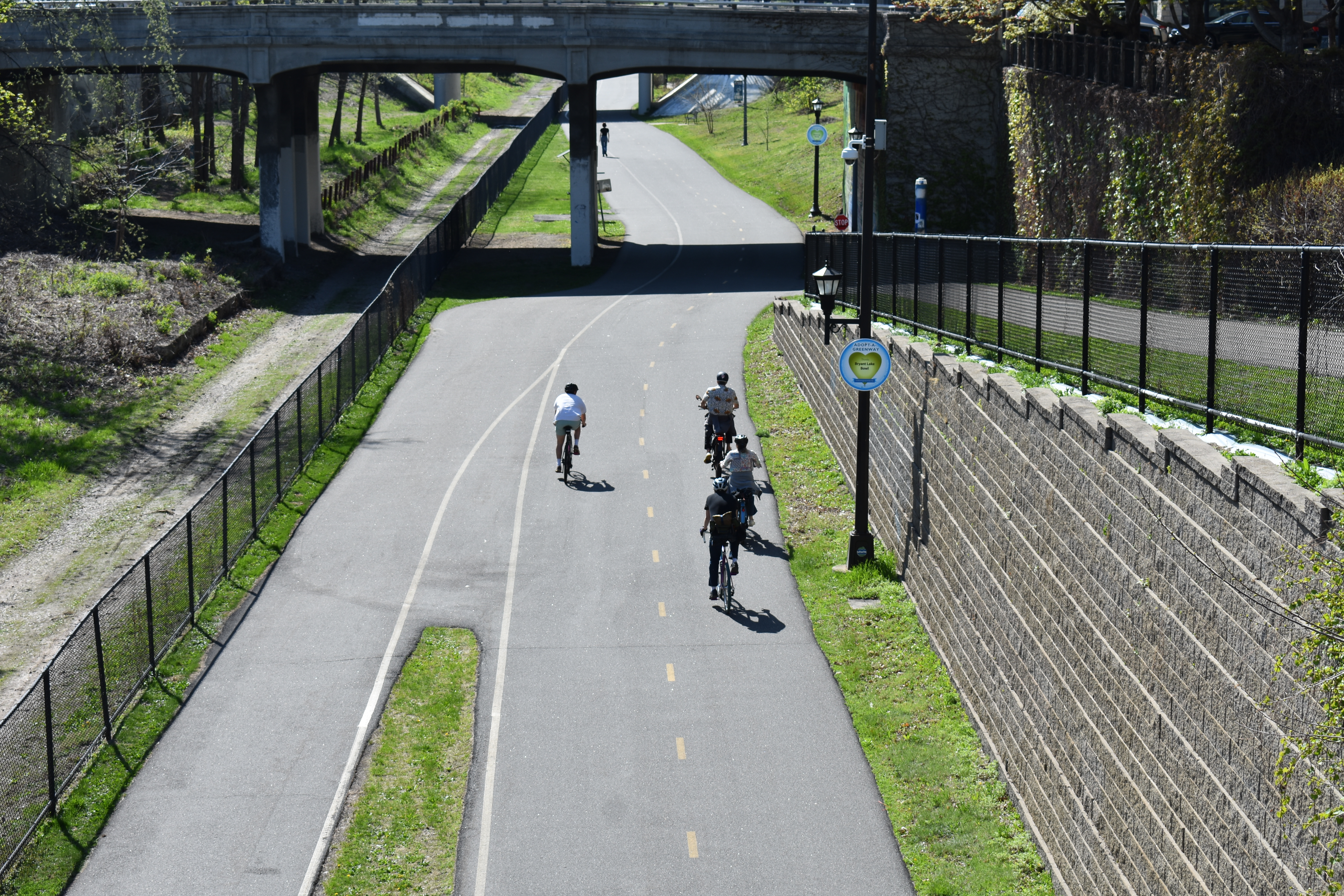
- The Midtown Greenway is one of many shared-use paths in Minneapolis for cyclists and pedestrians
- Type: Shared-use paths; Hiking trails; Cross-country ski trails; Pedestrian areas; Long-distance trails
- Location: Minneapolis, Minnesota, United States

Minneapolis is often considered one of the top biking and walking cities in the United States due to its vast network of trails and dedicated pedestrian areas. In 2020, Walk Score rated Minneapolis as 13th highest among cities over 200,000 people. Some bicycling ratings list Minneapolis at the top of all United States cities, while others list Minneapolis in the top ten. There are over 80 miles (130 km) of paved, protected pathways in Minneapolis for use as transportation and recreation. The city's Grand Rounds National Scenic Byway parkway system accounts for the vast majority of the city's shared-use paths at approximately 50 miles (80 km) of dedicated biking and walking areas. By 2008, other city, county, and park board areas accounted for approximately 30 miles (48 km) of additional trails, for a city-wide total of approximately 80 miles (130 km) of protected pathways. The network of shared biking and walking paths continued to grow into the late 2010s with the additions of the Hiawatha LRT Trail gap remediation, Min Hi Line pilot projects, and Samatar Crossing. The city also features several natural-surface hiking trails, mountain-biking paths, groomed cross-country ski trails in winter, and other pedestrian walkways.

== Shared-use/mixed-use paths ==
Minneapolis includes a number of shared-use or mixed-use paths, which are separate from a roadway, and they support multiple recreation and transportation opportunities, such as bicycling, walking, inline skating, roller skiing, and people in wheelchairs. In the U.S. state of Minnesota, shared-use path standards in are set by Administrative Rules, chapter 8820.9995. The Minnesota Department of Transportation also provides guidance for the design of shared-use paths.

This list includes notable shared-use paths in the city limits of Minneapolis, either whole or in part, and excludes roadway-only bike lanes, hiking-only trails, and mountain bike routes:

=== Grand Rounds National Scenic Byway system ===
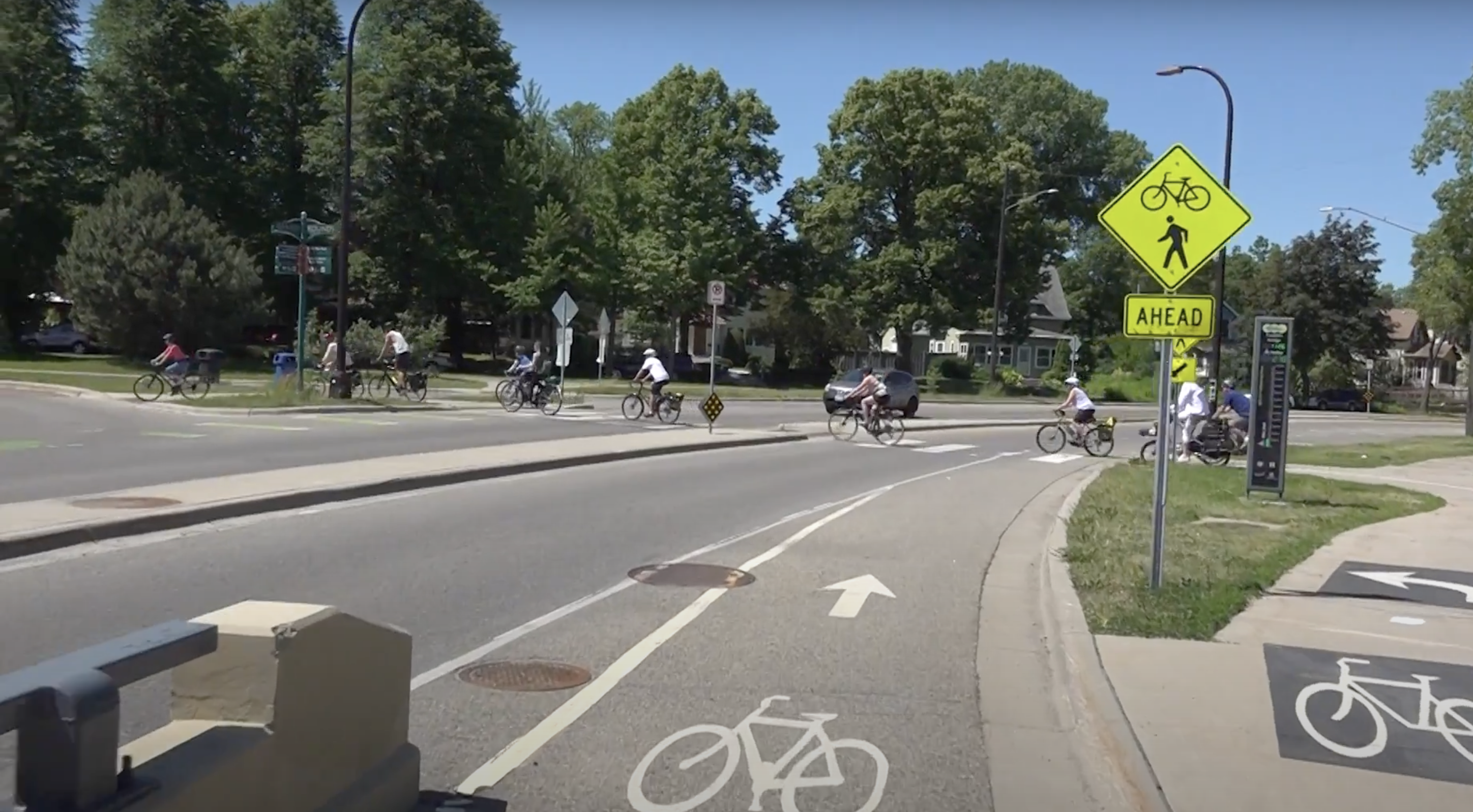
Cyclists crossing Franklin Avenue near West River Parkway

==== Paths along parkways ====
- Memorial and Webber Parkways—3.85 miles (6.20 km)
- Wirth Parkway—3.54 miles (5.70 km)
- Dean Parkway—0.59 miles (0.95 km)
- William Berry Parkway—0.56 miles (0.90 km)
- Minnehaha Creek—4.93 miles (7.93 km)
- Godfrey Parkway—0.5 miles (0.80 km)
- West River and James I. Rice Parkways—7.25 miles (11.67 km)
- East River Parkway—approximately 2.1 miles (3.4 km)
- St. Anthony Parkway—2.8 miles (4.5 km)
- Stinson Parkway—0.95 miles (1.53 km)
- Ridgeway Parkway—0.75 miles (1.21 km)

==== Paths around lakes ====
- Bde Mka Ska—3.1 miles (5.0 km)
- Cedar Lake—1.68 miles (2.70 km)
- Lake Harriet—2.75 miles (4.43 km)
- Lake of the Isles—2.6 miles (4.2 km)
- Lake Nokomis—2.7 miles (4.3 km)
- Powderhorn Lake—1.1 miles (1.8 km)

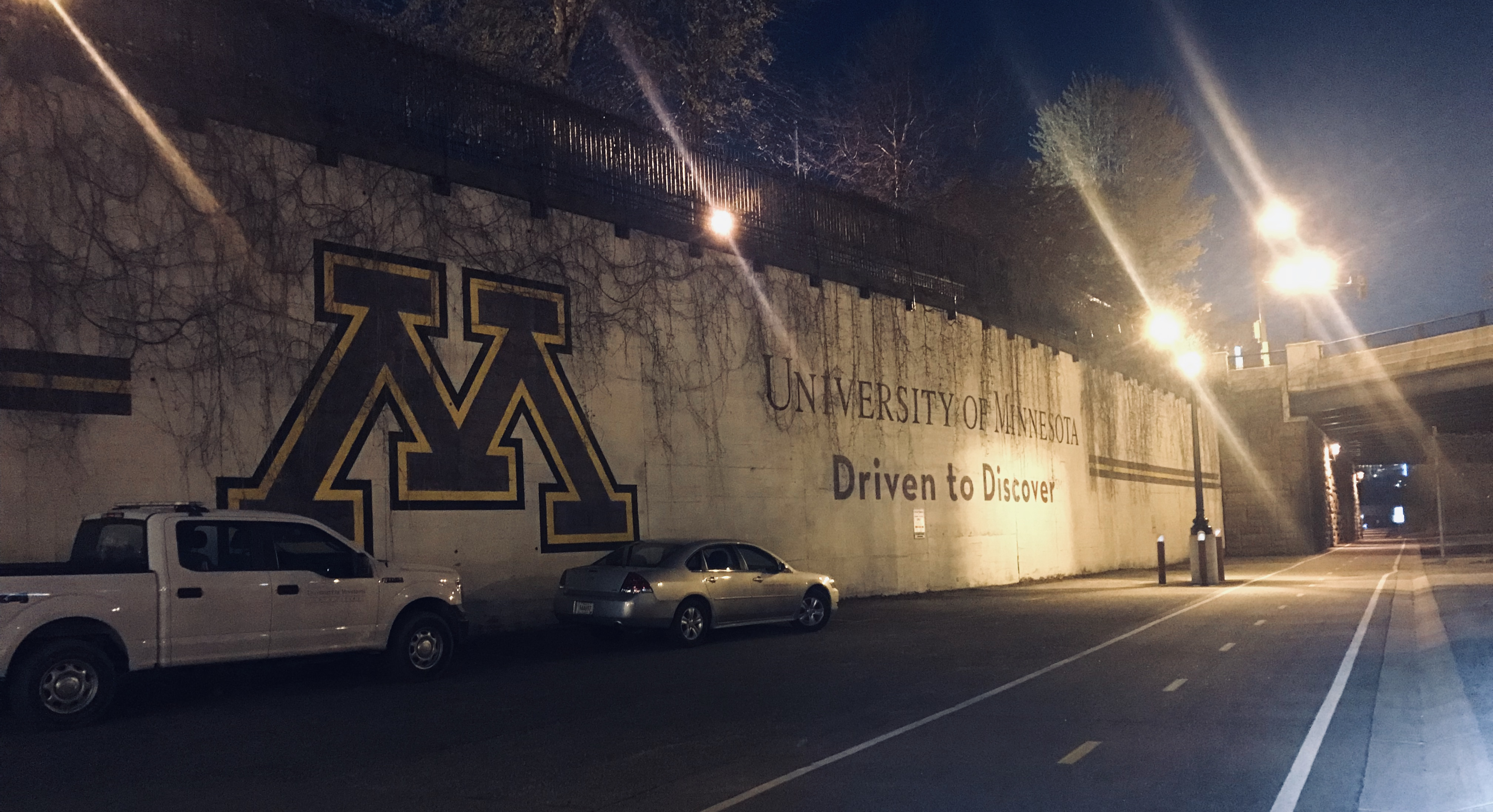
The Dinkytown Greenway is one of the trails that is lit at night.

=== City, county, and park board paths ===
- Cedar Lake Trail—4.3 miles (6.9 km)
- Diagonal Trail—1.3 miles (2.1 km) in Minneapolis from city limits to Broadway Street Northeast
- Dinkytown Greenway—1 mile (1.6 km)
- Hiawatha LRT Trail—4.7 miles (7.6 km)
- Kenilworth Trail—1.5 miles (2.4 km)
- Lake Hiawatha—0.68 miles (1.09 km)
- Little Earth Trail—1 mile (1.6 km)
- Loring Greenway— 1.3 miles (2.1 km)
- Luce Line Trail—1 mile (1.6 km) in Minneapolis from Xerxes Avenue North to North Morgan Avenue
- Nokomis-Minnesota River Regional Trail—5.29 miles (8.51 km)
- The Mall Park—0.32 miles (0.51 km) of a linear park with paved multi-use paths near Lake of the Isles
- Midtown Greenway, including Martin Olav Sabo Bridge over Hiawatha Avenue—5.7 miles (9.2 km)
- Min Hi Line—approximately 3 miles (4.8 km) when complete
- Minnehaha Trail—1.5 miles (2.4 km)
- Samatar Crossing—1,850 feet (560 m)
- Southwest LRT Trail—0.5 miles (0.80 km) from France Avenue to the Midtown Greenway/Kenilworth Trail intersection
- St. Anthony Falls Heritage Trail —1.7 miles (2.7 km)

== Bridges over the Mississippi River with paths ==
List of bridges over the Mississippi River with bicycle and pedestrian paths:

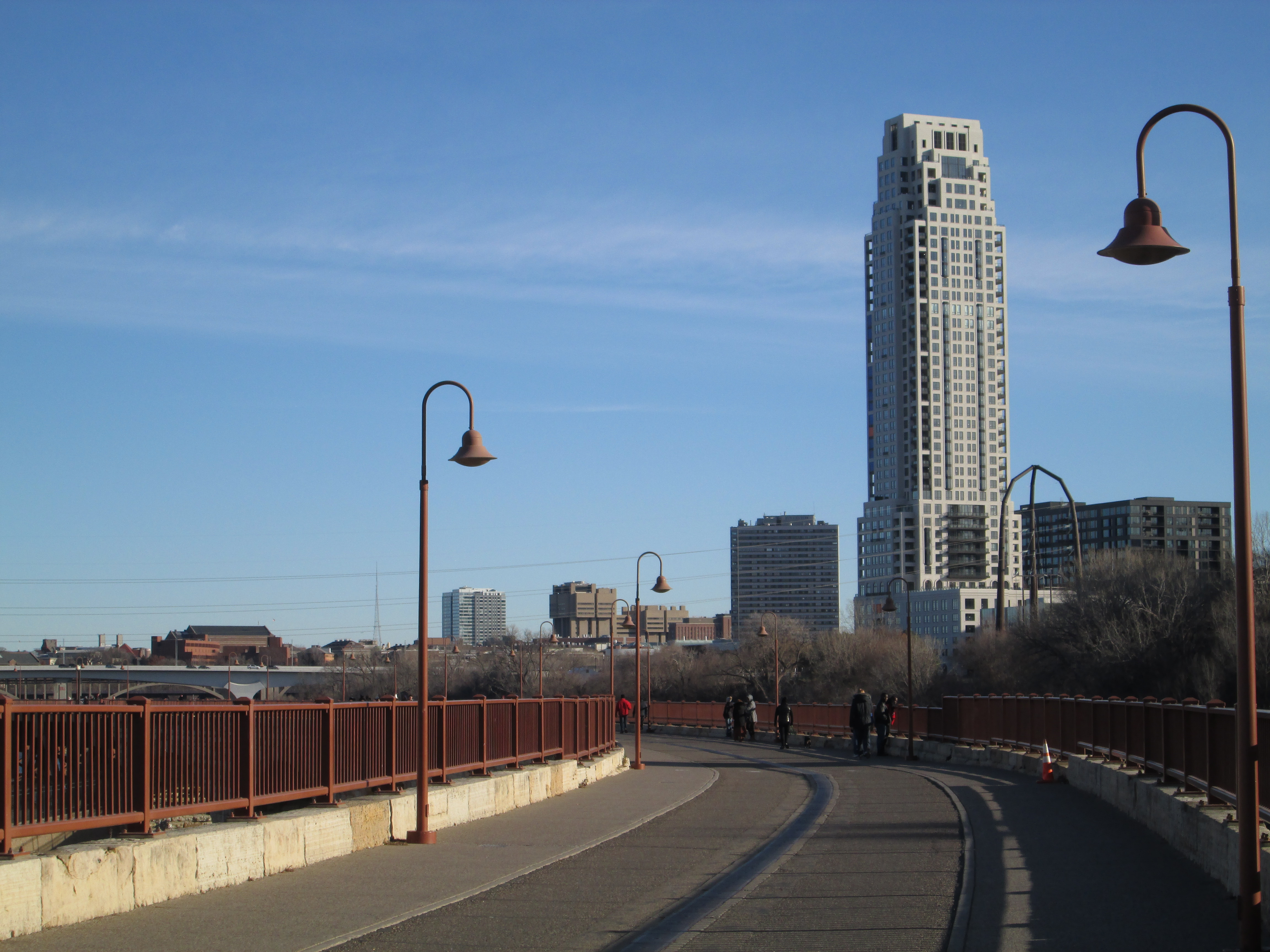
The Stone Arch Bridge is a popular connection over the Mississippi River.

- Ford Parkway Bridge—1,524 feet (465 m)
- Franklin Avenue Bridge—1,055 feet (322 m)
- Lake Street-Marshall Bridge—1,484 feet (452 m)
- Lowry Avenue Bridge—1,576 feet (480 m)
- Northern Pacific Bridge Number 9—952 feet (290 m)
- Plymouth Avenue Bridge—943 feet (287 m)
- Short Line Bridge proposed extension of the Midtown Greenway—1,164 feet (355 m)
- Stone Arch Bridge—2,100 feet (640 m)
- Third Avenue Bridge—2,223 feet (678 m)
- Washington Avenue Bridge—1,130 feet (340 m)

== Hiking trails ==
List of natural-surface hiking trails in Minneapolis:

- Nicollet Island/Boom Island Trails—2.1-mile (3.4 km) loop trail
- Minnehaha Falls Lower Glen Trail—2.1-mile (3.4 km), hiking-only trail in Minnehaha Park along the creek
- Theodore Wirth Park—features a network of mountain biking and hiking trails
- Winchell Trail—5-mile (8.0 km), hiking-only trail along the Mississippi River gorge

== Cross-country ski trails ==
List of cross-country ski trails in Minneapolis, which are groomed in winter when there is sufficient snowfall conditions:

- Chain of Lakes—10.25 miles (16.50 km)
  - Cedar Lake Park—1.9 miles (3.1 km)
  - Cedar Lake and West Cedar Lake—1.9 miles (3.1 km)
  - Kenilworth Channel—1.24 miles (2.00 km)
  - Lake of the Isles—2.2 miles (3.5 km)
  - Bde Maka Ska—3.1 miles (5.0 km)
- Columbia Golf Course—2.2 miles (3.5 km)
- Hiawatha Golf Course—2.55 miles (4.10 km)
- Theodore Wirth Regional Park—14 miles (23 km), a portion of which is snowmaking trails

== Pedestrian pathways and walking areas ==
List of pedestrian pathways and walking areas in Minneapolis:

- Eloise Butler Wildflower Garden/Theodore Wirth Wildflower Trail—2.7-mile (4.3 km) trail and garden walkway
- Lake Harriet/Lyndale Rose Garden and Peace Park—2.8 miles (4.5 km) of paved walkways
- Minneapolis Sculpture Garden—11-acre (4.5 ha) with pedestrian-only paths
- Minneapolis Skyway System—network of enclosed pedestrian footbridges totaling 9.5 miles (15.3 km)
- Milwaukee Avenue Historic District—houses sit along a bike- and pedestrian-friendly mall on which motor traffic is prohibited
- Nicollet Mall—a 12-block pedestrian and transit mall downtown with occasional bike use allowed

List of former pedestrian areas in Minneapolis:

- George Floyd Square—occupied protest of 38th Street and Chicago Avenue in 2020 and 2021 that closed the street to vehicular traffic

== Long-distance trails ==
List of long-distance trails in Minneapolis:

- Mississippi River Trail (MRT)—the 3,000-mile (4,800 km) cycling and pedestrian route from Lake Itasca, Minnesota to Venice, Louisiana, appropriates portions of the Grand Rounds National Scenic Byway trail system and Minnehaha Trail in Minneapolis.

== See also ==
- Cycling in Minnesota
- List of lakes in Minneapolis
- List of streets in Minneapolis
- Nice Ride Minnesota
