= Cedar Lake Trail =

Shared-use path in Minneapolis

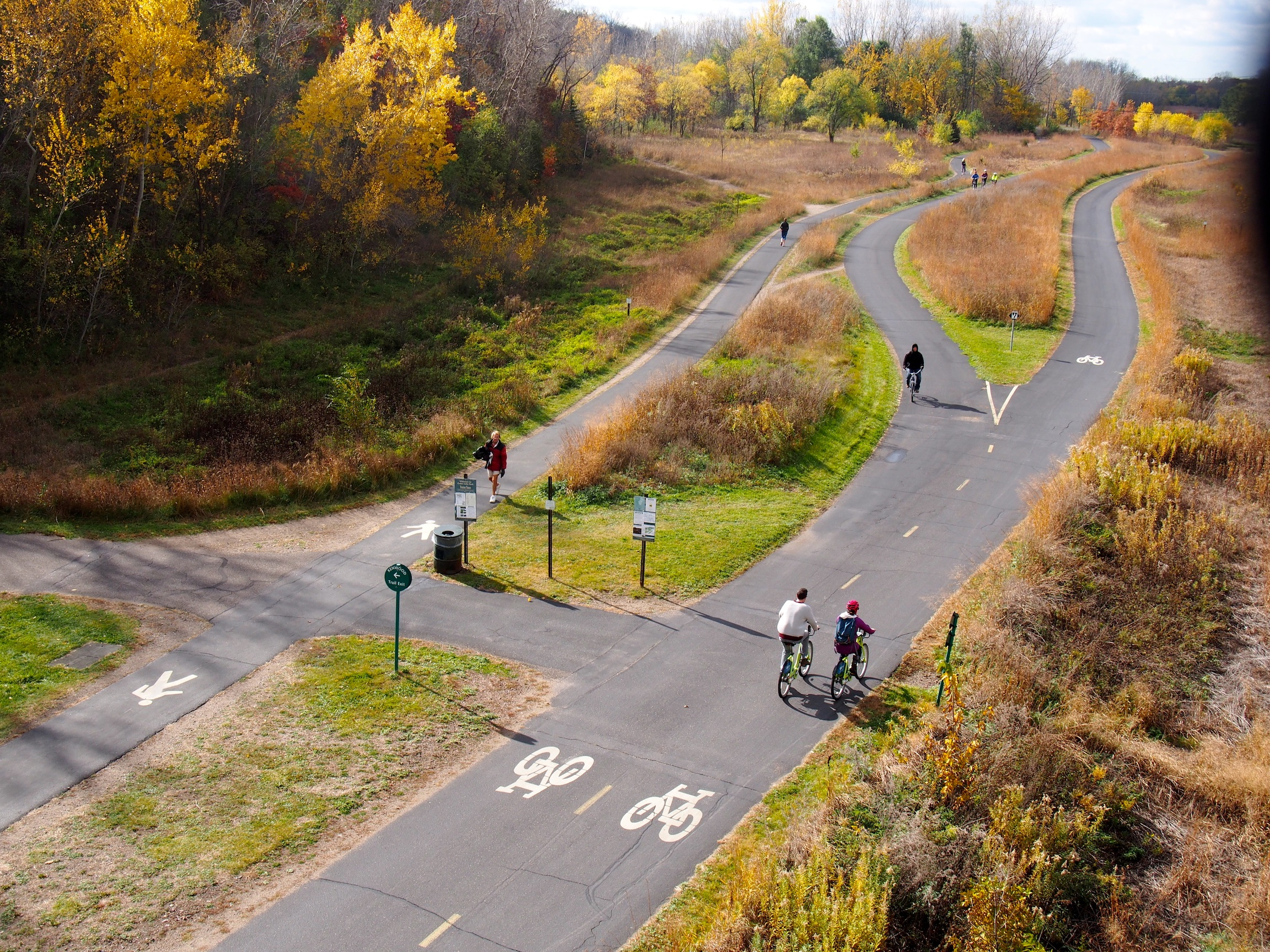
- Cedar Lake Trail

Cedar Lake Trail
- Length: 4.3 mi (6.9 km)
- Location: Minneapolis, Minnesota, United States
- Use: Cycling, Pedestrians
- Grade: Mostly flat
- Difficulty: Easy
- Season: Year-round
- Sights: City skyline views
- Hazards: Detours due to construction
- Surface: Pavement

Cedar Lake Trail is a 4.3-mile (6.9 km), shared-use path in the U.S. state of Minnesota, from downtown Minneapolis to the neighboring suburb of St. Louis Park. The trail begins at its eastern trailhead in downtown Minneapolis (44°59′11″N 93°16′01″W) and continues west to Minnesota State Highway 100 in St. Louis Park (44°57′43″N 93°20′36″W). At the trail's west end, a paved path continues for another 4.2 miles (6.8 km) through St. Louis Park to Hopkins under the former name of Hutchinson Spur Trail ("Hutch Spur"), but known as North Cedar Lake Regional Trail since 2009. In 2019, large portions of the Cedar Lake Trail were closed due to construction of the Metro Green Line Extension with expected reopening in 2021 or 2022.

== Route ==
The trail begins at MN 100 in St. Louis Park, and it will parallel the BNSF Railway It continues east, and passes under a pedestrian bridge serving Cedar Lake Road. It passes under Cedar Lake Parkway, and traverses the northern shore of Cedar Lake. It intersects the Kenilworth Trail and the Metro Green Line Extension light rail on the northeastern shore. It passes under I-394, and will parallel it for the next mile. It goes through an old rail yard, and passes under the Van White Memorial Boulevard bridge. It exits the yard and passes under eight bridges, serving Interstate 94 and ramps and frontage roads. It passes under Glenwood and Royalston Avenues. At this point, the Metro Green Line Extension leaves the corridor, and the trail has a spur leading to Glenwood. It passes under 10th Street and 7th Street. It immediately enters Target Field, and passes under the light rail station above. It also passes the former Northstar Line's station for the stadium. It goes under several downtown streets, including I-94 west viaducts and Washington Avenue. It finally terminates at West River Parkway, after leaving the BNSF railway.

Cedar Lake Trail was the first federally funded bicycle commuter trail in the nation. It is known as the first "bicycle freeway" because it has three lanes for most of its length within Minneapolis: separate one-way lanes for bike traffic (like a divided highway) and third parallel lane for two-way pedestrian traffic. It is also considered a rail trail as the pathway follows a BNSF Railway line (the railroad's Wayzata Subdivision) west out of downtown Minneapolis. The North Cedar Lake Trail continues to follow that line until just west of Louisiana Avenue in St. Louis Park, where it begins turning southwest.

The Cedar Lake Regional Trail connects with other Minneapolis trails:

- A bridge over the BNSF tracks connects to Bryn Mawr Park and a section of the Luce Line Regional Trail along Bassett Creek.
- A short spur leads to Parade Stadium and provides a connection to Kenwood Parkway.
- A longer spur, the Kenilworth Trail, follows the old Chicago and North Western Railway branch along the east side of Cedar Lake, which provides a connection to the Midtown Greenway, Southwest LRT Trail, and the Grand Rounds trail system around Bde Maka Ska.
- Another spur follows the west shore of Cedar Lake, which is also park of the Grand Rounds trail system.

North Cedar Lake Trail also connects with several short trails within St. Louis Park, most significantly a trail along 33rd Street at Aquila Park. At its west end, the North Cedar Lake Trail meets the Southwest LRT Trail at the intersection of U.S. Highway 169 and Excelsior Boulevard, near the Hopkins Depot in Hopkins. The Cedar Lake Regional Trail, North Cedar Lake Trail, Cedar Lake LRT Trail, Midtown Greenway (for about a block) and the Kenilworth Trail together form a 12.5 mile loop.

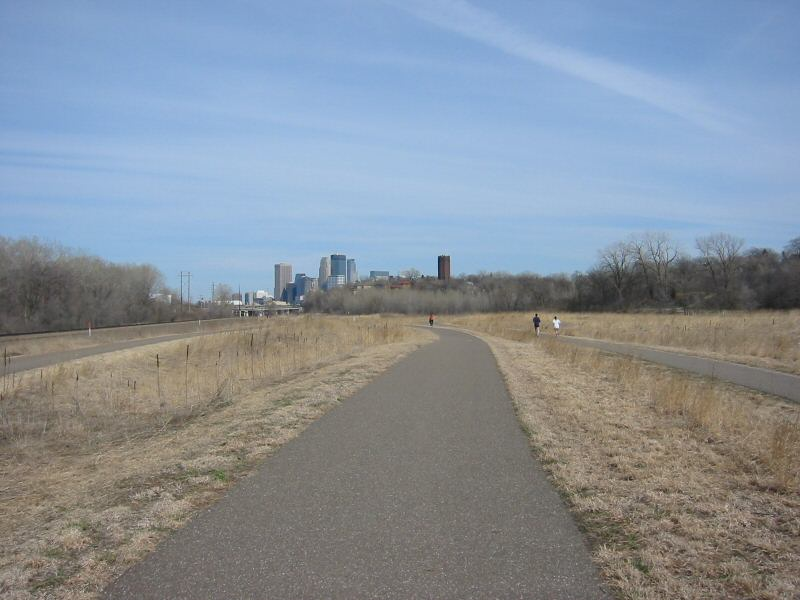
A look at the Cedar Lake Trail heading into downtown Minneapolis, from early spring of 2006.

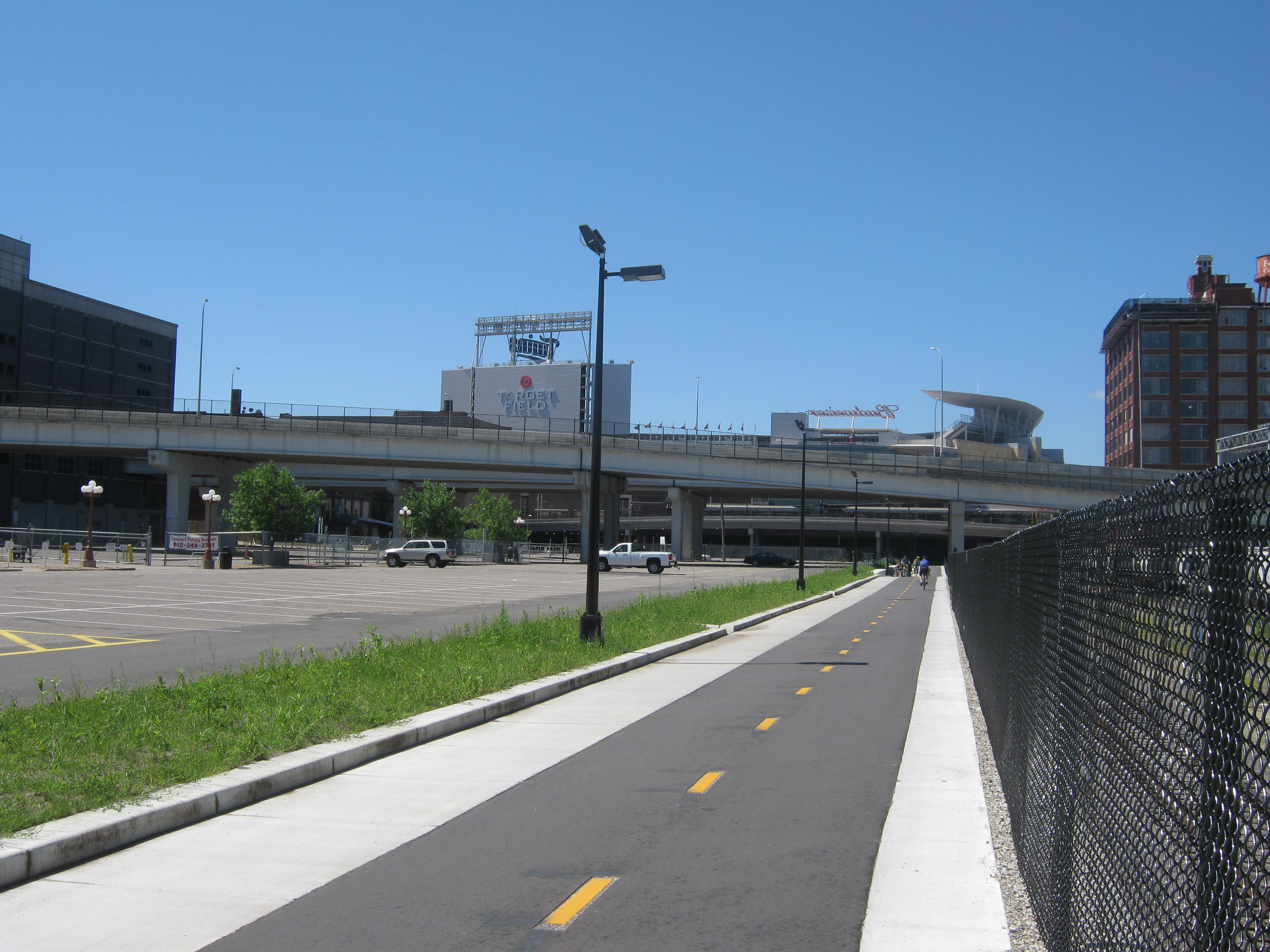
An extension of the Cedar Lake Trail connecting to Target Field and the Mississippi

== History ==
=== Railroad conversion ===
The trail is located in areas that were formerly railroad yards for the Great Northern Railway and the Minneapolis and St. Louis Railway. When Burlington Northern Railroad (the successor to Great Northern) consolidated its facilities elsewhere, and the Chicago and North Western (the successor to Minneapolis and St. Louis) dismantled the rail facilities, the land became available for use as parkland. It was at that time, starting in 1989, that the Cedar Lake Park Association rallied thousands of citizens and spearheaded (raising over $500,000) the campaign to purchase the land from the railroad and create Cedar Lake Park. Then in 1995, the association, along with the Minneapolis Park and Recreation Board and Minneapolis Public Works, lead the effort to create the Cedar Lake Regional Trail. An additional $500,000 in funding for the trail came from association members, the rest came from federal and state agencies, totaling $1.6 million. This amount funded the first two segments of the trail, from Highway 100 in the west, to Royalston Avenue near downtown Minneapolis, which were constructed in 1995.

=== Trail extensions in the 2010s ===
Phase III of the Cedar Lake Regional Trail, which extends the east end of the trail about 1 mile (1.6 km) under Target Field and past the Target Field train station to reach West River Parkway along the Mississippi River, began construction in the summer of 2010. It was expected to be completed in November 2010. Unfortunately the cold weather in October and November delayed completion of the trail to the river. This final trail segment officially opened with a ribbon-cutting ceremony on June 14, 2011.

The planned Metro Green Line Extension light rail line will parallel the Cedar Lake Trail from near Royalston Avenue southwest to just past Interstate 394, a distance of about 1.5 miles (2.4 km). At that point, the light rail line will diverge to the southwest parallel to the Kenilworth Trail. The line is currently expected to open in 2027. The Cedar Lake Park Association (CLPA), a grass-roots citizens group that spearheaded the campaign to buy the land and built the trail in the 1990s, noted in their Fall 2010 Update that an at-grade crossing of Cedar Lake Regional Trail and the Metro Green Line Extension would pose several problems, including severe traffic flow restrictions for bicycles and pedestrians, as well as safety concerns. CLPA is advocating a grade-separated crossing.

The third and final segment of the trail, shadowing the Burlington Northern Santa Fe (BNSF) mainline through the heart of a dense urban infrastructure, cost $9.2 million, according to Minneapolis Public Works Project Manager Jack Yuzna. The final segment took over 11 years to plan and construct as alignments changed and entities such as the Minnesota Ballpark Authority sought to locate the new Twins stadium in the warehouse district. Eventually Target Field was built cantilevered out over the space for the trail and the BNSF moved its tracks to accommodate both the trail and the Ballpark Authority. During all of this time, indeed, since the first envisioning of a trail from Hwy 100 to the Mississippi River by Theodore Wirth III in his Cedar Lake Park & Trail Feasibility Study (1989), the Cedar Lake Park Association, a volunteer citizens-activist organization, has led the way. As Mayor R. T. Rybak noted in his speech at the ribbon-cutting ceremony, "Citizens groups like the Cedar Lake Park Association hold [public official's] feet to the fire to make sure projects like this get done."

== See also ==
- Bicycle commuting
- Cedar Lake East Beach
- List of shared-use paths in Minneapolis
