= Cedar Lake East Beach =

Natural beach in Minneapolis

Coordinates: 44°57′40″N 93°19′6″W

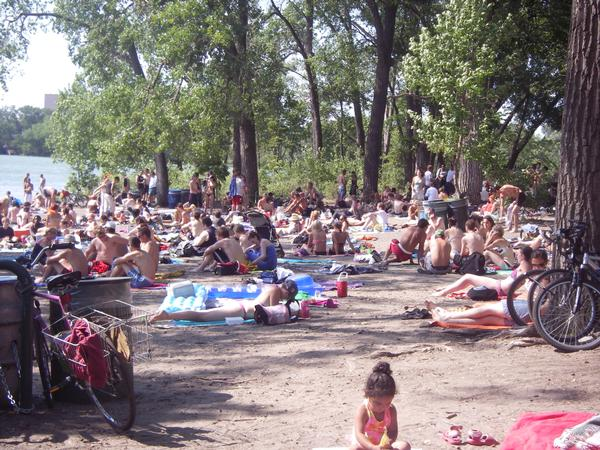
- Many people at Cedar Lake Beach, then known as Hidden Beach, in July 2007.
- Interactive map of Cedar Lake East Beach
- Type: Swimming beach
- Location: Minneapolis, Minnesota, United States
- Operator: Minneapolis Park and Recreation Board
- Open: Daily, 6:00 a.m. to 10:00 p.m.
- Designation: Life guards on duty seasonally
- Website: Cedar Lake East Beach

Cedar Lake East Beach, popularly known as Hidden Beach, is an urban beach in Minneapolis, Minnesota, United States. It is managed by the Minneapolis Park and Recreation Board and located on the east side of Cedar Lake. Owing to its relatively secluded location, the beach became known as an enclave of counter-culture in the 1960s and 1970s. Community pressure resulted in the beach undergoing a contentious series of renovations in the 2000s.

== History ==
=== Railway: 1860s to 1980s ===
Before 1867, Cedar Lake was significantly larger than its current size, and most of the present-day woods surrounding Cedar Lake East Beach, particularly to the south east, were areas of water and wetland. In 1867, the St. Paul and Pacific Railway (a precursor to the BNSF Railway) built an earthen causeway through what was then a large bay on the east side of Cedar Lake. In 1871, the Minneapolis and St. Louis Railroad joined the St. Paul and Pacific Railway, running parallel tracks along the causeway. Slowly, by dumping cinders and other material, the part of the bay east of the causeway was filled in. The Minneapolis and St. Louis Railroad (became the St. Paul, Minneapolis, and Manitoba and moved its tracks from the east side to the north side of the lake 1883) then used the new land to create a major train yard. In 1878, a large scale ice cutting operation known as Cedar Lake Ice Company was founded on the lake's north eastern shore, which shipped ice to places as far away as St. Louis, Missouri. By 1900, Dingley's boat house occupied the end of a thin peninsula on the eastern side of the lake, which eventually widened and became the site of Cedar Lake East Beach.

In 1913, as part of the effort to create the Chain of Lakes as well as the Grand Rounds Scenic Byway, Cedar Lake was lowered by 5 feet (1.5 m) to connect it with Lake of the Isles. As a result, what remained of the East Bay (west of the old earthen rail corridor) dried up. Despite the large railway operations going on nearby, the land surrounding Cedar Lake's eastern shore was sold to build houses, hotels, and other structures between 1895 and 1975. Unlike today, houses occupied both sides of Upton Avenue South. In the 1950s, the area was used as a city dump. Much of the road construction debris from the interstate highway projects wound up as mounds of rubbish along the eastern shoreline of Cedar Lake. The area quickly overgrew with cottonwood trees, resulting in the forested hills to the southeast of the beach.

=== Counter-culture: 1960s to mid-late 2000s ===
Before the 1960s, the beach was a small grassy clearing by the shore, led to by a deer path-sized trail. It became known locally as an unofficial nude beach. Most of the railway yard closed by the mid-1980s, and the tracks and buildings were removed. In 1988, residents in the surrounding neighborhood purchased the land to the west of Upton Avenue South, between the lake and the road, and turned it into a city park with a vision of establishing a nature park. Instead, the site became a center of countercultural activity which drew attention from the local arts scene. The beach was nicknamed "Hidden Beach" due to its relative seclusion, being only accessible by a wooded path. Many of the beach's denizens spent the entire day at the beach, which became a venue for music, picnicking, partying, and relaxation. These activities gradually attracted the attention of park police, leading to frequent confrontations and raids. Beachgoers blamed the confrontations on the inhabitants of the affluent surrounding neighborhood, who were said to dislike the beach's countercultural habitués.

=== Park conversion: post 2010 ===
In 1995, residents in the neighborhood surrounding the beach used money from the Neighborhood Revitalization Plan funds to hire off-duty police officers to patrol the beach more frequently. This was done through the Kenwood Isles Area Association. The reasons behind this stemmed from a concern over illegal activity at the beach; residents cited nudity, cannabis use, and parties as the reason for increased enforcement. Beachgoers claimed that residents aimed to push out non-resident use of the beach entirely, and that the construction of a new entrance to the beach was intended to give easier access for police. In 2004, a park renovation was announced, under the aegis of as invasive Buckthorn removal operation. That summer, the park board widened paths and clear cut areas leading to the beach by clearing out buckthorn; as well as all non-invasive trees and plants. The park board removed additional vegetation in subsequent years and continues to do so. Crime, such as car break-ins and robberies, continued to occur in the area after the renovation, which residents attributed to beachgoers, who in turn blamed it on outside criminals who reached the area by bus.

In 2007, community members held a session of meetings to address the growing concern over activity at the beach. Neighbors voted down a proposal to build a large parking lot. However, they voted in favor of graveling the path to the beach, which required clear cutting of additional trees and endangered plant life, to allow for service and police vehicles to reach the beach area. Other renovations approved included installation of picnic tables, a grill, a permanent police-only parking lot on the beachside, and a lifeguard stand. The initial wood life guard stand burned down, which some suspect was deliberate by vandals, and was replaced with a metal stand.

== In popular culture ==
The cover for the 1985 album New Day Rising by Hüsker Dü was shot at Hidden Beach.

== Photo gallery ==
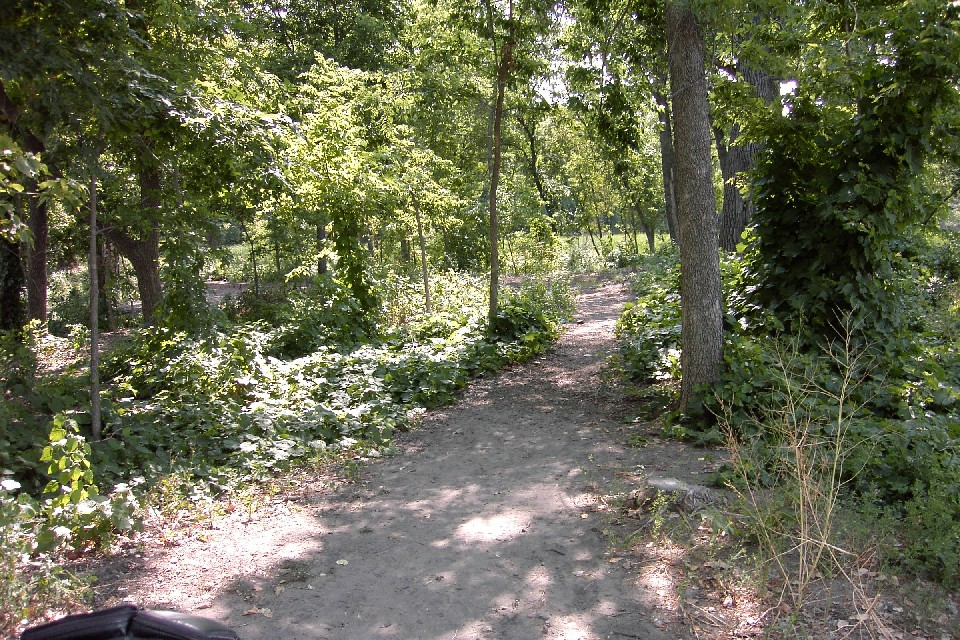
South eastern portion of Cedar Lake East Beach in August 2005.

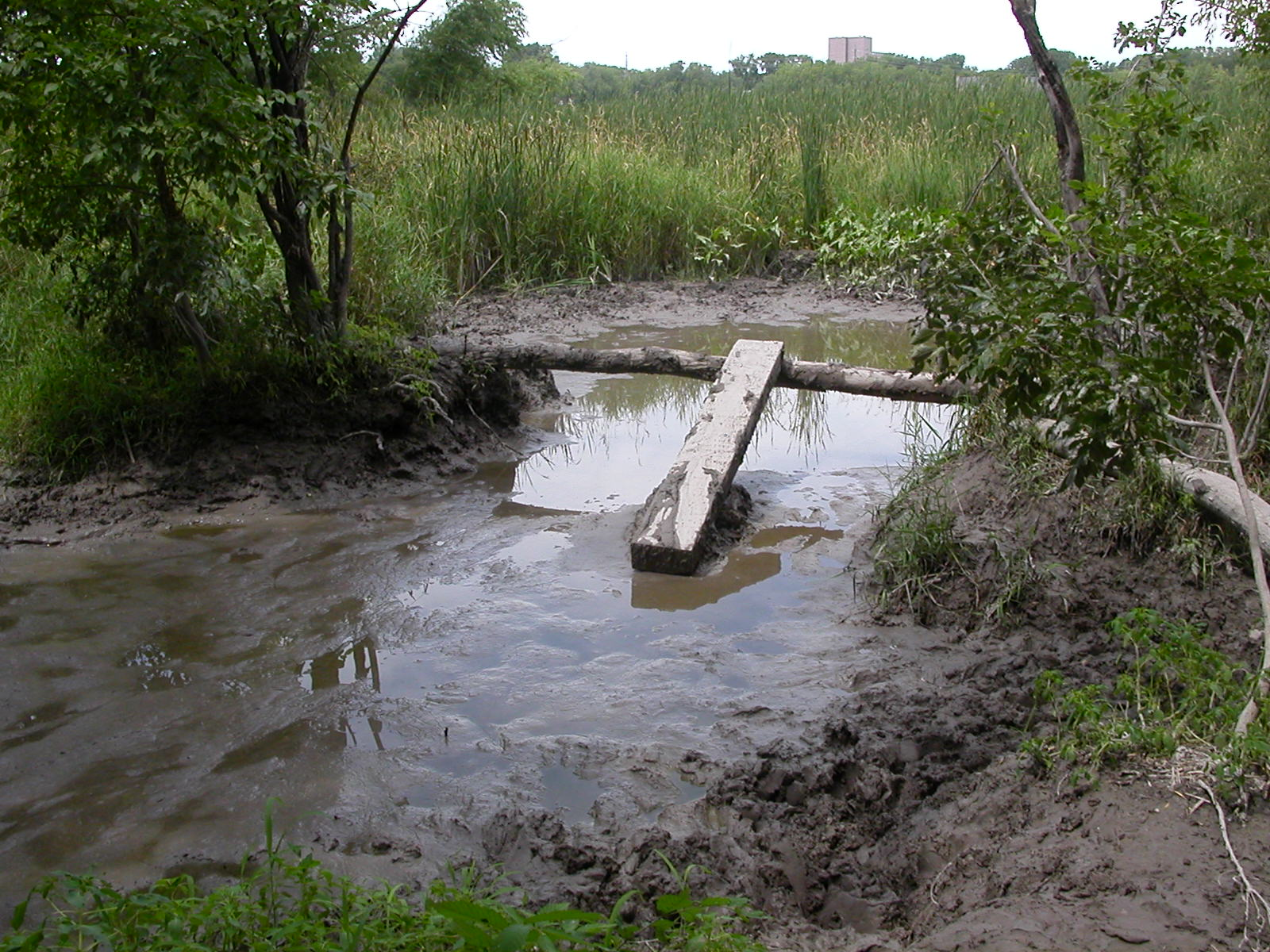
Mud pit area in 2006.

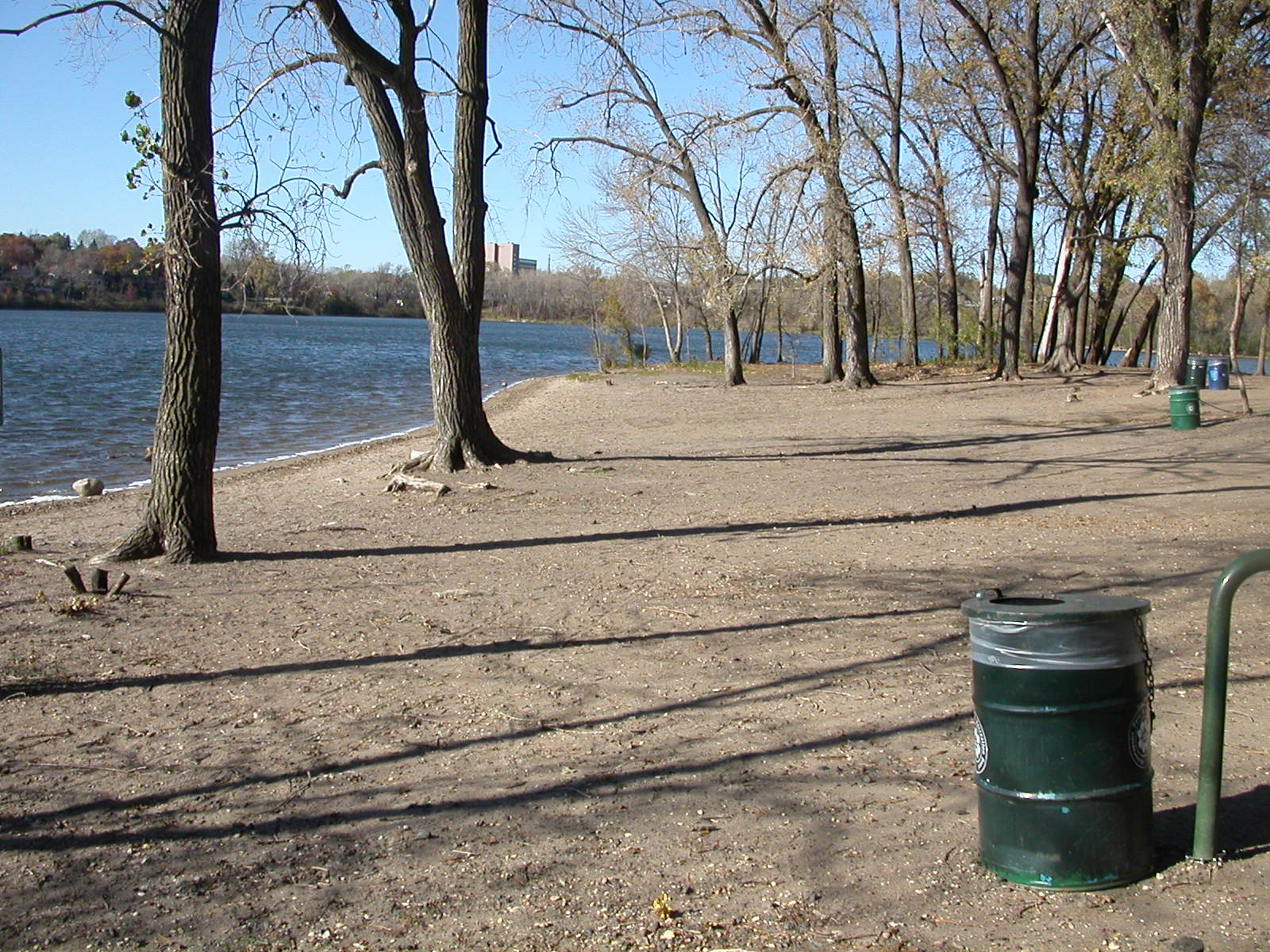
View of Cedar Lake East Beach in the late fall of 2006.

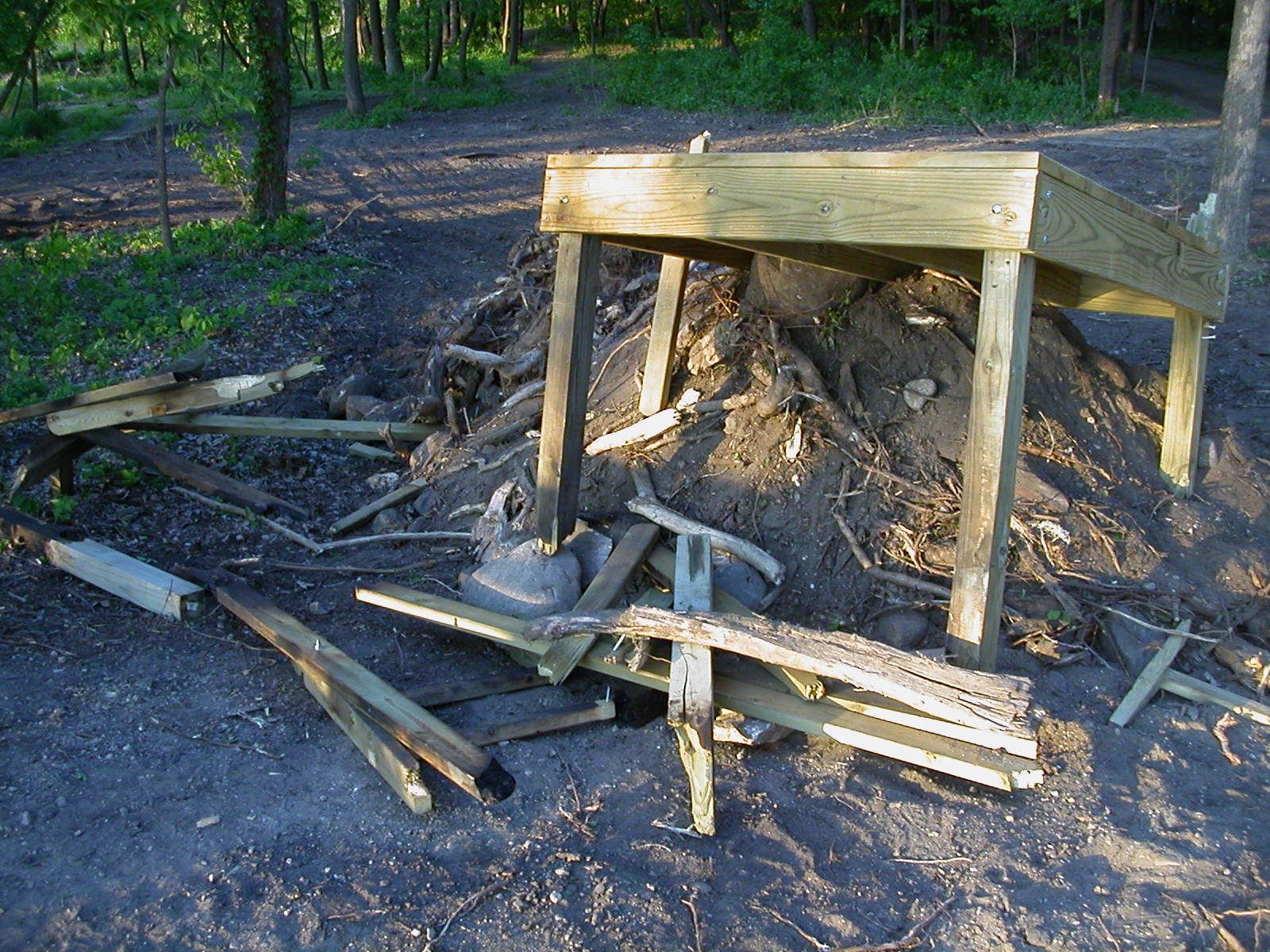
A destroyed life guard tower at Cedar Lake East Beach in 2007.

== See also ==
- Cedar Lake Trail
