= Southwest LRT Trail =

Shared-use path in Minneapolis

Coordinates: 44°55′29″N 93°23′51″W

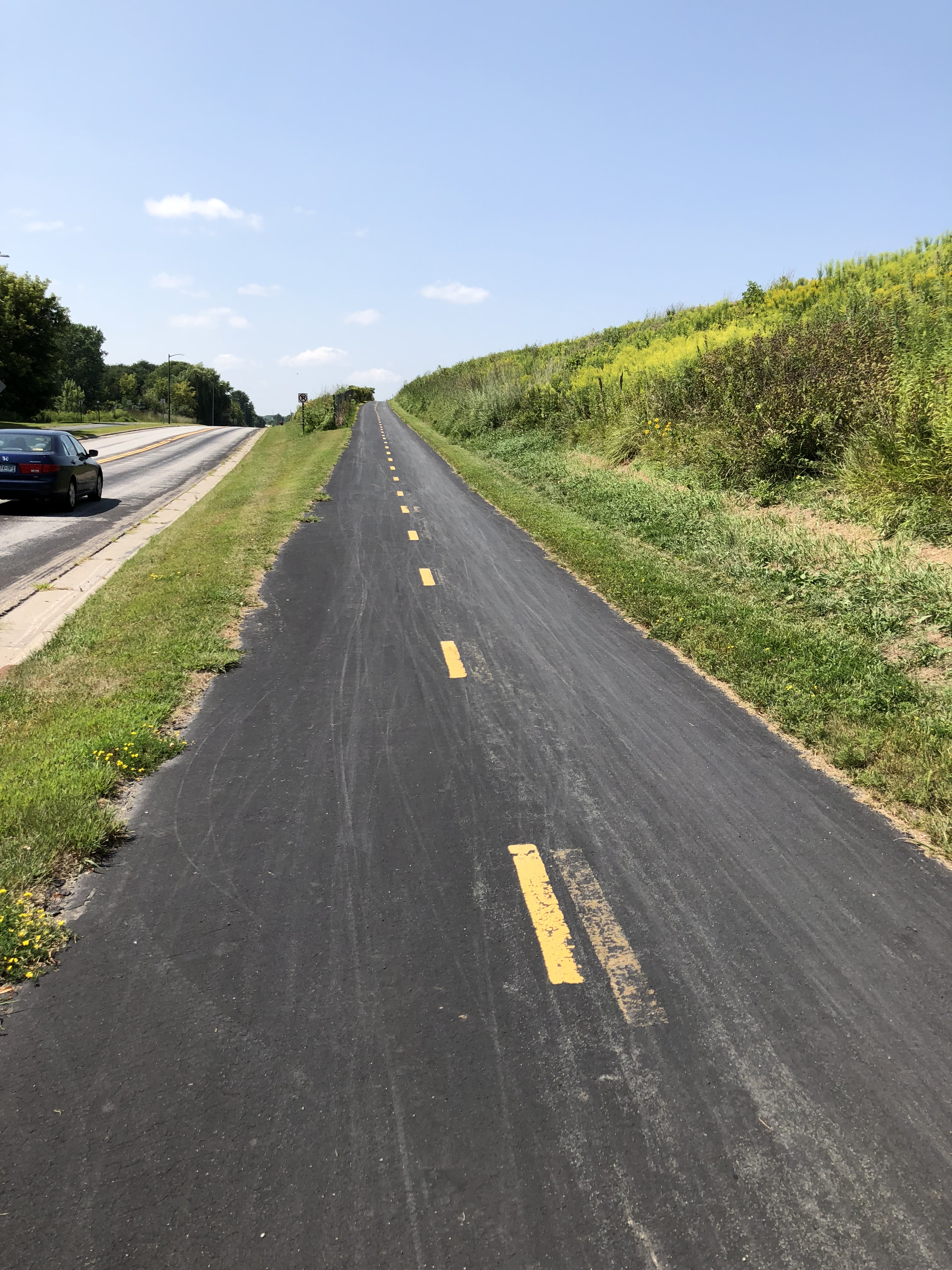
- Minnesota River Bluffs LRT Regional Trail in Eden Prairie
- Location: Minnesota, United States
- Use: Cycling, pedestrians
- Difficulty: Easy
- Surface: Paved; crushed limestone

Southwest LRT Trail is a system of shared-use paths for bicycles and pedestrian paths that extends through several western suburbs of Minneapolis, Minnesota. They are operated by the Three Rivers Park District. Two former rail corridors originally built by the Minneapolis and St. Louis Railway were acquired and converted to trails in anticipation of the Metro Green Line Extension light rail project. The two former railway corridors are now divided into three distinct trails.

== Trail segments ==
=== Cedar Lake LRT Regional Trail ===
The Cedar Lake LRT Regional Trail is the main paved path running from the west end of the Midtown Greenway in Minneapolis through St. Louis Park to Hopkins, Minnesota. It has a length of 5.38 miles (8.66 km), and is paved with asphalt. This trail is named very similarly to the Cedar Lake Trail in Minneapolis and the North Cedar Lake Regional Trail continuation of that trail (formerly known as the Hutchinson Spur Trail) which also extends through St. Louis Park to Hopkins in a roughly parallel route farther north. The North Cedar Lake Regional Trail meets the Cedar Lake LRT Regional Trail just east of the intersection of US 169 and Excelsior Boulevard in Hopkins. The trail runs along the right-of-way of the former Minneapolis and St. Louis Railway's main line to Iowa and Illinois. The rail line was built in 1870, and was eventually acquired by the Chicago and North Western Railway, who abandoned the line in 1990.

=== Minnesota River Bluffs LRT Regional Trail ===
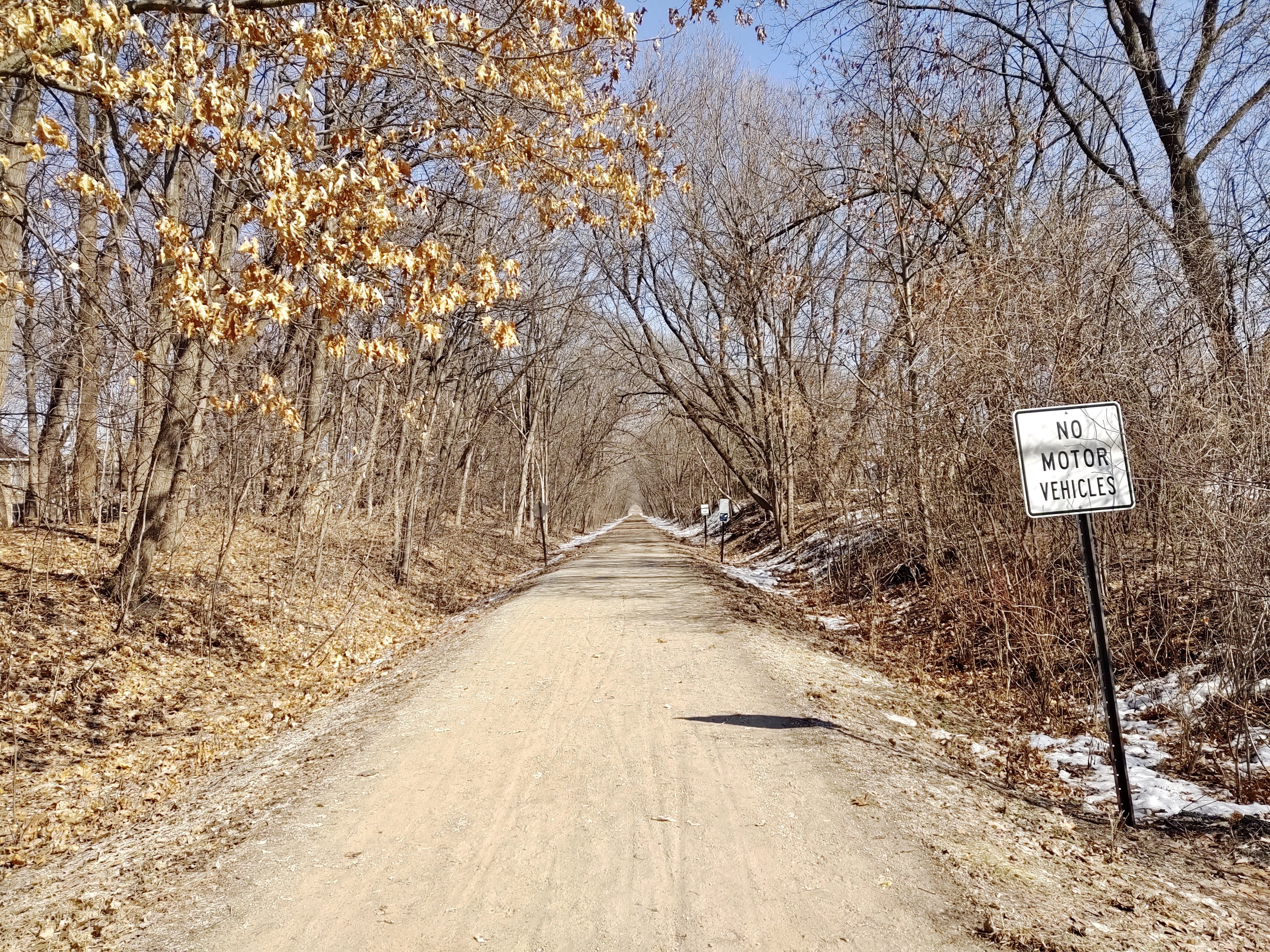
The trail in Eden Prairie, at a local road crossing

The Minnesota River Bluffs LRT Regional Trail is a trail that extends 12.26 miles (19.73 km) along the former Minneapolis and St. Louis right-of-way that brought the trail to Hopkins. It has a crushed limestone surface. It runs from the Hopkins Depot through Hopkins, Minnetonka, Eden Prairie, and Chanhassen. Together, the Cedar Lake LRT Trail and the Minnesota River Bluffs LRT Trail are about 15.5 miles (24.9 km) long. This trail has a partial closure south from Pioneer Trail in Chanhassen since 2014 due to significant mudslides and unsafe conditions and a detour is posted. Reconstruction of the damaged trail section was scheduled for summer 2020. The trail has about 250,000 people in attendance annually. The trail features bluffs of the Minnesota River and the lakes and forests of the area. The pedestrian bridge on the trail that spans Valley View Road replaced a 19-foot (5.8 m) railway bridge. Dubbed the Graffiti Bridge, it was featured in a 1990 Prince film. The bridge was a bottleneck in the growing city of Eden Prairie and was demolished in 1991.

The route of the Metro Green Line Extension is being built to follow the entire Cedar Lake LRT Regional Trail and a portion of the Minnesota River Bluffs LRT Regional Trail before turning southward near Shady Oak Road in Minnetonka.

=== Lake Minnetonka LRT Regional Trail ===
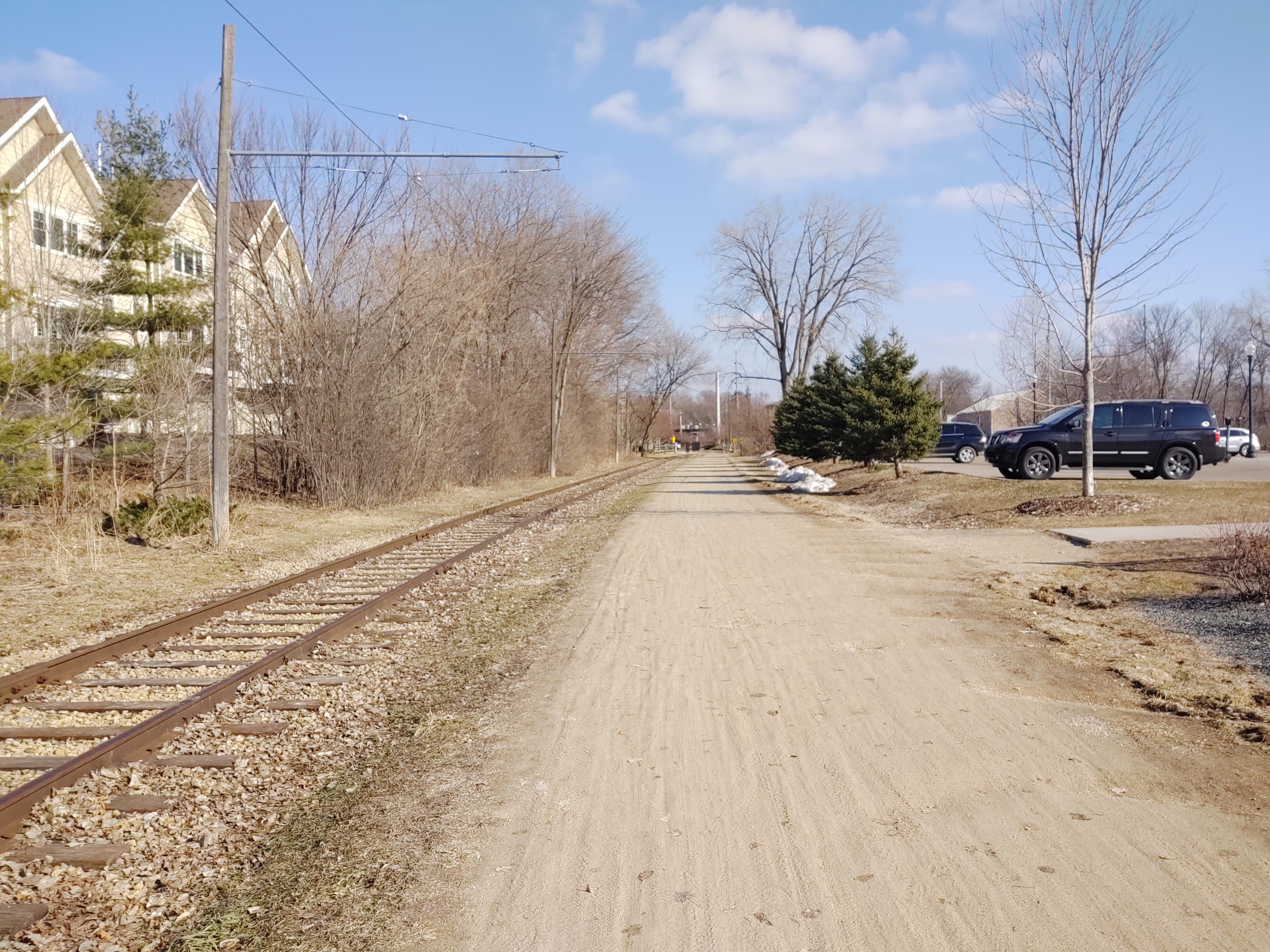
The trail in Excelsior, looking east

The Lake Minnetonka LRT Regional Trail runs for 15.92 miles (25.62 km) from 8th Avenue in Hopkins through Minnetonka, Excelsior, and Chanhassen to 81st Street in Victoria. The trail uses a crushed limestone surface.

It connects to the Minnesota River Bluffs LRT trail via "The Artery" along 8th Avenue South in Hopkins, which opened in 2018. The trail is on the right-of-way for a rail line originally built by the Minneapolis and St. Louis in the 1890s and abandoned by the Chicago and North Western in 1980, one which branched off the old M.&St.L. main at Hopkins and went out to South Dakota. There are about 471,000 people on the trail each year. The trail has access to Lake Minnetonka, Hopkins, Excelsior, and the historic locations the Old Log Theatre and the Cottagewood General Store.

== See also ==
- Bicycle commuting
- List of shared-use paths in Minneapolis
- Rail trail
