= Kenilworth Trail =

Shared-use path in Minneapolis

Coordinates: 44°57′29″N 93°18′54″W

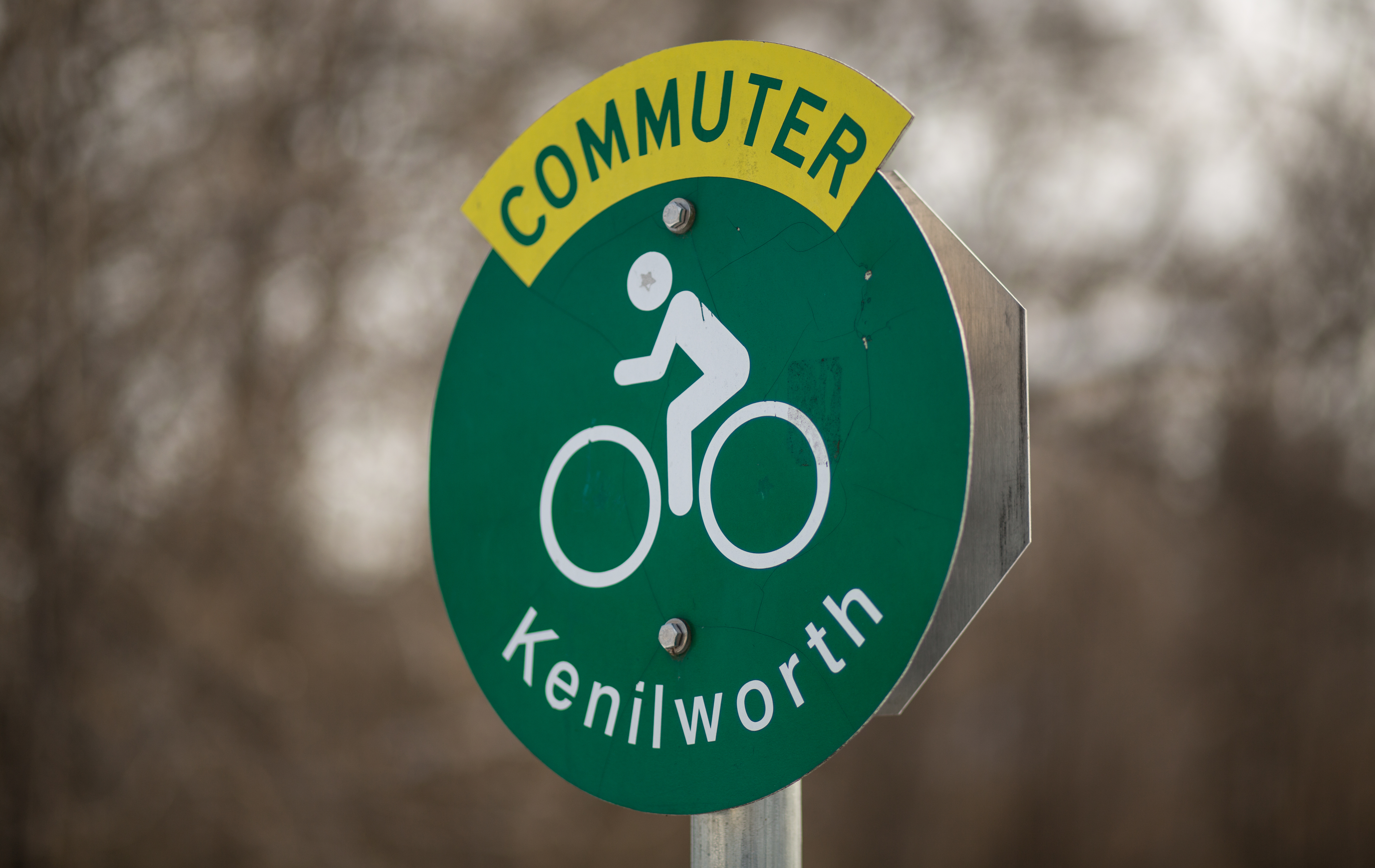
- A sign designating Kenilworth Trail as a bicycle commuter route in Minneapolis.
- Length: 1.5 miles (2.4 km)
- Location: Minneapolis, Minnesota, United States
- Trailheads: Cedar Lake Trail (north); Midtown Greenway (south)
- Use: Cycling, pedestrians
- Difficulty: Easy

The Kenilworth Trail is a paved bicycle trail in Minneapolis, Minnesota, United States. It runs nearly 1.5 miles (2.4 km) and acts as a connector between the Cedar Lake Trail in the north and the Midtown Greenway in the south. Like the Cedar Lake Trail, most of the route is composed of a triple-divided cycleway/pedway with a pair of one-way paths for bicycles and another path for pedestrians. On some maps, a southern segment of the Kenilworth Trail is called the Burnham Trail. The trail corridor has been considered the most highly trafficked in the Minneapolis park system.

== Access ==
At its northern end, it is easy for westbound Cedar Lake Trail users to accidentally get on the Kenilworth Trail, since continuing on the Cedar Lake trail requires taking a right turn at a "T" intersection just south of Interstate 394. Cyclists who miss the turn find themselves on the Kenilworth instead. In the south, the Kenilworth Trail entrance is only 0.1 miles (160 m) east of where the Midtown Greenway ends and the Southwest LRT Trail (now known as the Cedar Lake LRT Regional Trail) begins.

== Route ==
The trail starts at the Midtown Greenway, and continues northeast. It crosses Cedar Lake Parkway, and the Cedar Lake Channel. It crosses under Burnham Road, and crosses at-grade 21st Street. It intersects several nature trails and terminates at the Cedar Lake Trail.

== History ==
The trail runs adjacent to a freight railway line that was originally part of the Minneapolis and St. Louis Railway, but is now owned by the Hennepin County Regional Railroad Authority. The Twin Cities and Western Railroad currently operates freight trains on the rail line.

== Management ==
According to the Minneapolis Bicyclist & Pedestrian Count Report from 2013, approximately 2,100 bicyclists and 410 pedestrians are estimated to use the trail daily. As of 2019, annual visits to Kenilworth Trail totaled 746,000, making the corridor "the most intensely used trail in Minneapolis’ park system given its compact size.

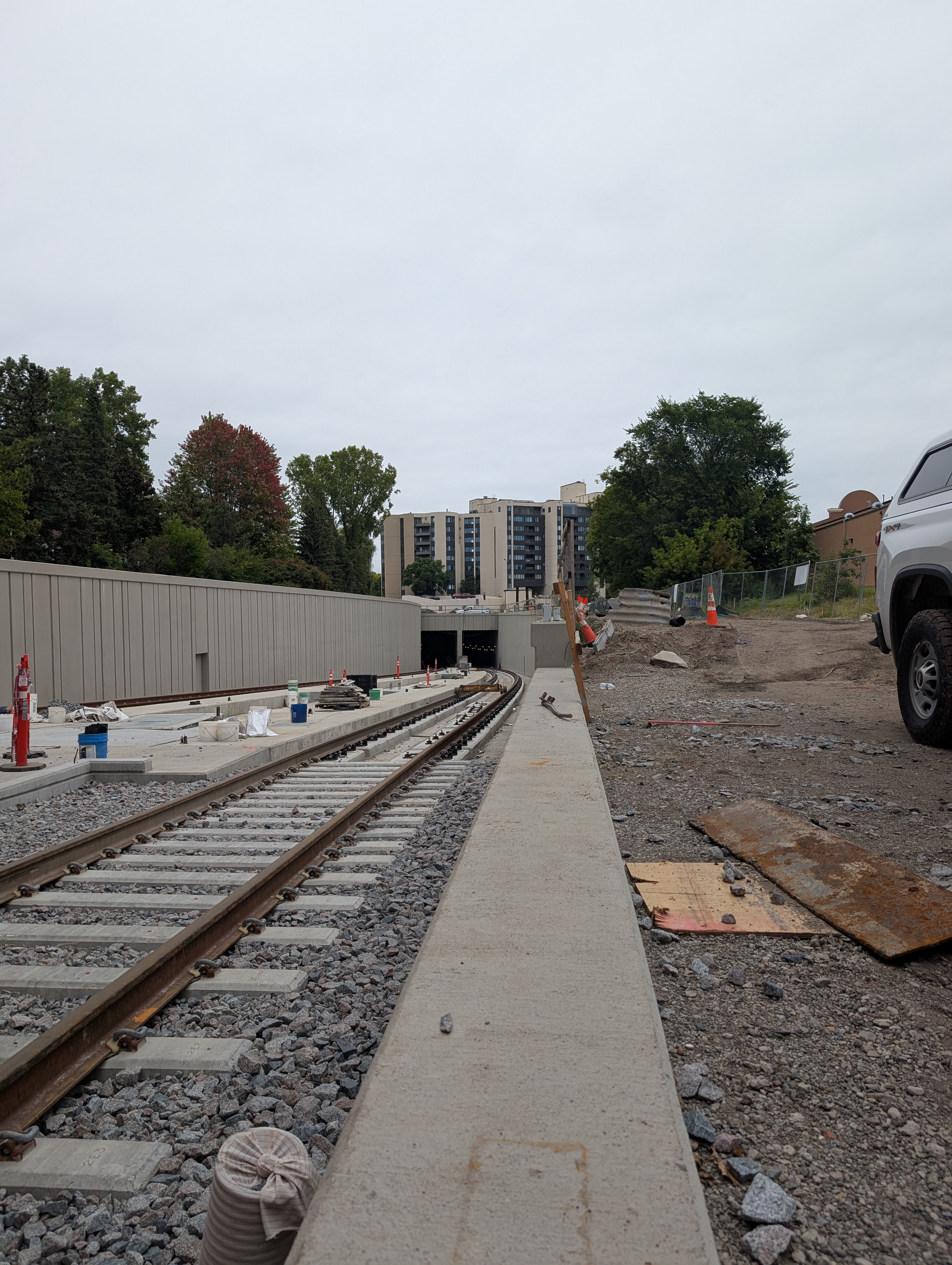
South Portal of the Kenilworth Tunnel and Cedar Isles Condominiums

In May 2019, the City of Minneapolis closed a portion of the Kenilworth Trail due to construction of the Kenilworth Tunnel, part of Metro Green Line Extension project. The full trail reopened in November 2025.

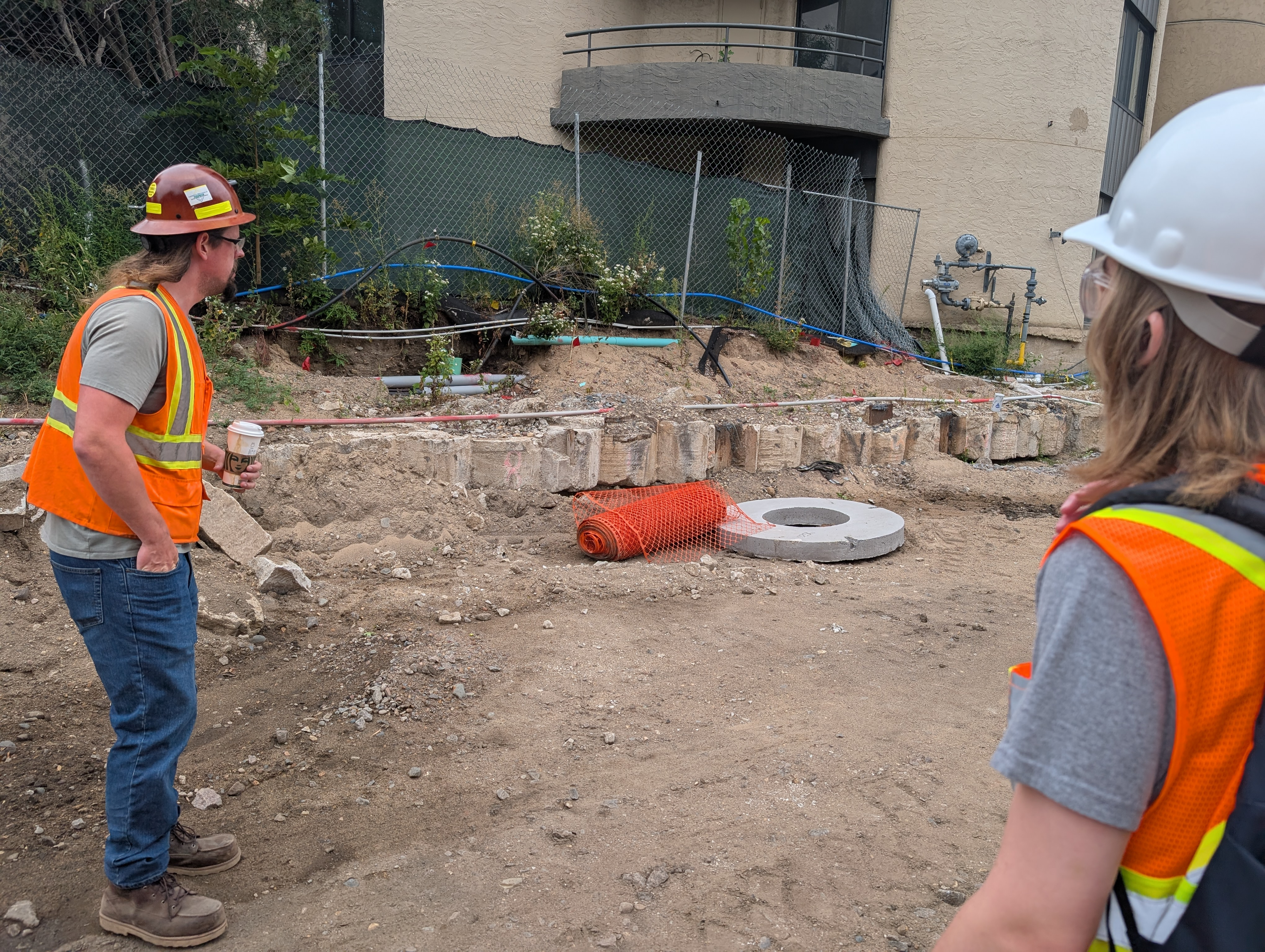
Piling wall built around condo building impacted by Kenilworth Tunnel build

Work on the light rail line stopped in January 2022 after damage was detected at a condo unit near the line, but was cleared to resume in April of that year.

== See also ==
- List of shared-use paths in Minneapolis
