= Midtown Greenway =

Shared-use path in Minneapolis, USA

- Chicago, Milwaukee and St. Paul Railroad Grade Separation
- U.S. National Register of Historic Places
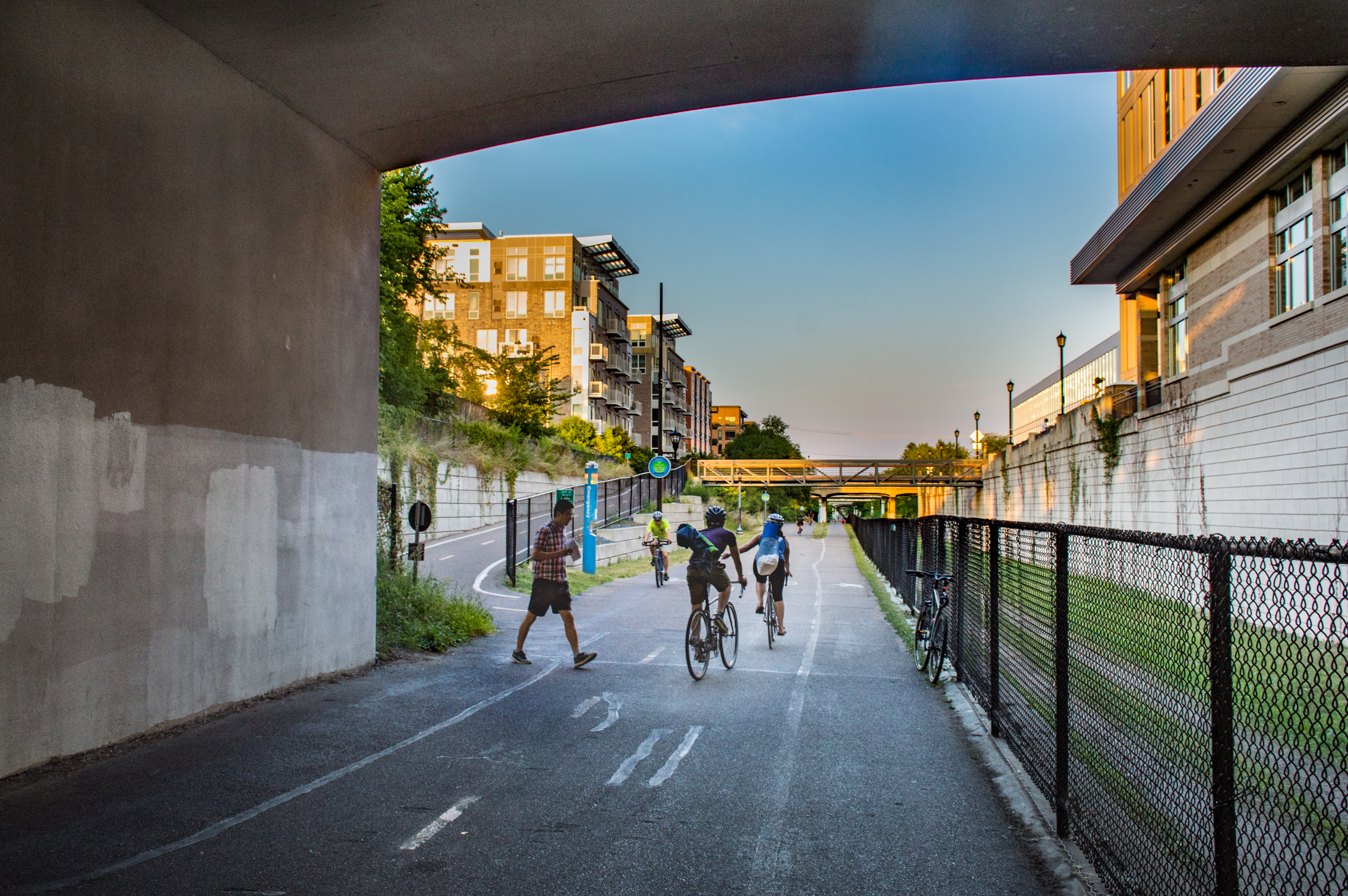
- Midtown Greenway Trail, looking west from beneath the Uptown Transit Center.

- Location within Minnesota Location within the United States
- Location: Minneapolis, Minnesota
- Coordinates: 44°57′00″N 93°17′10″W
- Built: 2000
- Architect: Charles Fredrick Loweth, H.C. Lothholz
- MPS: Reinforced-Concrete Highway Bridges in Minnesota MPS
- NRHP reference No.: 05000508
- Added to NRHP: June 1, 2005

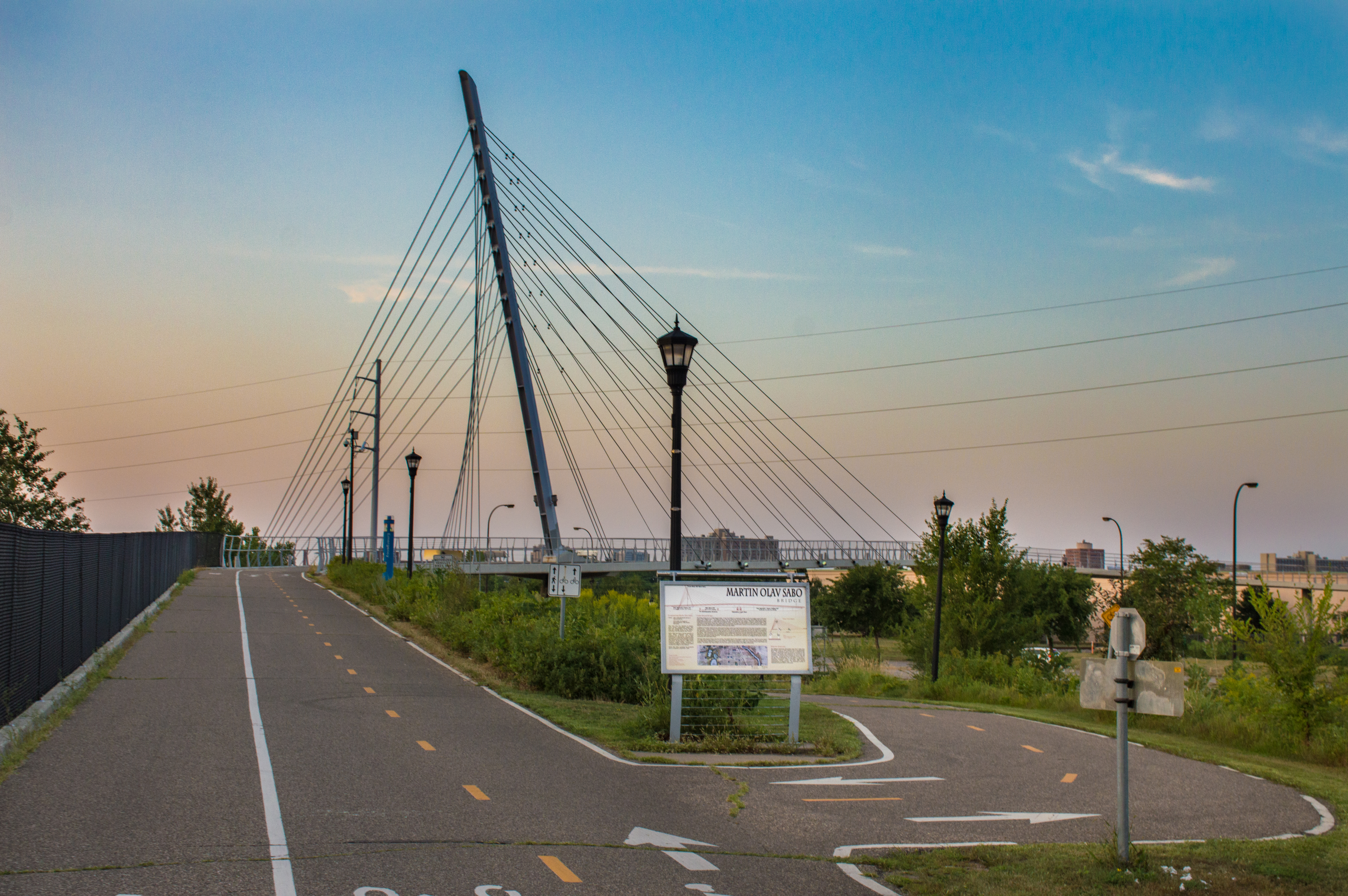
Martin Olav Sabo Bridge

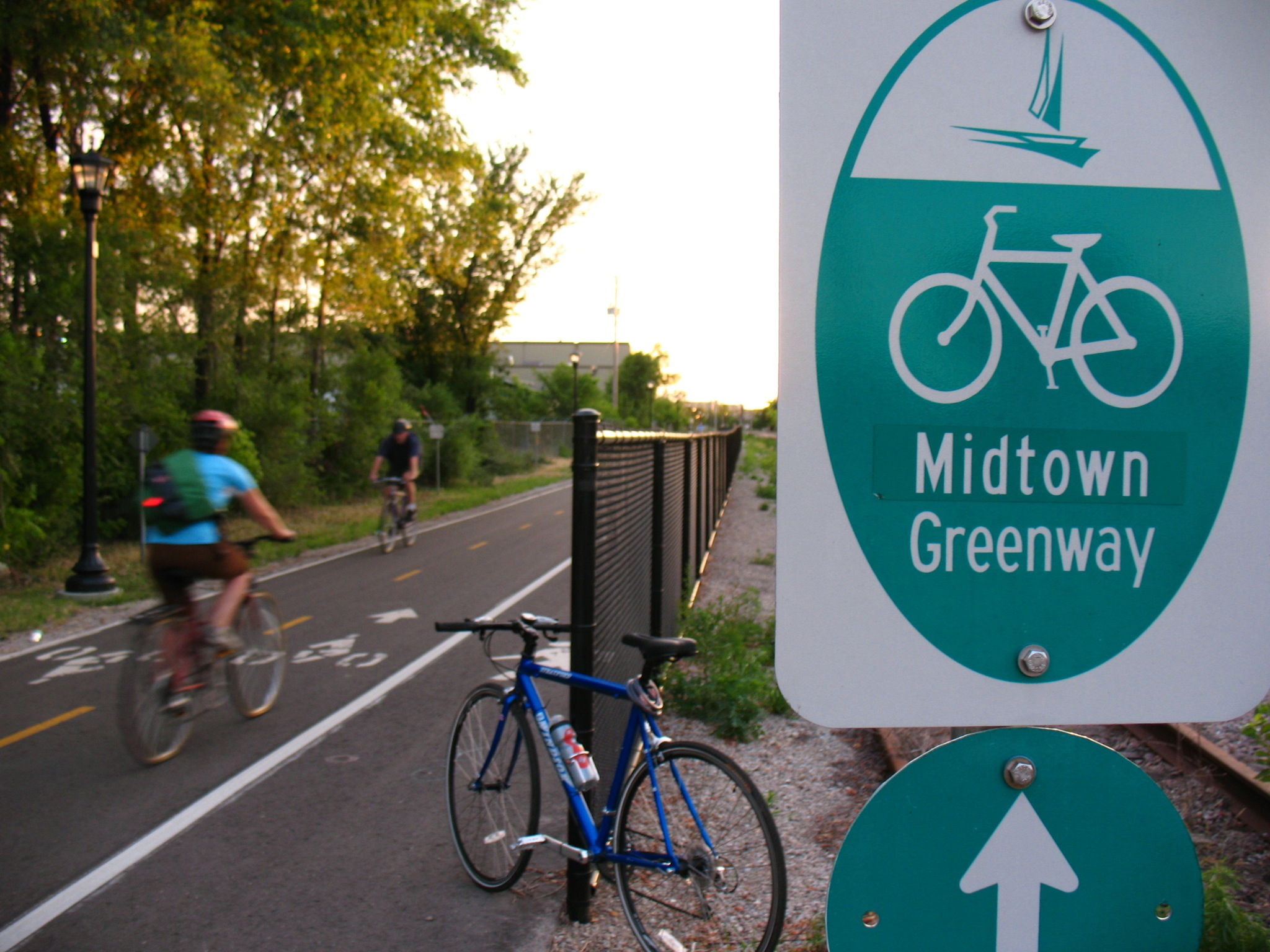
Signs marking the corridor

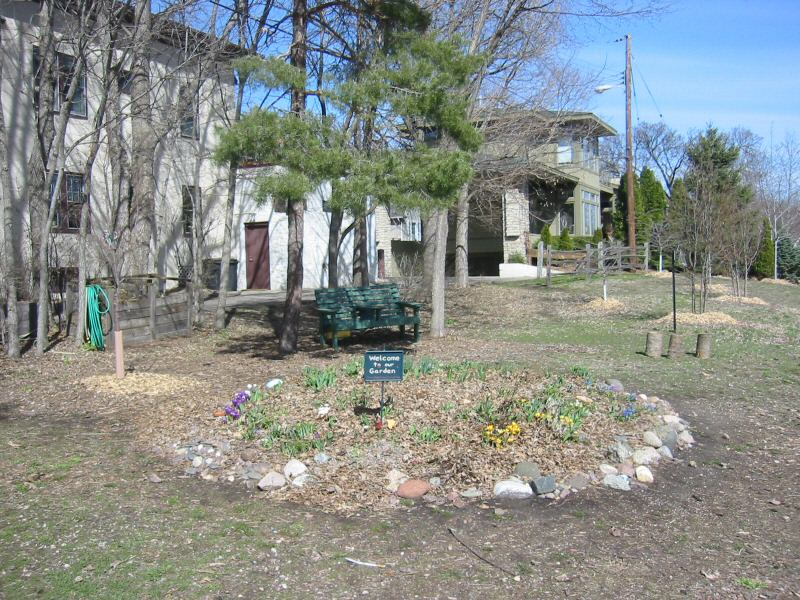
A small community garden along the greenway in the Uptown area of Minneapolis shows some blooming bulbs in early spring of 2006.

The Midtown Greenway is a 5.7-mile (9.2 km) rail trail in Minneapolis, Minnesota, that follows the path of an abandoned route of the Milwaukee Road railway. It is considered under segregated cycle facilities.

Used both recreationally and for commuting, the partially below-grade Greenway runs east–west about one block north of Lake Street. It provides cyclists, inline skaters, runners and pedestrians an almost automobile-free route across the city.

== History ==
The Greenway lies in a former Milwaukee Road railroad corridor along 29th Street. This corridor had been abandoned west of Hiawatha Avenue but is still active east of Hiawatha as part of the Minnesota Commercial Railway. The rail line was originally built between 1879 and 1881; however, as traffic increased, the city of Minneapolis mandated a trench be built between Hiawatha and Irving avenues in 1910. The trench, bridges and retaining walls were evaluated in 1989 as part of the Reinforced-Concrete Highway Bridges in Minnesota MPS, and then listed on the National Register of Historic Places as the Chicago, Milwaukee and St. Paul Railroad Grade Separation. In 1993, the railroad property was purchased by the Hennepin County Regional Railroad Authority.

Phase One of the Greenway opened in August 2000, starting at the intersection of 31st Street and Chowen Avenue, just inside Minneapolis city limits. Running between Lake of the Isles and Bde Maka Ska, the Greenway enters the 29th Street trench near Hennepin Avenue. Phase Two opened in November 2004, running from 5th Avenue to Hiawatha Avenue. The rest of the Greenway to the Mississippi River opened as Phase Three in September 2006. In fall of 2007, the new Martin Olav Sabo Bridge was opened by Hennepin County and the city as Phase Four, eliminating a dangerous at-grade crossing at seven-lane Hiawatha Avenue.

A 5.5 mile section of the greenway was resurfaced in 2021 using a technique called "microsurfacing". The same section was paved again in September 2022 with normal asphalt after a public petition got more than 2,000 signatures over concerns that the new surface was too rough and potentially unsafe.

== Today ==
The Greenway consists of two one-way bike lanes and one two-way walking path, though they are combined in some places with space constrictions. Because of the historic nature of the corridor, it cannot easily be widened or modified.

The Greenway starts near a Lake Street overpass, and continues to the Kenilworth Trail junction. It turns due east, and crosses Dean Parkway on a bridge. It goes in between Bde Maka Ska and Lake of the Isles. it passes over a channel and parkway connecting the two lakes on separate bridges. It has three at grade intersections, at James, Irving, and Humboldt Avenues. It goes into a trench, and passes under 37 bridges, with 20 (as of 2019) of them being built in 1916 or earlier. It has an at-grade junction with 28th Street, and then crosses Hiawatha Avenue on the Martin Olav Sabo Bridge. The trail continues east, and crosses Minnehaha Avenue at-grade. It continues east and crosses local streets. It crosses over 31st Avenue, and 36th Avenue, and passes north of Brackett Park. It then leaves the railroad grade and terminates at West River Parkway.

To the west the Greenway connects directly to what was called the Southwest LRT Trail, named after the future Metro Green Line Extension with which it will share right of way, but is now called the South Cedar Lake Trail overseen by Three Rivers Park District. It also connects to the Kenilworth Trail (which in turn connects to the North Cedar Lake Trail) providing access to downtown Minneapolis and the western suburbs. At its approximate center, on the west side of Sabo bridge the Greenway connects to Little Earth Trail and the surrounding community, and on the east side of the bridge it connects to Hiawatha LRT Trail that reaches Downtown East and Minnehaha Regional Park at each respective end. To the east, the Greenway connects to West River Parkway, a segment of the Grand Rounds Scenic Byway that runs along the Mississippi River.

The Freewheel Bike Center, consisting of a bike store and repair shop, as well as shower and locker facilities, opened in May 2008 at the Midtown Exchange near where the Greenway intersects Chicago Avenue, but closed. In 2023, Venture Bikes opened a bike store with similar amenities in the same location.

Bike traffic on the Greenway has increased 261% between 2003 and 2011.

== Future ==
A fifth phase, which would carry cyclists across the Mississippi River, has an undetermined completion date. Planners hoped to use the Short Line Bridge to St. Paul, though the Canadian Pacific Railway (successor to Milwaukee Road) has not been receptive to the proposal. In addition, engineers have expressed concerns over the safety of the bridge.

Currently plans to use the extra Greenway right-of-way for a streetcar line is also under consideration and has the general support of the Greenway Coalition.
