= 2025 Minneapolis municipal election =

- November 4, 2025

A general election was held in Minneapolis on November 4, 2025. Minneapolis's mayor was up for election as well as all the seats on the City Council, the two elected seats on the Board of Estimate and Taxation, and all the seats on the Park and Recreation Board. Voters were able to rank up to three candidates for each office in order of preference. City offices are formally nonpartisan, though the offices of mayor and city council allow candidates to list a party or preference.

The candidate filing period was from July 29 to August 12, 2025. Early in-person and mail voting began on September 19, 2025.

== Mayor ==
There was an election for Mayor of Minneapolis in 2025. Incumbent Jacob Frey was elected to a third term. The Minneapolis DFL endorsed one of his challengers, Omar Fateh, though the endorsement was later revoked by the state party.

== City Council ==
All 13 seats on the Minneapolis City Council were up for election to a four-year term. Each resident of Minneapolis can elect one city council member in a single-member district. Because of re-districting, members were last elected in 2021 and 2023 for two-year terms instead of the usual four.

== Park and Recreation Board ==
All 6 districts and 3 at-large seats on the Minneapolis Park and Recreation Board were on the ballot in 2025. Meg Forney, Tom Olsen, and Amber Frederick won seats.

=== At-large ===
==== Candidates ====
- Matthew Dowgwillo
- Meg Forney, incumbent commissioner
- Amber Frederick
- Mary McKelvey
- Tim Peterson
- Adam Schneider
- Averi M. Turner
- Tom Olsen, incumbent commissioner
- Michael Wilson

==== Endorsements ====
Amber Frederick

Political parties

- Minneapolis DFL

Labor unions

- Minneapolis Regional Labor Foundation, AFL-CIO
Tom Olsen

Political parties

- Minneapolis DFL

Labor unions

- Minneapolis Regional Labor Foundation, AFL-CIO
Adam Schneider

Political organizations

- 5th CD Green Party of Minnesota
- Twin Cities Democratic Socialists of America
Michael Wilson

Political parties

- Minneapolis DFL

Political organizations

- Twin Cities Democratic Socialists of America

Labor unions

- Minneapolis Regional Labor Foundation, AFL-CIO

==== Results ====
Minneapolis Park and Recreation at-large results
Affiliation	Candidate	FPV (%)	Votes per round					Status
Affiliation	Candidate	FPV (%)	1	2	3	4	5	Status
Non-partisan	Meg Forney	22.38	25,368	26,343	28,610	34,085	28,338 (Note: Elected in previous round; reduction in votes is distributed surplus.)	Elected
Non-partisan	Tom Olsen	20.11	22,796	23,175	25,347	26,665	27,487	Elected
Non-partisan	Amber A. Frederick	15.05	17,056	18,338	20,373	22,261	23,187	Elected
Non-partisan	Michael Wilson	13.49	15,291	15,833	18,617	19,705	19,978	Lost
Non-partisan	Mary McKelvey	10.69	12,116	12,914	14,904	Eliminated		
Non-partisan	Matthew Dowgwillo	6.27	7,112	7,524	Eliminated			
Non-partisan	Adam Schneider	6.25	7,083	7,494	Eliminated			
Non-partisan	Averi M. Turner	5.40	6,118	Eliminated				
Write-ins	—N/a	0.36	408	Eliminated				
Exhausted ballots				1,727	5,497	10,642	14,357	
Total votes			113,348					
Threshold			28,338					
Undervotes			34,354					
Source: Minneapolis Elections & Voter Services

=== District 1 ===
Park Board District 1 is located in northeast and southeast Minneapolis. It includes the whole Northeast community, the neighborhoods of Como, Marshall Terrace, Mid City Industrial, Prospect Park/East River Road, and Sheridan, the University of Minnesota area, and part of Marcy Holmes. Dan Engelhart won the seat with 59% of the vote.

==== Candidates ====
- Dan Engelhart
- Dan Miller

===== Withdrawn =====
- Billy Menz, incumbent commissioner

==== Endorsements ====
Billy Menz (withdrawn)

Labor unions

- Minneapolis Regional Labor Foundation, AFL-CIO
Dan Engelhart

Political parties

- Minneapolis DFL

==== Results ====
Minneapolis Park and Recreation Board District 1 results
Party	Candidate	Round 1	
Party	Candidate	Votes	%
Non-partisan	Dan Engelhart	9,641	59.1%
Non-partisan	Dan Miller	6,582	40.4%
Write-in	Write-ins	89	0.5%
Total active votes		16,312	100.0%
Source: Minneapolis Elections & Voter Services

=== District 2 ===
Park Board District 2 is located in north Minneapolis. It includes the communities of Camden and Near North and part of the North Loop. Charles Rucker won reelection with 98% of the vote.

==== Candidates ====
- Charles Rucker, incumbent commissioner (at-large)

==== Endorsements ====
Charles Rucker

Political parties

- Minneapolis DFL

Labor unions

- Minneapolis Regional Labor Foundation, AFL-CIO

==== Results ====
Minneapolis Park and Recreation Board District 2 results
Party	Candidate	Round 1	
Party	Candidate	Votes	%
Non-partisan	Charles Rucker	8,447	97.70%
Write-in	Write-ins	199	2.30%
Total active votes		8,646	100.0%
Source: Minneapolis Elections & Voter Services

=== District 3 ===
Park Board District 3 is located in south-central Minneapolis. It includes the neighborhoods of Cedar Riverside, Cooper, Corcoran, Howe, Longfellow, Powderhorn Park, Seward, and all of Phillips. Kedar Deshpande won the seat with 98% of the vote.

==== Candidates ====
- Kedar Deshpande

==== Withdrawn ====
- Ilhan Aden
- Hawa Hassan

==== Endorsements ====
Kedar Deshpande

Political parties

- Minneapolis DFL

Labor unions

- Minneapolis Regional Labor Foundation, AFL-CIO

==== Results ====
Minneapolis Park and Recreation Board District 3 results
Party	Candidate	Round 1	
Party	Candidate	Votes	%
Non-partisan	Kedar Deshpande	8,633	98.05%
Write-in	Write-ins	172	1.95%
Total active votes		8,805	100.0%
Source: Minneapolis Elections & Voter Services

=== District 4 ===
District 4 is centrally located in Minneapolis. It includes most of the Central community, the neighborhoods of Bryn Mawr, Cedar-Isles-Dean, Kenwood, Lowry Hill, The Wedge, Nicollet Island, and Whittier, and parts of Marcy Holmes, and East Bde Maka Ska. Incumbent commissioner Elizabeth Shaffer did not seek re-election, instead running for city council in ward 7. Jason Garcia won the seat with a final percentage of 51.5%.

==== Candidates ====
- Jeanette Colby
- Jason Garcia
- Andrew Gebo

===== Withdrawn =====
- Paula Chesley
- Conrad Zbikowski

==== Endorsements ====
Jason Garcia

Political parties

- Minneapolis DFL

Labor unions

- Minneapolis Regional Labor Foundation, AFL-CIO

==== Results ====
Minneapolis Park and Recreation District 4 results
Affiliation	Candidate	FPV (%)	Votes per round		Status
Affiliation	Candidate	FPV (%)	1	2	Status
Non-partisan	Jason Garcia	48.27	9,506	10,142	Elected
Non-partisan	Jeanette Colby	42.92	8,451	8,939	Lost
Non-partisan	Andrew Gebo	8.38	1,650	Eliminated	
Write-ins	—N/a	0.43	85	Eliminated	
Exhausted ballots				611	
Total votes			19,692		
Threshold			9,847		
Undervotes			6,838		
Source: Minneapolis Elections & Voter Services

=== District 5 ===
Park Board District 5 is in South Minneapolis. It covers the Nokomis community and most of Longfellow and Powderhorn. Kay Carvajal Moran won the seat with a final percentage of 52.9%.

==== Candidates ====
- Colton Baldus (Twin Cities CPUSA)
- Kay Carvajal Moran
- Justin Theodore Cermak
- Steffanie Musich, incumbent commissioner
Kay Carvajal Moran

U.S Representatives

- Ilhan Omar, MN-05 (2019–present)

Labor unions

- Minneapolis Regional Labor Foundation, AFL-CIO
- Minnesota Federation of Teachers, MFT59
- LiUNA Minnesota and North Dakota
- AFSCME Council 5

Political Organizations

- Women Winning
Decline to Endorse

Political parties

- Minneapolis DFL

==== Results ====
Minneapolis Park and Recreation District 5 results
Affiliation	Candidate	FPV (%)	Votes per round		Status
Affiliation	Candidate	FPV (%)	1	2	Status
Non-partisan	Kay Carvajal Moran	47.96	12,901	14,237	Elected
Non-partisan	Steffanie Musich	36.39	9,789	10,932	Lost
Non-partisan	Justin Theodore Cermak	9.11	2,451	Eliminated	
Non-partisan	Colton Baldus	6.18	1,661	Eliminated	
Write-ins	—N/a	0.35	95	Eliminated	
Exhausted ballots				1,728	
Total votes			26,897		
Threshold			13,449		
Undervotes			7,571		
Source: Minneapolis Elections & Voter Services

=== District 6 ===
Park Board District 6 is in southwest Minneapolis. It consists of the Southwest community, the neighborhoods of Lyndale, South Uptown, and West Maka Ska, and part of East Bde Maka Ska. Cathy Abene won reelection with 65% of the vote.

==== Candidates ====
- Cathy Abene, incumbent commissioner
- Ira Jourdain

==== Endorsements ====
Ira Jourdain

Political parties

- Minneapolis DFL

Labor unions

- Minneapolis Regional Labor Foundation, AFL-CIO

==== Results ====
Minneapolis Park and Recreation Board District 6 results
Party	Candidate	Round 1	
Party	Candidate	Votes	%
Non-partisan	Cathy Abene	17,746	65.16%
Non-partisan	Ira Jourdain	9,399	34.51%
Write-in	Write-ins	90	0.33%
Total active votes		27,235	100.0%
Source: Minneapolis Elections & Voter Services

== Board of Estimate and Taxation ==
The two directly elected, at-large seats on the Board of Estimate and Taxation were for election. The board also includes the mayor and representatives from the city's other elected bodies. Eric Harris Bernstein and Steve Brandt won seats.

=== Candidates ===
- Eric Harris Bernstein
- Steve Brandt, incumbent
- Bob Fine

=== Withdrawn ===
- Samantha Pree-Stinson, incumbent

=== Endorsements ===
Steve Brandt

Political parties

- Minneapolis DFL
Bob Fine

Political parties

- Minneapolis DFL

=== Results ===
Board of Estimate and Taxation at-large results
Party	Candidate	Round 1	
Party	Candidate	Votes	%
Non-partisan	Eric Harris Bernstein	42,829	40.1%
Non-partisan	Steve Brandt	35,911	33.7%
Non-partisan	Bob Fine	27,445	25.7%
Write-in	Write-ins	497	0.5%
Total active votes		106,682	100.0%
Source: Minneapolis Elections & Voter Services
