= Katie Jones (politician) =

American politician (born 1987/88)

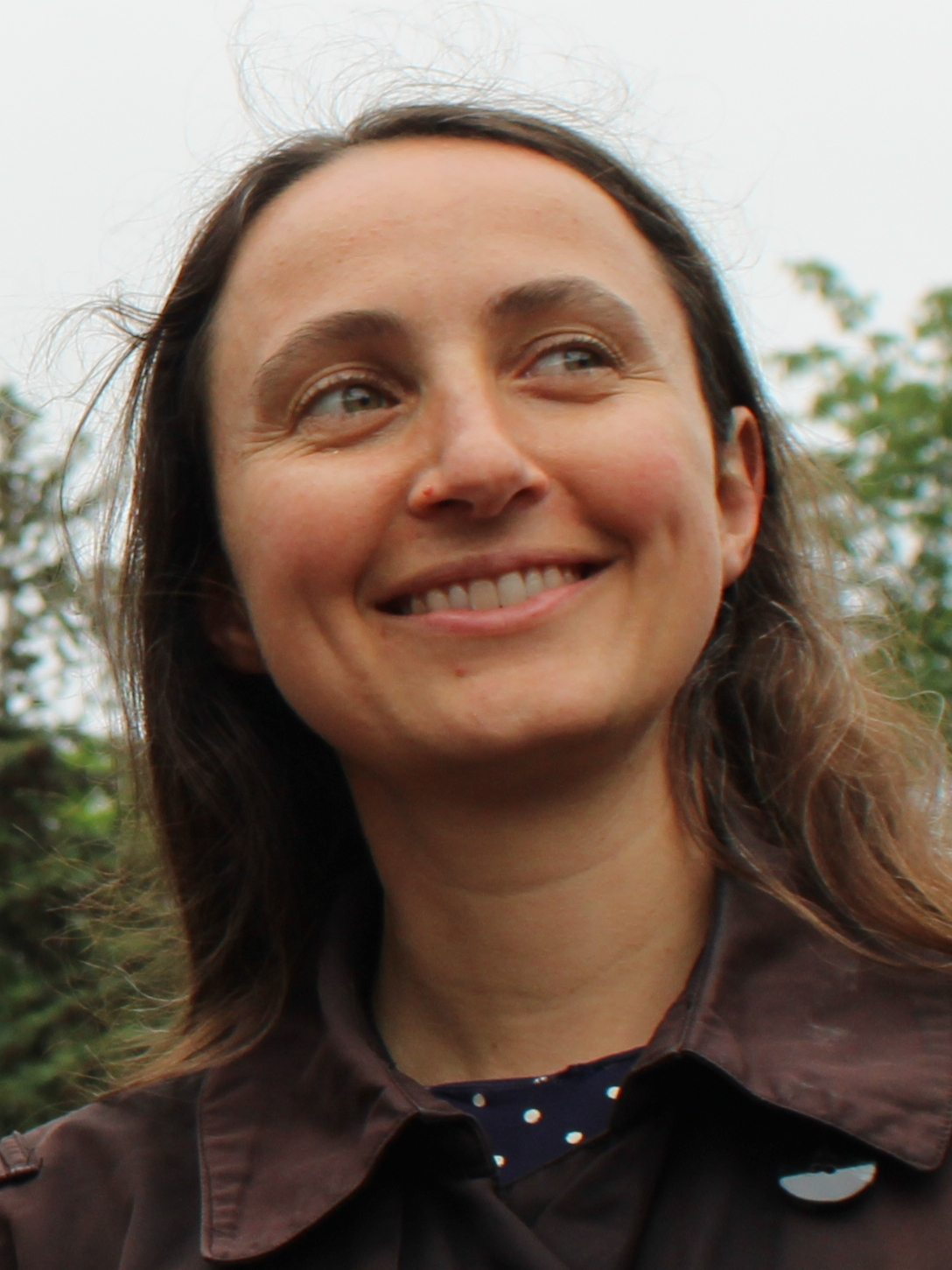
- Jones in 2025

Member of the Minnesota House of Representatives from the 61A district
- Incumbent
- Assumed office January 14, 2025
- Preceded by: Frank Hornstein

Personal details
- Born: 1987 or 1988 (age 38–39) Indiana
- Party: Democratic (DFL)
- Spouse: Peter
- Children: 1
- Education: BS in engineering, Purdue University
- Occupation: Engineer; Legislator; Climate activist

Katie Jones is an American politician and engineer who has represented district 61A in the Minnesota House of Representatives since 2025. Jones is a member of the Minnesota Democratic-Farmer-Labor party.

== Early career ==
Jones grew up in Lebanon, Indiana, and received a Bachelor of Science in engineering from Purdue University. She moved to Minnesota to work with Habitat for Humanity in Rochester before relocating to Minneapolis.

Before beginning her political career, Jones worked as a lobbyist and policy writer with the Center for Energy and Environment (CEE) and did work in the City of Minneapolis's Sustainability Office. She was also a member and president of the Lowry Hill East Neighborhood Association, served on the City of Minneapolis Capital and Long-Range Improvement Committee, and was appointed to Governor Tim Walz's Sustainable Transportation Advisory Council.

In 2021, Jones campaigned to represent Ward 10 (representing Whittier, South Uptown and the Wedge) on the Minneapolis City Council. She was eliminated at third place in the third round of ranked-choice voting, behind Aisha Chughtai and Alicia Gibson, after receiving 19.57% of the first-round votes. Jones then returned to the Capital Long Range Improvement Committee and continued her work with the Center for Energy and Environment.

== Minnesota House of Representatives ==
In February 2024, Representative Frank Hornstein announced he would not seek reelection to the Minnesota House of Representatives after 22 years of service representing district 61A, which includes Loring Park and much of the Bde Maka Ska-Isles area. Jones announced her candidacy for the seat on March 6, 2024. The district DFL caucus did not endorse a candidate, and three candidates filed and appeared on the DFL primary ballot: Jones; Isabel Rolfes, a legislative staffer for House Majority Leader Jamie Long; and Will Stancil, a researcher at the University of Minnesota and online public intellectual.

Jones received online threats from right-wing extremists falsely claiming to be Stancil supporters. Having worked on climate policy in the district, she positioned herself as a successor to Hornstein, who focused much of his policy on climate and chaired the Transportation Committee. Hornstein endorsed her shortly before the primary election, which Jones won with 43.15% of the vote, winning a plurality in all but one of the district's precincts.

No Republican candidates filed for the seat. Jones faced Green Party nominee Toya Lopez. In the general election on November 5, 2024, Jones was elected with 83.92% of the vote.

== Electoral history ==
2021 Minneapolis City Council Election, Ward 10
Party	Candidate	% 1st Choice	Round 1	Round 2	Round 3	% Final
Democratic (DFL)	Aisha Chughtai	36.91%	3,934	4,163	5,360	59.95%
Democratic (DFL)	Alicia Gibson	18.75%	1,999	3,022	3,581	40.05%
Democratic (DFL)	Katie Jones	19.57%	2,086	2,476		
Democratic (DFL)	Chris Parsons	15.10%	1,610			
Democratic (DFL)	David Wheeler	5.86%	625			
Democratic (DFL)	Ubah Nur	3.51%	374			
Write-in	N/A	0.29%	31			
Exhausted ballots				998	1,718	19.21%
Valid votes			10,659			
Threshold			5,330			
Undervotes			686			
Turnout		48.7%	11,345			

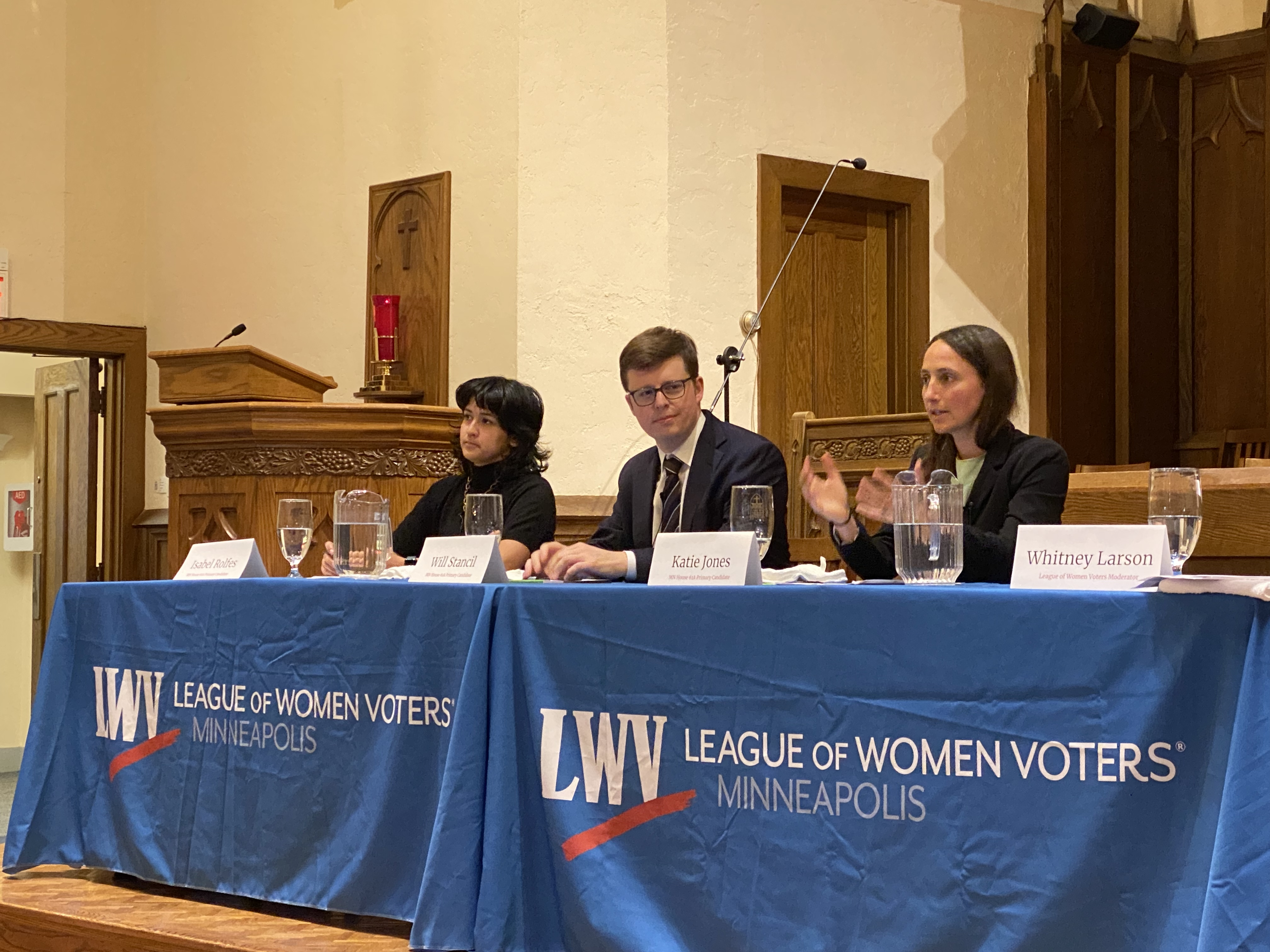
Candidates Rolfes, Stancil, and Jones at a League of Women Voters candidate forum

2024 Minnesota House of Representatives election, District 61A DFL primary
Party	Candidate	Votes	%
Democratic (DFL)	Katie Jones	3,956	43.15
Democratic (DFL)	Will Stancil	3,340	36.43
Democratic (DFL)	Isabel Rolfes	1,872	20.42
Total votes		9,168	100.0

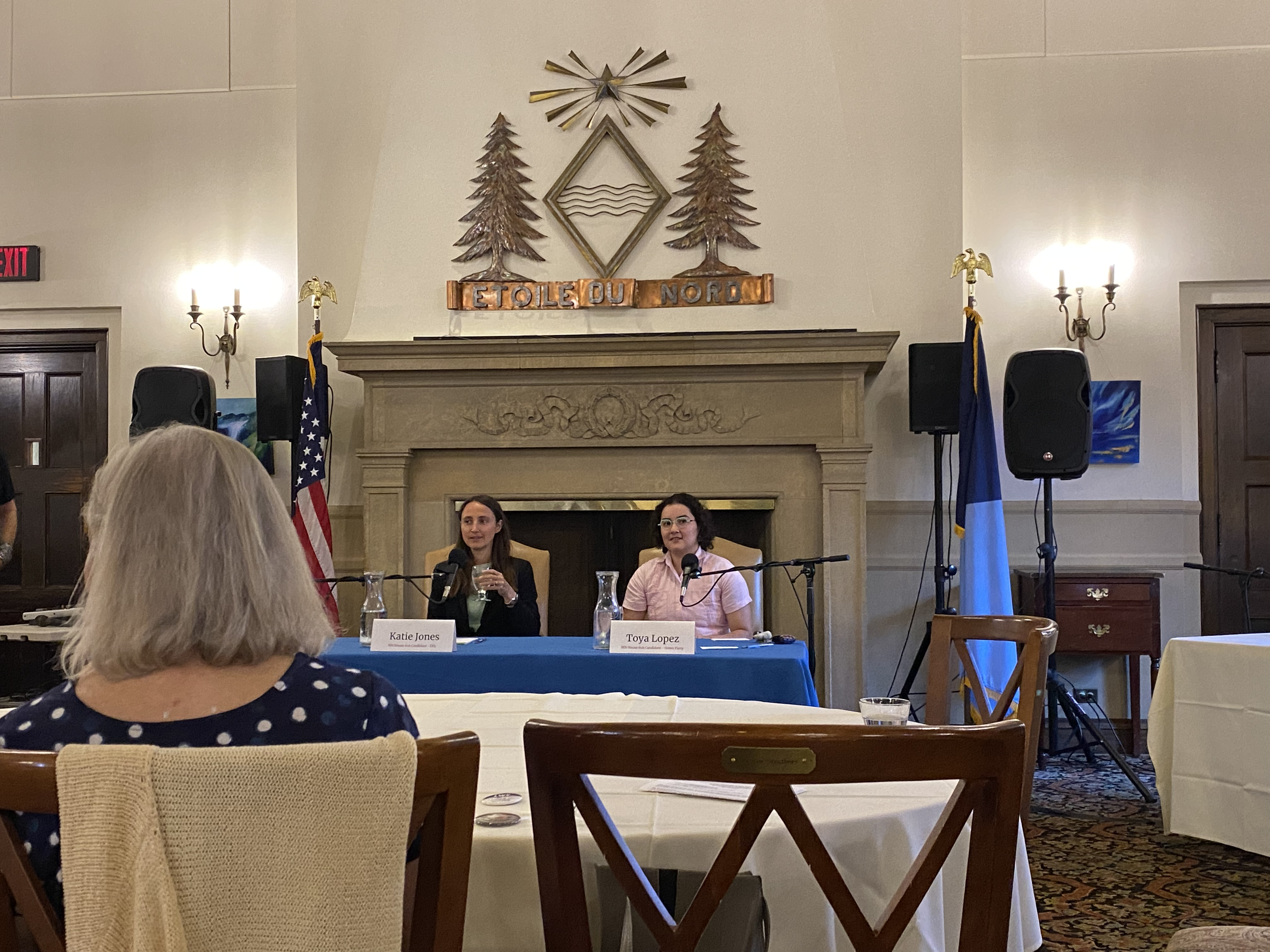
Candidates Jones and Lopez

2024 Minnesota House of Representatives general election, District 61A
Party	Candidate	Votes	%
Democratic (DFL)	Katie Jones	18,234	83.92
Green	Toya López	3,284	15.11
Write-in		209	0.96
Total votes		21,727	100.00
Democratic (DFL) hold			

== Personal life ==
Jones lives in Minneapolis's Wedge neighborhood with her husband, Peter. They have built and live in a straw-bale house. They have a car-free household, and took a cargo e-bike to the hospital for the birth of their child in 2026.
