= Cedar-Isles-Dean, Minneapolis =

Coordinates: 44.9541°N 93.3214°W

Cedar-Isles-Dean
- Neighborhood
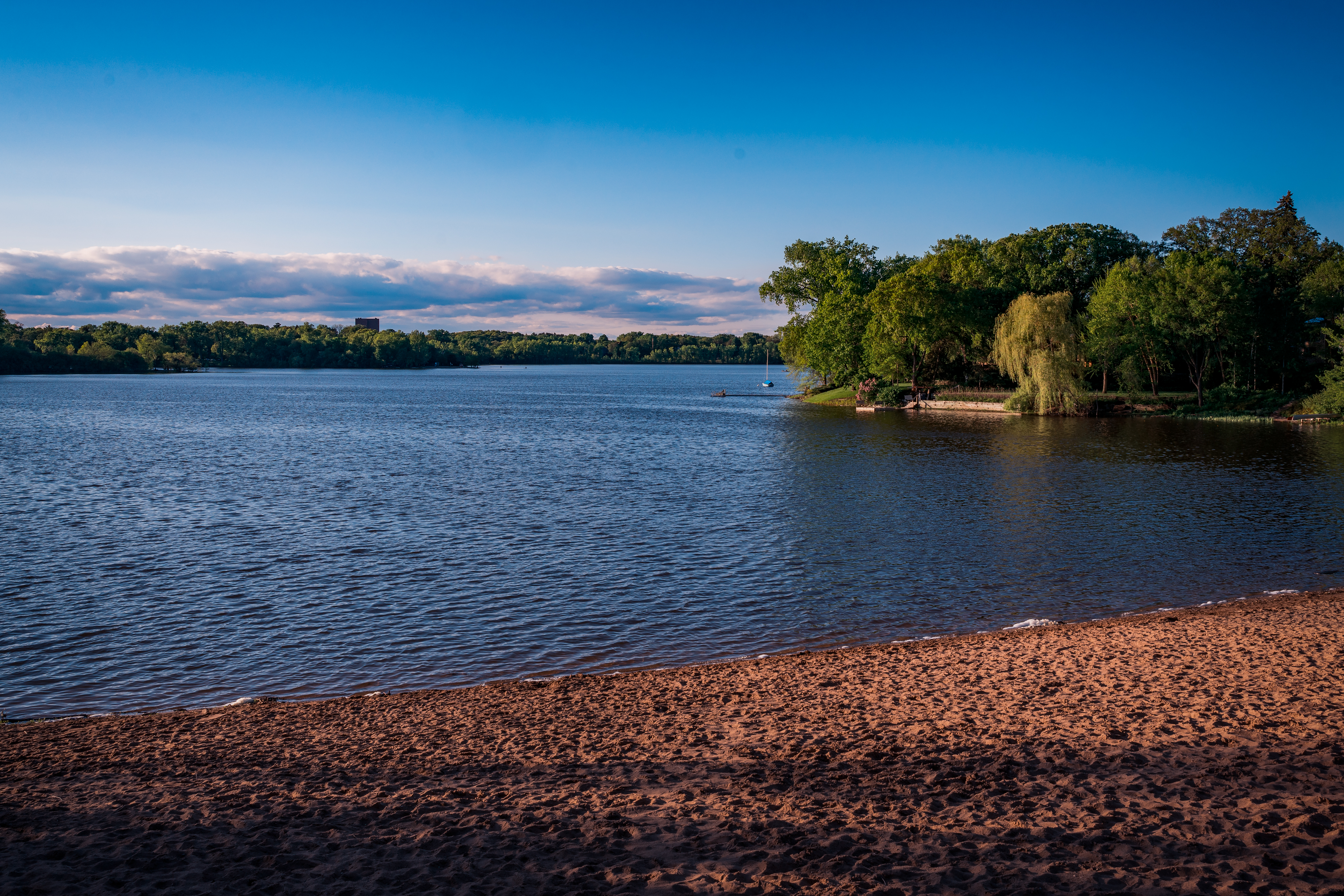
- Cedar Lake

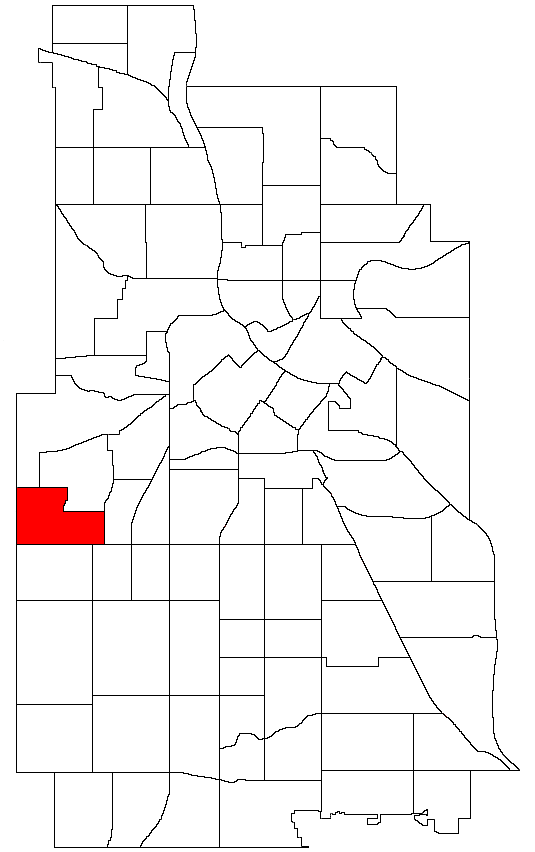
- Location of Cedar-Isles-Dean within the U.S. city of Minneapolis
- Interactive map of Cedar-Isles-Dean
- Country: United States
- State: Minnesota
- County: Hennepin
- City: Minneapolis
- Community: Bde Maka Ska-Isles
- City Council Ward: 7

Government
  - Council Member: Elizabeth Shaffer

Area
  - Total: 0.706 sq mi (1.83 km^{2})

Population (2020)
  - Total: 3,753
  - Density: 5,320/sq mi (2,050/km^{2})
- Time zone: UTC-6 (CST)
  - Summer (DST): UTC-5 (CDT)
- ZIP code: 55416
- Area code: 612

Historical population
Census	Pop.	Note	%±
1980	2,035		—
1990	2,243		10.2%
2000	2,698		20.3%
2010	2,925		8.4%
2020	3,753		28.3%

Cedar-Isles-Dean is a neighborhood in the Bde Maka Ska-Isles community in Minneapolis. Its boundaries are the Kenilworth Lagoon and Lake of the Isles to the north and east, West Lake Street to the south, and France Avenue South to the west. It is in Ward 7 of the Minneapolis City Council and state legislative district 61A.

Nearby neighborhoods include Bryn Mawr and Kenwood to the north, East Isles to the east, East Bde Maka Ska to the southwest, and West Maka Ska to the south. To the west is the suburb of Saint Louis Park. The neighborhood, one of the most affluent in the city, takes its name from Cedar Lake, Lake of the Isles, and Dean Parkway.

The Frank Lloyd Wright-designed Frieda and Henry J. Neils House is located near Cedar Lake in this neighborhood.

== Demographics ==
Race/ethnicity
Race/ethnicity	2000		2010		2020	
Race/ethnicity	Number	%	Number	%	Number	%
White alone	2,524	93.90	2,547	87.89	2,911	85.37
Black alone	50	1.86	58	2.00	86	2.52
Hispanic or Latino (any race)	31	1.15	88	3.04	116	3.40
Native American alone	3	0.11	5	0.17	9	0.26
Asian alone	59	2.19	135	4.66	157	4.60
Other race alone	0	0.00	7	0.24	5	0.15
Pacific Islander alone	0	0.00	0	0.00	0	0.00
Two or more races	21	0.78	58	2.00	126	3.70
Total	2,688	100.0	2,898	100.0	3,410	100.0
