= Bryn Mawr, Minneapolis =

Coordinates: 44.9729°N 93.3136°W

Bryn Mawr
- Neighborhood
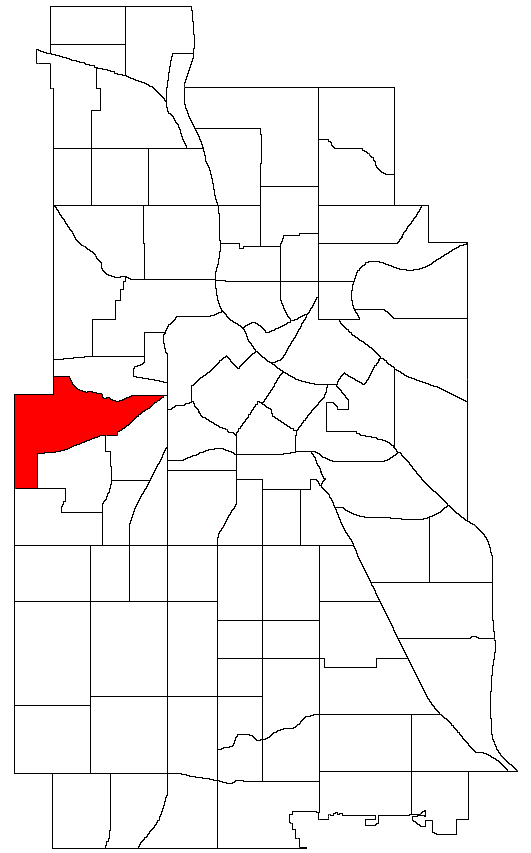
- Location of Bryn Mawr within the U.S. city of Minneapolis
- Interactive map of Bryn Mawr
- Country: United States
- State: Minnesota
- County: Hennepin
- City: Minneapolis
- Community: Bde Maka Ska-Isles
- City Council Ward: 7

Government
  - Council Member: Elizabeth Shaffer

Area
  - Total: 1.348 sq mi (3.49 km^{2})

Population (2020)
  - Total: 2,768
  - Density: 2,053/sq mi (792.8/km^{2})
- Time zone: UTC-6 (CST)
  - Summer (DST): UTC-5 (CDT)
- ZIP code: 55405, 55416
- Area code: 612

Historical population
Census	Pop.	Note	%±
1980	2,777		—
1990	2,845		2.4%
2000	2,663		−6.4%
2010	2,651		−0.5%
2020	2,768		4.4%

Bryn Mawr (/brɪn ˈmɑːr/ brin MAR; from Welsh for 'big hill') is a neighborhood within the Bde Maka Ska-Isles community in Minneapolis located directly west of downtown Minneapolis. It is in Ward 7 of the Minneapolis City Council and state legislative districts 61A and 59B.

Prior to the 1960s, the neighborhood was home to many workers of the nearby Minneapolis and St. Louis Railway yard. The neighborhood is all residential with two small business clusters, and a majority of it is surrounded by parks and hiking trails. The west-northwest border is adjacent to Theodore Wirth Park, while the southwestern perimeter borders Saint Louis Park. The 18-acre Brownie Lake, the northernmost of the Chain of Lakes, is located within Bryn Mawr.

In addition to Theodore Wirth Park, Bryn Mawr is bound by more parkland: Bassett Creek to the north, the Bryn Mawr Meadows park to the east, and Cedar Lake and Cedar Lake park to the south. Nearby neighborhoods include Harrison to the north, Lowry Hill to the southeast, and Kenwood and Cedar-Isles-Dean to the south.

== Demographics ==
As of 2020, the population of Bryn-Mawr was 2,768, split 46.8% male and 53.2% female 99.6% of residents were at least a high school graduate (or equivalent), and 71.8% had earned a bachelor's degree or higher.

3.2% of the population were foreign-born residents, and 5.8% spoke a language other than English at home.

Less than 1% of households had no access to a vehicle. Among workers 16 years and older, 75.1% commuted to work via car, 22.0% walked, biked, or worked at home, with the rest using public transit or some other method. The median household income in Bryn-Mawr was $106,310. 6.2% of residents lived below the poverty line, and 7.3% were unemployed. 85.2% of housing in the neighborhood was owner-occupied.

Race/ethnicity
Race/ethnicity	2000		2010		2020	
Race/ethnicity	Number	%	Number	%	Number	%
White alone	2,450	92.00	2,370	89.40	2,339	84.50
Black alone	69	2.59	56	2.11	90	3.25
Hispanic or Latino (any race)	44	1.65	75	2.83	100	3.61
Native American alone	4	0.15	7	0.26	3	0.11
Asian alone	63	2.37	80	3.02	71	2.57
Other race alone	2	0.08	3	0.11	10	0.36
Pacific Islander alone	1	0.04	0	0.00	0	0.00
Two or more races	30	1.13	60	2.26	155	5.60
Total	2,663	100.0	2,651	100.0	2,768	100.0

== Events ==
- Bryn Mawr Festival of Garage Sales, which started in the 1970s. The event has more than 100 garage sales, as well as food and drink, and draws people from throughout the Greater Twin Cities Area. It is held the first full weekend in May.
- Bryn Mawr Ice Cream Social and Scoop Off is an annual event, hosted by the Bryn Mawr Neighborhood Association, where neighbors can socialize and vote for their favorite ice cream flavors.
- Sip and Stroll, sponsored by Bryn Mawr's businesses, is an annual event, held in October, where neighbors visit local restaurants and stores.

== Media ==
The Bryn Mawr Bugle is published monthly except January.

== Education ==
Bryn Mawr is home to two schools from Minneapolis Public Schools, both located just east of Theodore Wirth Park: Bryn Mawr Elementary School, serving grades preK-5, and Anwatin Middle School, serving grades 6-8. Students in Bryn Mawr are in the attendance area for both schools. The neighborhood is also in the attendance area for North High School, serving grades 9-12.
