= Bde Maka Ska-Isles, Minneapolis =

Community of Minneapolis

Coordinates: 44.9613°N 93.3097°W

Bde Maka Ska-Isles
- Community
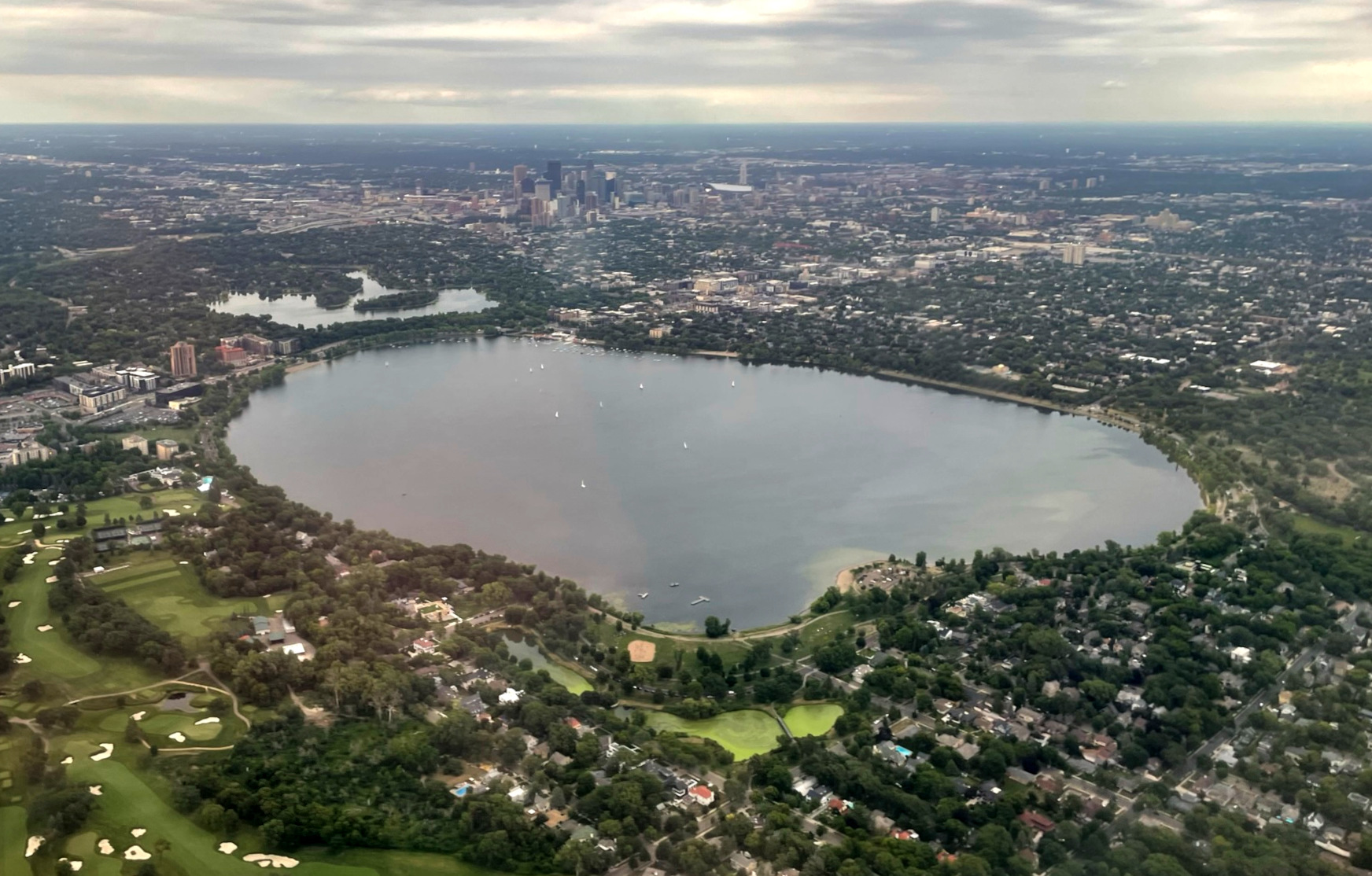
- Aerial photo of Bde Maka Ska viewed from the south

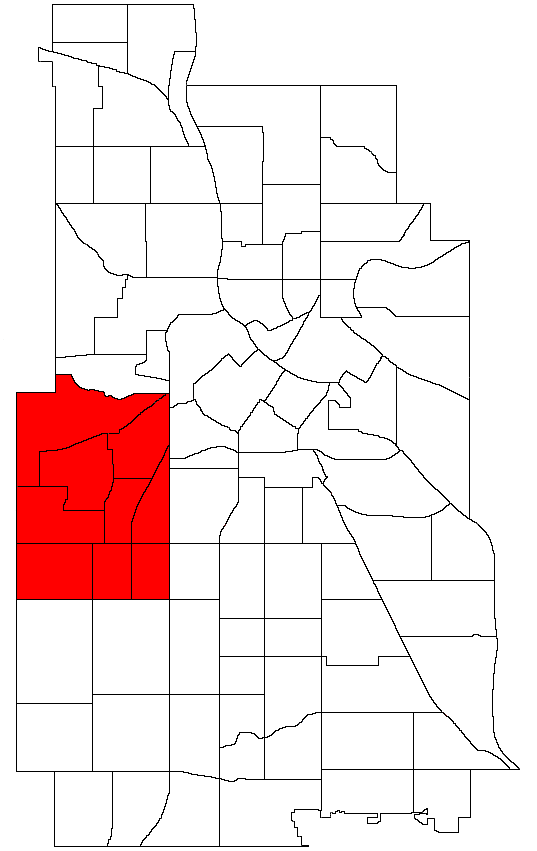
- Location of Bde Maka Ska-Isles within the U.S. city of Minneapolis
- Interactive map of Bde Maka Ska-Isles
- Country: United States
- State: Minnesota
- Counties: Hennepin
- City Council Wards: 7, 10
- Neighborhoods: List: Bryn Mawr; Cedar-Isles-Dean; East Bde Maka Ska; East Isles; Kenwood; Lowry Hill; Lowry Hill East; South Uptown; West Maka Ska

Government
  - Council Member: Elizabeth Shaffer
  - Council Member: Aisha Chughtai

Area
  - Total: 5.520 sq mi (14.30 km^{2})

Population (2020)
  - Total: 35,582
  - Density: 6,446/sq mi (2,489/km^{2})
- Time zone: UTC-6 (CST)
  - Summer (DST): UTC-5 (CDT)
- ZIP code: 55403, 55405, 55408, 55416
- Area code: 612

Historical population
| Census | Pop. | Note | %± |
|---|---|---|---|
| 1980 | 30,779 | | — |
| 1990 | 30,322 | | −1.5% |
| 2000 | 30,430 | | 0.4% |
| 2010 | 29,913 | | −1.7% |
| 2020 | 35,582 | | 19.0% |

Bde Maka Ska-Isles, formerly called Calhoun-Isles, is one of the official communities (a grouping of several official neighborhoods) in the U.S. city of Minneapolis. It is split between Ward 7 and Ward 10 of the Minneapolis City Council.

It contains the Uptown business district and the name "Uptown" is frequently (though somewhat incorrectly) used to refer to the entire community. The name of the community refers to its most prominent physical features, the large and publicly accessible lakes Bde Maka Ska (formerly known as "Lake Calhoun") and Lake of the Isles.

Bde Maka Ska-Isles is an affluent part of the city, and people of upper middle class means and above, including young professionals and older millionaires, inhabit the community.

== Neighborhoods of Bde Maka Ska-Isles ==
- Bryn Mawr
- Cedar-Isles-Dean
- East Bde Maka Ska
- East Isles
- Kenwood
- Lowry Hill
- Lowry Hill East
- South Uptown
- West Maka Ska
