= South Uptown, Minneapolis =

Neighborhood of Minneapolis, Minnesota, US

Coordinates: 44.94330°N 93.29332°W

South Uptown
- Neighborhood
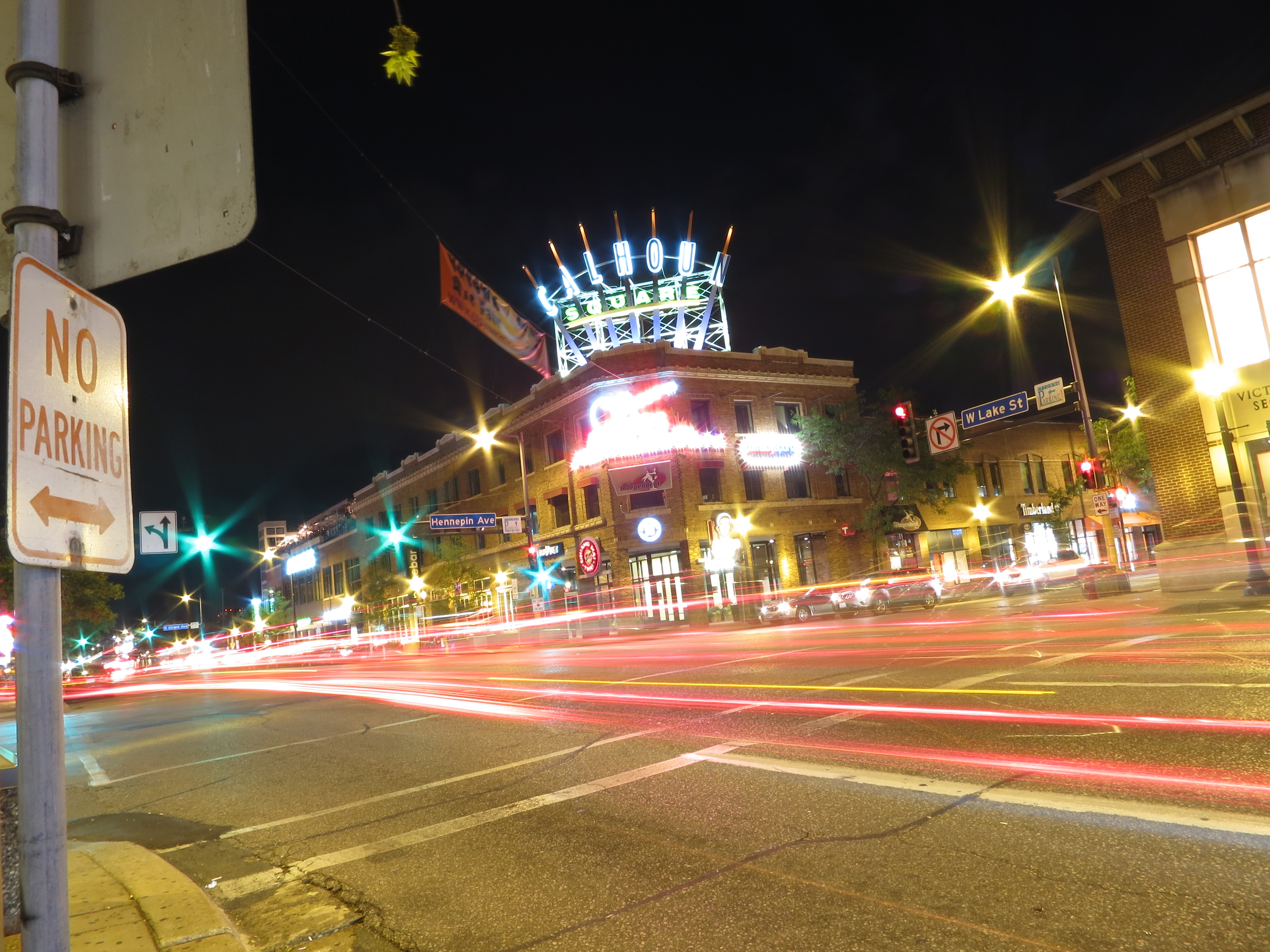
- Hennepin Ave & Lake St

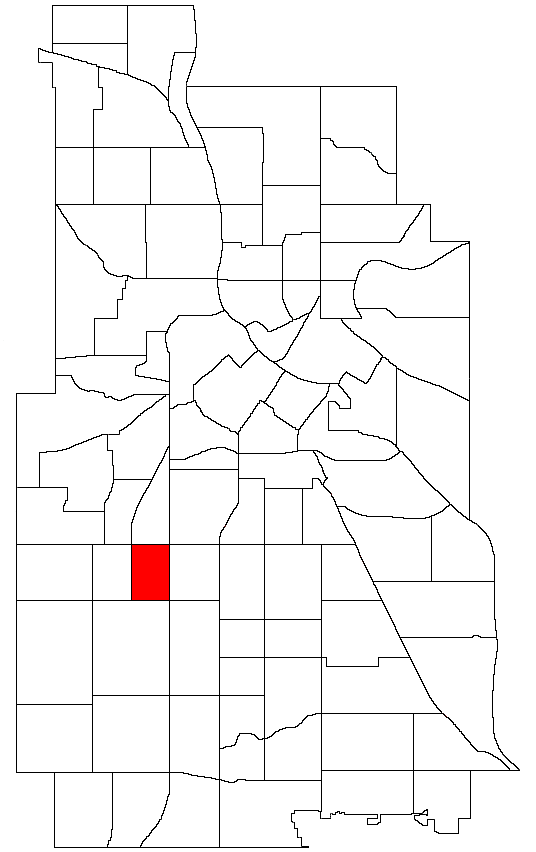
- Location of South Uptown within the U.S. city of Minneapolis
- Interactive map of South Uptown
- Country: United States
- State: Minnesota
- County: Hennepin
- City: Minneapolis
- Community: Bde Maka Ska-Isles
- City Council Ward: 10

Government
  - Council Member: Aisha Chughtai

Area
  - Total: 0.367 sq mi (0.95 km^{2})

Population (2020)
  - Total: 6,075
  - Density: 16,600/sq mi (6,390/km^{2})
- Time zone: UTC-6 (CST)
  - Summer (DST): UTC-5 (CDT)
- ZIP code: 55408
- Area code: 612

Historical population
Census	Pop.	Note	%±
1980	6,223		—
1990	5,825		−6.4%
2000	5,907		1.4%
2010	5,647		−4.4%
2020	6,075		7.6%

South Uptown is a residential neighborhood in the Bde Maka Ska-Isles community of Minneapolis, Minnesota.

In 2018, the neighborhood voted to change its name to South Uptown from its former name, Calhoun Area Residents' Action Group (CARAG) after its namesake, the former Lake Calhoun, was renamed to Bde Maka Ska. Other potential names for the neighborhood included "Bryant Park" and "Bryant Square". The Minneapolis City Council approved the name change in November 2018.

It is located directly south of Lowry Hill East and directly east of East Bde Maka Ska. Its boundaries are Lake Street to the north, Lyndale Avenue to the east, 36th Street to the south, and Hennepin Avenue to the west. South Uptown, Lowry Hill East, East Bde Maka Ska and East Isles form the business district of Uptown.

It is in Ward 10, represented by council member Aisha Chughtai.

== Demographics ==
Race/ethnicity
Race/ethnicity	2000		2010		2020	
Race/ethnicity	Number	%	Number	%	Number	%
White alone	5,087	86.12	4,630	82.00	4,649	79.08
Black alone	281	4.76	321	5.68	348	5.92
Hispanic or Latino (any race)	168	2.84	270	4.78	364	6.19
Native American alone	54	0.91	59	1.04	21	0.36
Asian alone	177	3.00	188	3.33	164	2.79
Other race alone	11	0.19	12	0.21	33	0.56
Pacific Islander alone	7	0.12	1	0.02	2	0.03
Two or more races	122	2.07	166	2.94	298	5.07
Total	5,907	100.0	5,647	100.0	5,879	100.0
