= West Maka Ska, Minneapolis =

Coordinates: 44.9446°N 93.3265°W

West Maka Ska
- Neighborhood
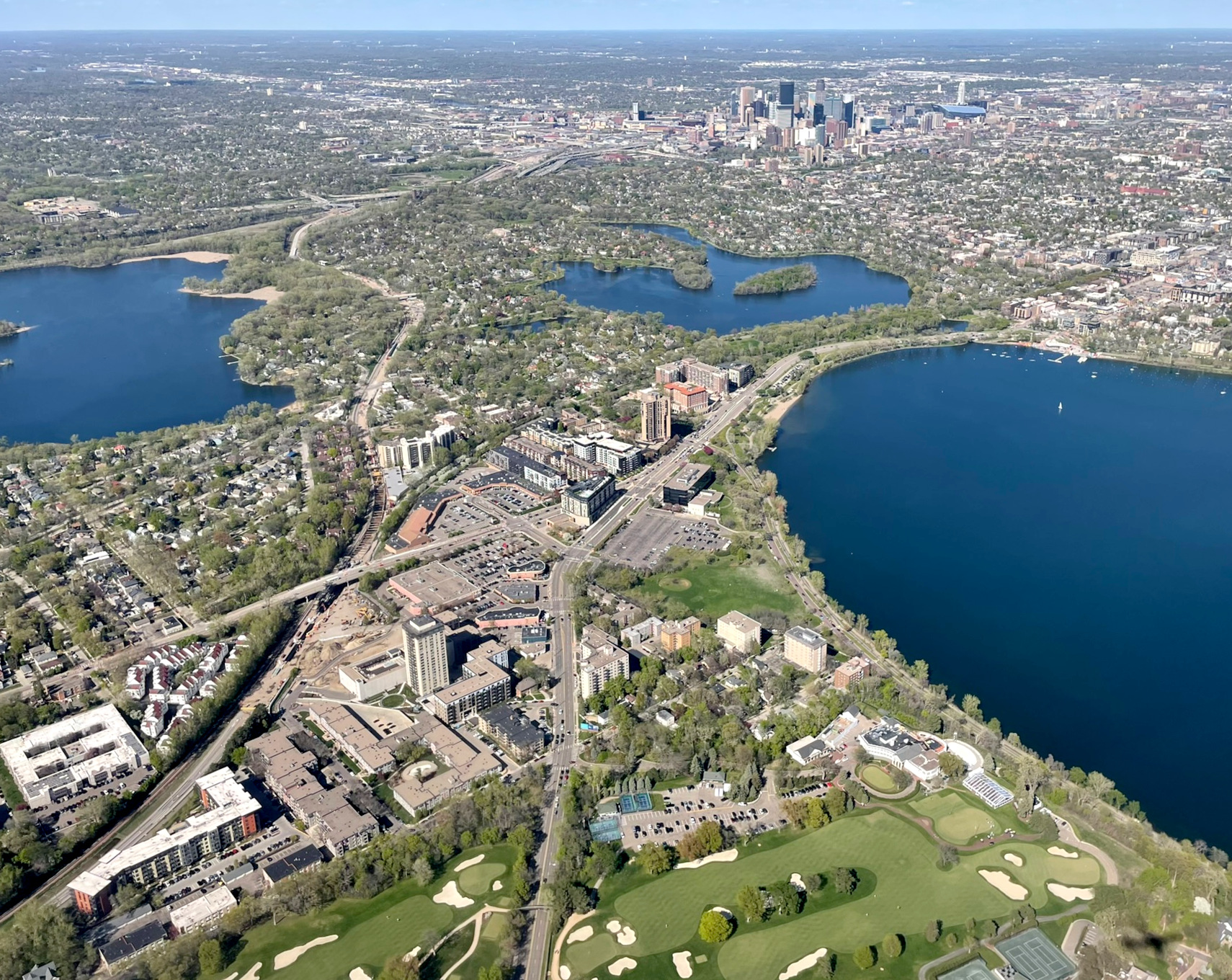
- West Maka Ska (middle/bottom) with Bde Maka Ska on right and Minneapolis in the background

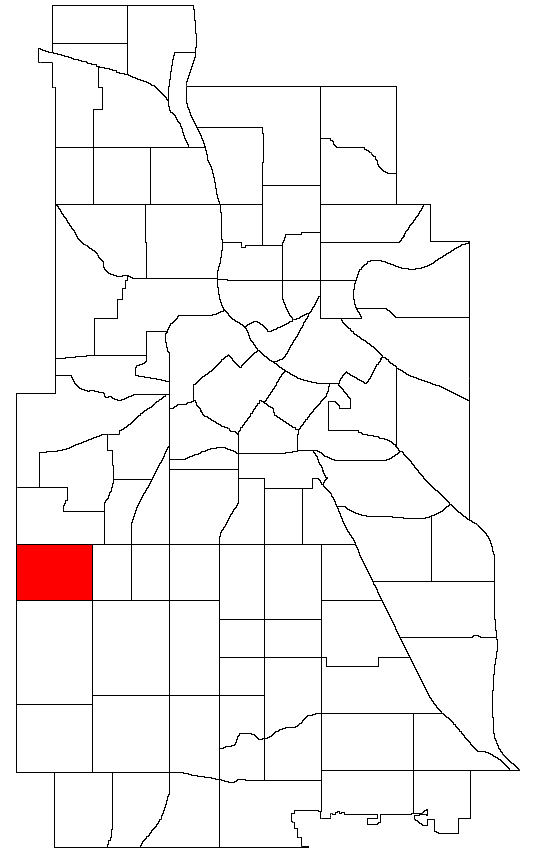
- Location of West Maka Ska within the U.S. city of Minneapolis
- Interactive map of West Maka Ska
- Country: United States
- State: Minnesota
- County: Hennepin
- City: Minneapolis
- Community: Bde Maka Ska-Isles
- City Council Ward: 7

Government
  - Council Member: Katie Cashman

Area
  - Total: 0.674 sq mi (1.75 km^{2})

Population (2020)
  - Total: 2,645
  - Density: 3,920/sq mi (1,520/km^{2})
- Time zone: UTC-6 (CST)
  - Summer (DST): UTC-5 (CDT)
- ZIP code: 55416
- Area code: 612

Historical population
Census	Pop.	Note	%±
1980	1,595		—
1990	1,874		17.5%
2000	1,865		−0.5%
2010	1,740		−6.7%
2020	2,645		52.0%

West Maka Ska, formerly known as West Calhoun, is a neighborhood in the U.S. city of Minneapolis. The neighborhood was generally rural with a couple grain silos along the railroad track heading into Downtown Minneapolis until about the 1910s. Although the railroad still runs through the neighborhood, the neighborhood is now mainly homes, apartment buildings, and strip malls.

West Maka Ska is the southwestern-most neighborhood of the Bde Maka Ska-Isles community in the western part of the city. It is in Ward 7, represented by council member Katie Cashman.

The neighborhood is bordered on the east by East Bde Maka Ska, the north by Cedar-Isles-Dean, the south by Linden Hills and the west by the city of St. Louis Park. Its boundaries are Lake Street to the north, Bde Maka Ska to the east, 36th Street to the south, and France Avenue to the west.

== History ==
In 2020, the neighborhood voted to change their name to West Maka Ska from West Calhoun after the name change of Bde Maka Ska from Lake Calhoun.

== Demographics ==
Race/ethnicity
Race/ethnicity	2000		2010		2020	
Race/ethnicity	Number	%	Number	%	Number	%
White alone	1,661	89.06	1,507	85.63	1,821	85.21
Black alone	54	2.90	70	3.98	92	4.31
Hispanic or Latino (any race)	40	2.14	61	3.47	60	2.81
Native American alone	2	0.11	7	0.40	2	0.09
Asian alone	78	4.18	75	4.26	90	4.21
Other race alone	4	0.21	3	0.17	6	0.28
Pacific Islander alone	1	0.05	0	0.00	2	0.09
Two or more races	25	1.34	37	2.10	64	2.99
Total	1,865	100.0	1,760	100.0	2,137	100.0
