= East Bde Maka Ska, Minneapolis =

East Bde Maka Ska
- Neighborhood
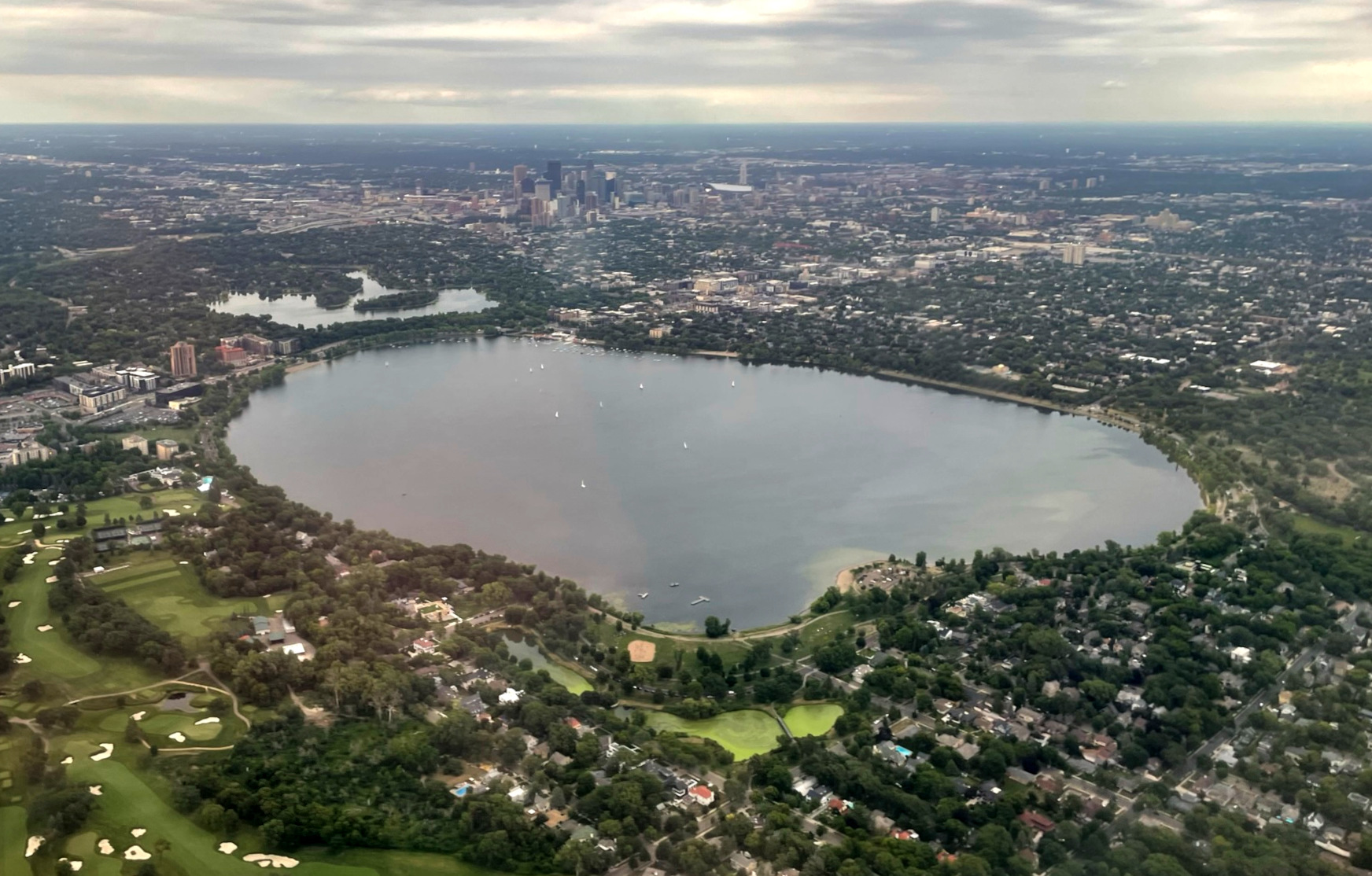
- Aerial photo of Bde Maka Ska viewed from the south

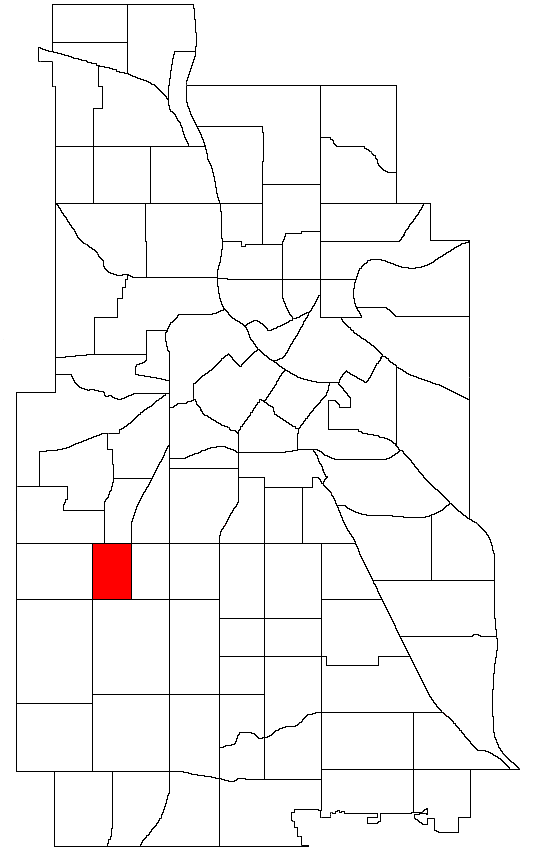
- Location of East Bde Maka Ska within the U.S. city of Minneapolis
- Interactive map of East Bde Maka Ska
- Coordinates: 44°56′34″N 93°18′3″W
- Country: United States
- State: Minnesota
- County: Hennepin
- City: Minneapolis
- Community: Bde Maka Ska-Isles
- Founded: 1849
- City Council Ward: 10

Government
  - Council Member: Aisha Chughtai

Area
  - Total: 0.425 sq mi (1.10 km^{2})

Population (2020)
  - Total: 2,619
  - Density: 6,160/sq mi (2,380/km^{2})
- Time zone: UTC-6 (CST)
  - Summer (DST): UTC-5 (CDT)
- ZIP code: 55408
- Area code: 612

Historical population
Census	Pop.	Note	%±
1980	2,649		—
1990	2,495		−5.8%
2000	2,545		2.0%
2010	2,457		−3.5%
2020	2,619		6.6%

East Bde Maka Ska is a neighborhood within the Bde Maka Ska-Isles community in the U.S. city of Minneapolis. It was known as East Calhoun prior to August 2021.

The neighborhood is located south of the East Isles neighborhood and its northern portion along with parts of the East Isles, Lowry Hill East, and South Uptown neighborhoods forms the city's Uptown district. East Bde Maka Ska is bordered on the north by Lake Street, on the east by Hennepin Avenue, on the south by West 36th Street and on the west by Bde Maka Ska. It is in Ward 10, represented by council member Aisha Chughtai.

== History ==
=== Neighborhood name ===
East Bde Maka Ska is named for the lake that forms its western border, Bde Maka Ska.

The neighborhood was initially named East Calhoun, after the former name for the lake, Lake Calhoun. In the aftermath of murder of George Floyd and greater awareness of racial justice issues, community members sought to change the name. The Minneapolis City Council approved a name change to East Bde Maka Ska change on July 23, 2021, which became effective July 31, 2021. The East Bde Maka Ska name is intended to honor the history of the Dakota people in the area.

=== Environmental conservation ===
The neighborhood has been recognized for its environmental conservation efforts. It was one of the first neighborhoods in the Minneapolis area to adopt organic waste recycling, a relatively new waste management solution, and has been used as an example of a successful organics recycling project. The city of Minneapolis placed a curbside organic waste pickup pilot program in the neighborhood in 2015.

== Demographics ==
Race/ethnicity
Race/ethnicity	2000		2010		2020	
Race/ethnicity	Number	%	Number	%	Number	%
White alone	2,267	89.08	2,190	89.13	2,133	81.44
Black alone	55	2.16	54	2.20	84	3.21
Hispanic or Latino (any race)	62	2.44	72	2.93	143	5.46
Native American alone	5	0.20	8	0.33	14	0.53
Asian alone	105	4.13	92	3.74	97	3.70
Other race alone	6	0.24	1	0.04	16	0.61
Pacific Islander alone	0	0.00	0	0.00	0	0.00
Two or more races	45	1.77	40	1.63	132	5.04
Total	2,545	100.0	2,457	100.0	2,619	100.0

== See also ==
- Bde Maka Ska Public Art Project
