= East Isles, Minneapolis =

East Isles
- Neighborhood
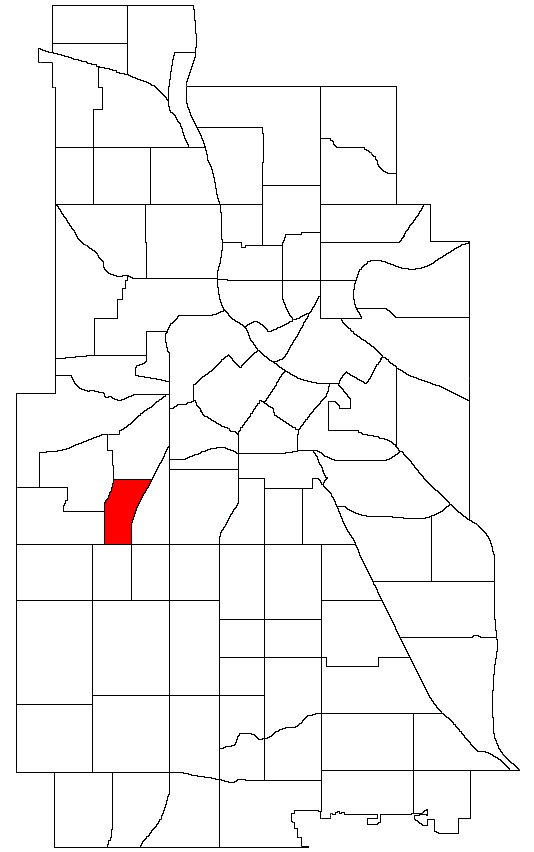
- Location of East Isles within the U.S. city of Minneapolis
- Interactive map of East Isles
- Country: United States
- State: Minnesota
- County: Hennepin
- City: Minneapolis
- Community: Bde Maka Ska-Isles
- Founded: 1849
- City Council wards: 7, 10

Government
  - Council member: Elizabeth Shaffer
  - Council member: Aisha Chughtai

Area
  - Total: 0.332 sq mi (0.86 km^{2})
- Elevation: 849 ft (259 m)

Population (2020)
  - Total: 3,702
  - Density: 11,200/sq mi (4,310/km^{2})
- Time zone: UTC-6 (CST)
  - Summer (DST): UTC-5 (CDT)
- ZIP code: 55405, 55408
- Area code: 612

East Isles is a neighborhood within the larger Bde Maka Ska Isles community in Minneapolis, Minnesota, United States.

It lies between Hennepin Avenue to the east, Lake of the Isles to the west, West Lake Street to the south, and West 22nd Street to the north. Together with parts of Lowry Hill East and other nearby neighborhoods, East Isles is part of the larger, unofficial, Uptown neighborhood. It is mostly located in ward 7 of the Minneapolis City Council and state legislative district 61A; a few blocks on the far south of the neighborhood are in council ward 10 and legislative district 61B.

The neighborhood was originally a part of the more historically affluent neighborhoods around Lake of the Isles: Kenwood and Lowry Hill. However, since the 1940s, it has become more urbanized than the rest of the community, since numerous apartment buildings have been built in the area. Old mansions still can be found in the neighborhood.

== History ==
Architects William Gray Purcell and George Grant Elmslie designed the Catherine Gray House in this neighborhood, at 2409 Lake of the Isles Boulevard; it is currently owned by Brian and Mary Longe. Purcell built the Catherine Gray House (his first project) for his grandmother, who funded the project to help Purcell and Elmslie launch their new firm. Purcell lived in the house with his grandmother until he married his wife Edna. After many years of alterations and much white paint, the house had lost most of its Prairie School characteristics. The Longes completed an extensive historical restoration to the exterior in 2005-2006, returning it to its original appearance. It is a fine example of early Prairie School in Minneapolis.

Behind the Catherine Gray House, on Lake Place, is another significant project by Purcell & Elmslie - the Purcell-Cutts House. The Purcell-Cutts House was originally called the Edna Purcell House, named for his wife. Purcell and his wife lived in this home and raised their two sons there. The Cutts family bought the house years later and lived there for many years. They donated the home to the Minneapolis Institute of Art. The home is now operated as a museum and is open to the public for tours. Signs denoting the neighborhood incorporate the window designs of this house.

== Demographics ==
Race/ethnicity
Race/ethnicity	2000		2010		2020	
Race/ethnicity	Number	%	Number	%	Number	%
White alone	3,080	92.22	2,812	88.73	2,866	82.29
Black alone	53	1.59	58	1.83	116	3.33
Hispanic or Latino (any race)	69	2.07	95	3.00	177	5.08
Native American alone	8	0.24	6	0.19	6	0.17
Asian alone	71	2.13	110	3.47	131	3.76
Other race alone	13	0.39	6	0.19	19	0.55
Pacific Islander alone	2	0.06	2	0.06	6	0.17
Two or more races	44	1.32	80	2.52	162	4.65
Total	3,340	100.0	3,169	100.0	3,483	100.0

Historical population
Census	Pop.	Note	%±
1980	3,386		—
1990	3,498		3.3%
2000	3,340		−4.5%
2010	3,169		−5.1%
2020	3,702		16.8%
