= Uptown, Minneapolis =

Uptown Minneapolis
- Commercial District
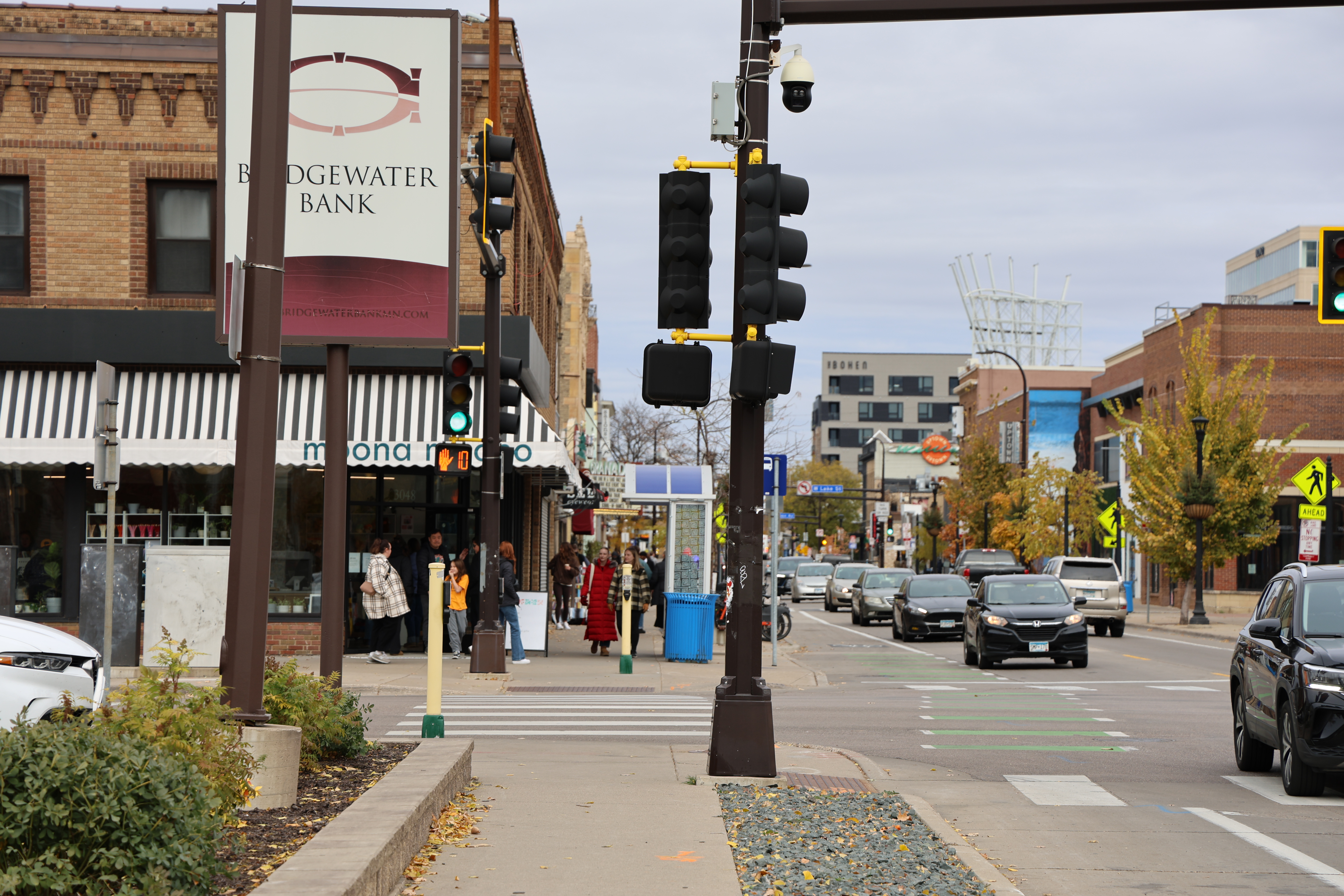
- Businesses on Hennepin Avenue in November 2025.
- Motto: "Normally out of the ordinary"
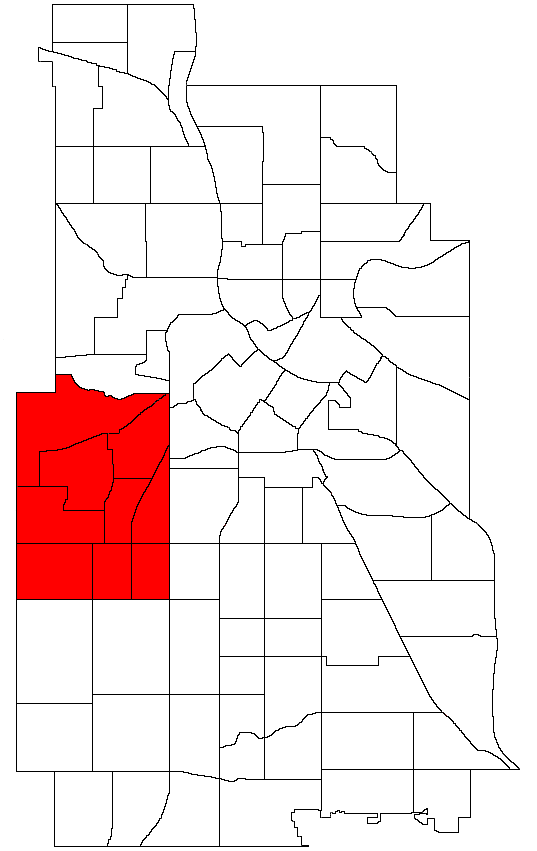
- Uptown is largely within the Bde Maka Ska- Isles community of the U.S. city of Minneapolis
- Coordinates: 44°56′56″N 93°17′55″W
- Country: United States
- State: Minnesota
- County: Hennepin
- City: Minneapolis
- Community: Bde Maka Ska-Isles
- Branded: 1920s
- Founder: Uptown businessmen created "Uptown" name for area
- Named for: Desire to create an Uptown-like district similar to Chicago
- Time zone: UTC-6 (CST)
  - Summer (DST): UTC-5 (CDT)
- Area code: 612

Uptown is a commercial district in southwestern Minneapolis in the U.S. state of Minnesota, that is centered at the intersection of Hennepin Avenue and West Lake Street. It has traditionally spanned the corners of four neighborhoods, Lowry Hill East, East Bde Maka Ska, South Uptown and East Isles neighborhoods, which are all within the Calhoun Isles community.

Uptown's borders have no official definition, though the neighborhood is generally centered on Lake Street and Hennepin Avenue. Historically, the boundaries of Uptown have been approximately Bde Maka Ska (formerly Lake Calhoun) to the west, Dupont Avenue to the east, 31st Street to the south, and 28th Street to the north. Other definitions extend north towards Franklin Avenue and east to Lyndale Avenue. Uptown is a popular destination for retail, nightlife, and cultural events, and the district was famously written about by recording artist and Minneapolis native Prince.

== History ==
The Lakes Area of Bde Maka Ska, Lake Harriet, and Lake of the Isles became popular in the 1880s as vacation cottages, hotels, and boating recreation became available by streetcar. As Minneapolis expanded south, housing construction boomed through the 1920s. A commercial district began forming just east of the Lakes Area. At the intersection of Hennepin Avenue and Lagoon Avenue, the Lagoon Theatre was built, a multi-function vaudeville theater. When the Lagoon burned in 1939, owners renovated it and the business community took the opportunity to rebrand the area. Following the success of Chicago's Uptown District, the Minneapolis Tribune announced the new Uptown District of Minneapolis centered on the newly renamed Uptown Theatre.

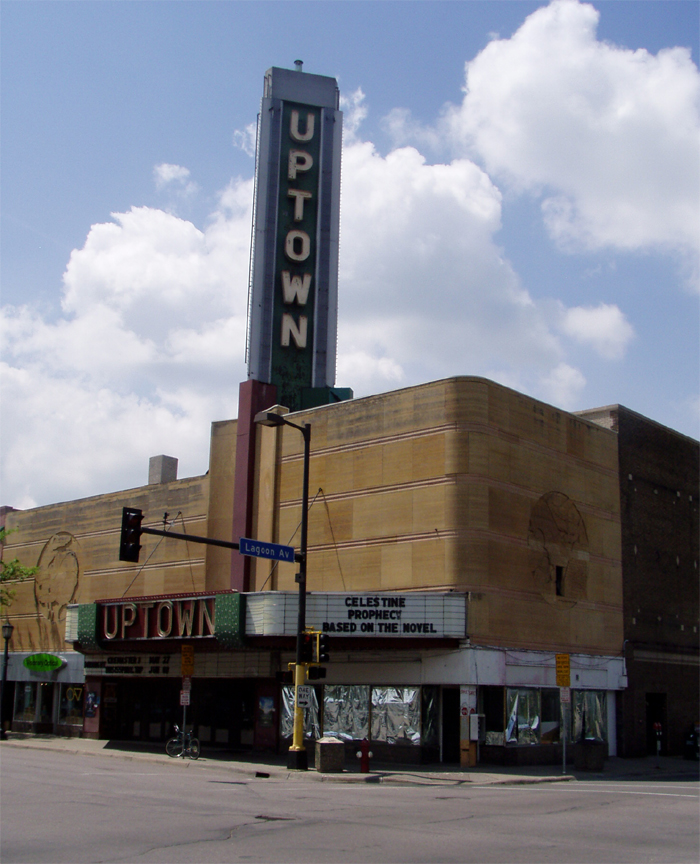
The Uptown Theater

Through the 20th century, Uptown was primarily a family area centered around nearby West High School at Hennepin and West 28th Street. Modest housing along Lowry Hill met the mansions of Kenwood to the west and around the lakes. Hennepin flourished as a commercial corridor and route from downtown to residential homes, while Uptown served also as an important streetcar route from Uptown to the vacation homes of Lake Minnetonka. White flight via the freeway system after World War II and closing of West High School in 1982 (razed in 1984) signaled a demographic shift in the area. Blight and crime began moving into Lowry Hill though were kept at bay by the Kenwood area. Neighborhood associations and formal borders were designated in the 1970s as each section of Uptown began addressing domestic problems.

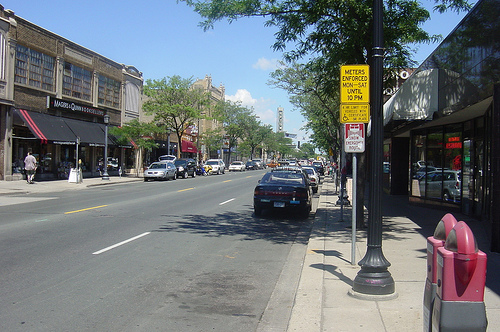
Hennepin Avenue just north of West 31st Street...

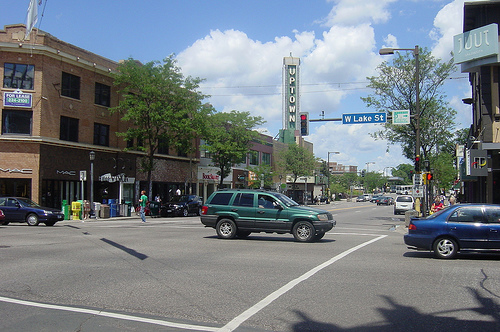
.. and a block north at West Lake Street.

During this time, Uptown developed an artist culture. The history of this culture is preserved in the annual Uptown Art Fair. In 1980, Minneapolis musician Prince released his seminal album Dirty Mind, which contained his paean to these artists, appropriately titled "Uptown". In 1993 he opened "New Power Generation," a retail store at 1408 West Lake Street, and in 1998 released "Calhoun Square," a song written in 1993, on his Crystal Ball album. A retail renaissance of the area occurred in the 1980s when Seven Points (formerly named Calhoun Square) was developed. Combining a half block of existing storefront buildings plus new construction, the renovation turned the area into a competitive retail draw from Downtown and from the suburban dales (malls). As the popularity of Uptown as a residential district grew again, the definition of the area expanded.

The Lake Street Council launched a Museum In the Streets project, a series of free, self-guided walking tours highlighting business districts along Lake Street, including Uptown. The Uptown Tour spotlights historic businesses and places in the neighborhood, including the origins of Abdallah Candies, Schlampp & Sons Furriers, and the Uptown Theater.

The neighborhood experienced civil unrest in the aftermath of the killing of Winston Boogie Smith by law enforcement officers on June 3, 2021. Smith, a 32-year-old black American man, allegedly fired a gun as they attempted to apprehend him in a parking ramp belonging to Seven Points near West Lake Street and Girard Avenue. Protests were held over subsequent weeks with demonstrators periodically occupying a street intersection and nearby vacant lot near where Smith was killed, until eventually said lot was fenced off. On the night of June 13, a demonstrator, Deona Knajdek, was killed when a vehicle rammed into a street demonstration.

As an informal neighborhood, Uptown has no official boundaries, and there are generational differences in its definition. The intersection of Hennepin Avenue and Lake Street is known as the heart of the district.

== Culture ==
Uptown is a mix of various cultural strains and is considered an area for young people to live and shop. It was formerly known as a vibrant center for artists and musicians, a center for Counterculture, and hippies, similar to East Village, Manhattan. The artist community was popularized by the musician Prince, who started his career in Uptown. The area has experienced gentrification, and is no longer considered the bohemian area it once was. Many of the older buildings and long-standing businesses in the area have closed or been torn down due to gentrification. But the area is still considered vibrant and walkable.

This area has a vast variety of ethnic food and grocery stores from Asian to Mexican to middle eastern. Uptown's more than 20 bars within a three-block radius draw people from across the metro area to revel in the district. Uptown seems to draw a "slightly older and 'more sophisticated'" clientele compared to the Warehouse District. Controversy about noise, particularly surrounding bar's rooftop patios. In 2011 City Council Member Meg Tuthill wrote a noise ordinance to address the issue, but it was afterwards withdrawn.

The area annually hosts the Uptown Art Fair, during the first full weekend of August. Local, national, and world artists converge to exhibit and sell fine art. Art media include paintings, sculptures, clothing, pottery, jewelry, glass, and mixed media.

== Economy ==
Uptown is renowned for its lively arts and entertainment options that feature many restaurants, stores, night clubs, bars, and theaters. In the 2000s, however, the neighborhoods surrounding Uptown have seen a surge in gentrification. This has caused an increase in property value and in property taxes.

== Transportation ==
The Uptown Transit Station is located on Hennepin Avenue over the 29th Street Greenway and serves Metro Transit buses 6, 12, 17, 21, 23, 53, 114 and 115. The station also has a change machine, a heated interior, binoculars, bike lockers and posts, and a workers lounge and office area. The Midtown Greenway, a former railway cutting which now hosts a bike path, bisects Uptown two blocks north of Lake Street adjacent to 29th Street.

== Notable residents ==
- Bob Stinson, musician
- Lyle Wright, businessman and hockey manager
