= Frank Hornstein =

American politician

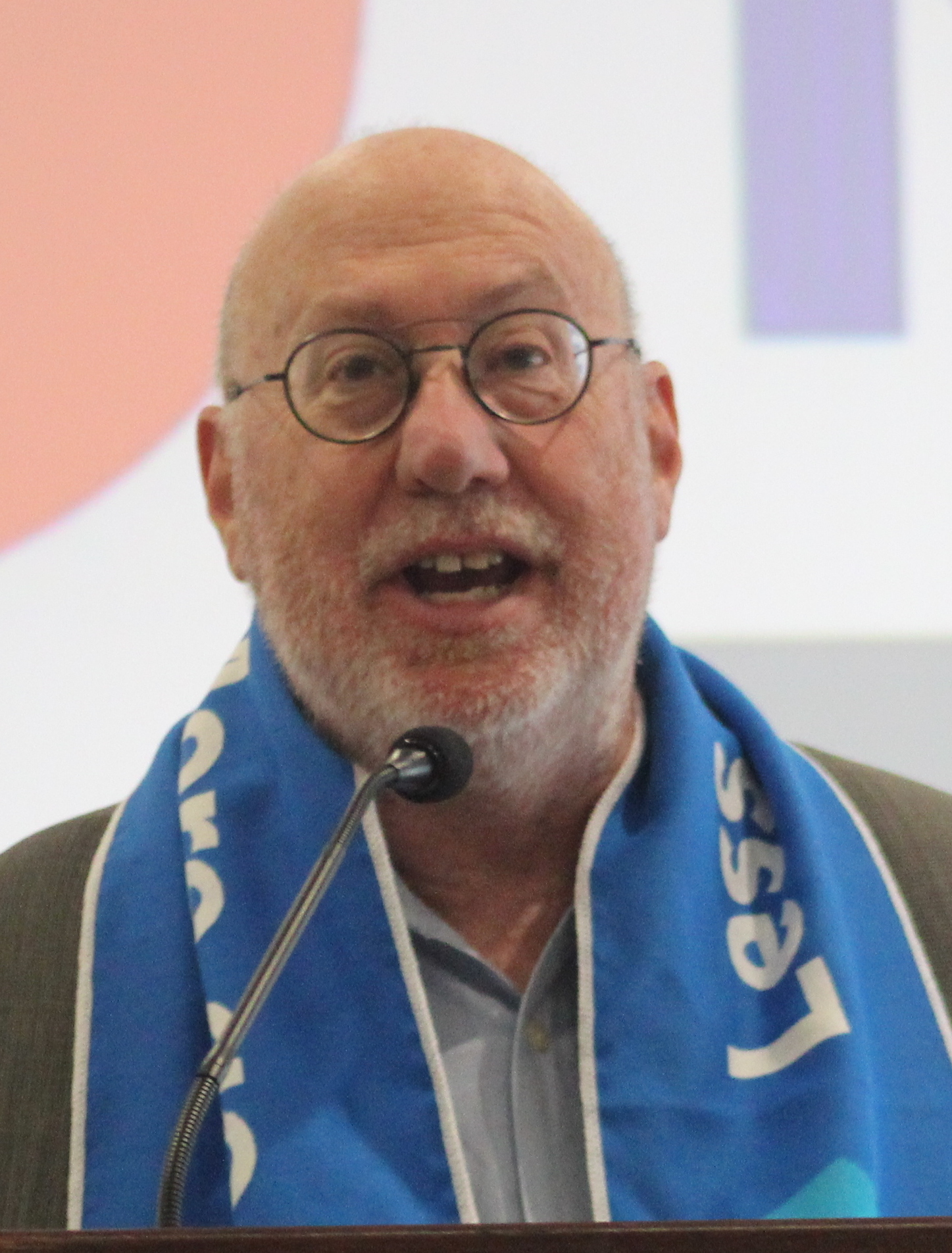

Member of the Minnesota House of Representatives from the 61A district
- In office January 7, 2003 – January 14, 2025
- Preceded by: redrawn district
- Succeeded by: Katie Jones

Personal details
- Born: September 27, 1959 (age 66) Cincinnati, Ohio
- Party: Democratic (DFL)
- Spouse: Marcia Zimmerman
- Children: 3
- Education: Macalester College (B.A.); Tufts University (M.A.)
- Occupation: Community organizer; College instructor; Legislator
- Website: Government website Campaign website

Frank Hornstein (born September 27, 1959) is an American politician who served in the Minnesota House of Representatives from 2003 to 2025. A member of the Minnesota Democratic–Farmer–Labor Party (DFL), Hornstein represented District 61A, which includes parts of the city of Minneapolis in Hennepin County, Minnesota.

== Early life, education and career ==
Hornstein was born in Cincinnati, Ohio, in 1959 to parents of Hungarian and Polish descent who survived the Holocaust in Germany. His grandmother died in the Auschwitz concentration camp.

Hornstein received his bachelor's degree in environmental studies from Macalester College. He earned a master's in urban and environmental policy from Tufts University, and attended graduate school at the University of Minnesota's Humphrey Institute.

Hornstein worked as a community organizer for COACT, a grassroots citizens' action group, Clean Water Action, and as a volunteer on Paul Wellstone's 1982 campaign for state auditor. He was appointed to the Twin Cities Metropolitan Council by Governor Jesse Ventura in 2000, serving until his election to the legislature. He has taught at Augsburg University.

== Minnesota House of Representatives ==
Hornstein was elected to the Minnesota House of Representatives in 2002 and was reelected every two years until 2022. After 2012 legislative redistricting, he was put into the same district as fellow legislator Marion Greene and both sought the DFL endorsement. At the convention, Greene conceded to Hornstein, who later endorsed her when she ran for Hennepin County Commissioner. In 2013, he endorsed city-council member Betsy Hodges in the Minneapolis mayoral election. Hornstein supported Bernie Sanders during the 2016 Democratic Party presidential primary and was a delegate for Sanders. He later endorsed Hillary Clinton after Sanders did the same.

Hornstein chaired the Transportation Finance and Policy Committee from 2019 to 2023. He also served on the Climate and Energy Finance and Policy, Sustainable Infrastructure Policy, and Ways and Means Committees. Hornstein chaired the Transportation and Transit Policy Committee from 2007 to 2010 and the Transportation Finance Committee from 2013 to 2014.

In February 2024, Hornstein announced he would not seek reelection after serving 11 terms in the Minnesota House. In an interview after his announcement, he said: "It is time to pass the torch. I've been here 22 years. You can't do something forever." Hornstein endorsed Katie Jones, a climate policy analyst, in the days before the DFL primary election for his seat. Jones won the primary and general election.

=== Transportation ===
As transportation chair, Hornstein advocated for increasing transit funding for rapid bus lines, increasing passenger rail services between the Twin Cities and St. Cloud, Duluth, and Chicago, transportation services for the disabled, and increased funding for roads and bridges. He said the state needed to look at transportation "through an equity lens, a racial justice lens... and through a climate lens".

Hornstein long supported issuing driver's licenses regardless of immigration status. He supported increasing the state gas tax and the sales tax in the Twin Cities to pay for transit improvements. Hornstein pushed for stricter speed limits on city streets to protect pedestrians and bicyclers, increasing the use of electric buses, and reducing the number of drivers on roads. He authored legislation to leverage federal infrastructure dollars for projects in Minnesota.

==== Distracted driving legislation ====
Hornstein authored legislation that made it illegal to text while driving, and bills to raise fines for drivers repeatedly caught texting and driving. He also authored bills to make it illegal to use a cellphone while driving without a hands-free device, which faced opposition from House Republicans. At the time, distracted driving was the cause of 25 percent of crashes and 20 percent of motor vehicle fatalities. The bill was reintroduced under DFL control, passed the House with bipartisan support, and was signed by Governor Tim Walz in April 2018.

==== Railroad regulation ====
Hornstein advocated for greater regulation of railroads, especially oil trains, and authored amendments and bills requiring companies to share the cost of rail line upgrades. He opposed legislation to absolve companies of liability in case of accidents, pushed for a law requiring a study of the industry, and later authored bipartisan legislation to fix the issues found. He supported guidance from the National Transportation Safety Board that recommends hazardous oil cargo be routed away from population centers, and criticized the Trump administration for rolling back regulations.

==== Light rail and bus rapid transit ====
Hornstein, who regularly uses the Twin Cities light rail system, opposed cuts to the system, and supported legislation to change fare-dodging from a criminal to a civil penalty. He raised concern over running freight trains through light-rail corridors. He supported increasing bus-rapid-transit projects, including the Orange Line, which would run from downtown Minneapolis to Burnsville.

==== Metropolitan Council ====
Hornstein supported reforms to the Metropolitan Council, a regional governmental agency and metropolitan planning organization, including instituting direct elections for members instead of gubernatorial appointment. He criticized the council for lacking transparency, public input, and adequate environmental reviews, for cost overruns, and for its handling of the Southwest Light Rail project; he supported audits of the council's performance and legislation to transfer the project to the Minnesota Department of Transportation.

=== Other policy positions ===
Hornstein opposed privatization of government services and growing corporate money influence in politics. He introduced legislation to raise the minimum wage in the Twin Cities metropolitan area, and supports a $15 an hour minimum wage. He opposed state funding for sports stadiums. He supported legislation that would ban the sale of semi-automatic assault rifles.

Hornstein criticized the Trump administration's attempts to end the DACA program for young immigrants. He visited the Texas border in 2018 and spoke out against the administration's family separation policy. Hornstein was part of a bipartisan delegation to Cuba in 2015, and said that he supported future economic ties with the country. In 2009, he led a bipartisan delegation to Israel, and traveled to Germany to explore green energy and jobs policy.

==== Hate crime legislation ====
Hornstein has spoken out against increasing hate crimes against Jewish, Muslim, Asian, and LGBTQ Americans, and authored legislation that would require the Attorney General's office to review hate-crime laws. The legislation failed to advance in the Republican-controlled Senate. He also authored legislation requiring increased training for police in dealing with bias-motivated crimes, and allowing community groups to file hate crime reports. He authored legislation to require Holocaust and genocide education in middle and high school education. In 2007, he spoke out on the House floor against legislators who likened a smoking ban to Nazism and criticized gubernatorial candidate Scott Jensen for likening COVID-19 public health measures to Nazi Germany.

==== Climate and the environment ====
Hornstein authored legislation in the House likened to the Green New Deal. He has supported legislation to set 100 percent renewable energy goals in the state, and bills to increase recycling goals in the metro area. Hornstein has called for oil refineries to stop using hydrogen fluoride, calling it unsafe, and criticized the Enbridge Line 4 pipeline. He attended the 2021 United Nations Climate Summit in Glasgow, Scotland.

== Electoral history ==
2002 Minnesota State House - District 60B
Party	Candidate	Votes	%
Democratic (DFL)	Frank Hornstein	15,194	97.90
Write-in		326	2.10
Total votes		15,520	100.0
Democratic (DFL) hold			

2004 Minnesota State House - District 60B
Party	Candidate	Votes	%
Democratic (DFL)	Frank Hornstein (incumbent)	18,281	78.78
Republican	Jeremy J. Estenson	4,887	21.06
Write-in		38	0.16
Total votes		23,206	100.0
Democratic (DFL) hold			

2006 Minnesota State House - District 60B
Party	Candidate	Votes	%
Democratic (DFL)	Frank Hornstein (incumbent)	15,867	81.84
Republican	Skyler Weinand	3,474	17.92
Write-in		47	0.24
Total votes		19,388	100.0
Democratic (DFL) hold			

2008 Minnesota State House - District 60B
Party	Candidate	Votes	%
Democratic (DFL)	Frank Hornstein (incumbent)	18,868	80.80
Republican	Adam Martin	4,418	18.92
Write-in		66	0.28
Total votes		23,352	100.0
Democratic (DFL) hold			

2010 Minnesota State House - District 60B
Party	Candidate	Votes	%
Democratic (DFL)	Frank Hornstein (incumbent)	14,707	80.41
Republican	Scott Brooks	3,557	19.45
Write-in		27	0.15
Total votes		18,291	100.0
Democratic (DFL) hold			

2012 Minnesota State House - District 61A
Party	Candidate	Votes	%
Democratic (DFL)	Frank Hornstein (incumbent)	19,663	80.22
Republican	Devin Gawnemark	4,787	19.53
Write-in		61	0.25
Total votes		24,511	100.0
Democratic (DFL) hold			

2014 Minnesota State House - District 61A
Party	Candidate	Votes	%
Democratic (DFL)	Frank Hornstein (incumbent)	14,239	80.79
Republican	Frank Taylor	3,341	18.96
Write-in		45	0.26
Total votes		17,625	100.0
Democratic (DFL) hold			

2016 Minnesota State House - District 61A
Party	Candidate	Votes	%
Democratic (DFL)	Frank Hornstein (incumbent)	21,656	79.16
Republican	Brian Rosenblatt	5,615	20.53
Write-in		85	0.31
Total votes		27,356	100.0
Democratic (DFL) hold			

2018 Minnesota State House - District 61A
Party	Candidate	Votes	%
Democratic (DFL)	Frank Hornstein (incumbent)	23,736	86.05
Republican	Jeremy Hansen	3,814	13.83
Write-in		35	0.13
Total votes		27,585	100.0
Democratic (DFL) hold			

2020 Minnesota State House - District 61A
Party	Candidate	Votes	%
Democratic (DFL)	Frank Hornstein (incumbent)	25,755	84.41
Republican	Kurtis Fechtmeyer	4,724	15.48
Write-in		34	0.11
Total votes		30,513	100.0
Democratic (DFL) hold			

2022 Minnesota State House - District 61A
Party	Candidate	Votes	%
Democratic (DFL)	Frank Hornstein (incumbent)	15,848	98.80
Write-in		193	1.20
Total votes		16,041	100.0
Democratic (DFL) hold			

== Personal life ==
Hornstein is Jewish. He is married to Marcia Zimmerman, chief rabbi at Temple Israel in Minneapolis.
