= The Wedge, Minneapolis =

Coordinates: 44.9550°N 93.2913°W

The Wedge
- Neighborhood
- Lowry Hill East
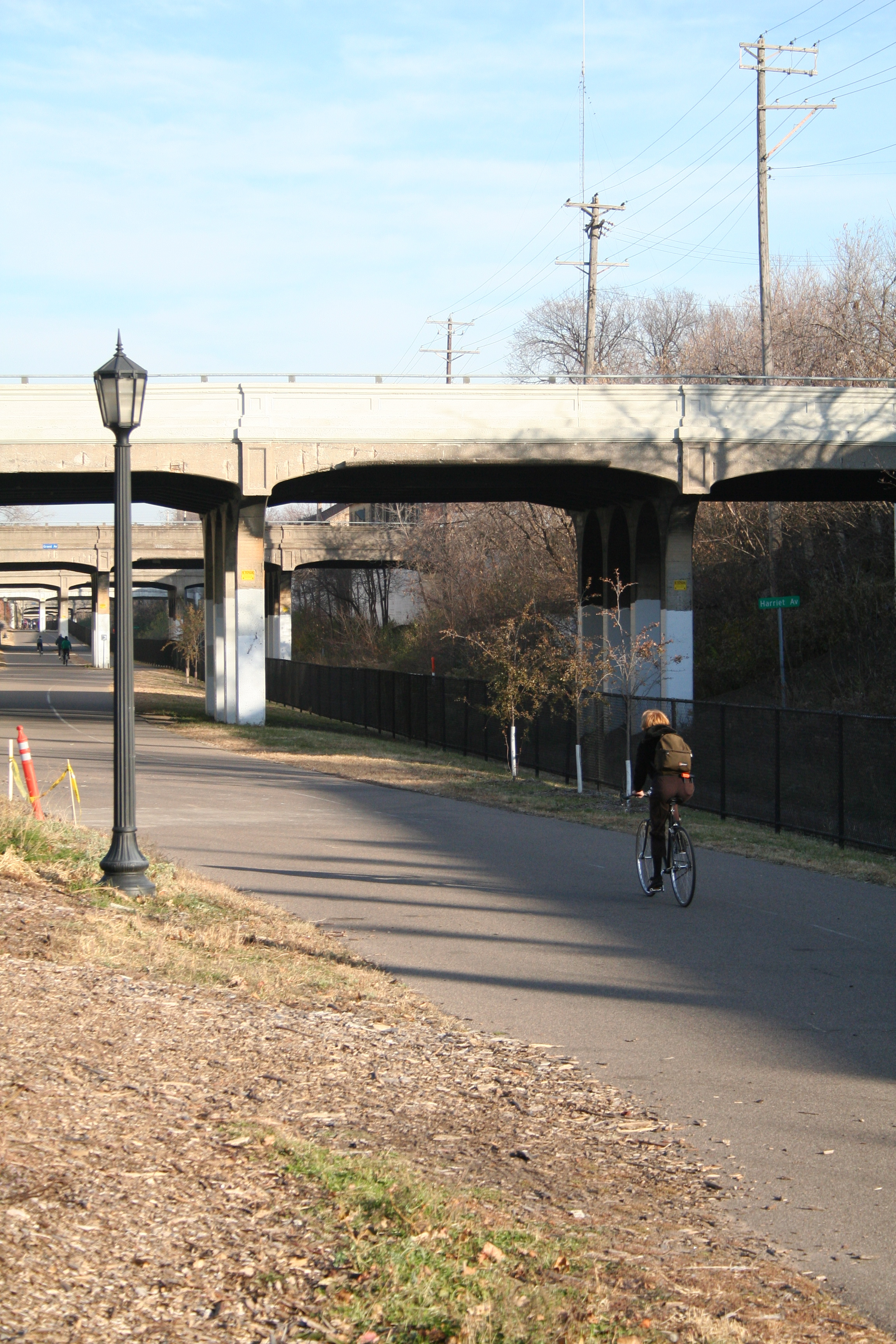
- Midtown Greenway

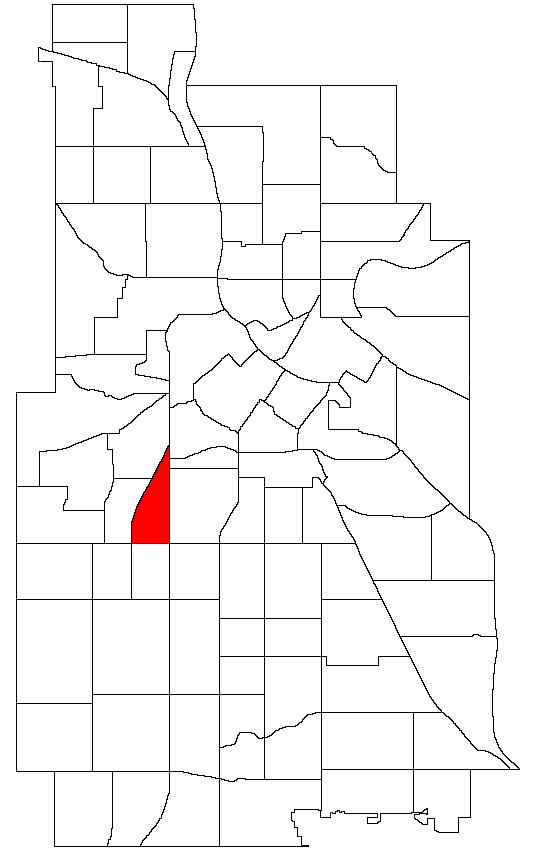
- Location of Lowry Hill East within the U.S. city of Minneapolis
- Interactive map of The Wedge
- Country: United States
- State: Minnesota
- County: Hennepin
- City: Minneapolis
- Community: Bde Maka Ska-Isles
- City Council Ward: 10

Government
  - Council Member: Aisha Chughtai

Area
  - Total: 0.411 sq mi (1.06 km^{2})

Population (2020)
  - Total: 9,298
  - Density: 22,600/sq mi (8,730/km^{2})
- Time zone: UTC-6 (CST)
  - Summer (DST): UTC-5 (CDT)
- ZIP code: 55403, 55405, 55408
- Area code: 612
- Website: thewedge.org

Historical population
Census	Pop.	Note	%±
1980	6,187		—
1990	5,933		−4.1%
2000	5,912		−0.4%
2010	6,150		4.0%
2020	9,298		51.2%

The Wedge, officially Lowry Hill East, is a neighborhood in southwest Minneapolis, Minnesota, United States, part of the Bde Maka Ska-Isles community. It is bounded on the east by Lyndale Avenue, on the west by Hennepin Avenue and on the south by Lake Street. Lyndale and Hennepin intersect on the northern side at Interstate 94. This creates a neighborhood in a roughly triangular shape.

The Wedge developed in the 1880s along a horse-drawn streetcar line built by Thomas Lowry. The interior of the neighborhood is residential, with large early 20th century homes and multi-unit apartment buildings, while the border streets are lined with bars, restaurants, grocery stores, coffeeshops, and other small businesses. Most housing is renter-occupied.

== Demographics ==
In 2020, the population of the neighborhood was 9,298. The neighborhood was 67.9% White, 14.0% Black or African American, 8.4% Asian or Pacific Islander, 5.1% Hispanic or Latino of any race and 3.1% two or more races. It had a much higher percentage of single residents than other neighborhoods in Minneapolis, a higher percentage of renters, and a lower percentage of families with children. The median household income was $57,802.

Race/ethnicity
Race/ethnicity	2000		2010		2020	
Race/ethnicity	Number	%	Number	%	Number	%
White alone	4,919	83.20	5,136	83.51	6,621	75.66
Black alone	391	6.61	270	4.39	540	6.17
Hispanic or Latino (any race)	217	3.67	250	4.07	584	6.67
Native American alone	59	1.00	38	0.62	43	0.49
Asian alone	154	2.60	250	4.07	436	4.98
Other race alone	17	0.29	11	0.18	43	0.49
Pacific Islander alone	6	0.10	6	0.10	6	0.07
Two or more races	149	2.52	190	3.09	478	5.46
Total	5,912	100.0	6,150	100.0	8,751	100.0

== Location and infrastructure ==
The Wedge is part of Ward 10 of the Minneapolis City Council. It is bordered by Loring Park and Stevens Square to the northeast, Whittier to the east, Lyndale to the southeast, South Uptown to the south, East Bde Maka Ska to the southwest, East Isles to the west, and Lowry Hill to the northwest.

It is part of a larger area south of Franklin Avenue and west of Nicollet Avenue that is often considered Uptown, although some define Uptown as a smaller area centered on the intersection of Hennepin and Lake or generally west of Dupont Avenue.

The Wedge is one of the city's denser neighborhoods, accessible by a diverse range of transit options. Several major Metro Transit bus lines run through and around the neighborhood's boundaries, centered on the Uptown Transit Center on Hennepin Avenue. Multiple bicycle paths and protected lanes, including the Midtown Greenway, run through the neighborhood.

== Culture ==
The Wedge is the location of an annual "cat tour," which regularly draws hundreds of people to look at window cats in the Wedge. A tour inspired by the Wedge's has been hosted in Hamline-Midway, Saint Paul since 2025. The neighborhood has been noted for a density of ice cream shops.
