= Lowry Hill, Minneapolis =

Coordinates: 44.9689°N 93.2919°W

Lowry Hill
- Neighborhood
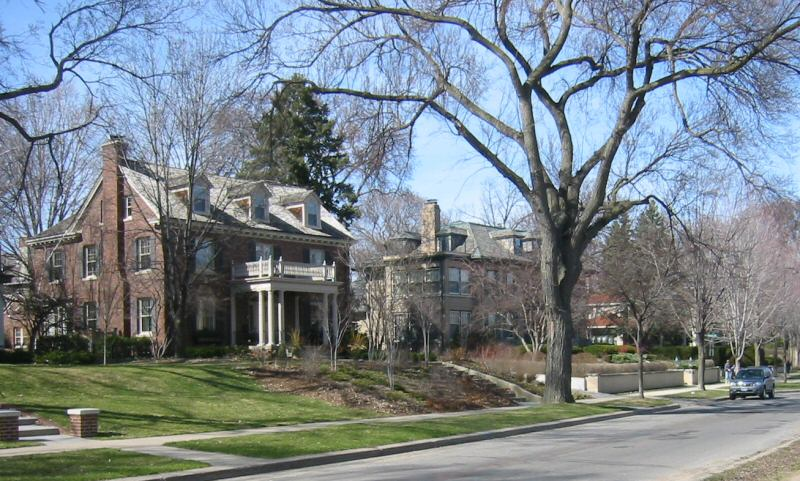
- Lowry Hill homes along the northern tip of Lake of the Isles
- Motto: In Omnibus Caritas
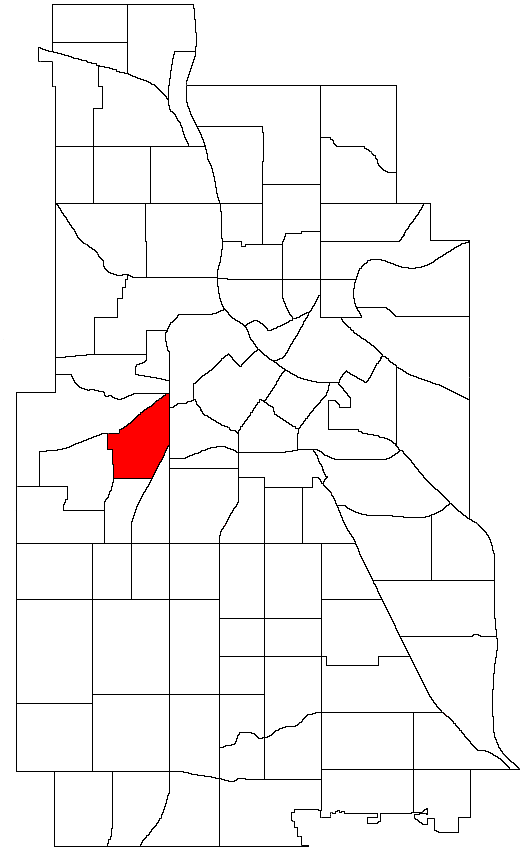
- Location of Lowry Hill within the U.S. city of Minneapolis
- Interactive map of Lowry Hill
- Country: United States
- State: Minnesota
- County: Hennepin
- City: Minneapolis
- Community: Bde Maka Ska-Isles
- Settled: 1846
- City Council Ward: 7

Government
  - Council Member: Elizabeth Shaffer

Area
  - Total: 0.622 sq mi (1.61 km^{2})

Population (2020)
  - Total: 3,877
  - Density: 6,230/sq mi (2,410/km^{2})
- Time zone: UTC-6 (CST)
  - Summer (DST): UTC-5 (CDT)
- ZIP code: 55403, 55405
- Area code: 612

Historical population
Census	Pop.	Note	%±
1980	3,964		—
1990	3,792		−4.3%
2000	3,999		5.5%
2010	3,760		−6.0%
2020	3,877		3.1%

Lowry Hill is a neighborhood within the Bde Maka Ska-Isles community in Minneapolis, Minnesota. The neighborhood is regarded as being one of the city’s most upscale and wealthy neighborhoods. It was historically the home of Minneapolis’s most prominent milling and lumber families.

Although secluded by trees and parkways up on the hill, its boundaries are Interstate 394 to the north, Interstate 94 to the east, Hennepin Avenue to the southeast, West 22nd Street to the south, Lake of the Isles Parkway to the southwest, and Logan Avenue South and Morgan Avenue South to the west. Lowry Hill is northwest of Lowry Hill East; the two neighborhoods are separated by Hennepin Avenue.

Lowry Hill is part of Ward 7 in the Minneapolis City Council and state legislative district 61A.

== History ==
The neighborhood is named for the terminal moraine on which it sits, a hill named after late nineteenth century real estate mogul and trolley tycoon Thomas Lowry. The hill was described as swampy and covered in a thick old-growth forest during Minneapolis’s early years. The hill eventually became a small farming area overlooking Minneapolis in the mid 1800s.

Many houses in Lowry Hill were built in the Victorian style before 1900. However, the Colonial, Mediterranean, English Tudor, Richardsonian Romanesque, Rambler, and Prairie style make appearances as well. A majority of those homes were constructed shortly after the neighborhood's establishment as a preferred residential area for many of the wealthiest of Minneapolis' citizens. In over 100 years, the look of Lowry Hill has remained almost unchanged, however, some of the large homes built by original owners have been converted to condominia.

== Demographics ==
Race/ethnicity
Race/ethnicity	2000		2010		2020	
Race/ethnicity	Number	%	Number	%	Number	%
White alone	3,684	92.12	3,327	89.12	3,195	83.05
Black alone	93	2.33	106	2.84	149	3.87
Hispanic or Latino (any race)	71	1.78	102	2.73	146	3.80
Native American alone	4	0.10	14	0.38	12	0.32
Asian alone	77	1.93	110	2.95	128	3.33
Other race alone	4	0.10	8	0.21	26	0.68
Pacific Islander alone	1	0.03	2	0.05	0	0.00
Two or more races	65	1.63	64	1.71	191	4.96
Total	3,999	100.0	3,733	100.0	3,847	100.0

== See also ==
- Lowry Hill Tunnel
- Virginia Triangle
