= Kenwood, Minneapolis =

Coordinates: 44.9590°N 93.3119°W

Kenwood
- Neighborhood
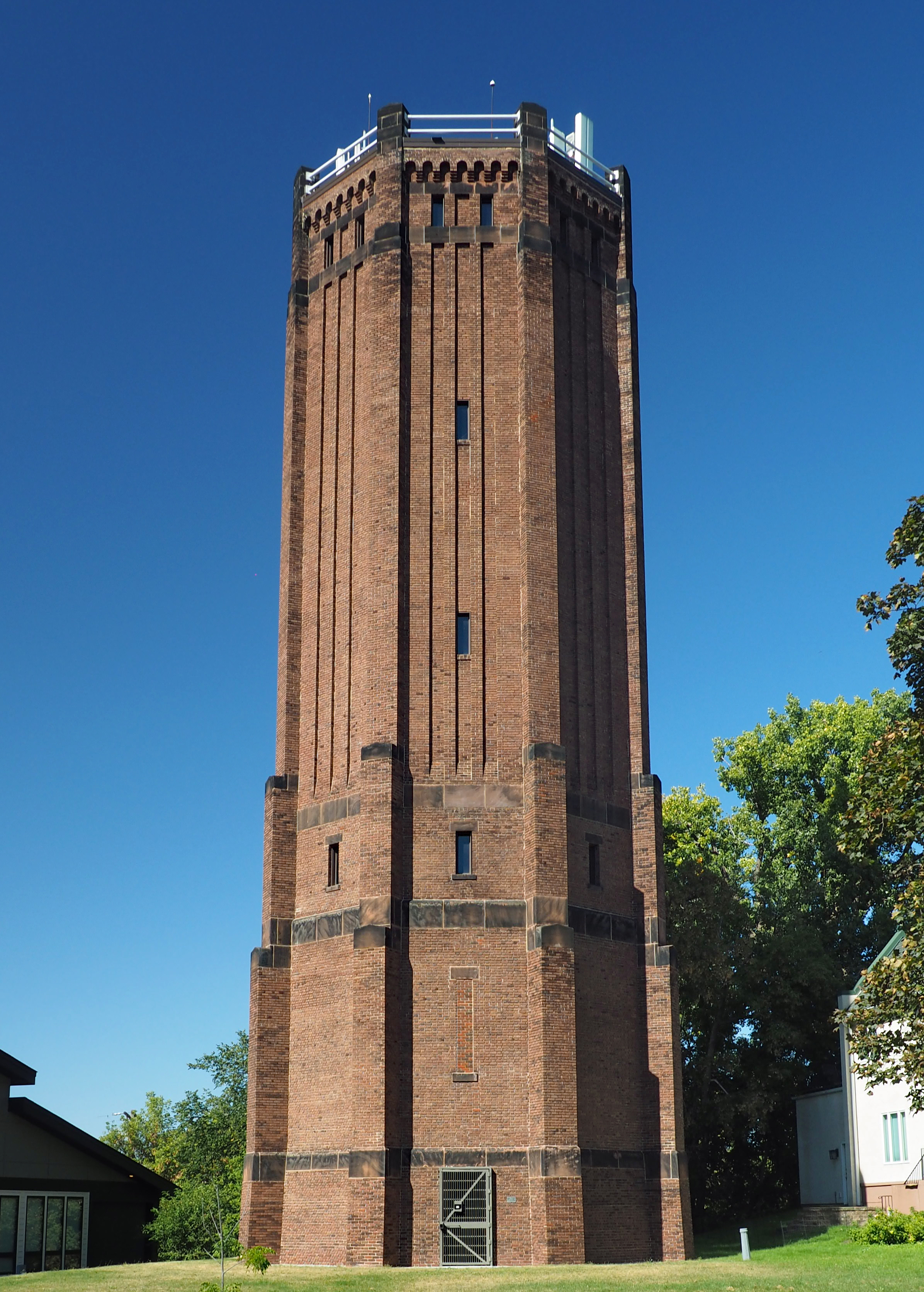
- The 1910 Kenwood Park Water Tower in Kenwood

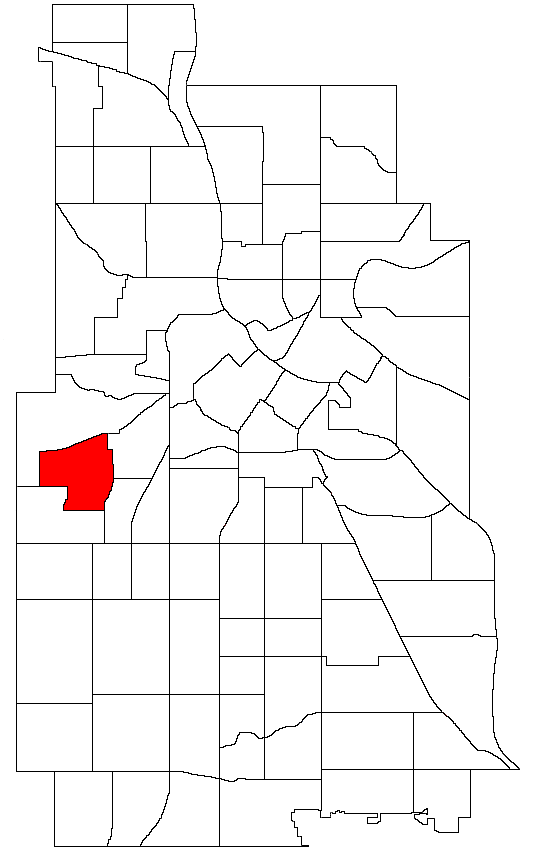
- Location of Kenwood within the U.S. city of Minneapolis
- Interactive map of Kenwood
- Country: United States
- State: Minnesota
- County: Hennepin
- City: Minneapolis
- Community: Bde Maka Ska-Isles
- Founded: late 1880s
- City Council ward: 7

Government
  - Council Member: Elizabeth Shaffer

Area
  - Total: 0.637 sq mi (1.65 km^{2})

Population (2020)
  - Total: 1,064
  - Density: 1,670/sq mi (645/km^{2})
- Time zone: UTC-6 (CST)
  - Summer (DST): UTC-5 (CDT)
- ZIP code: 55403, 55405
- Area code: 612

Historical population
Census	Pop.	Note	%±
1980	1,963		—
1990	1,817		−7.4%
2000	1,501		−17.4%
2010	1,414		−5.8%
2020	1,064		−24.8%

Kenwood is a neighborhood within the Bde Maka Ska-Isles community in Minneapolis along Lake of the Isles and Cedar Lake. The neighborhood is one of the most affluent in the city along with the nearby Lowry Hill neighborhood. The Kenwood neighborhood's most notable feature is the many historic mansions along the parkways overlooking the lake and the downtown skyline.

The neighborhood was established in the late 1880s, when a rail line running along Cedar Lake to the west of the neighborhood provided increased access.

Its boundaries are Cedar Lake Parkway to the west, Kenwood Parkway to the north, West Lake of the Isles Parkway to the east, and Kenilworth Place to the south. It is in ward 7 of the Minneapolis City Council and state legislative district 61A.

== Demographics ==
Race/ethnicity
Race/ethnicity	2000		2010		2020	
Race/ethnicity	Number	%	Number	%	Number	%
White alone	1,403	92.91	1,333	90.80	1,228	85.46
Black alone	22	1.46	14	0.95	21	1.46
Hispanic or Latino (any race)	26	1.72	44	3.00	34	2.37
Native American alone	4	0.26	10	0.68	4	0.28
Asian alone	40	2.65	33	2.25	42	2.92
Other race alone	0	0.00	0	0.00	15	1.01
Pacific Islander alone	0	0.00	0	0.00	0	0.00
Two or more races	15	0.99	34	2.32	93	6.47
Total	1,510	100.0	1,468	100.0	1,437	100.0

== Notable residents ==
- Kenwood's most famous fictional resident was Mary Richards, played by Mary Tyler Moore, who resided at fictional "119 North Weatherly" and used exterior shots of the home located at 2104 Kenwood Parkway from 1970 to 1975 during the first five seasons of The Mary Tyler Moore Show.
- Walter Mondale, Vice President of the United States, was a long time resident near Fremont Avenue.

- Emery Mapes, one of the founders of Cream of Wheat, resided in Kenwood.
