= Lake of the Isles =

Lake in Minnesota, U.S.

- Wíta Tópa (Dakota)
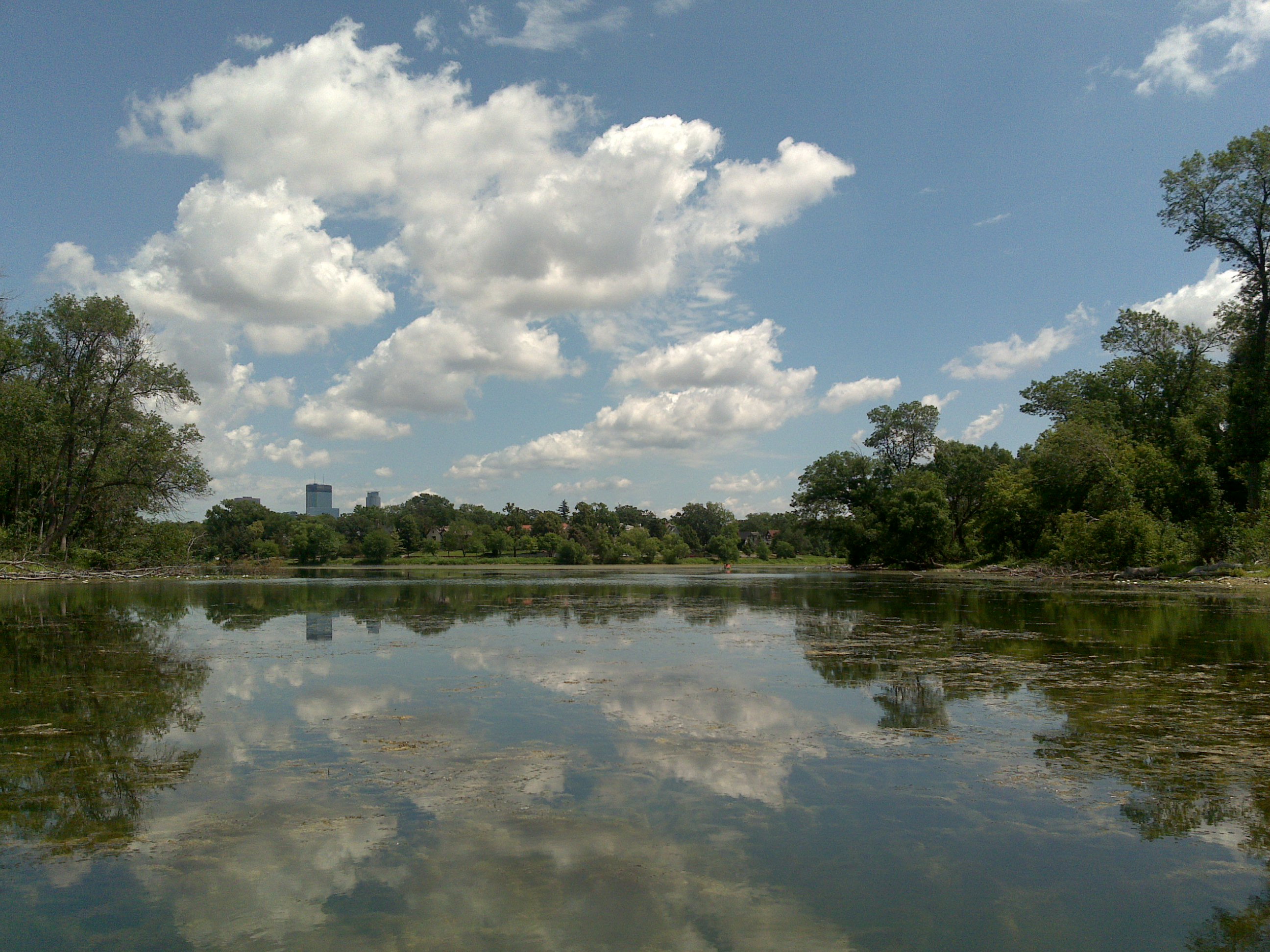
- The lake seen from the south in July, with birdlife sanctuary islands on the left and right
- Interactive map of Lake of the Isles
- Location: Minneapolis, Minnesota
- Coordinates: 44°57′17″N 93°18′27″W
- Basin countries: United States
- Surface area: 109 acres (44 ha)
- Max. depth: 31 feet (9 m)
- Islands: 2 (Mike's Island, Raspberry Island)

Lake of the Isles is a lake in Minneapolis, Minnesota, connected to Cedar Lake and Bde Maka Ska. The lake is part of the city's Chain of Lakes and has an area of 109 acres (0.4 km^{2}), 2.86 miles (4.6 km) of shoreline with a little under three miles of paved walking and biking paths, and a maximum depth of 31 feet (9 m). Lake of the Isles is known for its two wooded islands, its long north arm, and the surrounding stately houses of the Kenwood, Lowry Hill, and East Isles neighborhoods.

== History ==
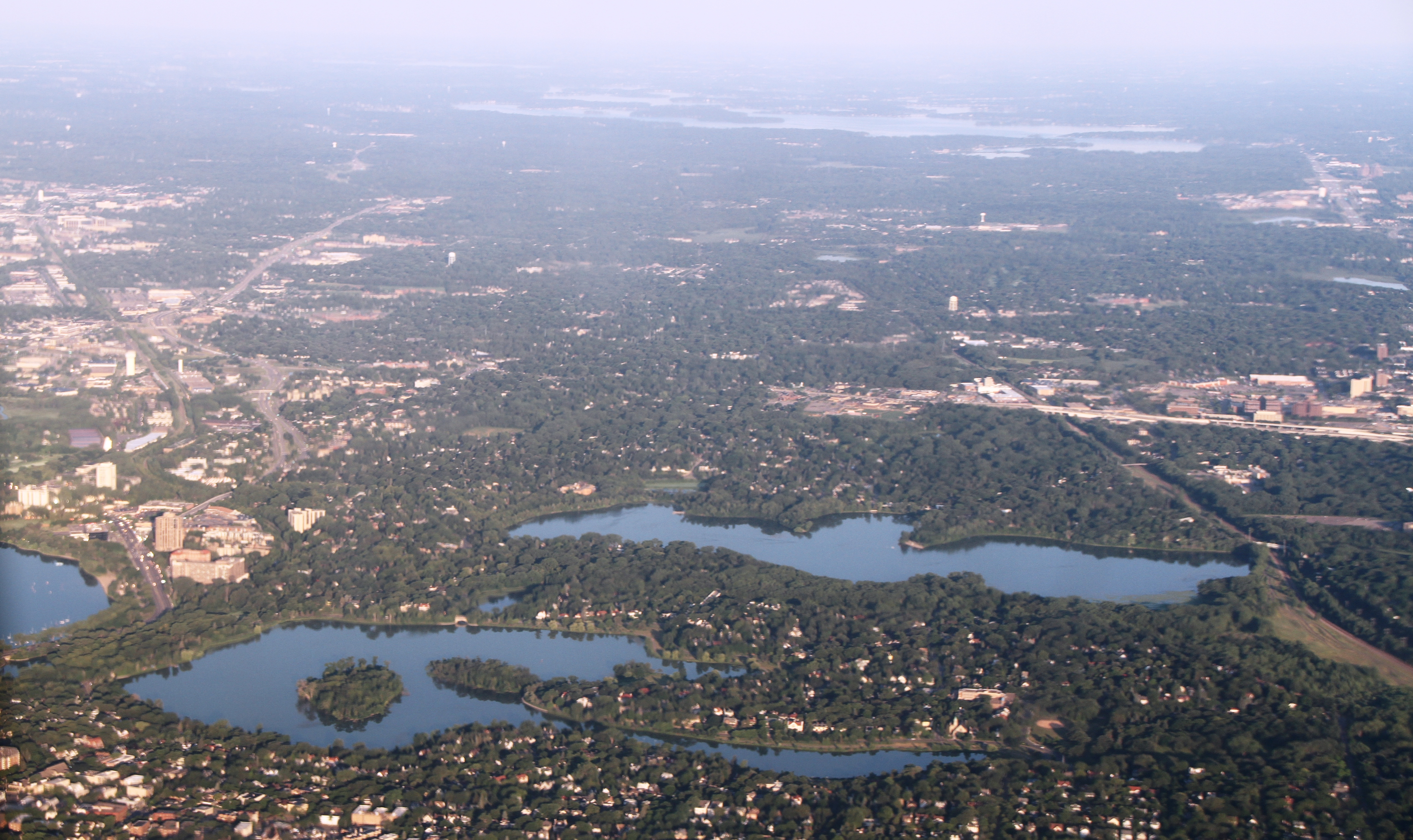
Aerial view of Lake of the Isles (bottom) and Cedar Lake (top middle) from the east

The lake was named for small islands that used to exist in the lake, wetlands area, and was used from the earliest days of European settlement of Minneapolis. Dakota people, the inhabitants prior to Europeans, referred to those islands as Wíta Tópa (Four Islands). The lake, named "Lake of the Isles" appears in an 1835 map of the Fort Snelling area. At one time the lake contained four small islands, but two of them, near the south shore of the lake, were converted to parkland as the lake was developed and dredged to its current shape and size. The two remaining wooded islands, Mike's Island in the north and Raspberry Island, are protected wildlife refuges which contain virgin woods. Landing on either of the islands is prohibited, as marked by signs.

The lake was created in its current form in the 1880s by dredging a small lake, called Wíta Tópa ("four islands lake") by the local Dakota people, and an adjacent marsh. The dredged materials—mostly peat and silt—were used to create about 36 acres (150,000 m^{2}) of parkland around the lake. The settling of these materials and the pressure of urban development led to an unstable shoreline and reduced water quality. The Minneapolis Park and Recreation Board is engaged in a multiyear project to stabilize the shoreline, renovate the parkland, and construct twelve stone points of access to the lake. In winter it is used for ice skating and hockey and serves as the location of a New Year's Eve celebration featuring roasted marshmallows and hot chocolate.

== Fish ==
The lake contains black bullhead, black crappie, bluegill, bowfin, common carp, hybrid sunfish, largemouth bass, northern pike, pumpkinseed, tiger muskellunge, walleye, yellow bullhead, and yellow perch. Some guideline restrictions have been placed on the consumption of bluegill, carp, crappie, largemouth bass, northern pike, walleye, white sucker, and yellow perch from the lake, because of contamination with mercury and PFOS.

== In popular culture ==
Prince mentions Lake of the Isles in the song "Rock n Roll Is Alive (And It Lives in Minneapolis)" with the lyric, "Sure as the drive around Lake of the Isles is cool I know, Rock 'n' roll will never die, like the Minnehaha flow."

A number of shots in the opening to the Mary Tyler Moore Show and the 1982 film The Personals were shot around Lake of the Isles.

== See also ==
- Loti Pencil
- List of lakes in Minneapolis
- List of shared-use paths in Minneapolis
