= Aisha Chughtai =

American community organizer (born 1997)

Aisha Siddida Chughtai
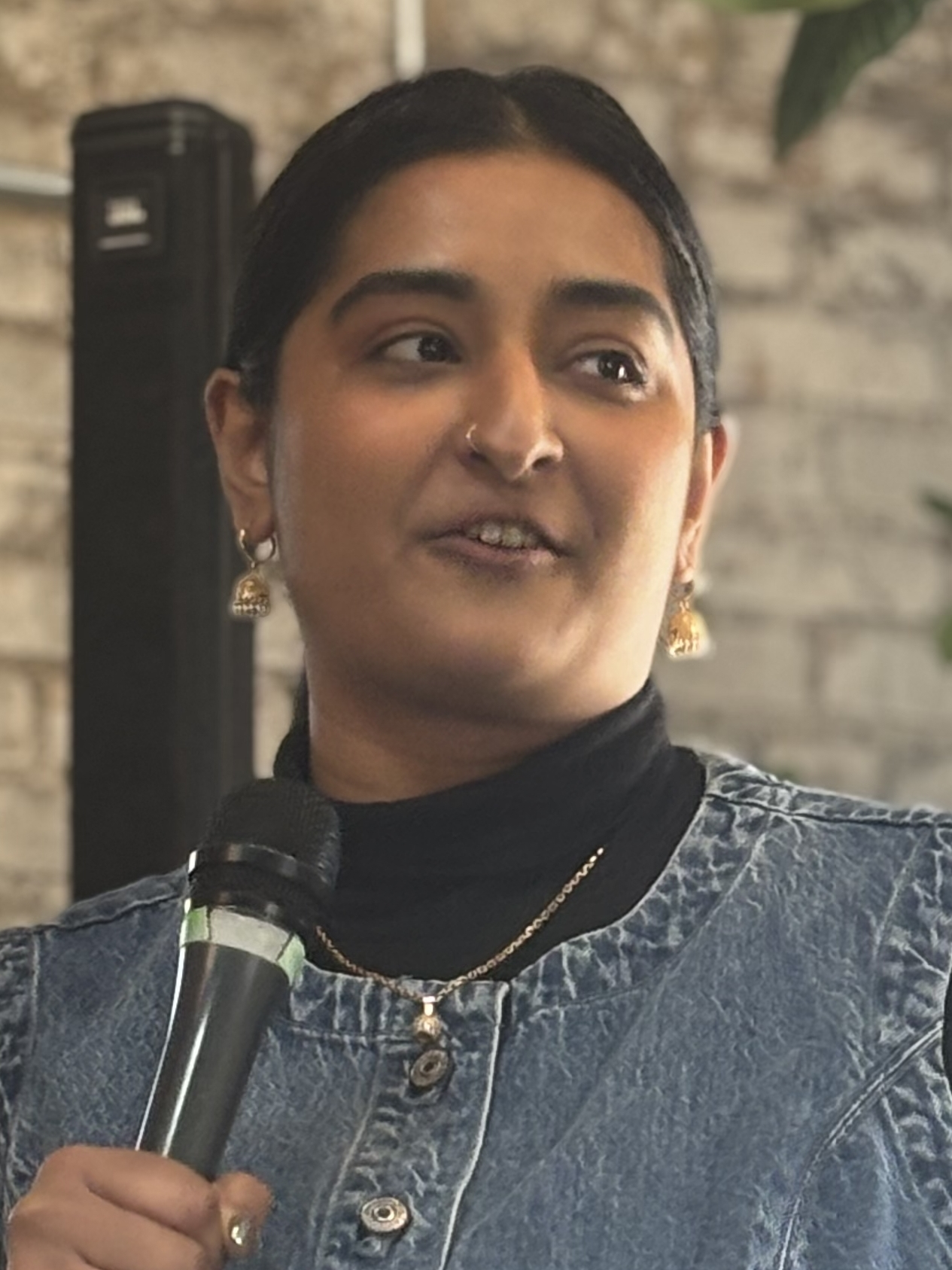
- Chughtai in 2025

Vice President of the Minneapolis City Council
- In office January 8, 2024 – January 6, 2026
- President: Elliott Payne
- Preceded by: Linea Palmisano
- Succeeded by: Jamal Osman

Member of the Minneapolis City Council from Ward 10
- Incumbent
- Assumed office January 3, 2022
- Preceded by: Lisa Bender

Majority leader of the Minneapolis City Council
- Preceded by: New office

Personal details
- Born: September 4, 1997 (age 29)
- Party: Democratic (DFL)
- Other political affiliations: Democratic Socialists of America
- Website: Campaign website

Aisha Siddida Chughtai (born September 4, 1997) is an American community organizer and politician serving on the Minneapolis City Council, representing the 10th Ward. Chughtai was the council's vice president from 2024 to 2026. A member of the Minnesota Democratic–Farmer–Labor Party (DFL), she was elected in 2021 to succeed retiring Council President Lisa Bender. She is the youngest person, and first Muslim woman, elected to the Council. She is a member of the Twin Cities Democratic Socialists of America (DSA).

== Early life and career ==
Chughtai's parents are immigrants from Pakistan; her father worked as a mechanic and her mother as a Quranic instructor. She grew up in Houston, where her family experienced housing instability, and moved to Mankato, Minnesota during the 2008 financial crisis.

Chughtai has worked on numerous political campaigns, including as campaign manager of U.S. Representative Ilhan Omar's 2018 campaign. She later worked as a political organizer for the SEIU Minnesota State Council.

Chughtai was elected to the city council in 2021. In 2022, she served on the Business, Inspections, Housing & Zoning and Public Works & Infrastructure Committees. In 2023, she was appointed Council Vice President alongside Council President Elliott Payne.

In 2026, Chughtai stepped down as council vice president, backing Jamal Osman as a successor, and took on the new role of majority leader. She sits on seven of the council's eight committees, chairs the Budget Committee, and is vice chair of the Committee of the Whole.

== Views and initiatives ==
Chughtai advocates for community control over the police, saying that democratizing control over the MPD would lead to more appropriate ward-by-ward safety solutions.

She advocated for a 24-hour bus lane on Hennepin Avenue, which Mayor Jacob Frey vetoed. She has also said she believes that installing protected bike lanes is important to promoting public safety.

Chughtai advocates for rent control tied to inflation, vacancy control, and stronger protections for renters.

Chughtai prioritizes making the city more climate-resilient and ecologically friendly by promoting infrastructure projects such as warming/cooling accommodations and public transportation. In December 2025, she advocated for a ban on robotaxis.

== Electoral history ==
=== 2021 Minneapolis City Council election ===
In 2021, Chughtai announced her candidacy for retiring Council President Lisa Bender's Ward 10 seat. Her campaign focused on expanding affordable housing and strengthening local labor laws. The DFL did not issue an endorsement in the ward, as no candidate achieved the necessary vote threshold. She was endorsed by the abortion rights organization #VOTEPROCHOICE.

Chughtai won the instant-runoff election on November 3 with 50.3% of the vote to her nearest challenger's 33.6%. She took office on January 3, 2022, becoming the first Asian American, Muslim woman, and youngest member of the Council. She took the oath of office on a ceremonial Quran also used by Ilhan Omar, Keith Ellison, Omar Fateh, and numerous other Muslim officials elected in Minneapolis.

=== 2023 Minneapolis City Council election ===
On November 7, 2023, Chughtai was reelected to a second term with 60.7% of the first-round vote. The DFL endorsed her for reelection in a virtual vote after violence at the Ward 10 DFL convention forced early adjournment. Her challenger Nasri Warsame's supporters had stormed the stage and assaulted Chughtai's staff and supporters.

=== 2025 Minneapolis City Council election ===
Chughtai was reelected in 2025, defeating executive director of the Stevens Square Community Organization and Target corporate employee Lydia Millard.

The ward saw no DFL endorsement when Chughtai earned 52% of the vote to Millard's 47% and delegates unanimously voted to end the convention early rather than hold further votes. Chughtai alleges that she was assaulted during the convention by one of Millard's supporters.

Chughtai was opposed by We Love Minneapolis PAC, a political action committee chaired in part by ward 10 landlords and business owners Andrea Corbin and Jim Rubin. After We Love Minneapolis disbanded, Thrive MPLS formed, with an overlap in staff, and began supporting her competitor. Chughtai was also opposed by All of Minneapolis PAC, a PAC promoting conservative Democrats in Minneapolis.

Political organizations supporting Chughtai included Minneapolis for the Many PAC, Women Winning, Outfront Action, Sunrise Twin Cities, and the Twin Cities Democratic Socialists of America. Several labor unions and politicians endorsed her.

== Personal life ==
Chughtai strongly identifies as a renter, mentioning it on her campaign materials, and lives in Minneapolis's Whittier neighborhood. She has said this allows her to connect with her constituents, 80% of whom are renters.
