= Government of Minneapolis =

City government in the US state of Minnesota

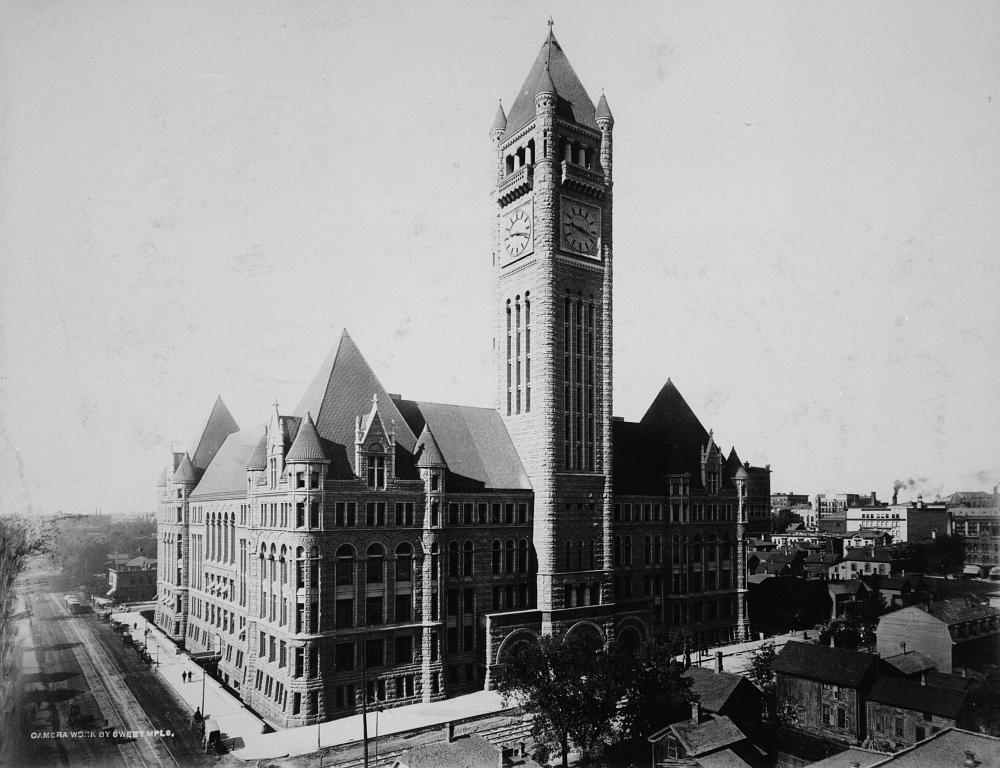
City Hall circa 1900

Minneapolis, the largest city in Minnesota, United States, and the county seat of Hennepin County, operates under a Mayor–council government system. This article provides an overview of the structure and functions of Minneapolis's city government.

== Charter and ordinances ==
Minnesota was the fourth state in the U.S. to permit "home rule" in 1896. A home rule charter serves as a constitution for a local government. It allows a community to establish and maintain a municipal corporation to provide for the common health, safety, and welfare.

Several early attempts to establish a home rule charter in Minneapolis failed. In 1920, the matter was resolved by the Minnesota State Legislature when it codified the general statutes applicable to first class cities as well as all special laws specific to the City of Minneapolis at that time into the City’s first home rule charter. That charter remained in effect—through multiple amendments—until 2013, when a complete revision, including the incorporation of plain language principles, was adopted by voters in 2013.

Ordinances are laws or regulations enacted by the city council designed to address the specific needs and concerns of Minneapolis, including zoning, public safety, noise control, and business regulation.

== Structure ==
=== City Council ===
The Minneapolis City Council is the primary legislative body, consisting of members elected from 13 wards. The council holds significant power over local legislation, budget decisions, and oversight of city departments.

=== Mayor ===
The Mayor of Minneapolis, currently a position held by a member of the Minnesota Democratic-Farmer-Labor Party (DFL), operates alongside the city council. The mayor's role was previously considered relatively weak compared to some other U.S. cities, but following a charter amendment in 2021, the mayor gained more executivepower and the council was reduced to purely legislative duties. The mayor appoints heads of various city departments.

=== Departments ===
- Minneapolis Police Department
- Minneapolis Fire Department

=== Administrative bodies ===
The city also includes several independent boards responsible for parks, taxation, public schools, and public housing. These boards have the authority to levy taxes and fees within their respective areas, subject to limitations set by the Board of Estimate and Taxation.

== Boards and commissions ==
=== Advisory ===
Name	Function	Members
Bicycle Advisory Committee	Advises on cycling policy and supports cycling infrastructure	29
Capital Long-Range Improvement Committee	Makes recommendations on capital improvement plan development	33
Community Environmental Advisory Commission	Advises on environmental policies and priorities, focusing on sustainability and health	19
Homegrown Minneapolis Food Council	Promotes local, sustainable food systems	25
Minneapolis Advisory Committee on Aging	Advises on senior concerns, liaises, recommends solutions	17
Minneapolis Advisory Committee on Housing	Advises on housing issues, promoting equity and addressing disparities	22
Minneapolis Advisory Committee on People with Disabilities	Ensures the city is accessible and compliant with the ADA	15
Minneapolis Public Housing Authority	Manages low-income public housing and section 8 rentals	9
Minneapolis Workforce Development Board	Guides city workforce development, focusing on internships and high-demand job awareness	21
Pedestrian Advisory Committee	Advises on enhancing pedestrian safety, mobility, and linkage to public transportation	26
Public Health Advisory Committee	Advises on health policies, reviews priorities, and addresses resident concerns	20
Transgender Equity Council	Represents interests of transgender and gender-nonconforming residents	15

=== Independent bodies ===
Name	Function	Members
Audit Committee	Oversees the Office of City Auditor	7
Board of Estimate and Taxation	Authorizes sale of municipal bonds and sets tax levies	6
Charter Commission	Maintains and amends the home rule charter	15
City Canvassing Board	Certifies election results	13
Civil Rights Commission	Promotes civil rights and enforces provisions	21
Community Commission on Police Oversight	Involves residents in police misconduct review process	15

== Political landscape and elections ==
Minneapolis is known as a stronghold for the DFL, reflecting a liberal-leaning political climate. The city council is predominantly composed of DFL members, with occasional representation from other parties such as the Green Party or independents affiliated with the Democratic Socialists of America.

City vote in presidential elections
Year	Democratic	Republican	Third Parties	Ref.
2024	85.02% 185,586	11.73% 25,593	3.25% 7,095	
2020	86.44% 204,841	11.31% 26,792	2.26% 5,344	
2016	79.84% 174,585	11.75% 25,693	8.41% 18,380	
2012	80.27% 172,480	16.55% 35,560	3.18% 6,839	
2008	81.15% 169,204	16.77% 34,958	2.09% 4,352	
2004	77.64% 156,214	20.69% 41,633	1.67% 3,366	
2000	65.72% 115,037	22.14% 38,758	12.14% 21,242	

== Neighborhoods ==
The city is divided into communities, each containing neighborhoods. For example, the Near North community is composed of the Hawthorne, Jordan, Near North, Sumner-Glenwood and Willard-Hay neighborhoods. Neighborhoods coordinate activities under the Neighborhood Revitalization Program. In some cases two or more neighborhoods act together under one organization. Some areas are commonly known by nicknames of business associations like Dinkytown, Downtown, Midtown and Uptown.

== Foreign consulates ==
The following list are countries that currently have consulate offices in Minneapolis:

- Canada
- Denmark
- Ecuador
- France
- Nicaragua
- Norway
- Sweden (Honorary Consulate General)
