= Millionaires' Mile =

Exclusive residential neighborhoods of various cities

The Millionaires' Mile, Millionaires' Row, Billionaires' Row, Golden Mile or Alpha Street are the exclusive residential neighborhoods of various cities, often along one scenic strip such as a riverside or hilltop drive, or a wide city boulevard.

== Characteristics ==
Millionaires' Miles are often found in neighborhoods by the name of the Gold Coast, from Gold Coast (region), in West Africa. There is the Gold Coast of Long Island, Boston's Gold Coast, and Chicago's Gold Coast to name a few.

Millionaires' Miles are characterized by the presence of great houses in varying architectural styles. Depending on the location, these may be stately homes, mansions, townhouses, esoteric modern creations or other imposing designs.

== United States ==
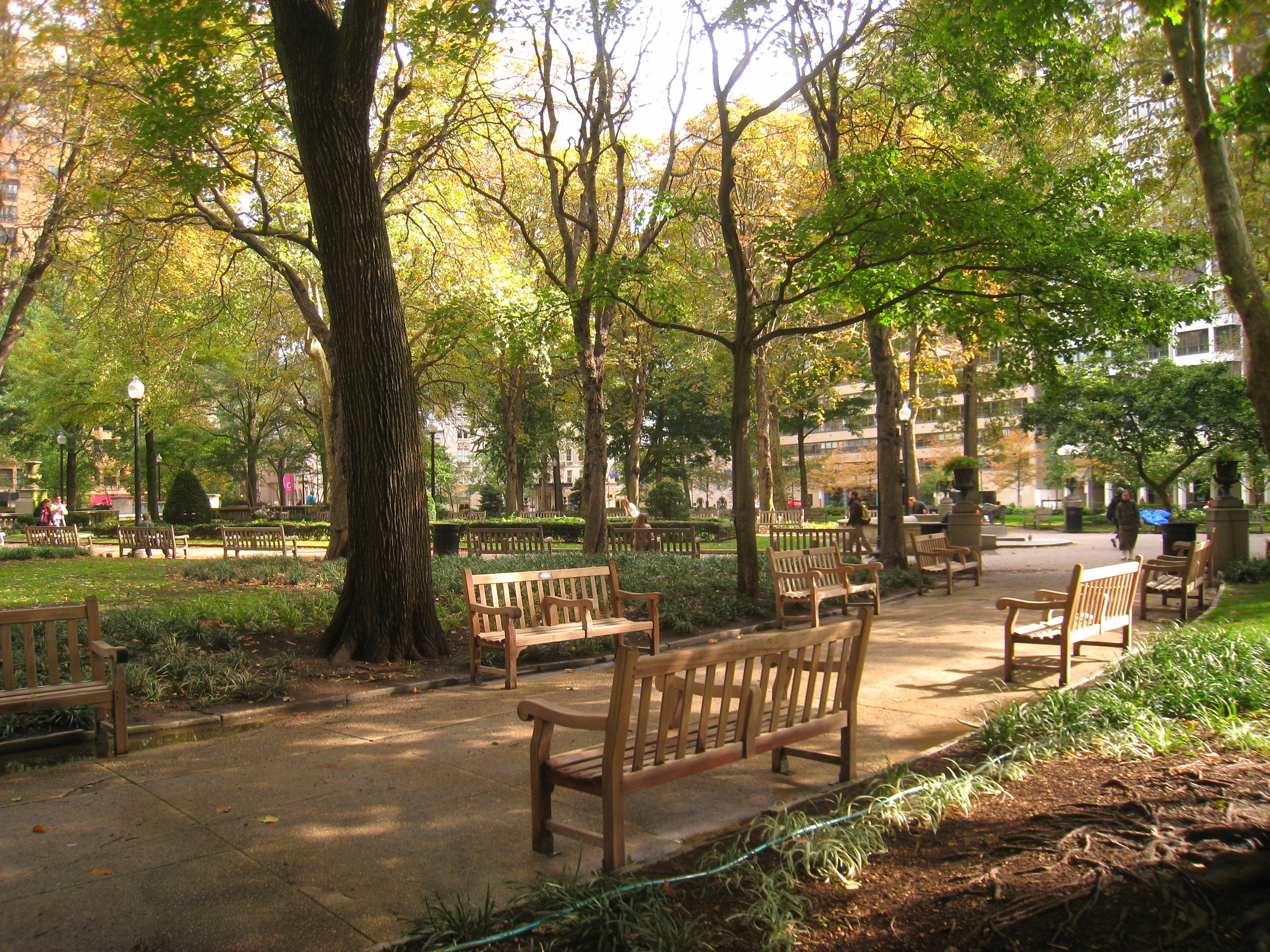
The Rittenhouse Square neighborhood of Philadelphia

Some well-known Millionaires' Miles include the following:

- Alexandria Bay, New York: A chain of islands in the Saint Lawrence River, from Stony Crest Island to Heart Island
- Asheville, North Carolina: Biltmore Forest
- Atlanta: West Paces Ferry Road in the Buckhead district of the city proper, and Riverside Drive NW in the suburb of Sandy Springs
- Baltimore: North Charles Street and St. Paul Street
- Baton Rouge, Louisiana: Dalrymple Drive and Lakeshore Neighborhood; Garden District
- Beverly Hills, California: Sunset Boulevard and Flats of Beverly Hills (north of Santa Monica Boulevard)
- Birmingham, Alabama: Crest Road, Stratford Road, Argyle Road, and Redmont Road
- Boston: Beacon Hill, Commonwealth Avenue, the Back Bay
- Boca Raton, Florida: Between Federal Highway (US 1) and Ocean Boulevard (including Downtown Boca Raton)
- Buffalo, New York: Delaware Avenue
- Charlotte, North Carolina: Queens Road West and Eastover Road
- Chicago: North Burling Street, The Magnificent Mile, particularly north Michigan Avenue, Lake Shore Drive
- Cincinnati: Dayton Street Historic District
- Cleveland: Euclid Avenue (historic)
- Dallas: Swiss Avenue, Strait Lane, Preston Hollow
- Deal, New Jersey: Ocean Avenue and surrounding streets
- Detroit: Palmer Woods, Strathcona Drive
- Fort Lauderdale, Florida: Bayview Drive, Rio isle, Las Olas
- Fort Worth, Texas: Crestline Road, Westover Circle, Shady Oaks Lane
- Golden Beach, Florida: Collins Avenue (State Road A1A)
- Hartford, Connecticut: Prospect Avenue (Governor's Row)
- Hillsboro Beach, Florida: Hillsboro Mile (State Road A1A)
- Houston: River Oaks
- Indian Creek, Florida: Indian Creek Island Road
- Indianapolis: Meridian Street
- Jacksonville, Florida: Ponte Vedra Boulevard
- Kansas City, Missouri: Ward Parkway, Janssen Place, Belinder Avenue
- Lafayette, Louisiana: West Bayou Parkway
- Lake George, New York: Along east and partially west sides of the lake
- Las Vegas: MacDonald Highlands east of MacDonald Ranch Drive, Grand Hills Drive in Seven Hills, Southern Highlands north of Golf Estates Drive, The Ridges north of Promontory Ridge Drive
- Laurel, Mississippi: Sixth Avenue and the lower numbered blocks of 5th Avenue.
- Longboat Key, Florida: Gulf of Mexico Boulevard, Longboat Key Club
- Los Angeles: Bel Air, Brentwood north of San Vicente Blvd., Wilshire Boulevard east of Westwood Village, North Carolwood Drive and South Mapleton Drive in Holmby Hills, Hollywood Hills, Mullholland Drive
- Malibu, California: Pacific Coast Highway (State Route 1) in Carbon Beach.
- Meridian, Mississippi: Poplar Springs Drive, 2300 to 3500 blocks and 29th Avenue, the 2800 to 3500 blocks
- Memphis, Tennessee: Adams Street
- Miami: Brickell (Brickell Avenue) and Coconut Grove (Coco Plum)
- Miami Beach, Florida: Mid-Beach and South Beach (along Collins Avenue), Star Island, Palm Island, and Hibiscus Island (all of the islands are on the MacArthur Causeway)
- Middletown, Ohio: South Main Street District
- Milwaukee: Lake Drive
- Minneapolis: The Cedar-Isles-Dean, Kenwood, and Lowry Hill neighborhoods of the affluent Calhoun-Isles community, located in scenic territory around the city's famous Chain of Lakes.
- Mobile, Alabama: Government Street
- Nashville, Tennessee: Belle Meade and Brentwood
- New Orleans: The Garden District, particularly St. Charles Avenue and its side streets, especially the gated Audubon Place
- New York City: along Fifth Avenue on the Upper East Side, The Hamptons (South Fork of Long Island)
- Newport, Rhode Island: Bellevue Avenue
- Oklahoma City: Nichols Hills, particularly Grand and Wilshire Boulevards
- Palm Beach, Florida: Worth Avenue and parts of South Ocean Boulevard
- Pasadena, California: South Orange Grove Boulevard
- Pass Christian, Mississippi: Scenic Drive
- Philadelphia: The Main Line, Chestnut Hill, Rittenhouse Square, and Society Hill
- Pittsburgh: Fifth Avenue
- Plaquemine, Louisiana: LaBauve Avenue and Bayou Road
- Portland, Oregon: Dunthorpe
- Raleigh, North Carolina: Holt Drive in Hayes Barton Historic District, White Oak Road in Anderson Heights, and Lakeview Drive in Country Club Hills
- Richmond, Indiana: Main Street, on National Road
- Richmond, Virginia: Monument Avenue, River Road and Cary Street
- St. Louis: Central West End near Forest Park, Lindell Boulevard, Portland Place and Westmoreland Place (both private)
- San Diego: Historic US Route 101 through Del Mar.
- San Francisco: Pacific Heights, Sea Cliff, St. Francis Wood
- St. Paul, Minnesota: Summit Avenue
- St. Petersburg, Florida and Clearwater, Florida: Gulf Blvd., Mandalay, Beach Drive, Snell Isle
- San Antonio: Contour Drive (Olmos Park), Ivy Lane (Terrell Hills)
- Santa Monica, California: Montana Avenue (north of Montana) and San Vicente Boulevard (north of San Vicente)
- Springfield, Ohio: East High Street
- Tampa, Florida: South Tampa, including Davis Island and Harbor Island, Fishhawk (The Preserve, Chapman Crossing, among others), Stone Lake Ranch, Cheval
- Washington, D.C.: Massachusetts Avenue, Kalorama, areas around Washington National Cathedral, River Road (MD), Georgetown Pike (VA)
- Wellesley, Massachusetts: Cliff Road
- Westchester County, New York: stretch of estates on both sides of Broadway from Irvington to Briarcliff Manor, known as Millionaires' Row
- Williamsport, Pennsylvania: Millionaire's Row Historic District, West Fourth Street
- Wilkes-Barre, Pennsylvania: River Street Historic District, Riverside Drive and South Franklin Street

== International examples ==
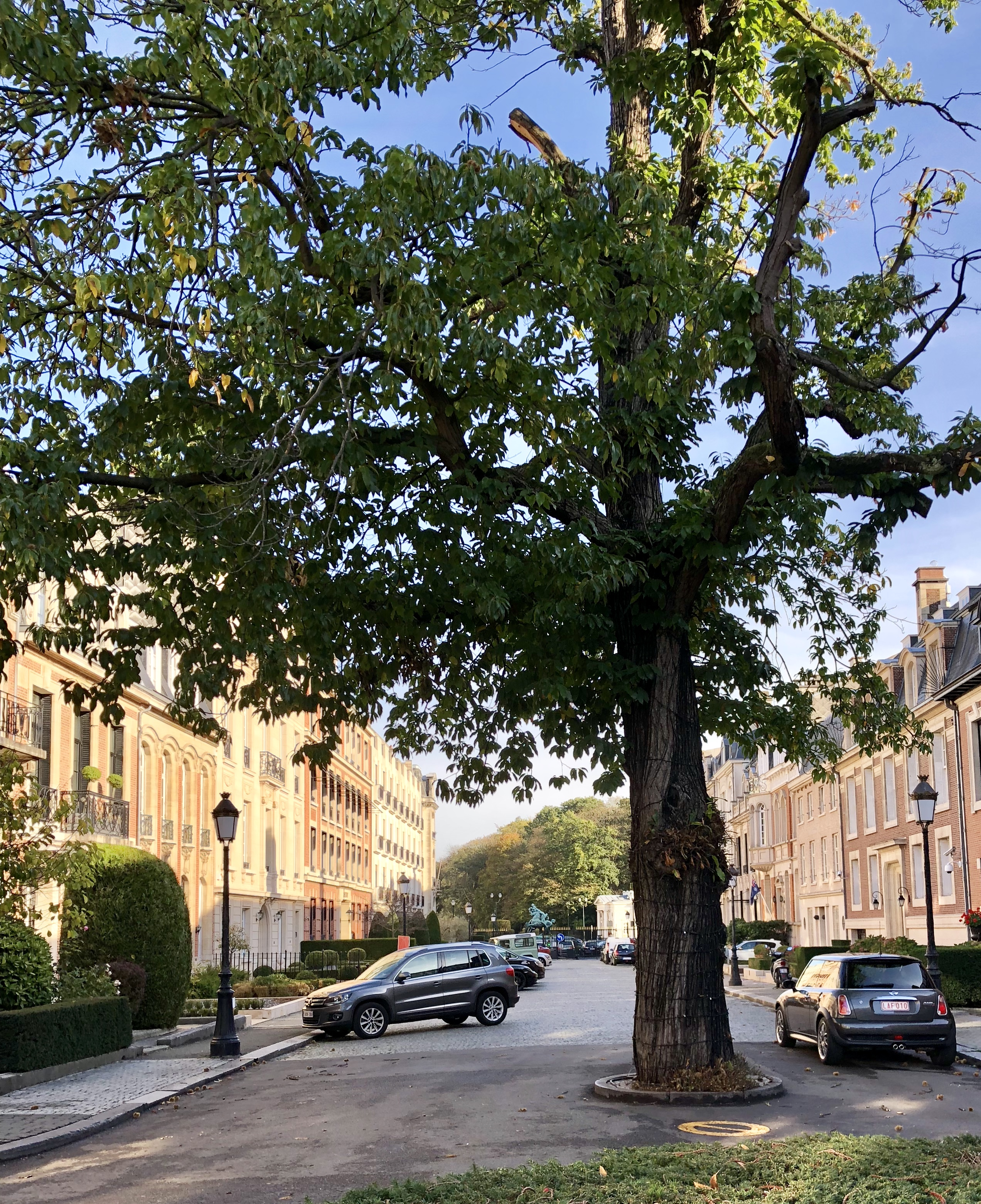
Square du Bois, Brussels

- Bacolod, Negros Occidental, Philippines: Burgos Street
- Brussels: Avenue Louise, Square du Bois
- Cairo: Nile Corniche
- Calgary: 'American Hill' (home to many Canadian oil tycoons), Mount Royal, Calgary
- Cape Town: Nettleton Road, Clifton, Cape Town
- Dublin: Shrewsbury Road, Ailesbury Road, Raglan Road, Dublin
- Hamburg: Elbchaussee, Harvestehuder Weg
- Hobart, Australia: Sandy Bay Road
- Hong Kong: Severn Road
- Iloilo City, Philippines: E. Lopez Street (Philippines' first millionaires' row) in Jaro, Iloilo City
- Jakarta: Kebayoran Baru, Menteng, Puri Indah, Pondok Indah, Pantai Indah Kapuk.
- London: Park Lane, The Bishop's Avenue in Hampstead Garden Suburb, the squares of Belgravia and Knightsbridge, Kensington Palace Gardens
- Lyon, France: Boulevard des Belges
- Makati, Philippines: McKinley Road in Forbes Park
- Marseille: Corniche Kennedy
- Melbourne: Towers Road, St Georges Road, Albany Road (Toorak). Monomeath Avenue and Mont Albert Road (Canterbury)
- Mexico City: along Paseo de la Reforma as it winds through Lomas de Chapultepec
- Montreal: Summit Circle area, Westmount; Golden Square Mile; Senneville
- Mumbai: Peddar Road, Malabar Hill and Altamount Road
- Ottawa: Rockcliffe Park
- Paris: Parts of the 16th arrondissement
- Poole, Dorset, England: Sandbanks
- Shanghai: Century Avenue, Huaihai Road
- Starnberg (millionaires' town) near Munich, Germany: Seestraße
- Stockholm, Sweden: Biblioteksgatan, Strandvägen
- Surabaya: Many locations in West Surabaya (Darmo Permai, Graha Famili, Citraland, Satelit), Kertajaya Indah.
- Sydney: Wolseley Road, Point Piper
- Toronto: Bridle Path, York Mills, Lawrence Park, Forest Hill, and Rosedale in Toronto.
- Vancouver: West Vancouver and Shaughnessy.
- Victoria, British Columbia, Canada: Beach Drive in Uplands, Oak Bay. Queenswood Drive in Ten Mile Point, British Columbia.
- Wellington, New Zealand: Oriental Bay Drive
- Winnipeg: Wellington Crescent, River Heights and Tuxedo
- Zurich: Goldcoast (Switzerland)
- Dubai: Palm Jumeirah
