= Bois de la Cambre =

Park in Brussels, Belgium

- Bois de la Cambre (French); Ter Kamerenbos (Dutch)
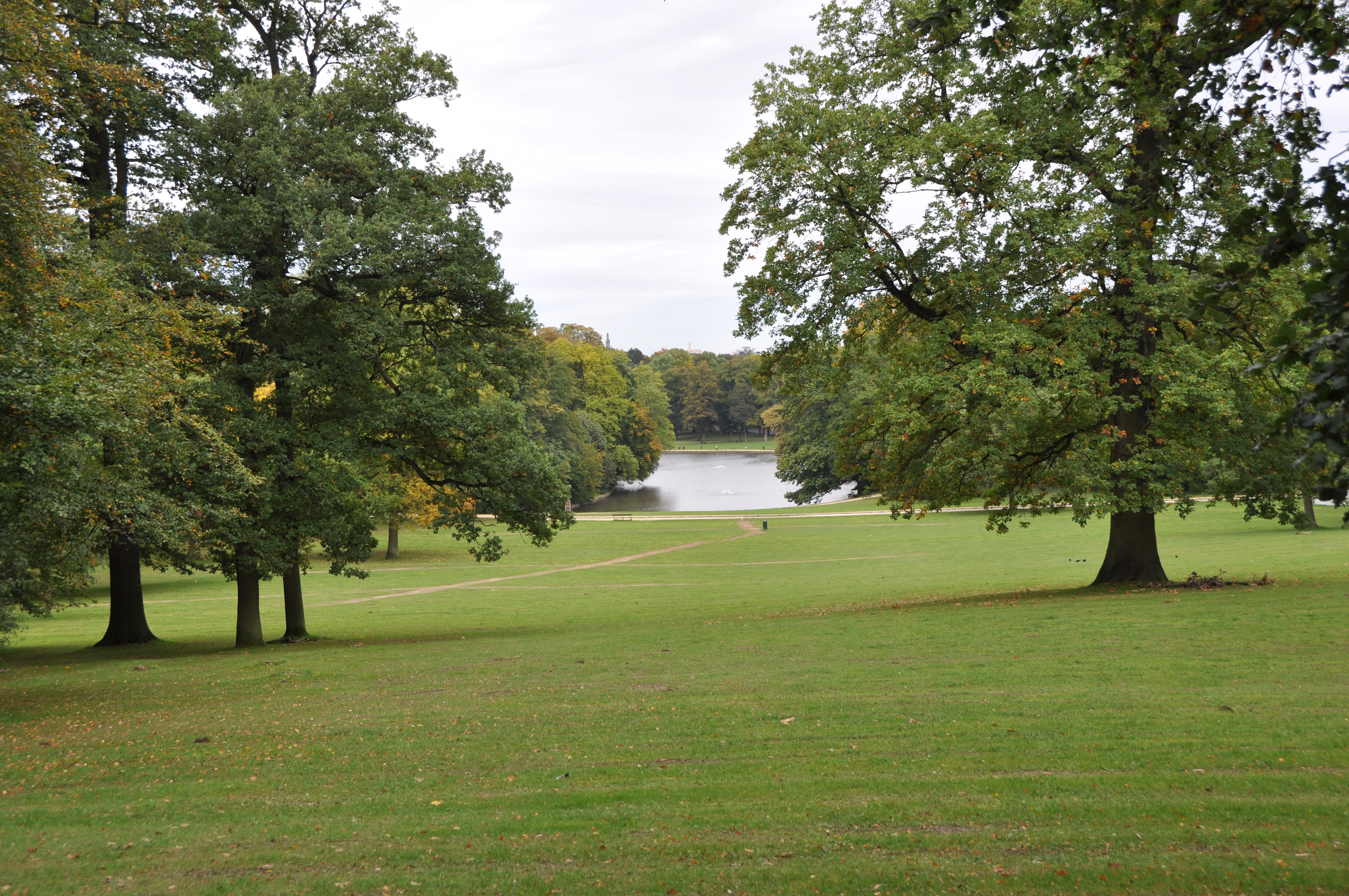
- The Bois de la Cambre/Ter Kamerenbos and its lake in Brussels
- Interactive map of Bois de la Cambre
- Type: Public park
- Location: City of Brussels, Brussels-Capital Region, Belgium
- Coordinates: 50°48′11″N 4°22′52″E
- Area: 122.34 ha (302.3 acres)
- Created: 1866
- Status: Open year-round
- Public transit: 2 6 Louise/Louiza

The Bois de la Cambre (French, pronounced [bwa d(ə) la kɑ̃bʁ]) or Ter Kamerenbos (Dutch, pronounced [tɛr ˈkaːmərə(m)bɔs]) is an urban public park in Brussels, Belgium. It lies in the south of the Brussels-Capital Region, in the City of Brussels, and covers an area of 1.23 km^{2} (0.47 sq mi), forming a natural offshoot of the Sonian Forest, which penetrates deep into the city in the south-east of Brussels. It is linked to the rest of the municipality by the Avenue Louise/Louizalaan, which was built in 1861, at the same time the park was laid out.

The park consists of two large, slightly oval parts. The northern part is the most wooded and is home to some 19th-century buildings. The southern part comprises a 6-hectare-large (15-acre) artificial lake with an island in its centre, called Robinson Island, home to the Chalet Robinson. (Note: Recalling The Swiss Family Robinson by Johann David Wyss, first published in 1812.)

== History ==
=== Early history ===
As an offshoot of the Sonian Forest during the Ancien Régime, the wooded area where the Bois de la Cambre is located today belonged to La Cambre Abbey, located just north of it, and was called the Heeghde or Heegde, an Old Dutch term possibly meaning "seigneurial wood". In 1840, it was given its current name after the abbey.

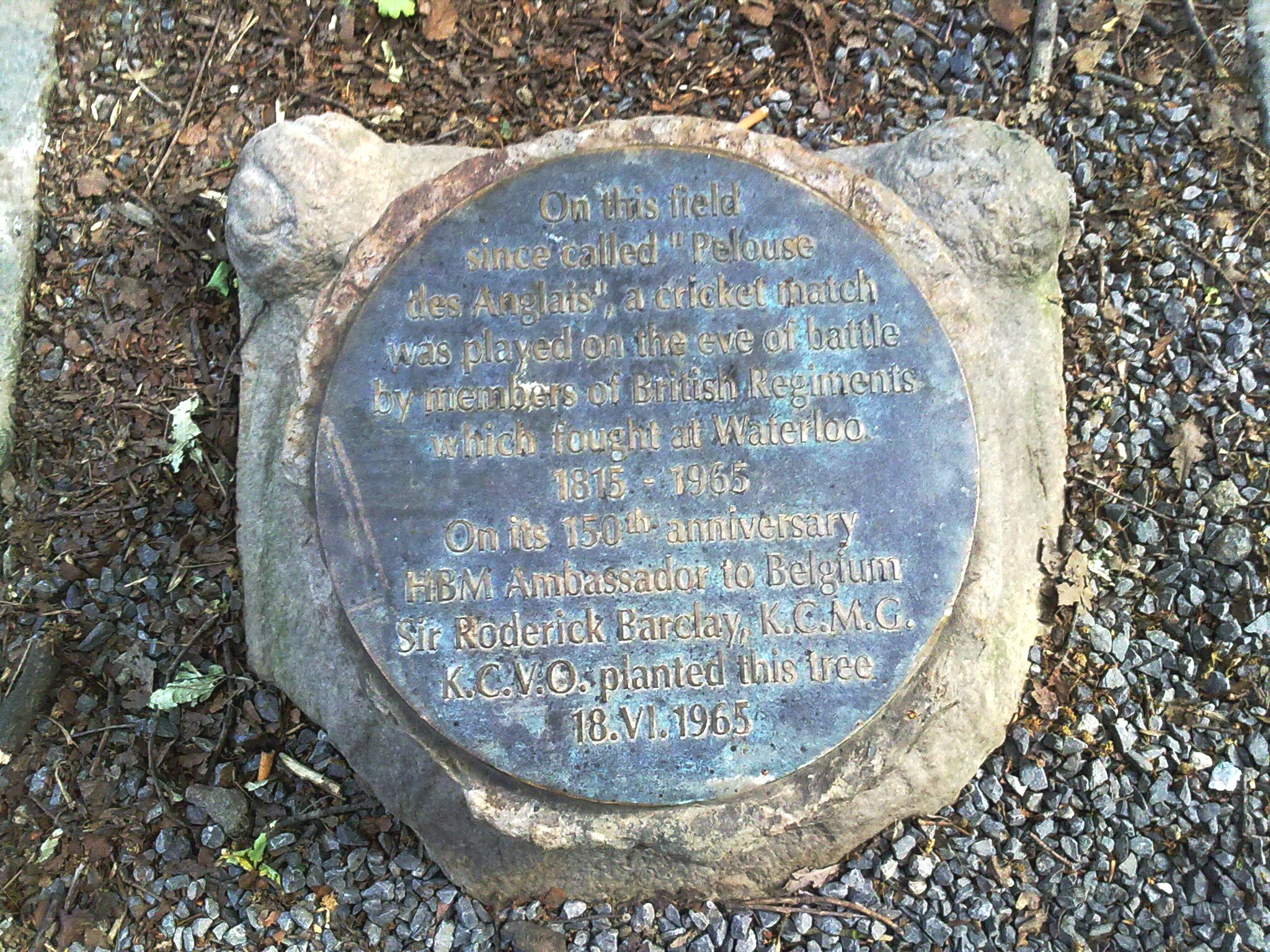
Bronze plaque (Note: The text reads: On this field, since called "Pelouse des Anglais" a cricket match was played on the eve of battle by members of British regiments which fought at Waterloo. 1815-1965. On the 150th anniversary HBM Ambassador to Belgium Sir Roderick Barclay KCMG KCVO planted this tree 18 VI 1815.) commemorating the 150th anniversary of the cricket match played by British troops before the Battle of Waterloo on 17 June 1815

On 17 June 1815, on the eve of the Battle of Waterloo, English soldiers played a cricket match on a ground located in the area currently covered by the park. Ever since, this area has been called la Pelouse des Anglais ("The Englishmen's Lawn"), although few are aware of the name. In 1965, the then British Ambassador in Belgium planted an oak tree and unveiled a bronze plaque to commemorate the 150th anniversary of this sporting and historical event.

=== 19th-century development ===
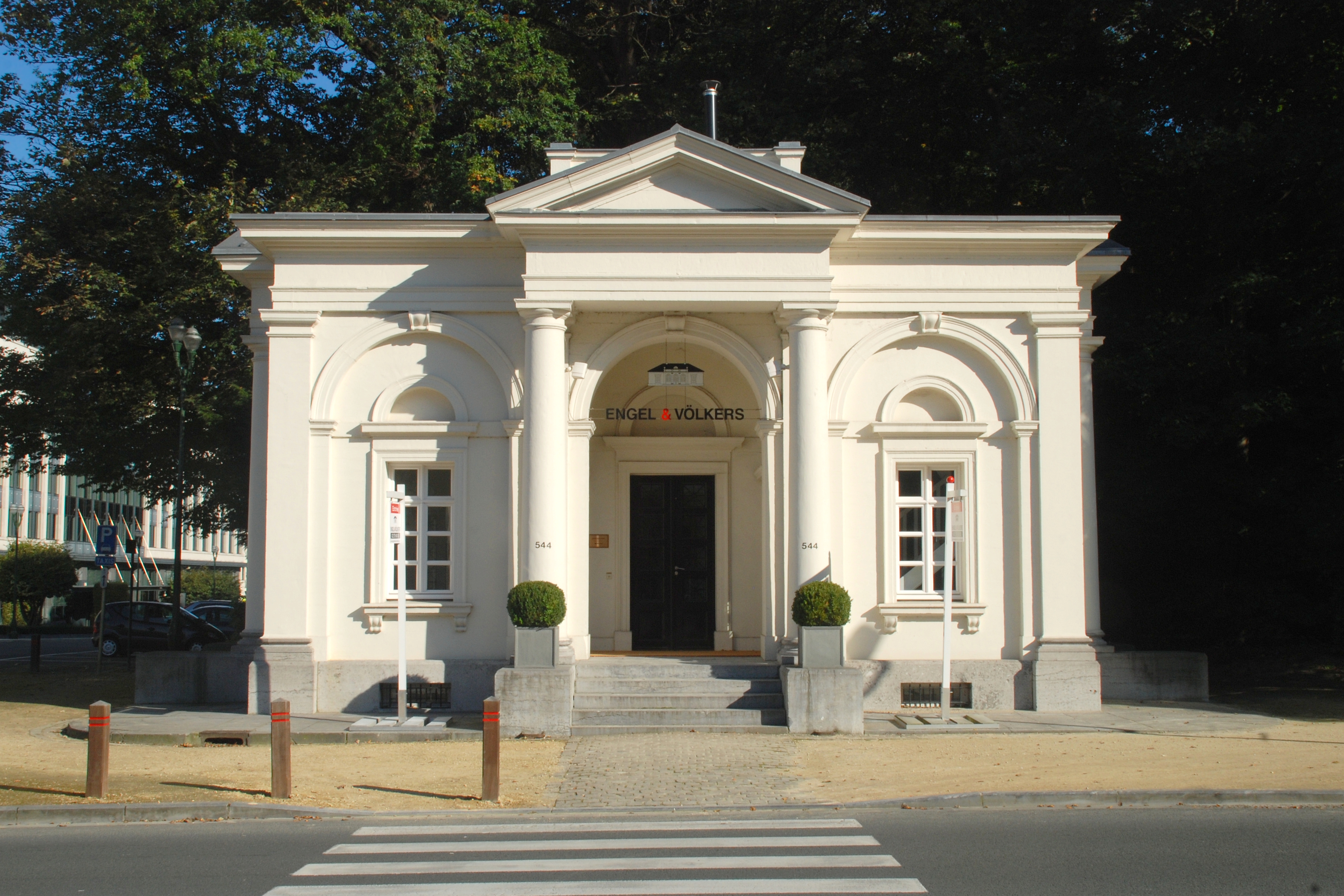
One of the two former octroi pavilions of the Namur Gate, now at the entrance of the Bois de la Cambre

From 1846, the Brussels authorities wished to provide the city with a large wooded park and proposed a development plan for La Cambre by converting an area of 107 ha (260 acres) of the Sonian Forest. The condition was that two-thirds of the trees would be preserved and a 100 metres (330 ft) zone around the park would remain undeveloped. The decision was prompted by the popularity of the place among well-to-do walkers, who were increasingly less fond of the industrialising Allée Verte/Groendreef in northern Brussels.

The Bois de la Cambre was laid out starting in 1861 by Édouard Keilig, a German architect. His project, relating to English landscaping, was characterised by an irregularity in the plantations and roads, by alternating massifs and clearances allowing visual escapes, and by the creation of picturesque scenes. The park, property of the Belgian state since 1843, was granted through a royal decree issued on 21 April 1864 to the City of Brussels, which is responsible for its development and maintenance. In 1863, the two neoclassical former octroi pavilions (French: pavillons d'octroi) of the Namur Gate by the architect Auguste Payen from 1836 were moved to the entrance of the Bois de la Cambre. In 1866, the park, largely landscaped, was open to the public and aroused considerable enthusiasm.

The place quickly became a popular recreational area for the people of Brussels, comparable to the Bois de Boulogne in Paris. In addition to its many promenades, it hosted a dairy, a velodrome, a theatre, an artificial boating lake, as well as a racecourse. Queen Marie-Henriette, wife of King Leopold II, often went riding in the park. The horsemen's battle bronze sculptural group at the entrance is the work of the Anglo-Belgian sculptor Jacques de Lalaing.

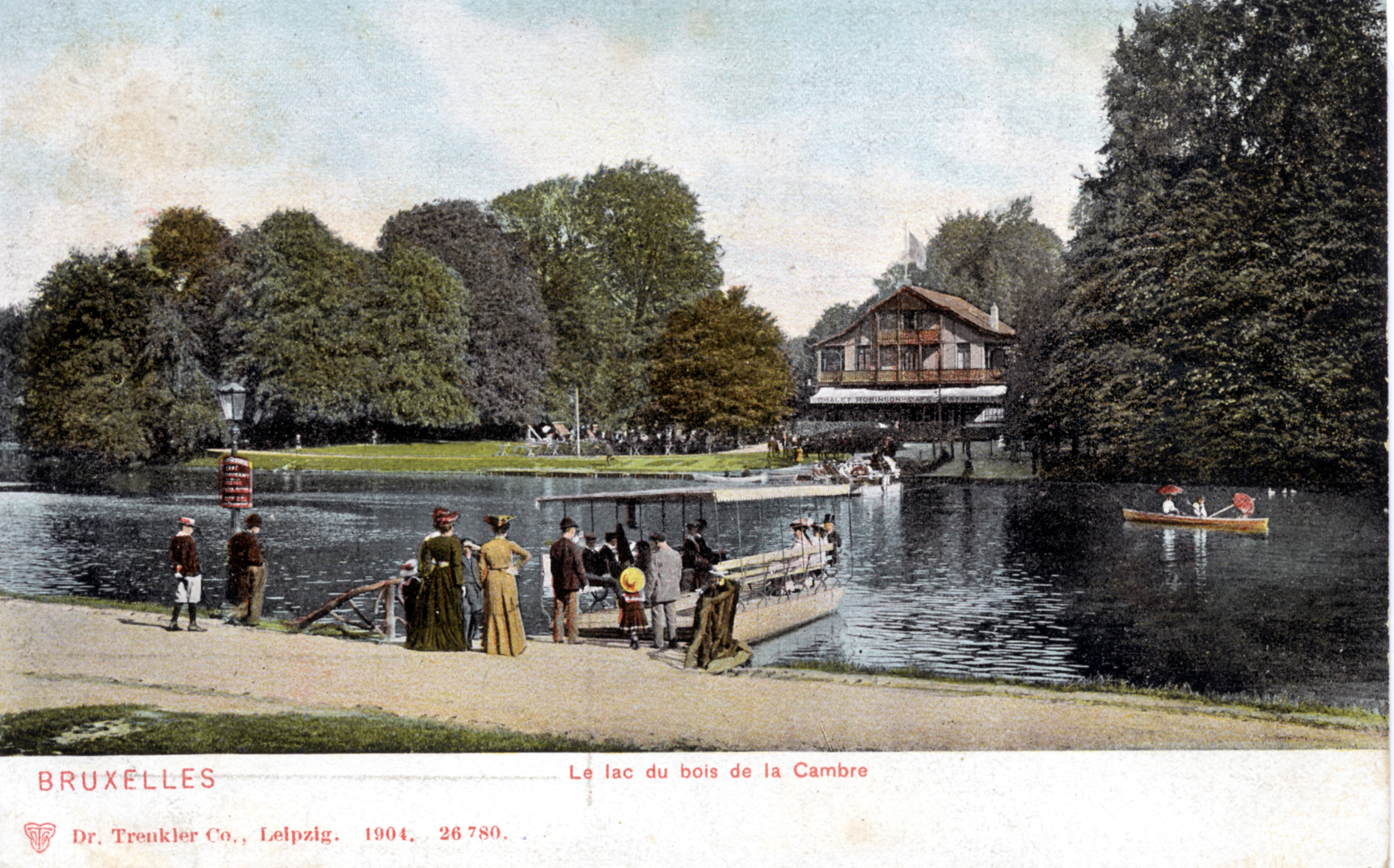
View of the Bois de la Cambre's lake and Chalet Robinson, c. 1904

=== 20th and 21st centuries ===
With the rise of motorised traffic in the early 20th century, the Bois de la Cambre's avenues were increasingly turned into thoroughfares fragmenting the park. The park was protected as a landscape in 1976 and was designated a special protection zone within the framework of Natura 2000 in 2004. Since 1985, it has also hosted a cycling event every spring for scout groups, the 24 heures vélo du bois de la Cambre.

Nowadays, the question of the park's closure to motorised traffic is regularly raised. The main road around the lake has been closed to traffic on Saturdays and Sundays since the 1990s. In April 2012, a new mobility plan, drawn up at the request of the City of Brussels, proposed a partial closure of the park to motorists, and the requalification of the public space for cyclists and pedestrians. In March 2020, traffic was temporarily banned from the park due to the COVID-19 pandemic in Belgium. At the end of May, cars were allowed again in its northern part. As of 14 December 2020, a new traffic plan has been in effect with access for cars in the northern and southern parts on weekdays, and only in the northern part on Saturdays and during school holidays. The park is car-free on Sundays.

== The Chalet Robinson ==
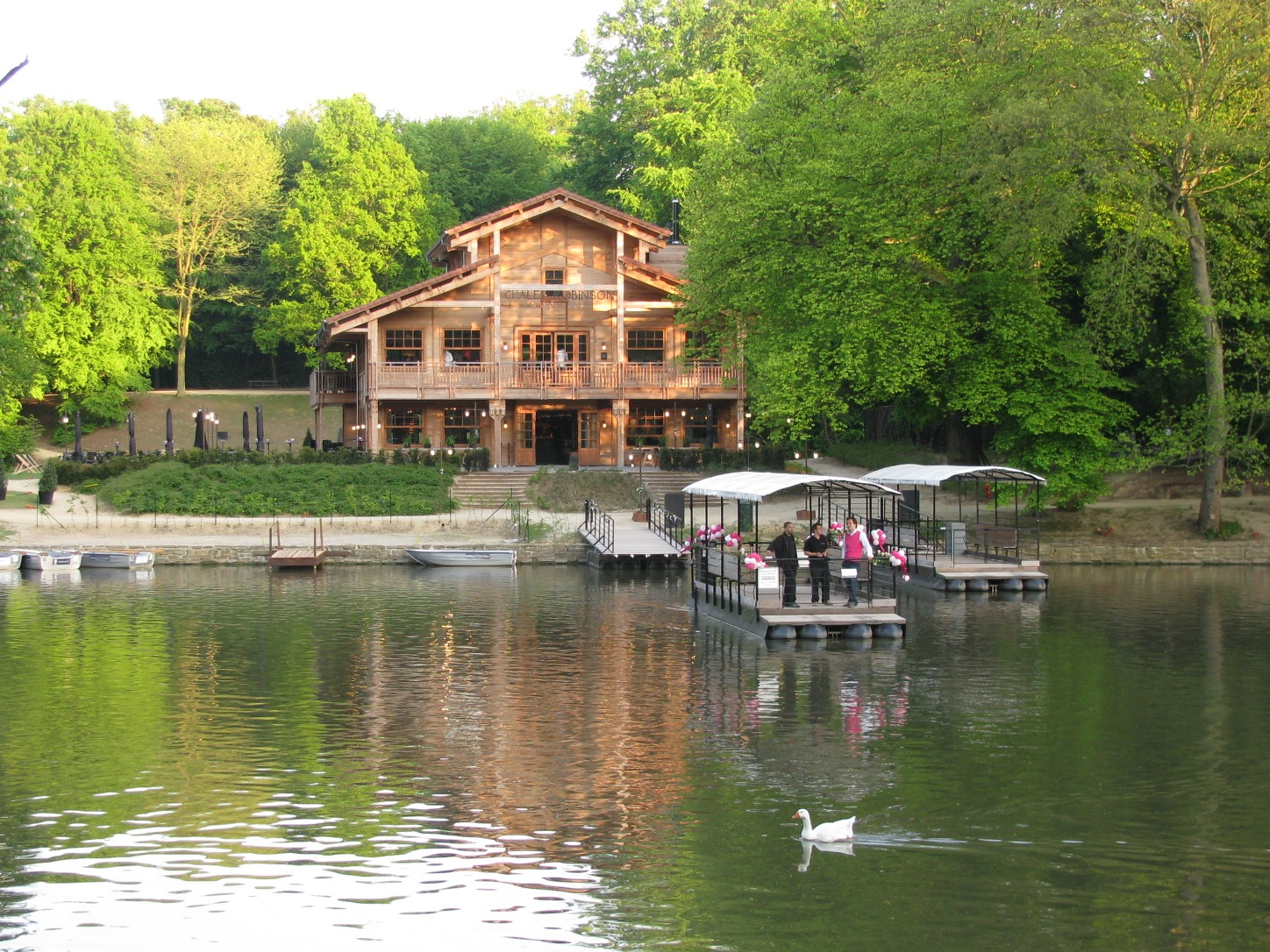
View of the Chalet Robinson across the lake

In 1877, the Chalet Robinson, a tea-room café designed in picturesque Swiss chalet style, was built on the lake's island, known as Robinson Island (French: Île Robinson, Dutch: Robinson Eiland). The chalet was twice destroyed by fire; the first time in 1896, and the second time in 1991. The decision was made in 2006 to rebuild it and it reopened to the public in September 2009. The surface of the wooden building is approximately 300 m^{2} (3,200 sq ft), with a restaurant on the ground floor and a ballroom on the first floor. An electrical ferry boat links the island to the shores of the lake.

== Gallery ==
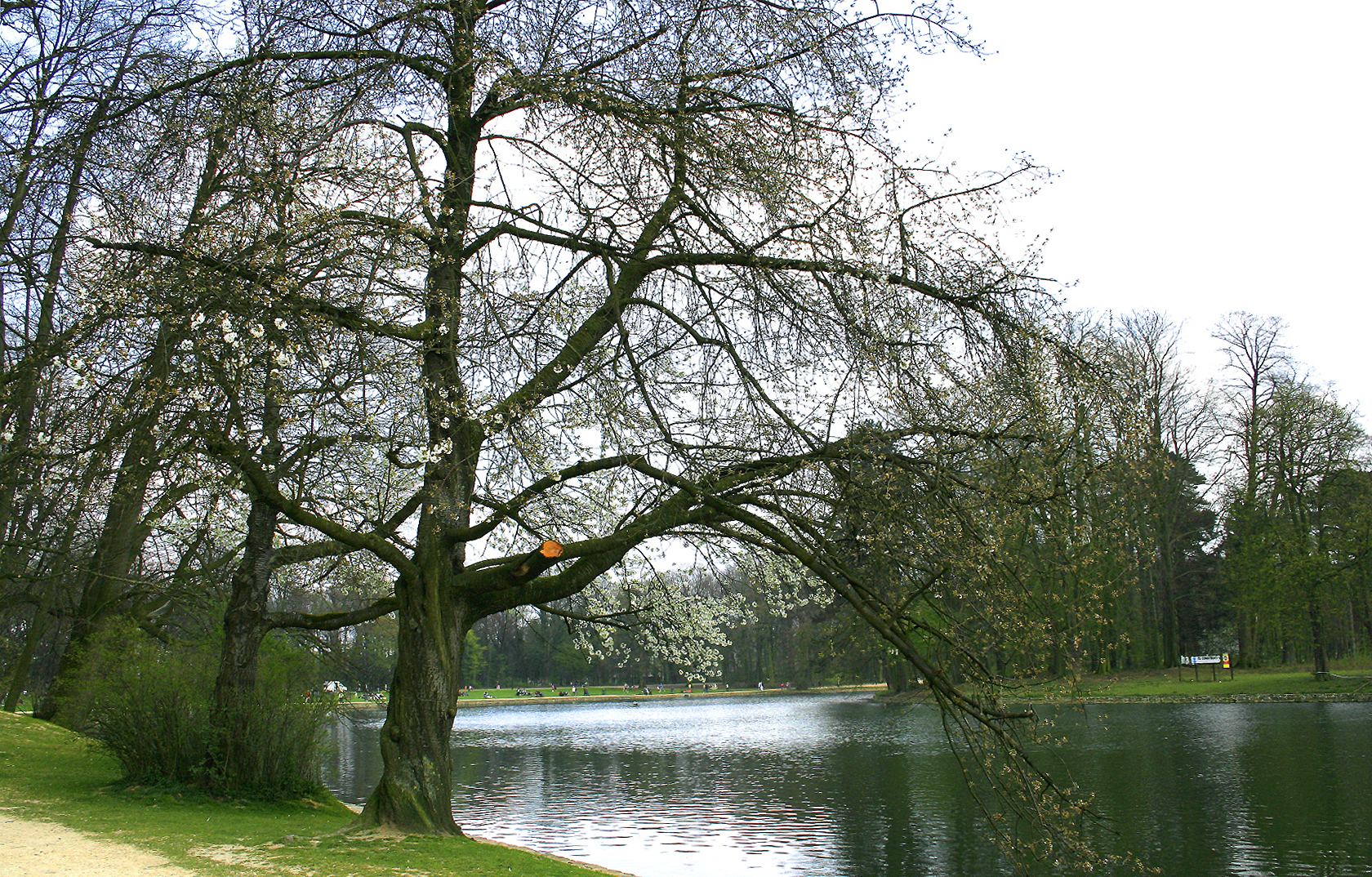
View of the lake at the Bois de la Cambre

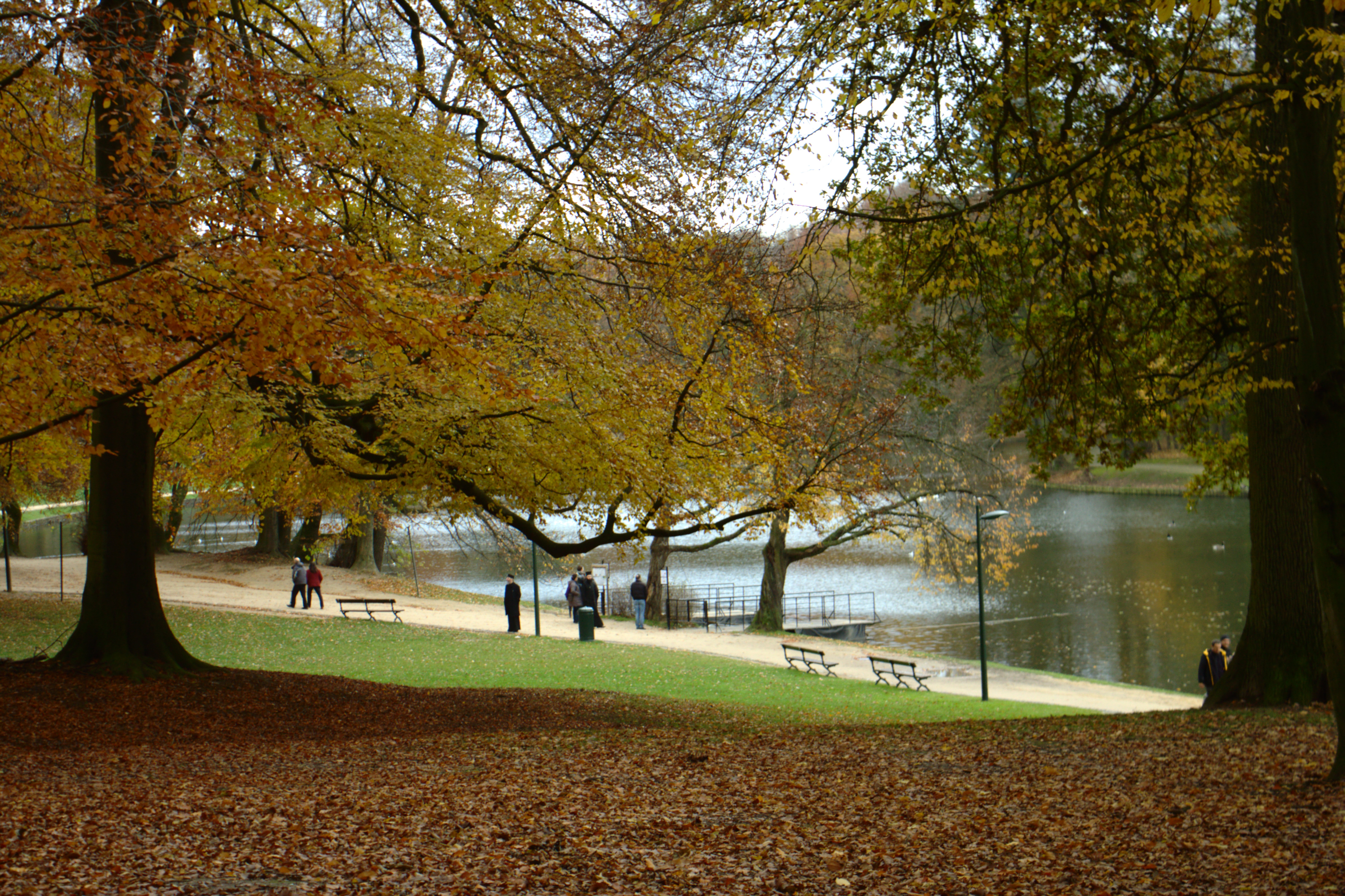
The Bois de la Cambre in the autumn

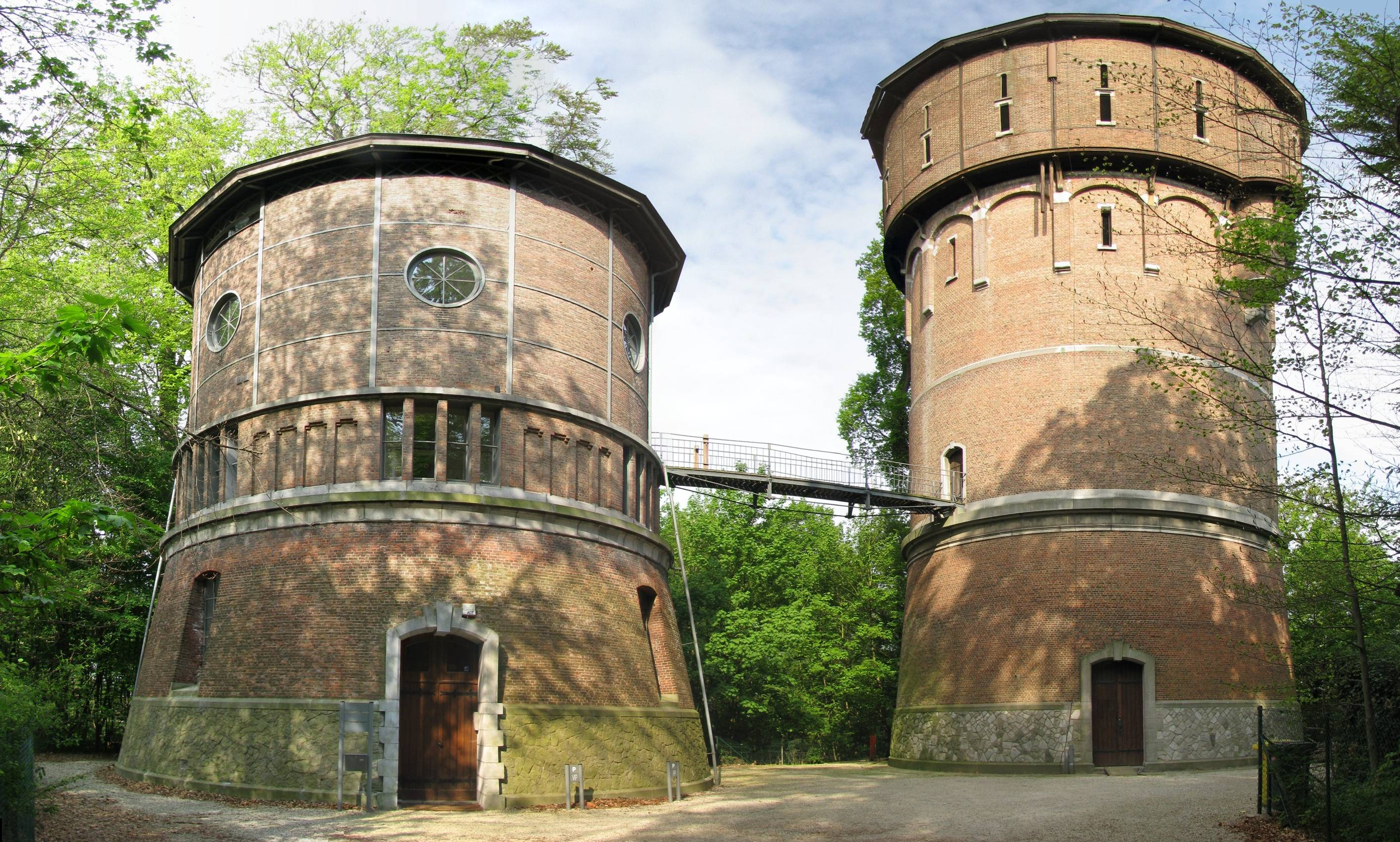
Water towers

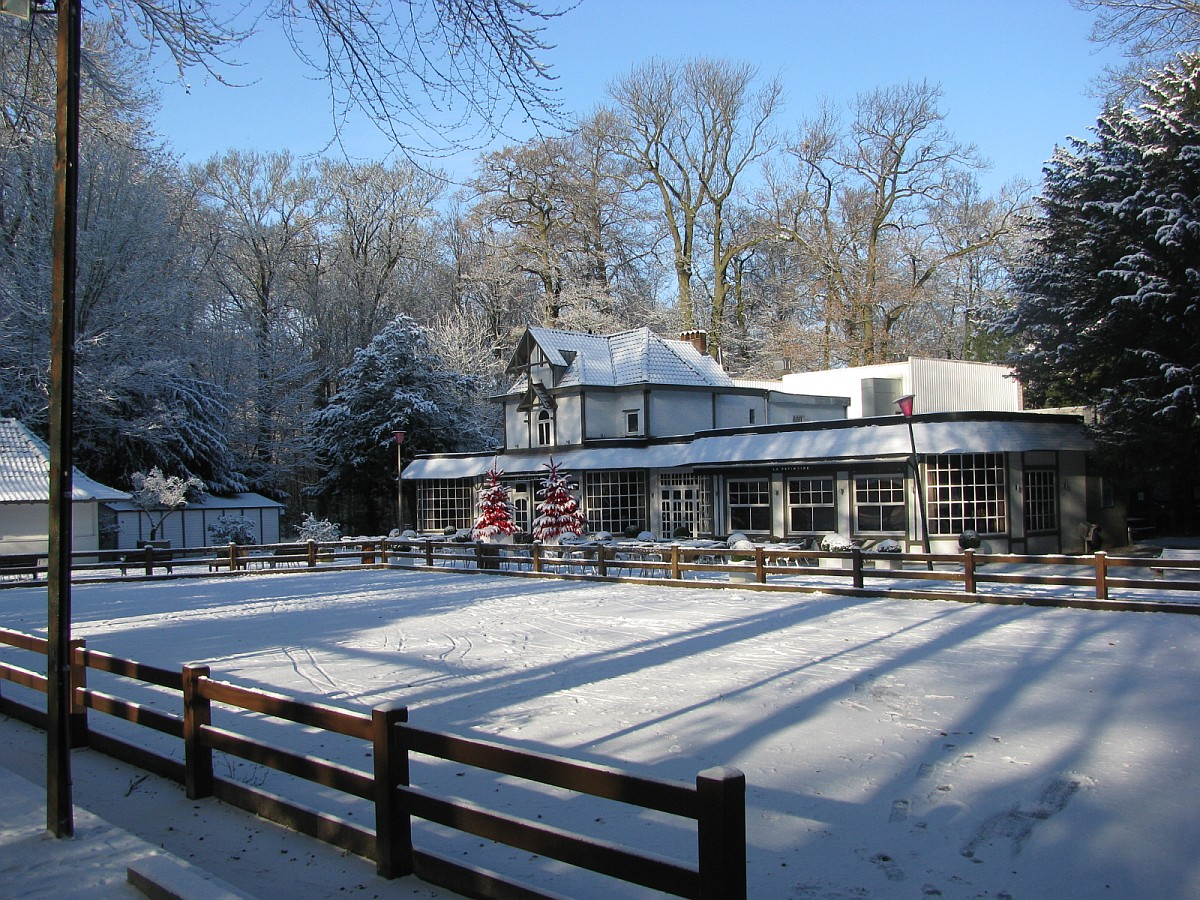
Ice rink in the snow

== See also ==
- List of parks and gardens in Brussels
- Square du Bois
- History of Brussels
- Belgium in the long nineteenth century
