= Square du Bois =

Gated community in Brussels, Belgium

Square du Bois (French); Bossquare (Dutch)
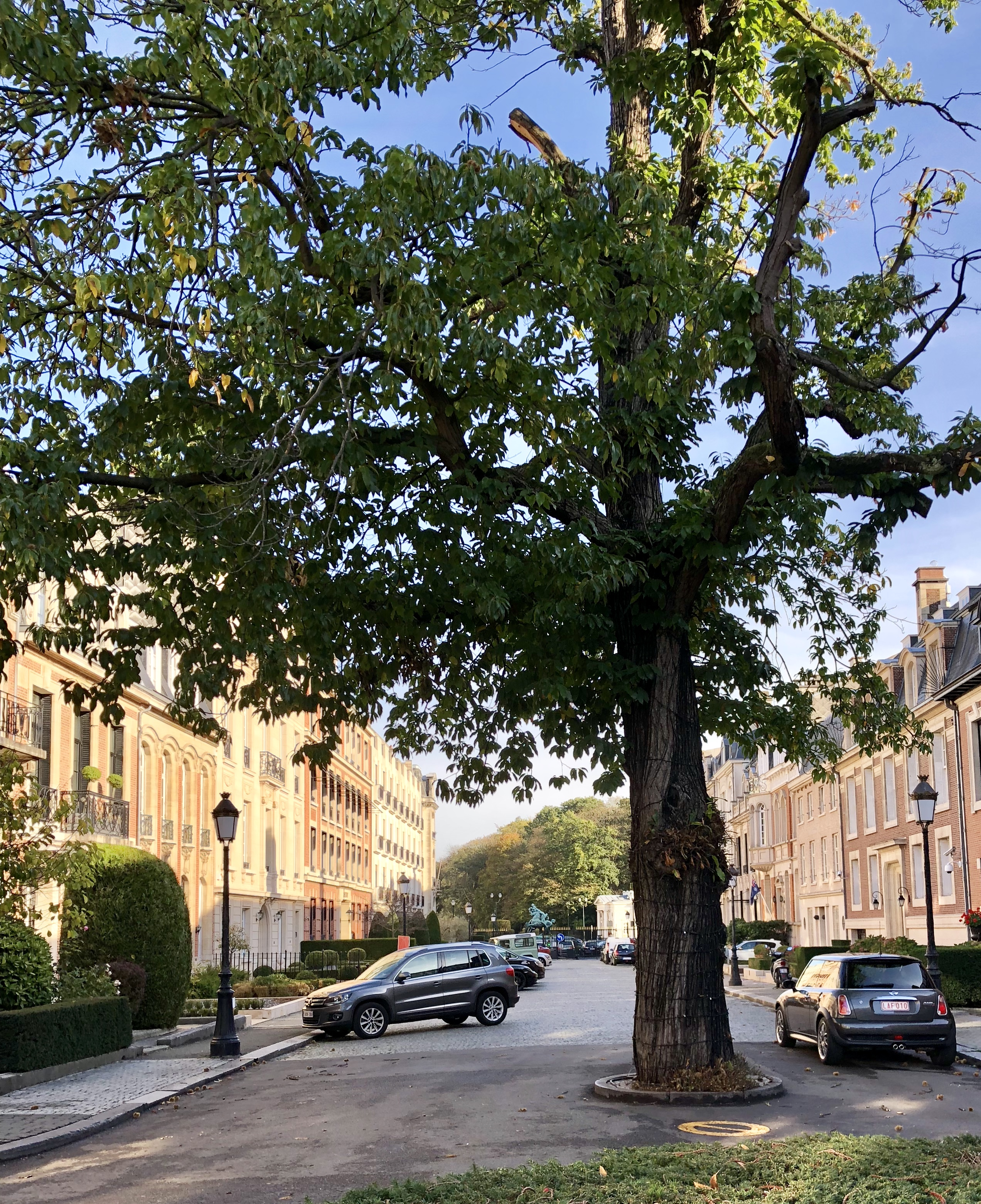
- The Square du Bois/Bossquare seen from the inside with the entrance gates in the distance
- Interactive map of: Square du Bois (French); Bossquare (Dutch)
- Coordinates: 50.814738°N 4.3687747°E
- From: Avenue Louise/Louizalaan 535
- To: Avenue Louise/Louizalaan 587

Construction
- Completion: 1913

The Square du Bois (French, pronounced [skwaʁ dy bwa]) or Bossquare (Dutch, pronounced [ˈbɔskʋɛːr]), meaning "Wood Square", now also known by its nickname the Square des Milliardaires or Miljardairssquare ("Billionaires' Square"), is a gated community in Brussels, Belgium, next to the Avenue Louise/Louizalaan. It belongs to the owners who live there and who bear the cost of maintenance, development and repair.

== History ==
The street was laid out in 1913 on the site of the former Villa Joseph Tasson (built around 1880 according to plans by Jean Baes and demolished in 1910). The first houses were the work of Léon Govaerts and were completed in 1915, after which construction continued until the 1930s.

A 1920 regulation on co-ownership banned commercial activities on the street and the division of houses into apartments. Due to exceptions granted over the years, the 27 houses still contained 61 units in 2008.

Fences were installed around 1993 so that access to the square could be closed off. The fences' gates have been closed since about 2000 to keep the curious at bay.

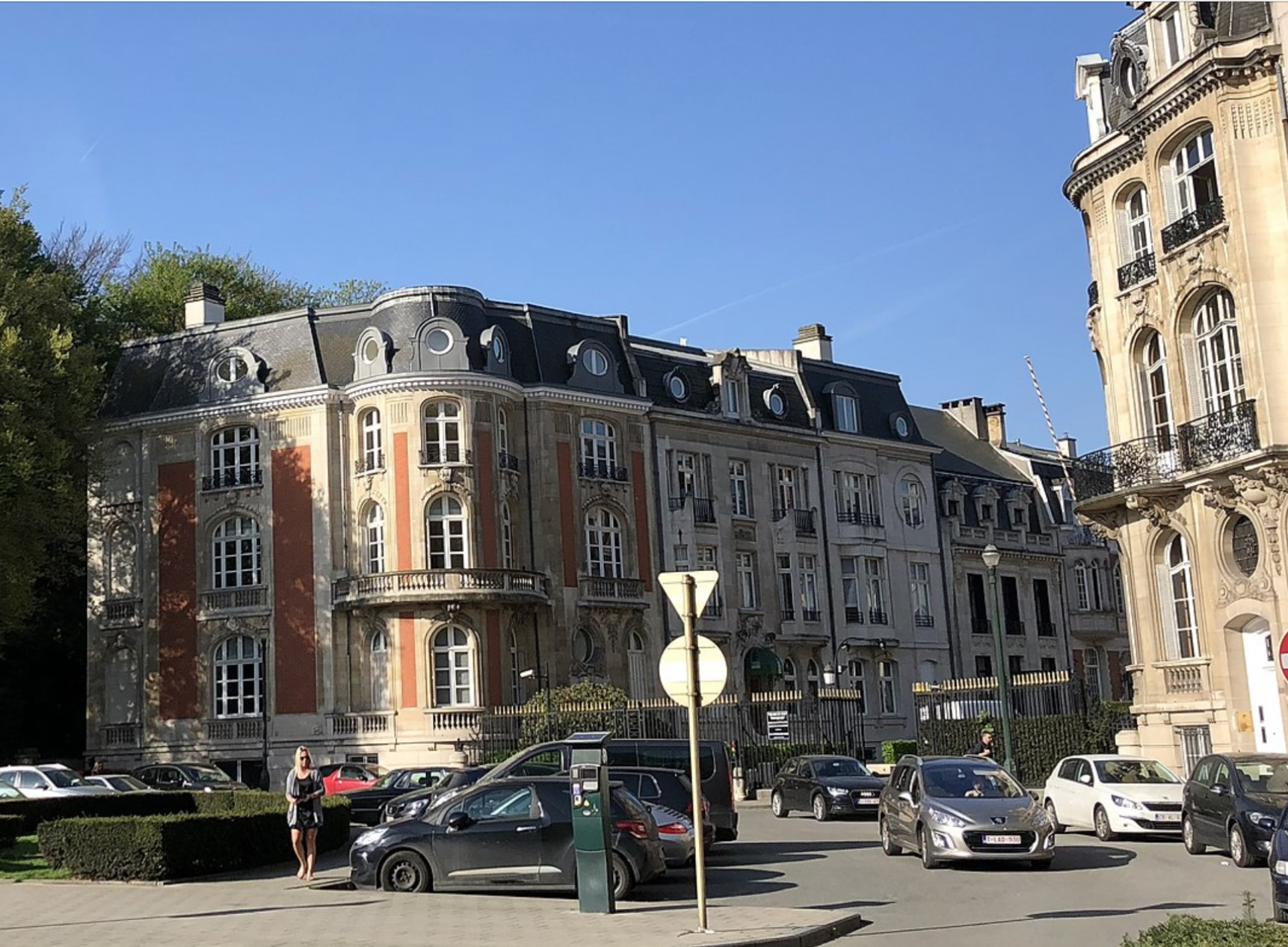
Entrance gates of the Square du Bois/Bossquare

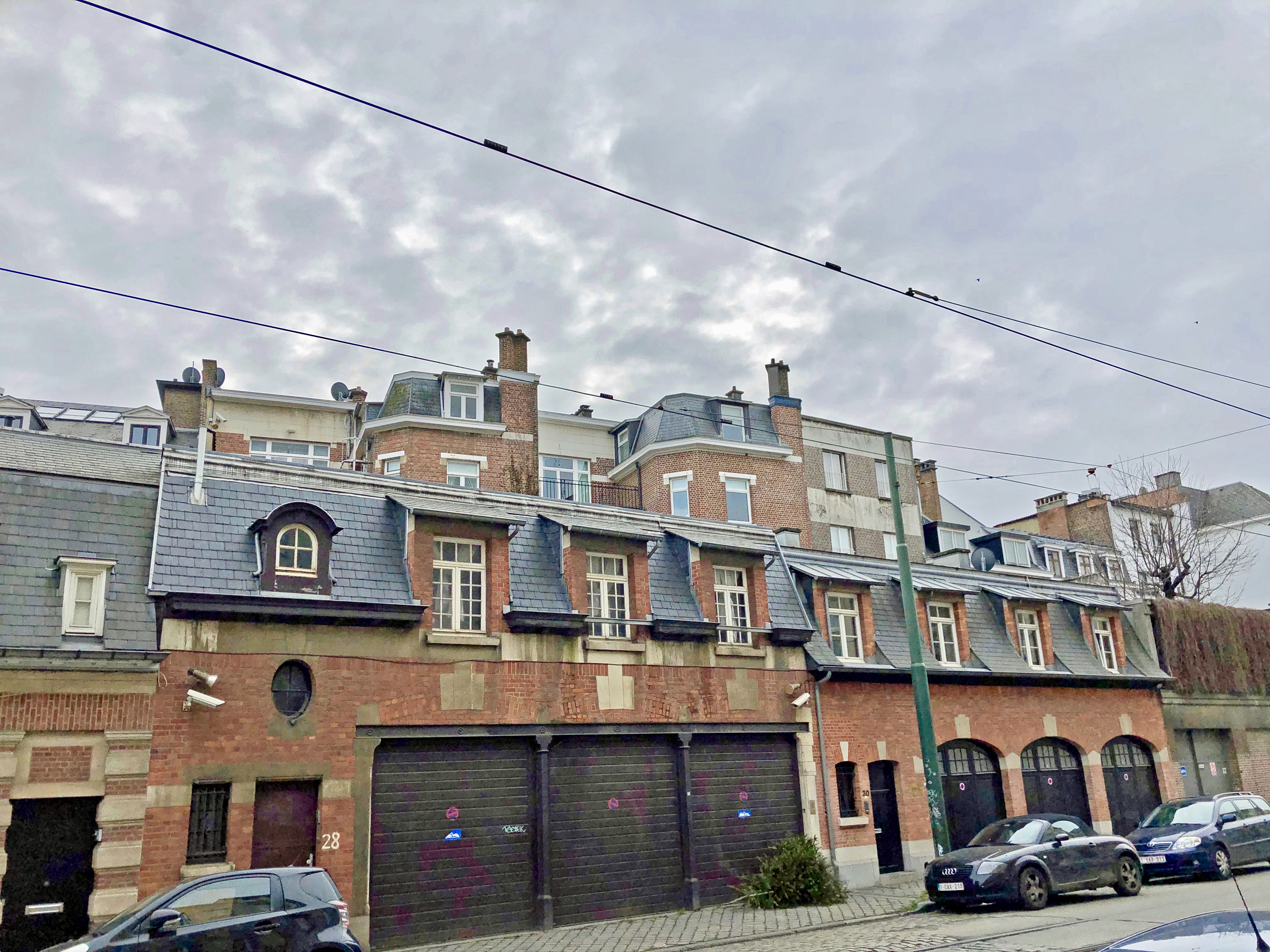
Attic rooms and garages at 24–44, avenue Legrand/Legrandlaan, at the rear of the square

== See also ==
- List of most expensive streets by city
- Millionaires' Mile
- Bois de la Cambre
