= Avenue Louise =

Thoroughfare in Brussels, Belgium

Avenue Louise (French); Louizalaan (Dutch)
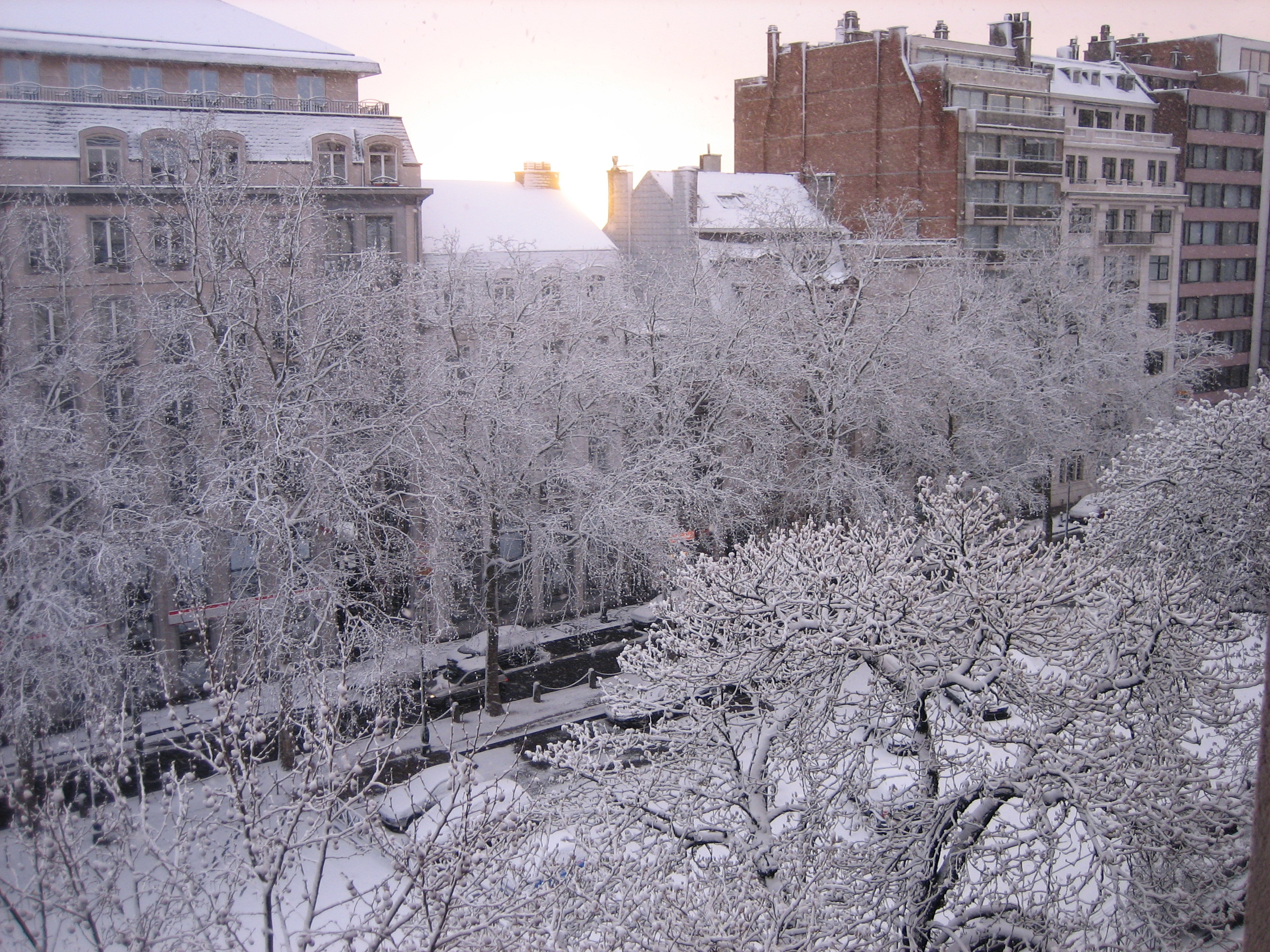
- The Avenue Louise/Louizalaan in winter

- Location within Brussels Location within Belgium
- Namesake: Queen Louise and Princess Louise
- Type: Avenue
- Location: City of Brussels, Ixelles and Saint-Gilles, Brussels-Capital Region, Belgium
- Postal code: 1050
- Coordinates: 50°49′37″N 04°21′52″E

Construction
- Commissioned: 1844
- Construction start: 1860
- Inauguration: 1866

The Avenue Louise (French, pronounced [avny lwiz]) or Louizalaan (Dutch, pronounced [luˈizaˌlaːn]) is a major thoroughfare in Brussels, Belgium. It is located in the southern part of the City of Brussels, on the border with the municipalities of Saint-Gilles and Ixelles, where it runs south–east from the Place Louise/Louizaplein to the Bois de la Cambre/Ter Kamerenbos, covering a distance of 2.7 km (1.7 mi). It is named in honour of both Queen Louise, the first Queen of the Belgians and wife of King Leopold I, and Princess Louise, King Leopold II's eldest daughter.

The Avenue Louise is one of the most prestigious and expensive avenues in Brussels, lined with high-end fashion stores and boutiques. It also houses many embassies and offices. The avenue is served by Louise/Louiza metro station at one end (on lines 2 and 6 of the Brussels Metro), as well as the tram lines 8 and 93, which run its entire length.

== History ==
=== Inception and construction ===
The Avenue Louise was first proposed in 1844 by two private property developers, Jean-Philippe De Joncker and Jean-Baptiste Jourdan, who submitted to the City of Brussels a plan for a monumental avenue bordered by chestnut trees that would allow easy access from Brussels' city centre to the popular recreational area of the Bois de la Cambre/Ter Kamerenbos. This large avenue was to be drawn as an extension of the district they had created in 1838–39 around the current "Louise bottleneck" (see below). Inspired by the Boulevards of Paris, it was also to be one of the first Haussmann-esque arteries of the city.

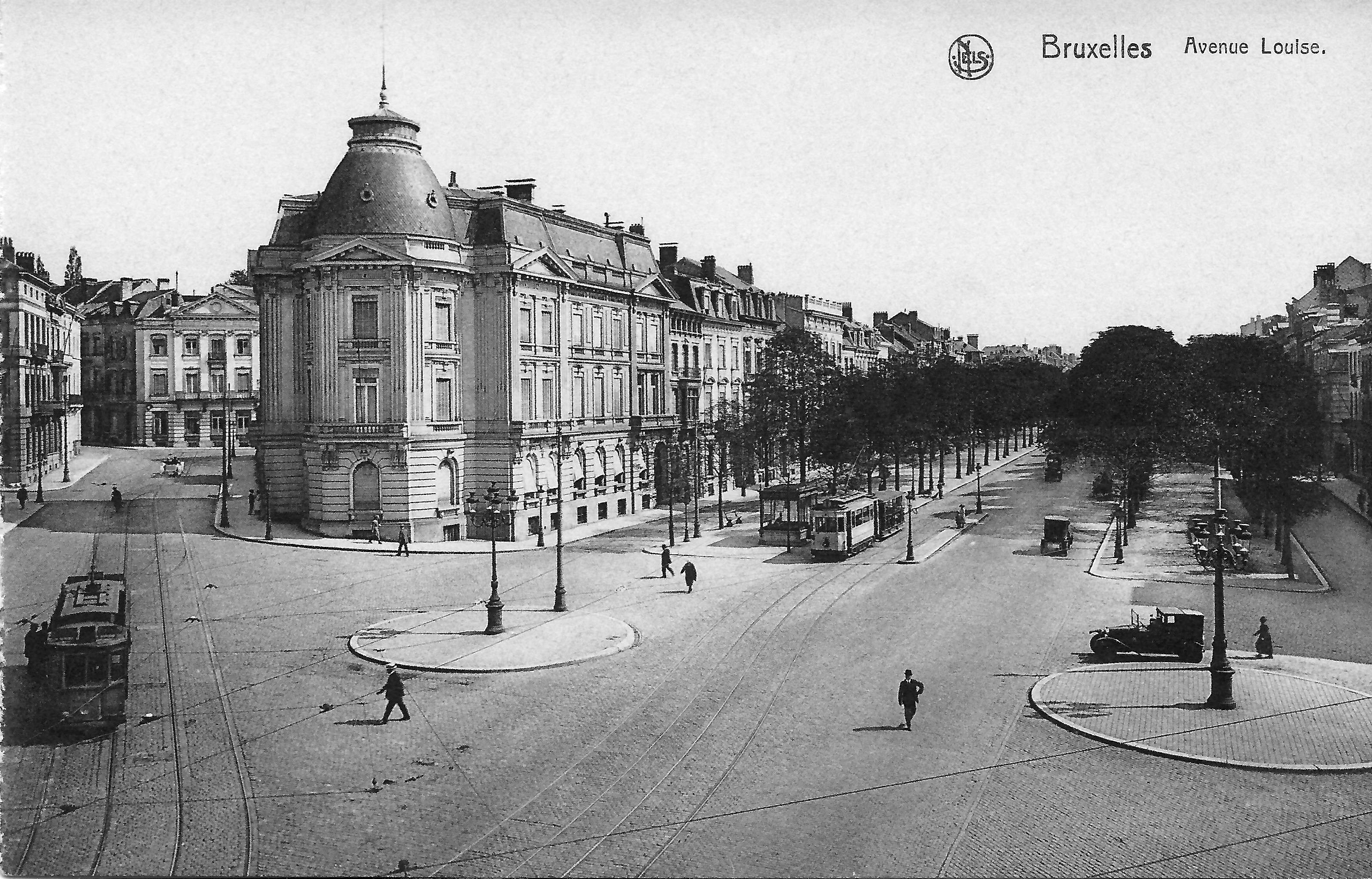
The Avenue Louise from the Place Stéphanie/Stefanieplein, c. 1920

Originally, fierce resistance to the project was put up by the towns of Saint-Gilles and Ixelles—then, as now, separate municipalities (local authorities) from the City of Brussels—through whose territories the avenue was to run. The Belgian Government had declared the project a public utility in 1844, and the private developer was granted a concession to start the project in 1851, but it failed to follow through, and by 1856, that concession was revoked. However, by 1859, the Government regranted the concession to the same developer, as long as the City of Brussels would carry out the construction. Development began soon after, with preliminary work on grading starting in June 1860.

After years of fruitless negotiations, the City of Brussels finally annexed the narrow band of land needed for the avenue, in addition to the Bois de la Cambre itself, in April 1864, and final plans for the part of the avenue south of the Louise bottleneck were formally approved in July 1864. That decision accounts for the unusual shape of today's City of Brussels and for the separation of Ixelles into two separate areas. The illogical layout of today's municipal boundary is also due to the fact that it was drawn long before urbanisation was completed. The boundary then followed the outline of old fields, paths and estates. The avenue was inaugurated in 1866. Nonetheless, it took another forty years, until 1905, for buildings to solidly line the avenue.

The avenue's name pays homage to both Queen Louise, the first Queen of the Belgians and wife of King Leopold I, and Princess Louise, King Leopold II's eldest daughter, as does the Place Louise/Louizaplein, a major square located in its upper part. This first name dates back to the construction of the bottleneck around 1840, a few years after the royal wedding between Queen Louise and Leopold I in 1832. This second name coincided with Princess Louise's birth in 1858, during the negotiations for the avenue's southward extension. The Place Stéphanie/Stefanieplein, another square on the avenue, is named in honour of her younger sister, Princess Stéphanie.

=== World War II ===
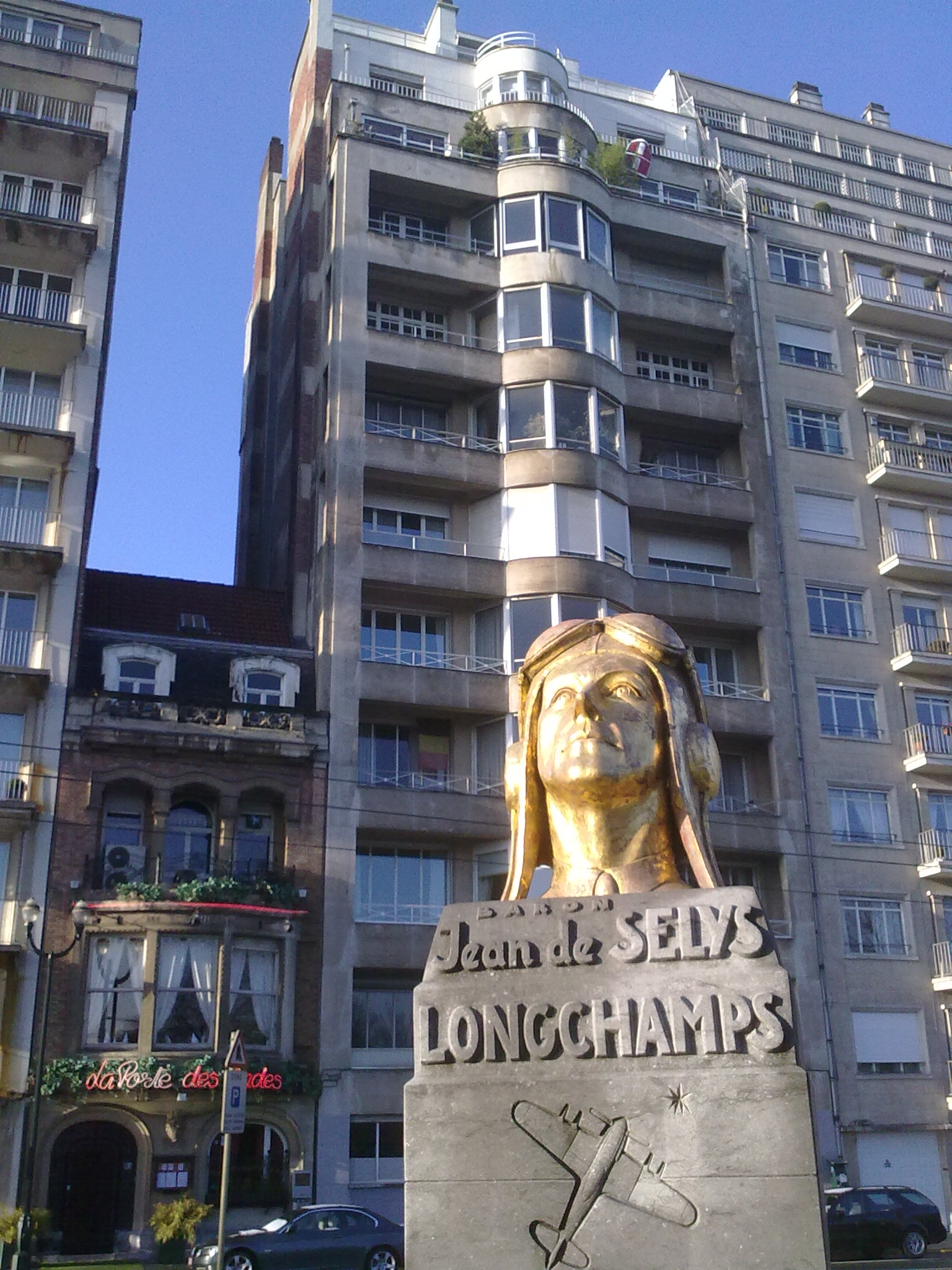
Bust of Jean de Sélys Longchamps in front of the Gestapo's former headquarters, at number 453

During World War II, following the German invasion of Belgium, Brussels was occupied by the German military. The Nazi security organisation, the Sicherheitspolizei-Sicherheitsdienst (Sipo-SD), of which the Gestapo was a part, set up their Brussels headquarters on the Avenue Louise. They occupied numbers 347, 418, 453 and 510; initially their headquarters were at number 453, in the Résidence Belvédère.

On 20 January 1943, Baron Jean de Sélys Longchamps, a Brussels-born fighter pilot in the Royal Air Force, mounted a solo attack on the headquarters at number 453. Benefitting from the wide avenues, and the large height of the apartment block relative to the neighbouring buildings, he flew his Hawker Typhoon at a low altitude straight towards the building, firing the plane's 20 mm cannons, before returning to England. Following this attack, the SD moved their headquarters to number 347. The cellars at this address were used to detain and interrogate captured members of the Belgian Resistance. The torture that took place there brought the Avenue Louise's name considerable infamy at the time. A monument to Baron de Selys Longchamps now stands in front of number 453.

=== Contemporary (1950–present) ===
The Avenue Louise was redeveloped after 1950 in preparation for the 1958 Brussels World's Fair (Expo 58), transforming it into an urban motorway (see Brusselisation) by tunnelling the main intersections and offering direct access to the Small Ring (Brussels' inner ring road). The northern part is sunken and has three tunnels—all housed in the central lane, which was widened by the removal of two rows of trees—with level crossings and car parking spaces aboveground. The three tunnels are, from north to south: the Stéphanie Tunnel, the Bailli Tunnel and the short Vleurgat Tunnel.

From the 1960s onwards, the Avenue Louise was gradually transformed into an office district. The first special development plan for the Avenue Louise, drawn up in 1970, merely acknowledged this transformation. Although it attempted to remedy the discrepancies in the avenue's silhouette, the plan made no pronouncement on the allocation of the buildings, giving free rein to land speculation. The 1970 plan also authorised the construction of towers on the avenue. High-rise buildings such as the Louise Tower (1965), the ITT Tower (1973) and the Blue Tower (1976) date from this period.

At the end of the 1990s, the JNC International SA office, as part of the chemin de la ville project, studied the redevelopment of public spaces on the Avenue Louise, with the installation of new sculptures and lighting, and the redesign of pavements and surface parking areas. In spite of this, much of the post-war configuration still exists today. It implies that no metro line runs through the avenue, despite its high built density and its multiple functions of shops/offices/housing, the latter being in a way replaced by these tunnels. However, tram lines 8 and 93 operate on their own site from the Place Stéphanie to the Woluwe depot.

The Avenue Louise is held to be a sought-after address for office space. With some 400,000 m^{2} (4,300,000 sq ft) of tertiary surfaces, it accounts for more than a fifth of the market in this sector in the Brussels Region. Luxury shops, restaurants, art galleries and antique dealers all contribute to the high-end reputation of the avenue. Although regarded as a prestigious street during the day, at night, however, it has a reputation for unauthorised prostitution.

== Landmarks ==
The Avenue Louise is home to many upmarket shops, restaurants and offices. From north to south, notable landmarks include:

- ~ Place Louise/Louizaplein, a crucial transportation nexus, including a tramway and metro station. The Law Courts of Brussels are located nearby.
- ~ Place Stéphanie/Stefanieplein, another extremely busy square surrounded by luxury shops. The tree-bordered part of the avenue begins there.
- No. 124: Louise Tower (1965), also known as the Generali Tower, one of the tallest office buildings in Brussels
- No. 224: Hôtel Solvay (1895–1900), a large Art Nouveau town house by Victor Horta, and a UNESCO World Heritage Site
- ~ Chaussée de Vleurgat/Vleurgatsteenweg (which leads downhill to the nearby Place Eugène Flagey/Eugène Flageyplein)
- No. 324–326: Blue Tower (1976), a functionalist office building by Henri Montois
- No. 346: Hôtel Max Hallet (1904), another Art Nouveau town house by Victor Horta
- ~ the scenic King's Garden (French: Jardin du Roi, Dutch: Hof van de Koning), a garden descending towards the nearby Ixelles Ponds
- ~ Olivier Strebelle's 16-tonne bronze sculpture Le Phénix 44 commemorating the anniversary of the liberation of Brussels, which stands athwart the roundabout at the King's Garden
- ~ Carrefour de Sélys Longchamps/De Sélis Longchampskruispunt, which features several statues, the entrance to La Cambre Abbey, and the massive ITT Tower (1973)
- ~ a roundabout flanked by two twin neoclassical former octroi pavilions (French: pavillons d'octroi) of the Namur Gate ending the avenue. Beyond it lies the Bois de la Cambre/Ter Kamerenbos.
- the nearby Pro-Cathedral of the Holy Trinity, part of the Church of England
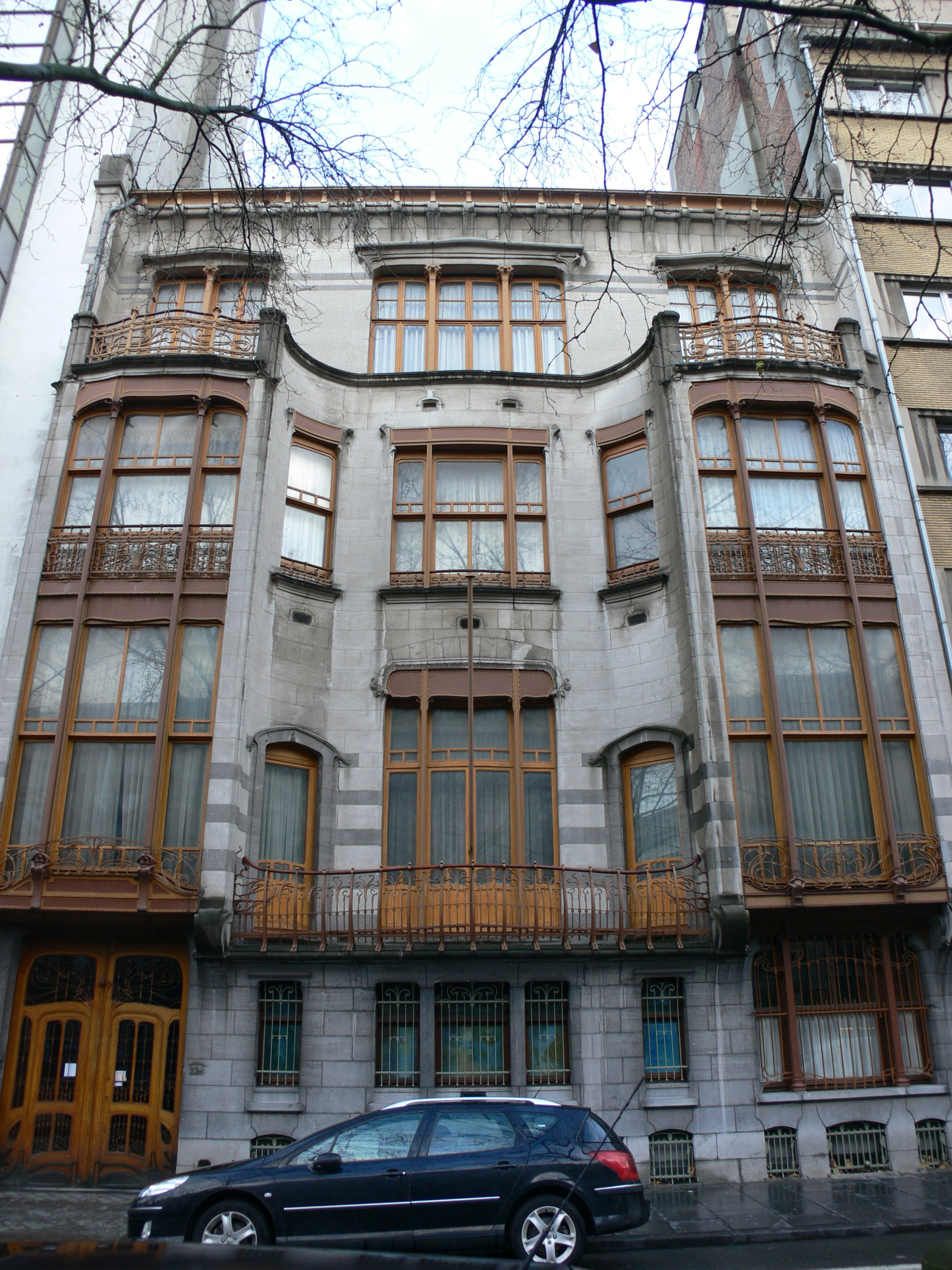
Hôtel Solvay (Horta, 1895–1900)

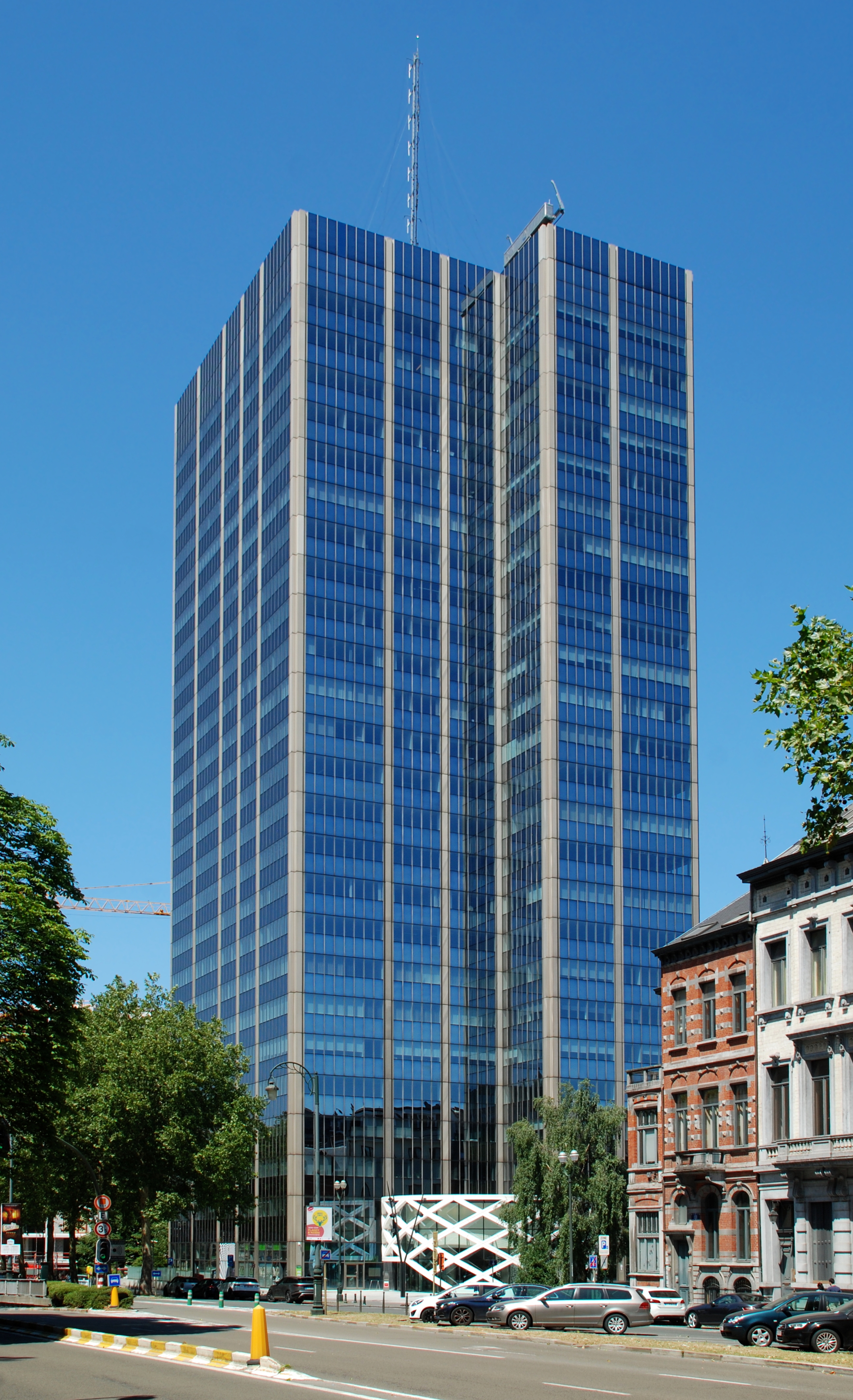
Blue Tower (Montois, 1976)

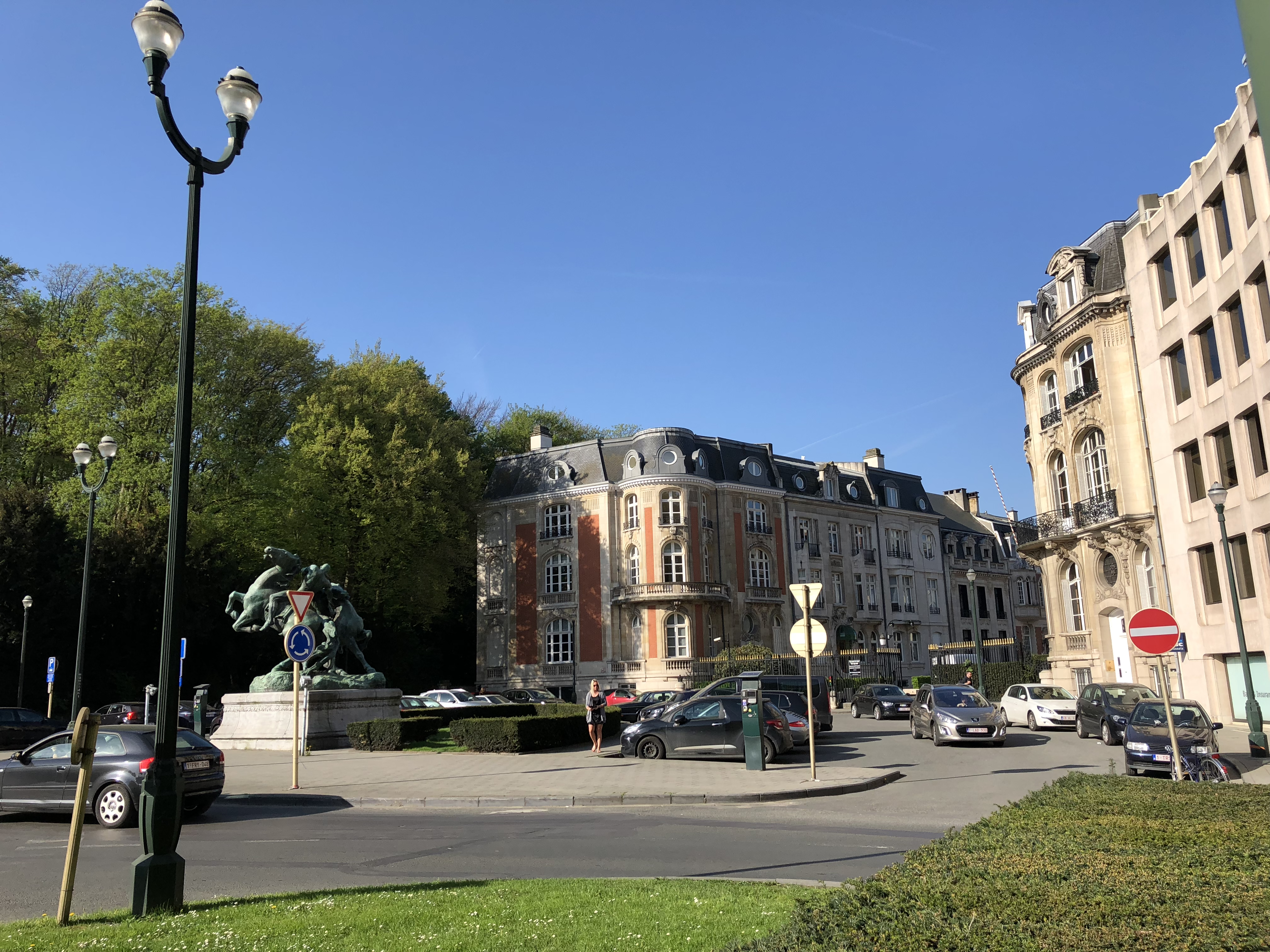
Entrance of the Square du Bois/Bossquare, Avenue Louise 535–587

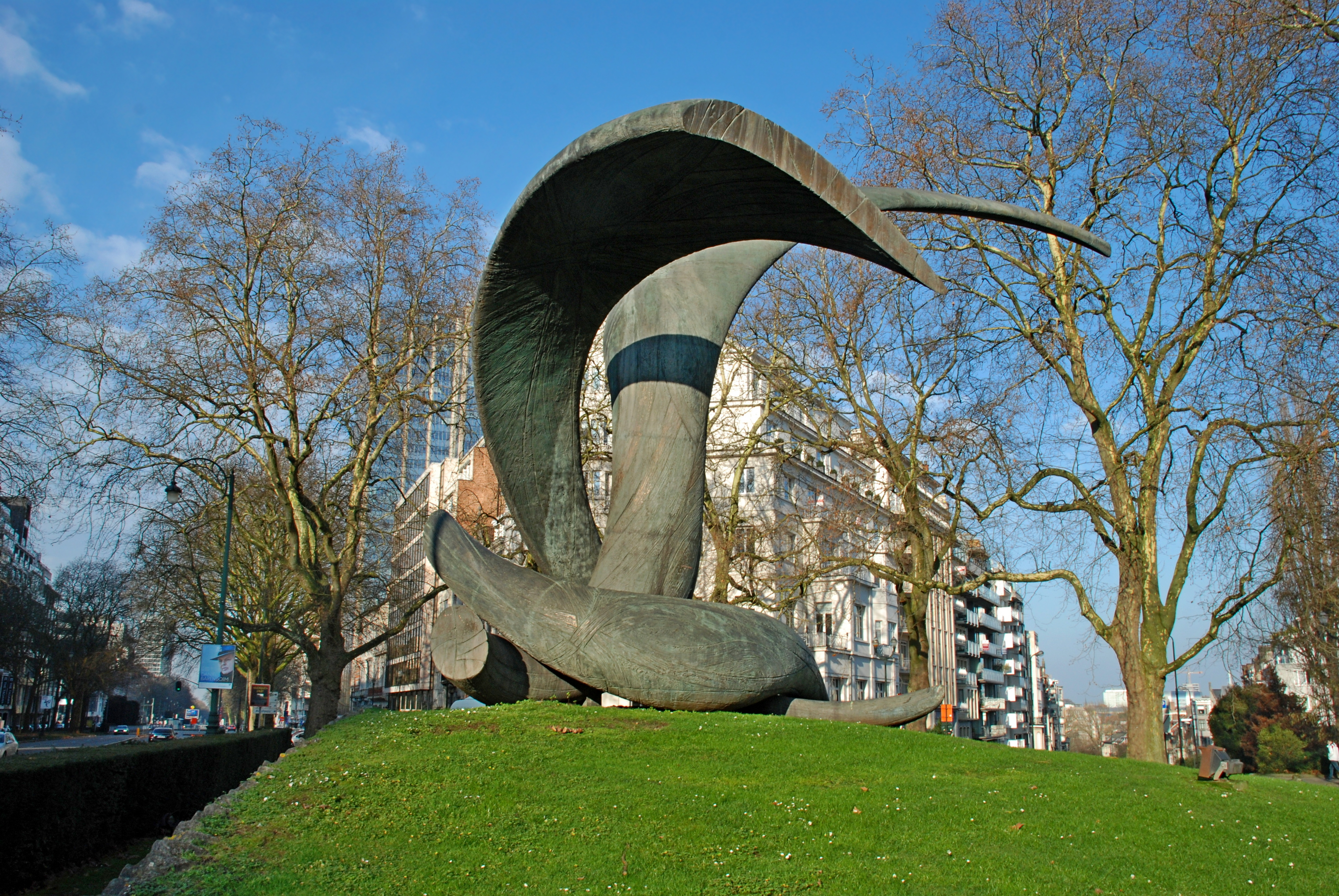
Le Phénix 44 (Strebelle, 1994)

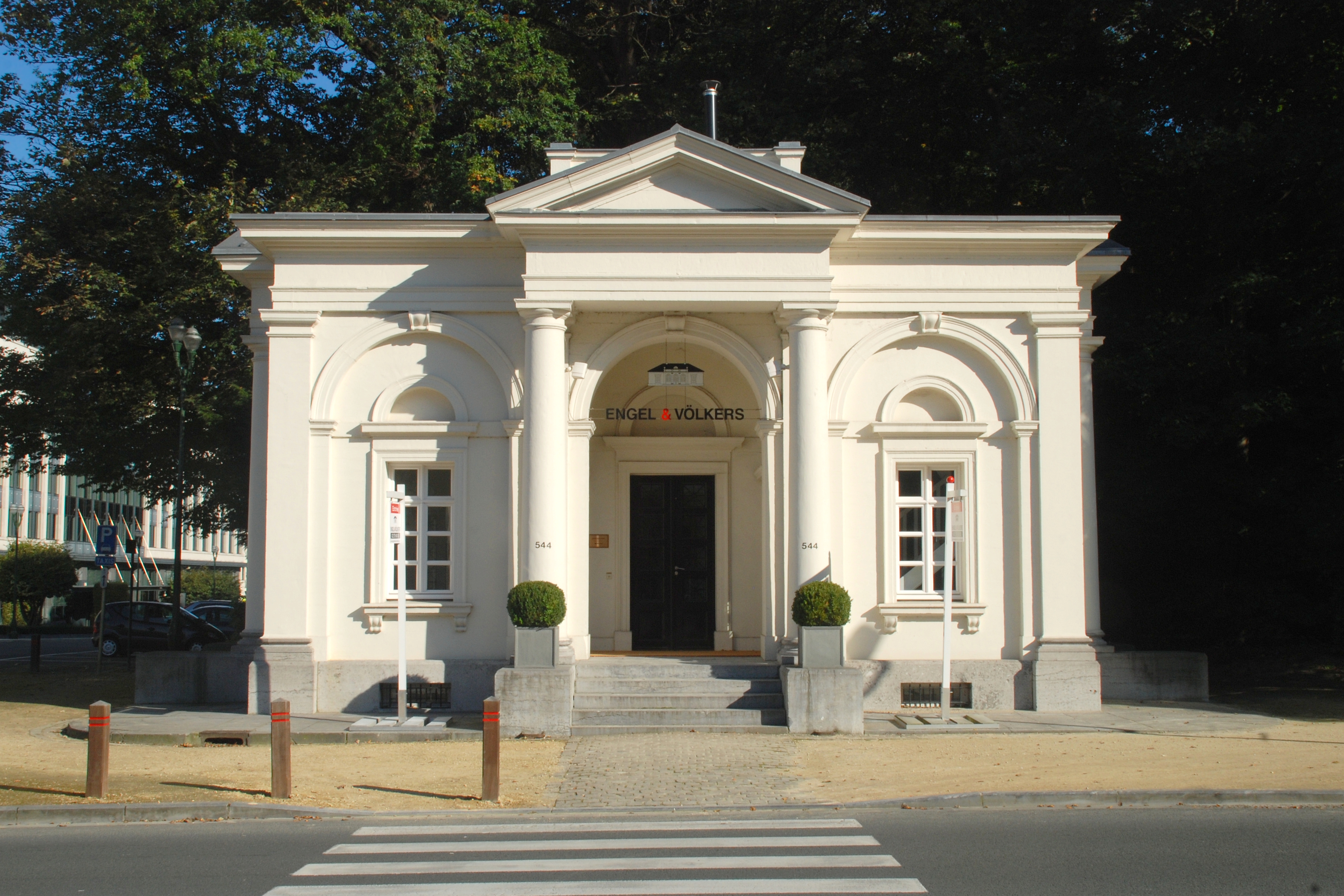
Former octroi pavilion at the entrance of the Bois de la Cambre/Ter Kamerenbos

== The "Louise bottleneck" ==
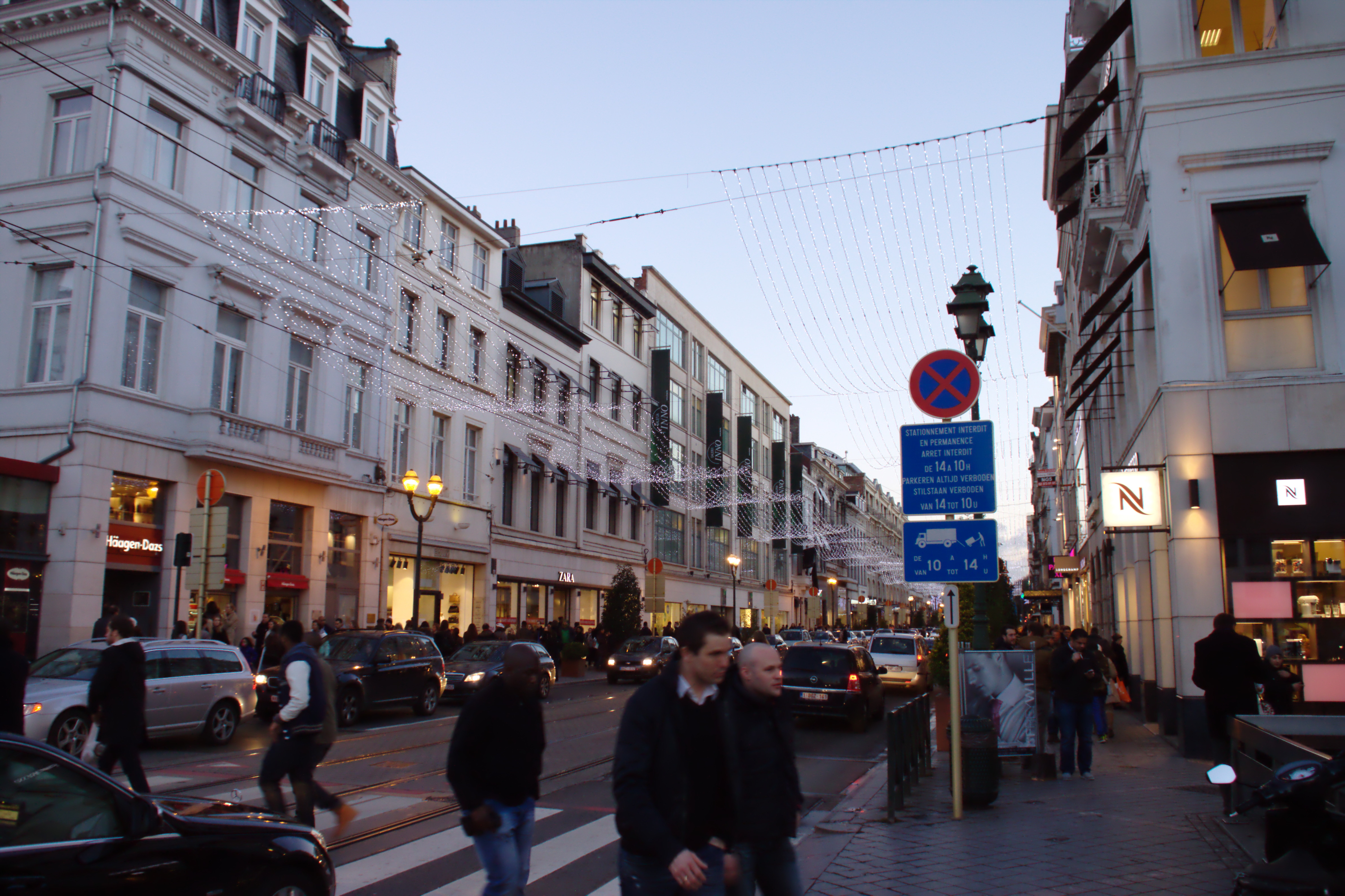
The "Louise bottleneck"

The 250-metre-long (820 ft) part of the Avenue Louise between the Place Louise/Louizaplein and the Place Stéphanie/Stefanieplein is called le goulet Louise in French ("the Louise bottleneck"). With two tramway lines and thousands of cars sharing this narrow segment of the avenue, large traffic jams occur during rush hours. The problem was already obvious in the early 1980s, so a tram tunnel under the bottleneck was built along with the metro station at the Place Louise. However, construction was abandoned toward its end due to protests of local businesses fearing losses if patrons were to be diverted through a tunnel.

The nearly-completed, vast tramway tunnel under the Louise bottleneck remains unused as of 2009. Various solutions to the traffic problem have been considered. One proposes pedestrianising the whole segment, with trams running on the surface and only delivery vehicles authorised at certain hours. Another, much more costly idea, involves finishing the tunnel and diverting all trams underground.

Tramway lines 8 and 93 run the entire length of the avenue, all on segregated track except in the short Louise bottleneck section.

== Embassies ==
The Avenue Louise houses many embassies, including those of:

- No. 130: Dominican Republic
- No. 176: Bolivia
- No. 181: Montenegro
- No. 225: Argentina
- No. 250: Bahrain
- No. 350: Brazil
- No. 363: Ecuador
- No. 379: Suriname
- No. 425: Croatia
- No. 475: Paraguay
- No. 489: Costa Rica

=== Representative Offices ===
- No. 284/286: Northern Cyprus

== See also ==
- List of streets in Brussels
- Neoclassical architecture in Belgium
- Art Nouveau in Brussels
- Art Deco in Brussels
- History of Brussels
- Belgium in the long nineteenth century
