= Lake Street station =

Lake Street Station may refer to the following places in the United States:

== Chicago, Illinois ==
- Lake station (CTA)
- Clark/Lake station
- State/Lake station

== Minneapolis, Minnesota ==
- Lake Street/Midtown station
- I-35W & Lake Street station

== Massachusetts ==
- Lake Street station (Arlington, Massachusetts)
- Lake Street station, now Boston College station

== See also ==
- East Lake station
- Lake Street (disambiguation)
