= Midtown, Minneapolis =

Minneapolis, Minnesota south region

Coordinates: 44°56′54″N 93°15′23″W

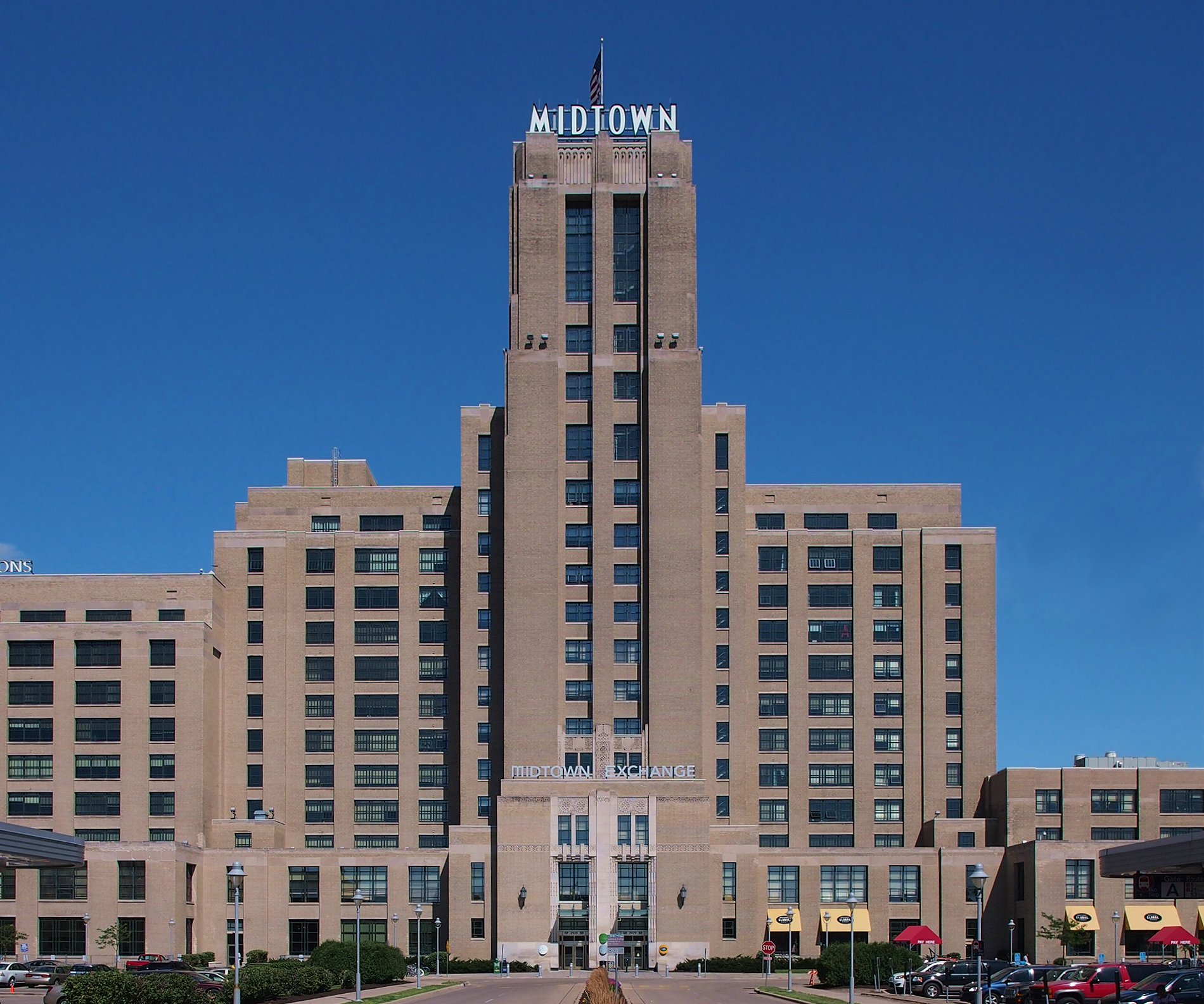
Midtown Exchange

Midtown is a loosely defined region in south Minneapolis, Minnesota, United States. There are no hard-set boundaries to the midtown area, but it is generally agreed to include the area in the vicinity of Lake Street between Interstate 35W and Hiawatha Avenue. Lake Street is the border between the Phillips and Powderhorn communities of Minneapolis. Lake Street/Midtown LRT Station, with service on the METRO Blue Line, is located on the eastern edge of the area.

== History ==
The midtown area was historically known as a run-down area. However, in the past decade or two, there has been a large revitalization effort along Lake Street, driven largely by an insurgence of new Latino and Northeast African businesses.

Near the intersection of Chicago Avenue and Lake Street is the Midtown Exchange building, which was a Sears department store and mail-order catalog facility until the company closed it in 1994. After sitting vacant for a decade, the building was fully redeveloped into a mixed-use commercial and residential space, housing the Midtown Global Market, a large marketplace with shops and restaurants.

Other indoor markets that have opened in the midtown area include the Mercado Central (at Bloomington Ave and Lake St), which houses numerous Latino businesses, and the Lake Plaza (at 3rd Ave and Lake St), which houses Somali and Latino businesses. As of January 2009, a new market has opened in the former True Value Hardware site at the Hi-Lake Shopping Center (21st Ave and Lake St), housing Somali businesses.

== Place names ==
Many places and groups use the "midtown" descriptor in their names. Examples include:

- The Midtown Greenway, a major bicycling and walking trail paralleling Lake Street
- The Midtown Exchange and the Midtown Global Market
- The Midtown Freewheel Bike Center, a bike shop on the Midtown Greenway
- The Midtown YWCA (Lake Street and 22nd Ave)
- The Lake Street/Midtown light rail station on the METRO Blue Line
- The Sheraton Minneapolis Midtown Hotel
- The Midtown Church Project, a church plant utilizing principles of self-organization and community development
- The Midtown Farmers' Market, operating Tuesdays and Saturdays at 22nd Ave and Lake Street, in the parking lot of Anishinabe Academy School
