= Lake Street =

Lake Street may refer to:

- Lake Street (Chicago)
- Lake Street (Minneapolis)

== See also ==
- Lake Street station (disambiguation)
