= Mississippi River bridge collapse =

Mississippi River bridge collapse may refer to:

- The collapse of the I-35W Mississippi River bridge in 2007
- The collapse of a section of the Lake Street-Marshall Bridge in 1989
