= 38th Street station (Metro Transit) =

Light rail station in Minneapolis, Minnesota

38th Street
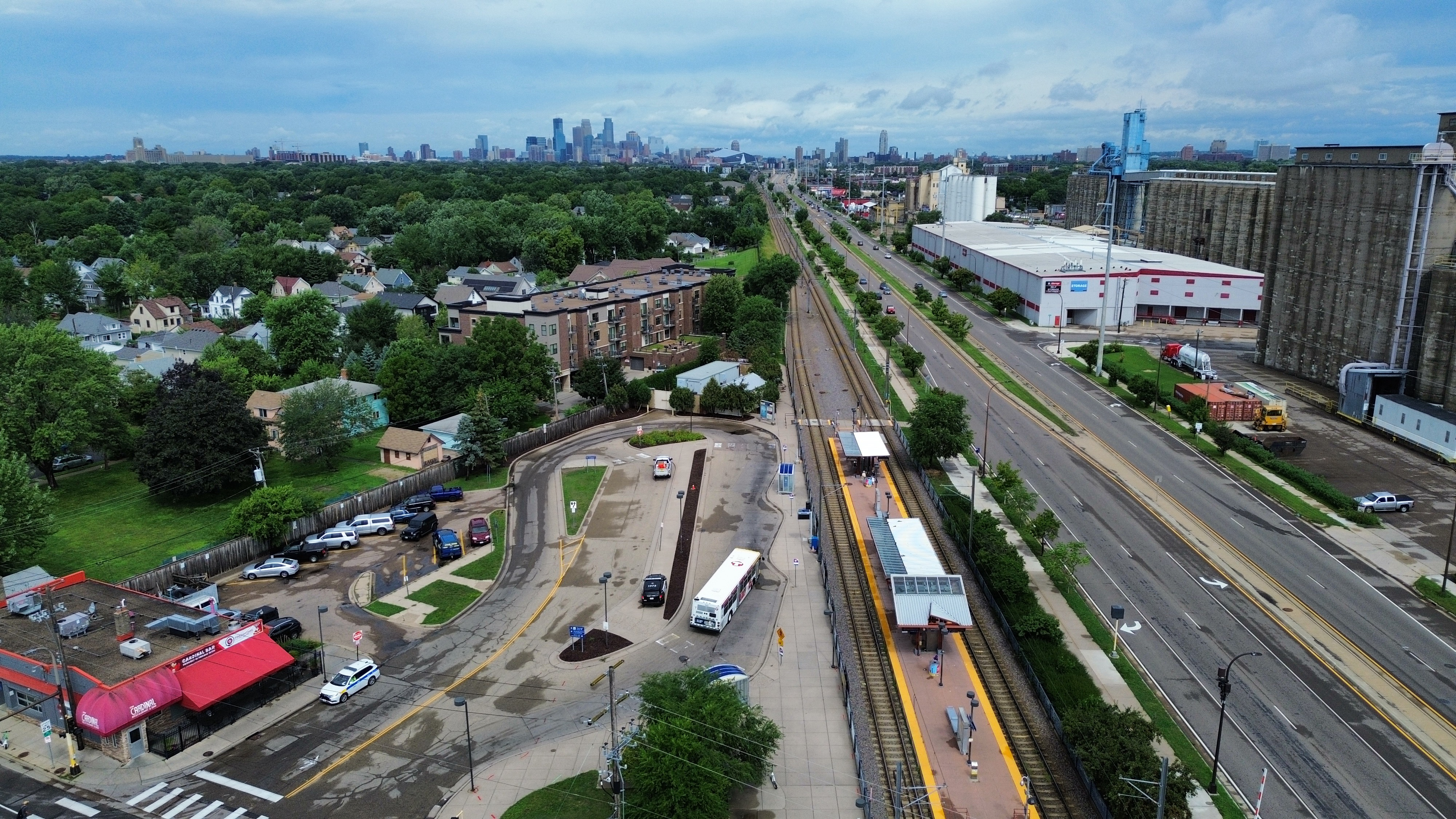
- A METRO Blue Line train stops northbound towards downtown Minneapolis at 38th Street Station in 2025

General information
- Location: 2902 38th Street East; Minneapolis, Minnesota
- Coordinates: 44°56′05″N 93°13′46″W
- Owner: Metro Transit
- Platforms: 1 island platform
- Tracks: 2
- Connections: Metro Transit: 14, 22, 38

Construction
- Structure type: At-grade
- Accessible: Yes

History
- Opened: June 26, 2004

Passengers
- 2025: 768 daily ▼0.4%
- Rank: 23 out of 37

Services
Preceding station	Metro	Following station
Lake Street/Midtown toward Target Field	Blue Line	46th Street toward Mall of America
Location

38th Street station is a light rail station on the Blue Line in Minneapolis, Minnesota.

This station is located at the intersection of 38th Street and Minnesota State Highway 55 (Hiawatha Avenue), in Minneapolis. This is a center-platform station. Service began at this station when the Blue Line opened on June 26, 2004.

The city of Minneapolis has a station area plan to guide development in the area. The initial plan was adopted in 2006.

== Bus connections ==
From 38th Street Station, there are direct bus connections to Metro Transit routes 14, 22, and 38. Starting June 14th, 2025, Route 23 would be replaced with Route 38.

== Station changes since opening ==
Metro Transit proposed building secure, covered bike storage for 53 bicycles in 2016. The structure would have required a Go-To Card to operate.

Metro Transit applied for federal grant money to modernize the station and build a transit-oriented development. The project would modify nearby intersections and stop lights to improve transit operations. The grant application was successful in 2022.

== Art at station and in popular culture ==
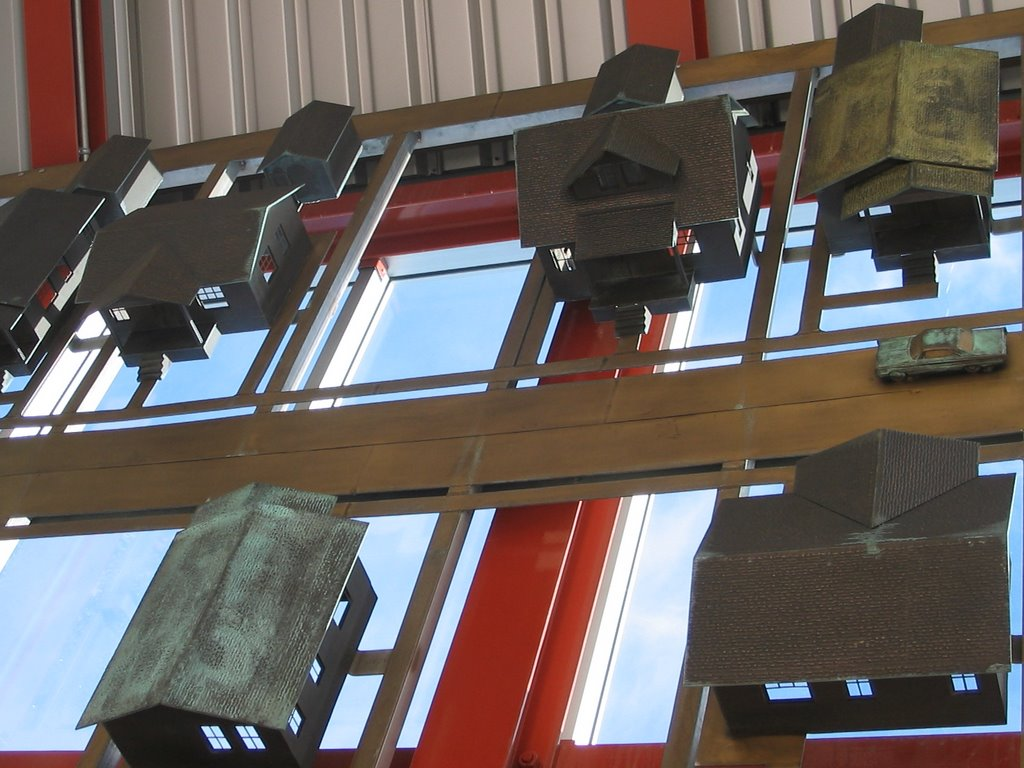
Sears catalog kit homes inside the shelter on the station's platform.

The interior of the shelters on the station platform have bronze miniatures of Sears Catalog kit houses. The adjacent neighborhoods have many bungalow houses built around the era of Sears Catalog kit houses.

The announcer for this station can be heard on the opening of "Arthur's Song" by Atmosphere on the album Southsiders.

== Notable places nearby ==
- Corcoran, Howe, Longfellow and Standish neighborhoods
- Hiawatha LRT Trail
- Roosevelt High School
- Roosevelt Community Library
