= Midtown Farmers' Market =

Coordinates: 44°56′52.84″N 93°14′23.02″W

Tents at the market

The Midtown Farmers Market is a seasonal open-air farmers market in the Midtown area of south Minneapolis. Established in 2003, the market is held Saturdays from May through October, and Tuesdays from June through October in a parking lot in the Corcoran neighborhood. The market is a project of the Corcoran Neighborhood Organization, and is known for a selection of locally produced and organic fare. All of the products sold at the market are grown or produced in Minnesota or Wisconsin by the individual vendors. At the peak of the season, the Saturday market hosts over 70 vendors and draws over 60,000 shoppers each season.

In addition to the usual cash, shoppers can also pay using credit cards or EBT (food stamp) cards. Customers wishing to use these alternative forms of payment use credit card processing machines at a central booth to buy wooden tokens, which can be spent as cash throughout the market. The Midtown Farmers Market was the first in Minnesota to offer an EBT payment option.

== Mission ==
The mission of the Midtown Farmers Market is to create a forum in south Minneapolis that connects residents and nearby rural food producers in a mutually beneficial economic and cultural exchange.

== History and location ==
Since 2003, the Midtown Farmers Market (MFM) has connected locally produced food and goods with 40,000 customers per season at 2225 East Lake Street on a surface parking lot owned by Minneapolis Public Schools (MPS). The Midtown Farmers Market was conceived by local residents and is operated by the Corcoran Neighborhood Organization (CNO). The Midtown Farmers Market was a key element of the Corcoran Midtown Revival Plan. The MFM currently operates one day a week from May to June, and two days a week from June through October.

The market site offers parking and bicycle racks. The Lake Street Station of the METRO Blue Line is immediately adjacent to the market site, and several Metro Transit bus routes stop near the site.

The market was awarded the title of "Best Farmers Market" by City Pages in 2004.

== Preserving the Midtown Farmers Market ==
The Midtown Farmers Market was a key element of the Corcoran Midtown Revival Plan, which called for a mix of housing, retail/office, structured/underground parking, and public open space. This citizen-generated Plan was adopted by the City Council as part of the Minneapolis Plan in 2002.

Given development pressures and the pending sale of the 6 1/2-acre site by the school district, residents look forward to the opportunity to realize the Plan and create a permanent home for the Midtown Farmers Market at 2225 East Lake on a public square, plaza, or mall shared within a larger mixed-use, transit oriented development adjacent to the Lake Street LRT station, with nearby connections to the Midtown Greenway bikeway, bus transit, and a proposed Midtown Greenway trolley line.

The Midtown Farmers Market is secure at 2225 East Lake Street—its home of 7 seasons—and will be part of the future redevelopment of the site. This was the message from Mark Bollinger, executive director of facilities for Minneapolis Public Schools (MPS), when he attended the April 19, 2010, meeting of Corcoran's Land Use and Transportation and Housing committees. MPS owns the building and 6-1/2-acre site and is currently preparing a request for proposals (RFP) for its sale and redevelopment.
