= Midtown Exchange =

- Sears, Roebuck and Company Mail-Order Warehouse and Retail Store
- U.S. National Register of Historic Places
- Minneapolis Landmark
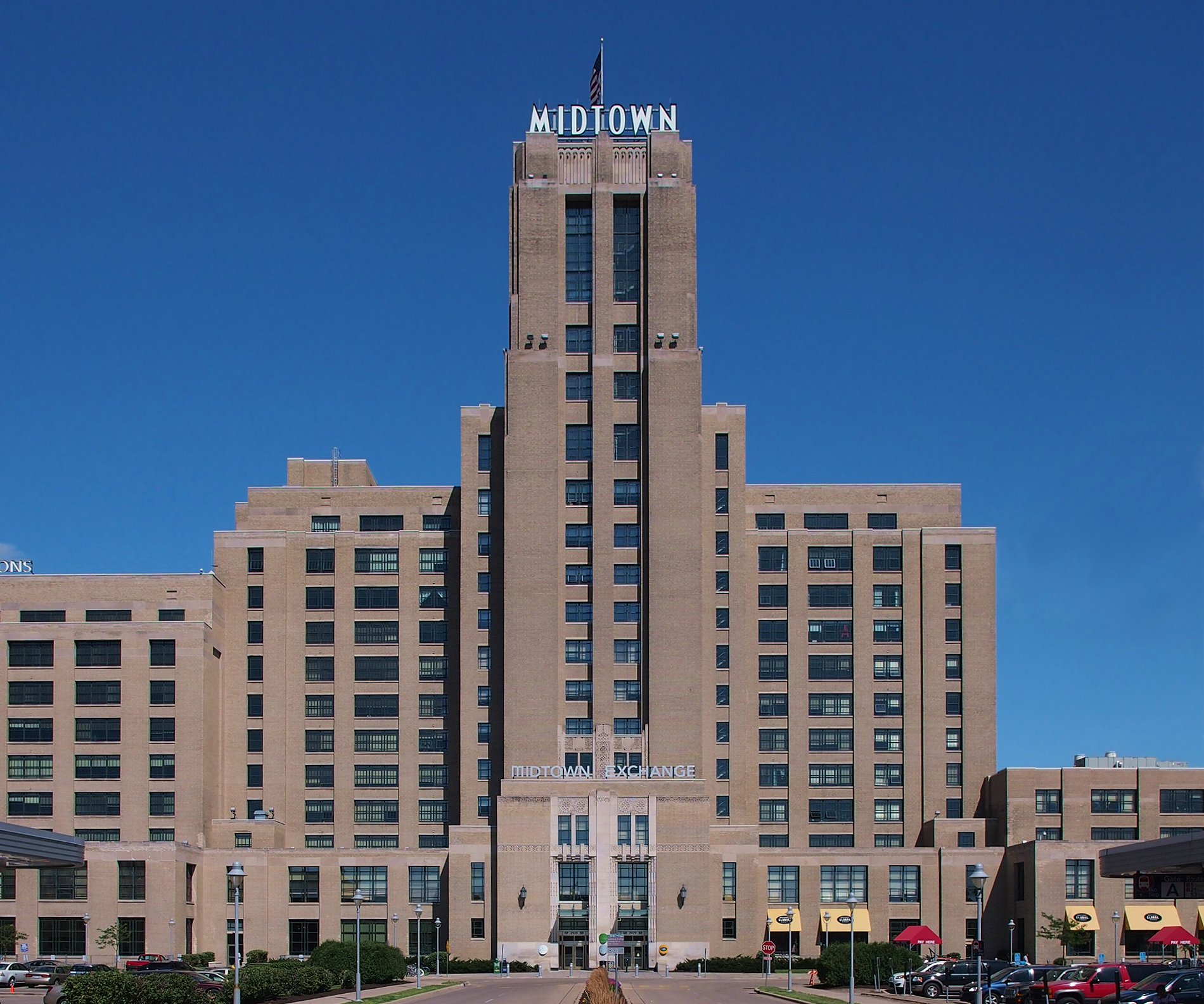
- The Midtown Exchange from the west
- Location: 2929 Chicago Avenue South, Minneapolis, Minnesota
- Coordinates: 44°56′58″N 93°15′38″W
- Built: 1927
- Architect: George C. Nimmons and Company
- Architectural style: Moderne / Art Deco
- NRHP reference No.: 05000745

Significant dates
- Added to NRHP: July 29, 2005
- Designated MPLSL: 2005

The Midtown Exchange is a historic structure and mixed-use building located in the Midtown neighborhood of Minneapolis, Minnesota, United States. It is the second-largest building in Minnesota in terms of leasable space, after the Mall of America. It was built in 1928 as a retail and mail-order catalog facility for Sears, which occupied it until 1994. It lay vacant until 2005, when it was transformed into multipurpose commercial space. The building is listed on the National Register of Historic Places as the Sears, Roebuck and Company Mail-Order Warehouse and Retail Store.

== History ==
The first phase of the building, along Elliot Avenue and Lake Street, was built in 1928. It was expanded in 1929, 1964, and 1979, resulting in 1.2 million square feet (110,000 m²) of space. A central tower along Elliot Avenue rises 16 floors to 211 feet (64 m).

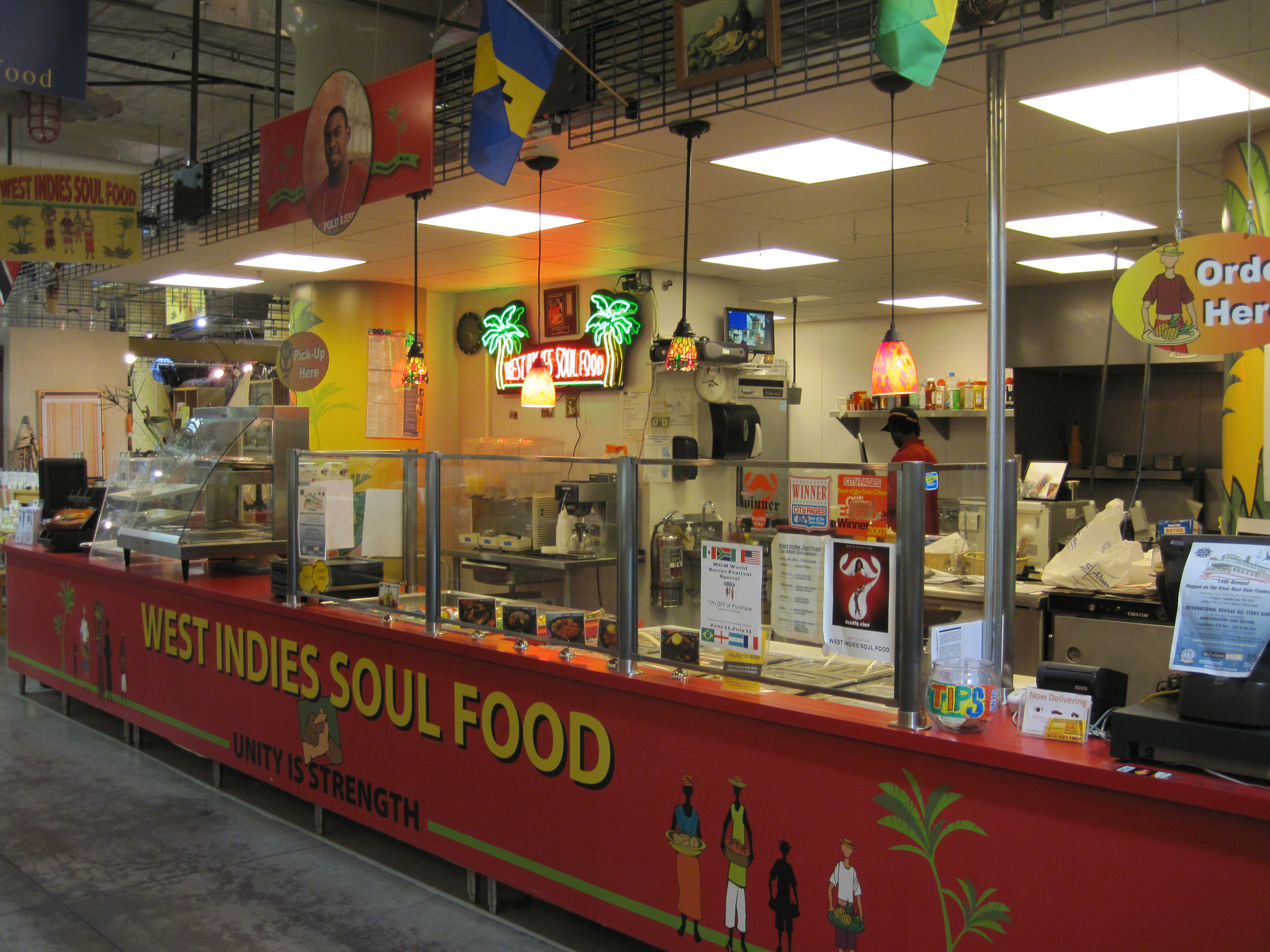
Midtown Global Market

After Sears closed the site in 1994, it laid vacant as development proposals came and went. The city of Minneapolis acquired the site in 2001 and sold the 1979 expansion portion in 2002 to be used by the neighboring Abbott Northwestern Hospital as a parking ramp. Two years later, Ryan Companies was given exclusive development rights to the site. The resulting plan divided the structure into a mixed-use site with about 300 residential units, plus office and retail space.

In 2004, Allina Health announced plans to move their corporate headquarters to the building, taking up most of the allotted office space. Much of the residential space is known as the Chicago Lofts located on floors 9-16 and Midtown Exchange Apartments located on floors 2-8. The building also includes the Midtown Global Market, which is home to a variety of small independently owned restaurants, cafes, and specialty grocers, and hosts community programs including music, dance, and children's activities. A prototype Sheraton Hotel was built in the former Sears parking lot. The building and hotel have direct access to the Midtown Greenway.

The area around the Midtown Exchange building was heavily affected by civil disorder during the George Floyd protests in Minneapolis–Saint Paul that began in late May 2020, with several nearby buildings entirely destroyed by arson. Residents of the Midtown Exchange fended off threats to the building from rioting and looting by patrolling the area with baseball bats. The Sheraton Hotel was used as a temporary sanctuary by activists for unhoused persons, but they were later evicted after several safety incidents, and the hotel remains shuttered as of July 2021.

== Other buildings ==
Midtown Exchange has a sister building called the Landmark Center in Boston, Massachusetts. Both were built in the 1920s and their designs are nearly identical. Both are former Sears warehouses that have since been renovated into commercial space.

Other adaptively reused Sears warehouses include those in Atlanta (1925), Chicago (1906), Dallas (1910), North Kansas City (1913), and Seattle (1912). Similar sites under construction include the 1927 Sears Mail Order Building in Los Angeles and the Crosstown Concourse (1927) in Memphis.

Similar Sears warehouses existed in Philadelphia (1919) and Kansas City (1925) but were demolished in 1994 and 1997.

== See also ==
- 2020 Minneapolis park encampments
- History of Minneapolis
- Lake Street (Minneapolis)
