= Lyn-Lake =

Commercial district in Minneapolis

Coordinates: 44.9483632°N 93.2906447°W

- Commercial District
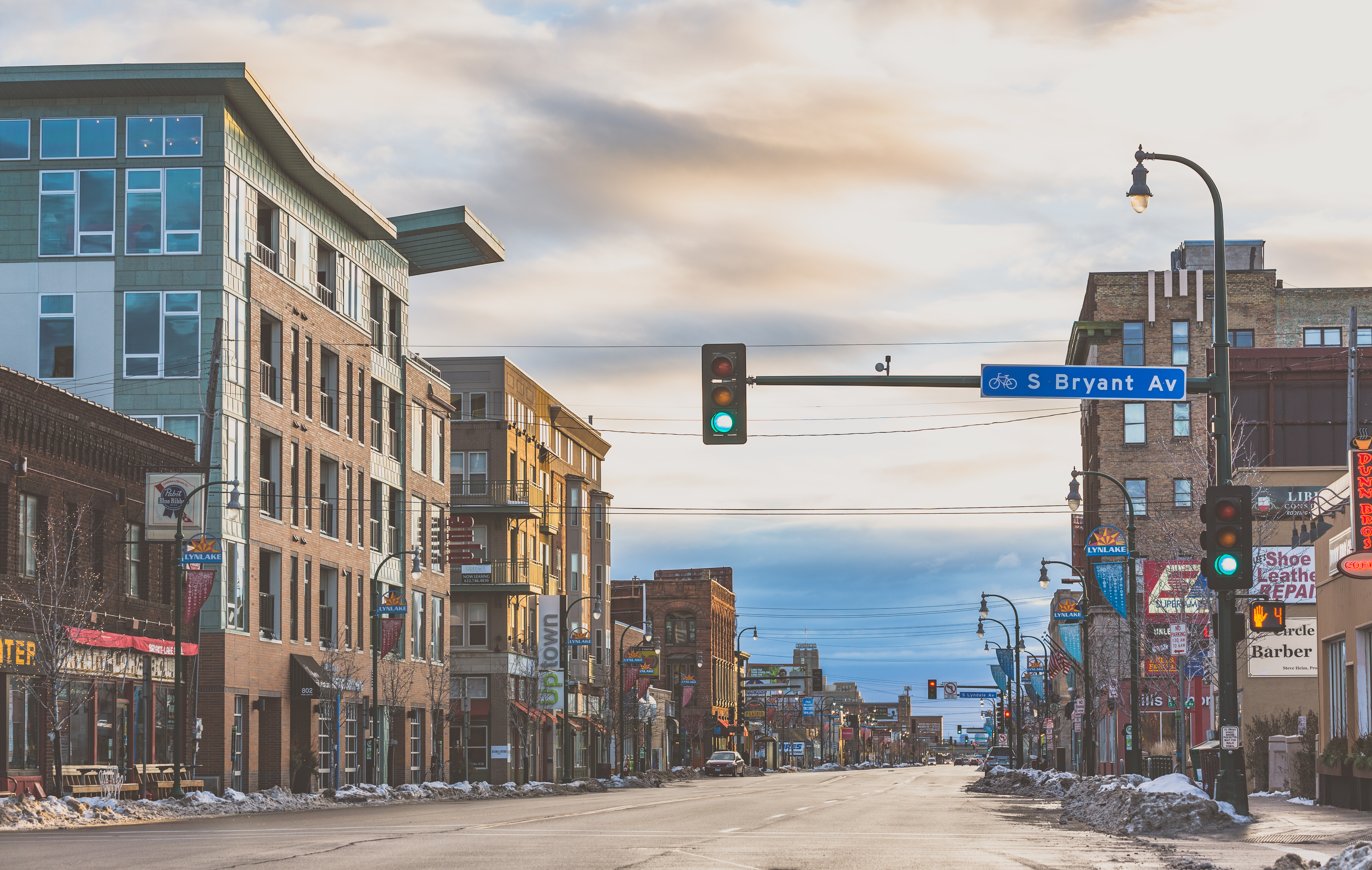
- Looking eastward on West Lake Street at Bryant Avenue South, 2016
- Interactive map of Lyn-Lake
- Country: United States
- State: Minnesota
- County: Hennepin
- City: Minneapolis
- Established: 1999
- Time zone: UTC-6 (CST)
  - Summer (DST): UTC-5 (CDT)
- ZIP code: 55408
- Area code: 612

Lyn-Lake is a commercial district in Minneapolis centered at the intersection of West Lake Street and Lyndale Avenue from which it takes its name. The street intersection is the boundary for four official neighborhoods: Whittier on the northeast, Lyndale on the southeast, South Uptown on the southwest, and Lowry Hill East on the northwest. The Lyn-Lake Business Association branded the unofficial commercial district as "Lyn-Lake" in 1999.

== Description ==
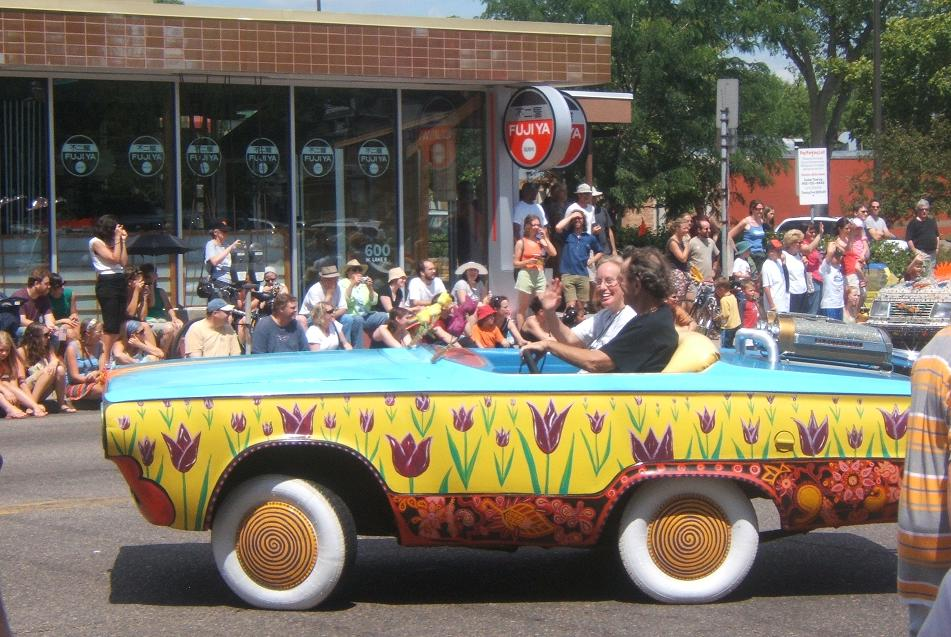
Art Car Parade, 2006

Most residents who consider themselves part of the "Lyn-Lake neighborhood" originate from the southeast corner of the Lyndale neighborhood. Locally, Lyn-Lake is mostly known as being just east of the Uptown district of Minneapolis and previously considered an extension of Uptown. One of the oldest anchors was the It's Greek to Me restaurant on the northeast corner. The district contains ethnic restaurants, LGBT establishments, and niche retail. North of Lyn-Lake is the Midtown Greenway bicycle and pedestrian path. Regional access by car is through I-35W from the east and I-94 from the north.

Open Streets Minneapolis and the Lyn Lake Street Festival are the signature events for the area and draw over 20,000 from the local community annually.

The Lyndale Ave and Lake Street intersection has the highest number of pedestrian crashes in Minneapolis over a ten year period. A large portion of the pedestrian crashes happen at night. The intersection will have stations on the Metro B Line. The stations were originally going to be placed on Lake Street at the near side of Lyndale Ave, but a later change in plans moved the stations to be located far side, at the northwest and southeast corners of the intersection.
