= Lake Street (Minneapolis) =

Street in Minneapolis, Minnesota

Coordinates: 44°56′54.2″N 93°13′46″W

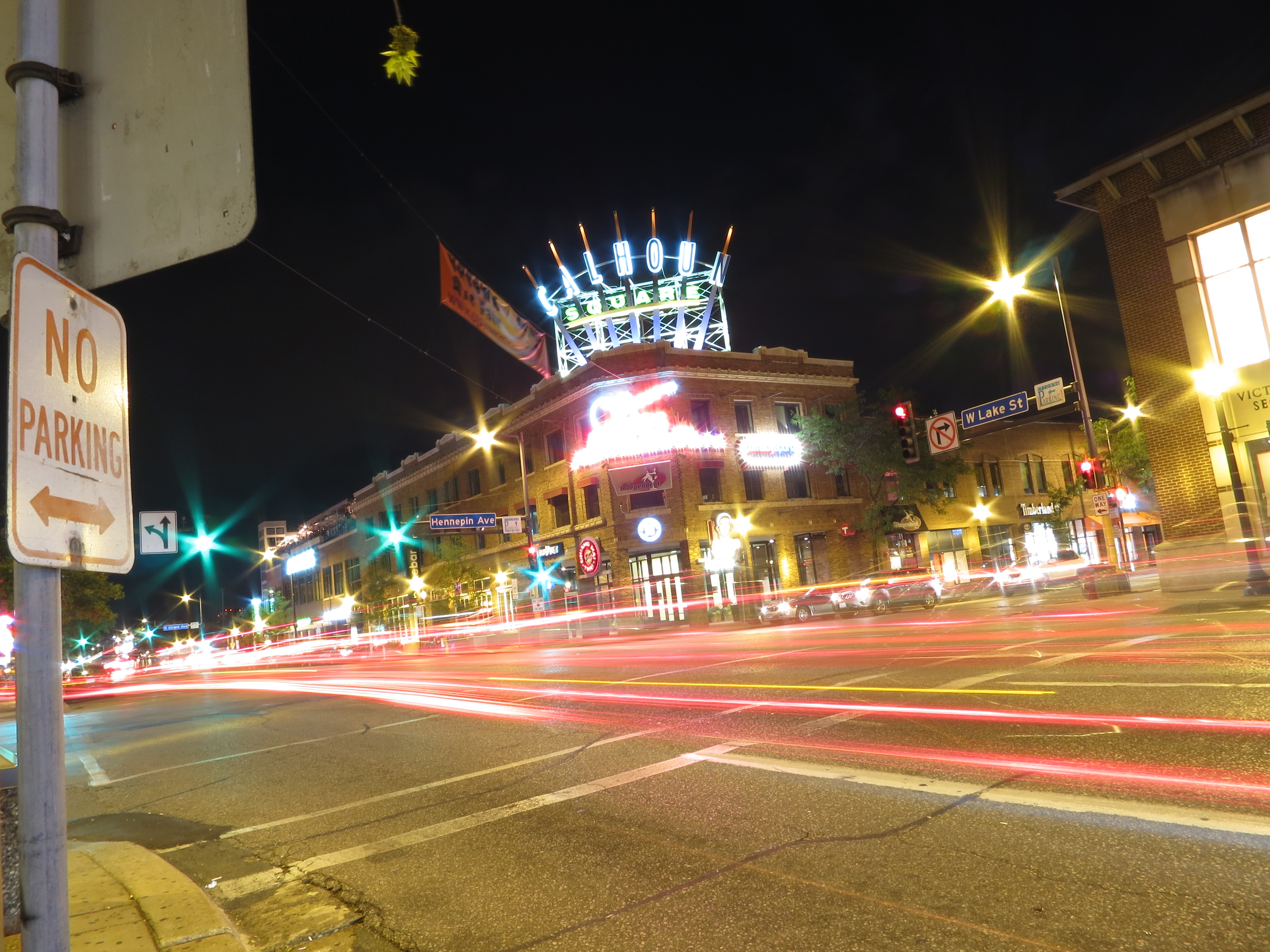
- West Lake Street in 2012
- Part of: East Lake Street cultural district
- Namesake: Chain of Lakes
- Type: Urban street
- Owner: City of Minneapolis
- Location: Minneapolis, Minnesota, United States
- Nearest metro station: Blue Line; Lake Street/Midtown station
- Major junctions: I-35W, Exit 15
- East: Mississippi River
- West: Saint Louis Park

Other
- Website: minneapolismn.gov

Lake Street is a major east-west thoroughfare between 29th and 31st streets in Minneapolis, Minnesota, United States. From its western end at the city's limits, Lake Street reaches the Chain of Lakes, passing over a small channel linking Bde Maka Ska and Lake of the Isles, and at its eastern end it reaches the Mississippi River. In May 2020, the Lake Street corridor suffered extensive damage during local unrest following the murder of George Floyd. In August of the same year, city officials designated East Lake Street as one of seven cultural districts to promote racial equity, preserve cultural identity, and promote economic growth.

== Connection to other cities ==
West of the city limits, Lake Street is coextensive with Minnetonka Boulevard running nearly a mile into St. Louis Park and then separates from Minnetonka Boulevard (which continues westward all the way through St. Louis Park) and runs diagonally southwestward. In the Uptown commercial district, the road is one-way and paired with Lagoon Avenue one block to the north to improve traffic flow. The street runs eastward past Interstate 35W and State Highway 55 (Hiawatha Avenue) to the Mississippi River where it crosses the Lake Street-Marshall Bridge into St. Paul and becomes Marshall Avenue.

== Boundaries and neighborhoods ==
Lake Street has historically and, in the late 20th century, become the official boundary of several Minneapolis neighborhoods. From west to east these include: Cedar-Isles-Dean, East Isles, East Calhoun, Lowry Hill East, South Uptown, Whittier, Lyndale, Central, Phillips West, Midtown, Powderhorn Park, East Phillips, Corcoran and Longfellow.

Informal commercial districts begin at the Bde Maka Ska area which marks the end of West Lake Street, followed by Uptown, and then by Lyn-Lake. These areas generally have high property values and fairly high density. In the early 20th century this was one of the busiest areas outside of downtown as the streetcars headed west to Lake Minnetonka. Today they are among the most popular entertainment and nightlife areas in South Minneapolis, and the site of rapid condominium development in recent years.

The section of Lake Street stretching from Interstate 35W to Hiawatha Avenue has been in the past known for crime, prostitution, and drugs, especially in the late 1980s and early '90s. The street marks the southern boundary of the Phillips neighborhood, which was plagued with violence during that time. However, there has been reinvestment in the corridor, as most of this section of the corridor was branded with the Midtown neighborhood name. East Lake Street continues to undergo massive refitting to help reduce crime, boost property values, and attract more shoppers. Improvements to the area brought concerns for the many immigrant business and property owners on the street who are being assessed for the new sidewalks and street paving. Non-positive gentrification was also a concern.

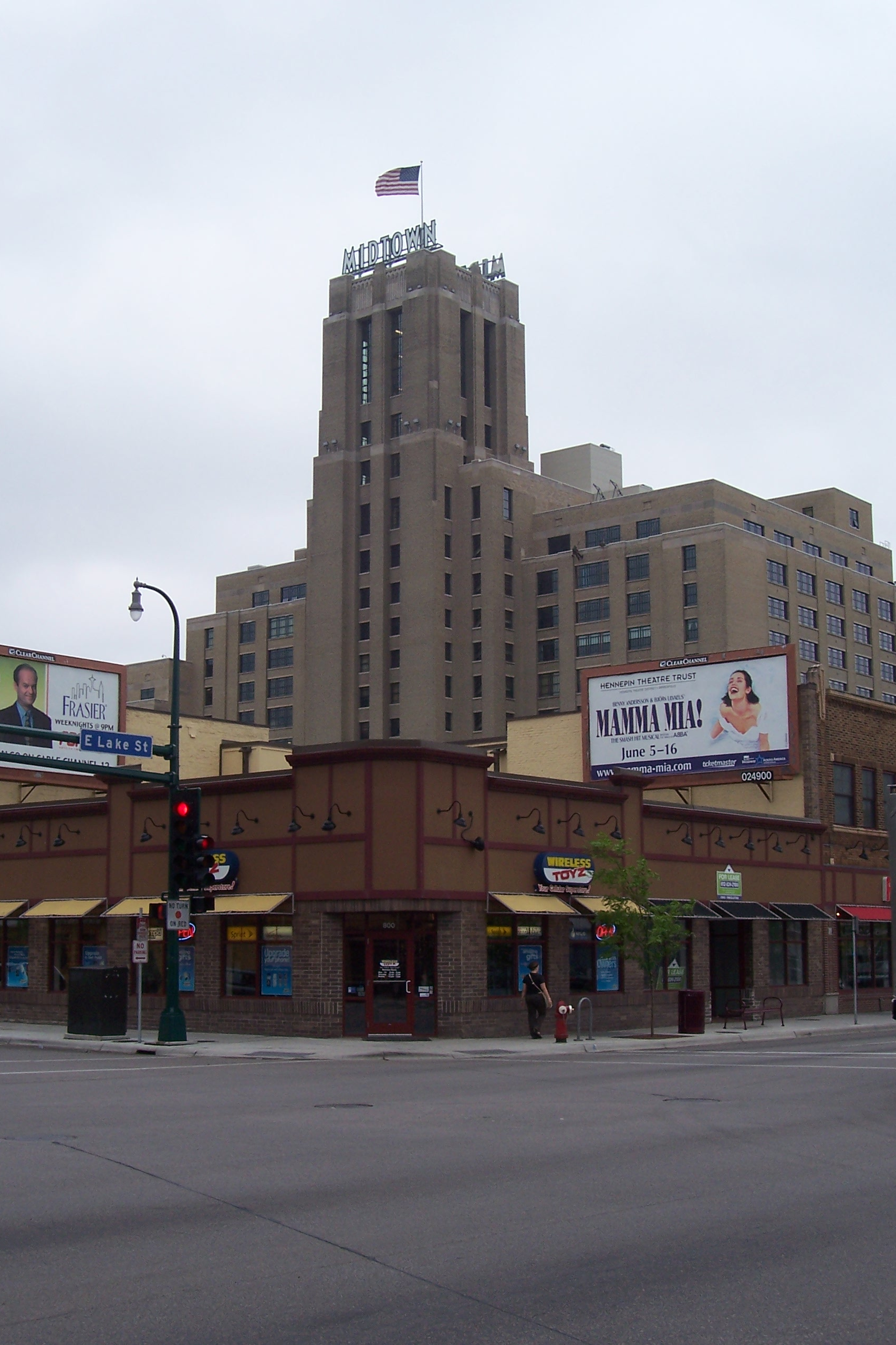
The Midtown Exchange building as seen from Lake Street in 2007

An example of renewed interest in the area is the refurbishment of the Midtown Exchange building at East Lake Street and Chicago Avenue South. Formerly one of the most notoriously crime-ridden intersections in the city, is now home to an Allina Hospitals and Clinics expansion that brought 1,500 new employees to the area; the Sheraton Minneapolis Midtown Hotel and the Midtown Global Market with a wide variety of shopping, dining, events and rental. At 15th Avenue South, In the Heart of the Beast Puppet and Mask Theatre repurposed its Historic Avalon Theatre.

East of Hiawatha Avenue, Lake Street stretches through the Longfellow and Cooper neighborhoods. This section represents the last remnants of Scandinavian investment for which Longfellow is well known. Recent investment in eastern Minneapolis includes new development at the corner of West River Parkway and East Lake Street, anchoring the Lake Street-Marshall Bridge. This area is populated with middle-class homes and businesses, with property values rising as the street approaches the Mississippi River. The north-south stretch where Lake Street meets the river is a popular recreation destination, providing residents and visitors access to multi-use trails that are part of the Grand Rounds National Scenic Byway system and the more rustic Winchell Trail for hiking. Beneath the Lake Street-Marshall Bridge is the Minneapolis Rowing Club Boathouse.

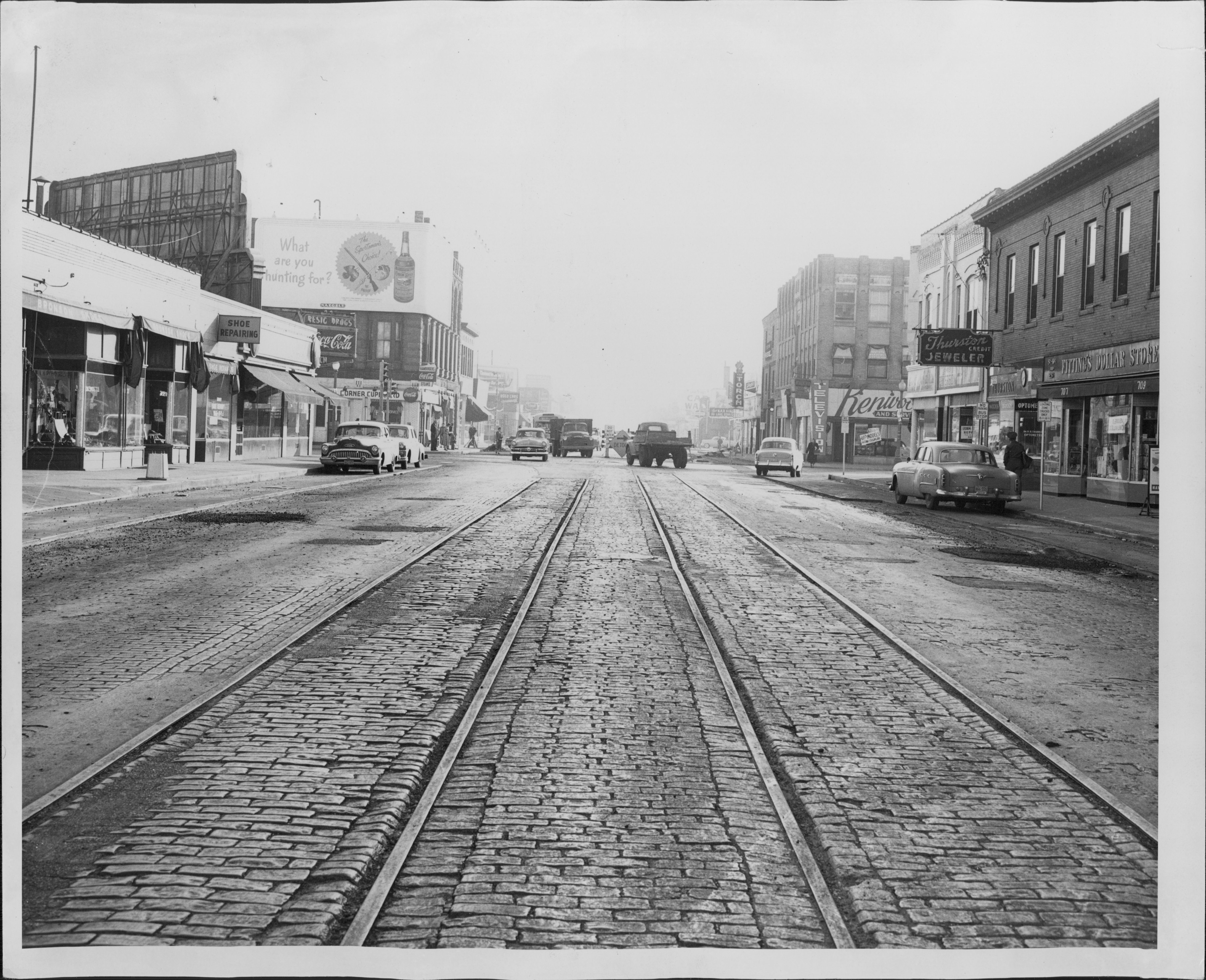
Streetcar tracks at Lake St. and Lyndale Ave. 1955

== Automobile era effects ==
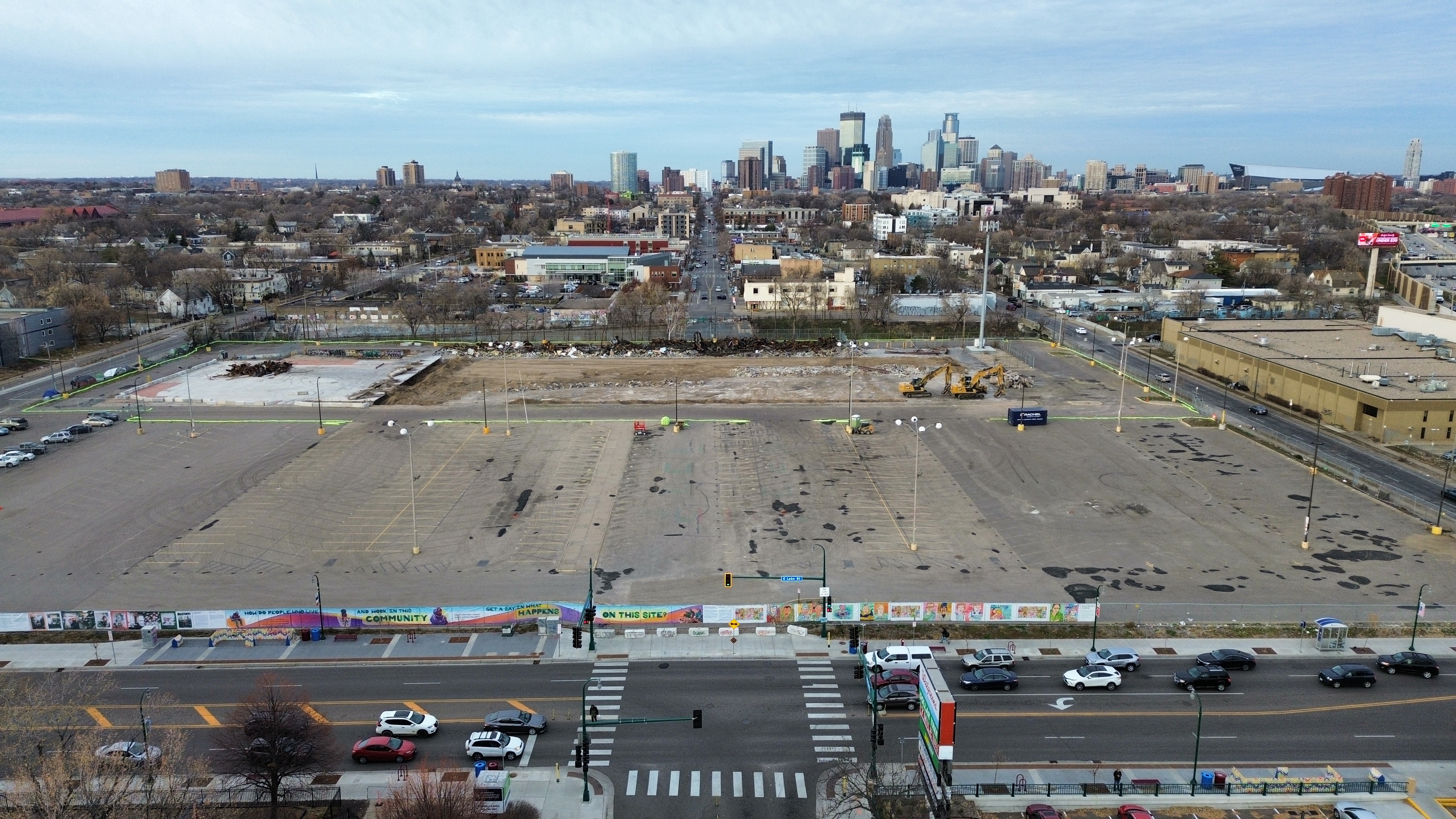
Nicollet Ave at Lake Street looking north with the former Kmart site.

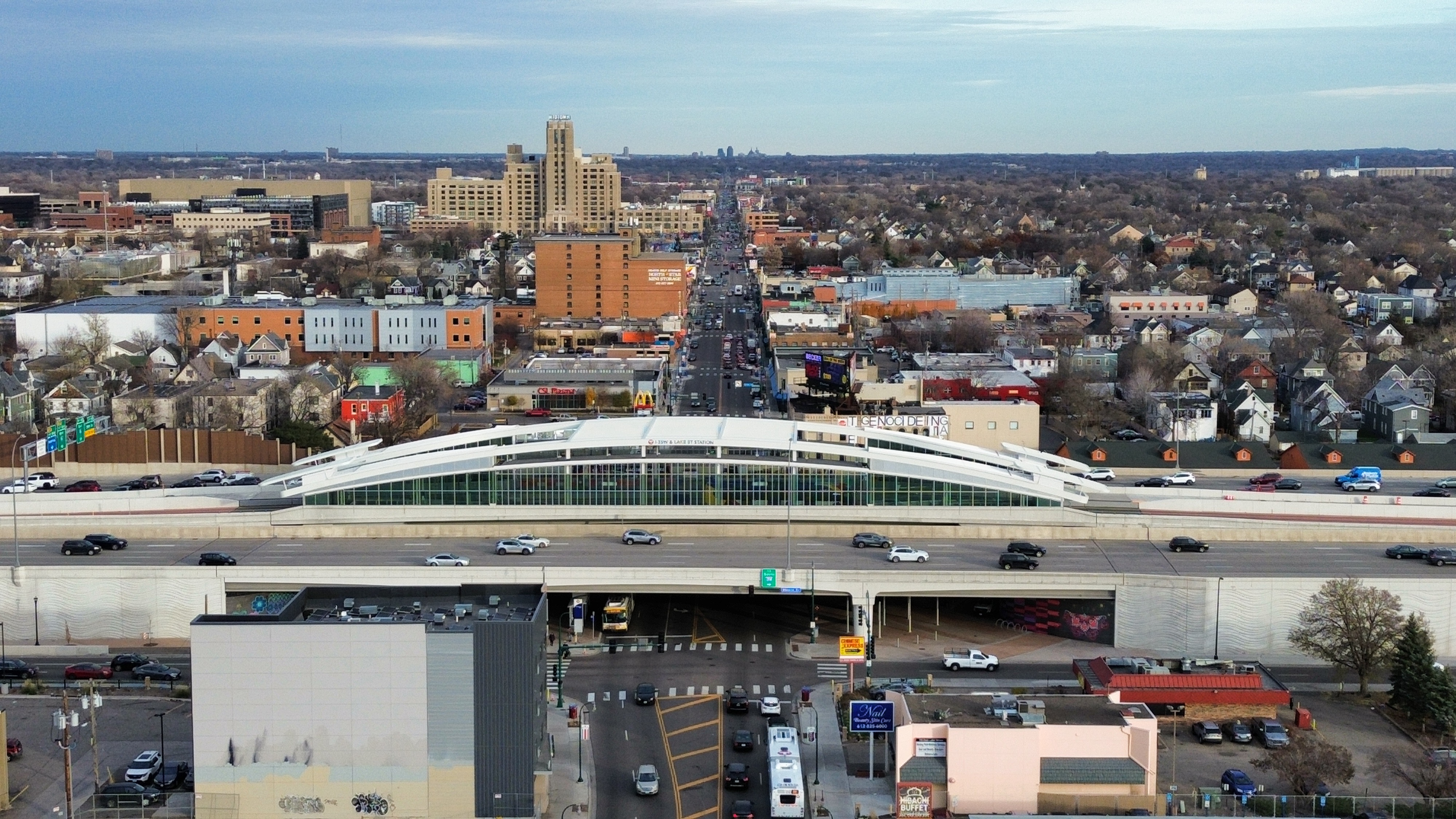
Lake Street looking east from Nicollet Ave with Interstate 35W in the foreground and the Midtown Exchange visible in the background.

While originally developed around the Selby-Lake streetcar, Lake Street became a heavily automobile oriented corridor, especially after the removal of streetcars in the 1950s. Lake Street and University Avenue were two of the most auto-oriented corridors in the Twin Cities. Poet John Berryman referred to Lake Street in a poem as, "Lake Street where the used cars live". In 1955, Lake Street had 14 new car dealerships and almost 60 used car businesses. As suburban retail grew and wealthier households in south Minneapolis moved further south of Lake Street or to the suburbs, businesses on Lake Street deteriorated. New car dealerships left the corridor and the used car businesses focused on lower-end vehicles. In 1977, the construction of a Kmart closed off Nicollet Avenue at Lake Street and combined two city blocks.

Many traditional streetcar-era buildings were razed during the auto era and much of Lake Street contains 1960s-era auto-oriented businesses with parking lots. Near the intersection of Lake Street and 27th Avenue was a large industrial complex that eventually served Minneapolis Moline. By 1972, the Minneapolis Moline factory shut down and a Target store opened in 1976. More suburban oriented developments with large parking lots and businesses set back from the street followed in the area including a Rainbow Foods in the mid-1980s.

== 21st century ==
Protests following the murder of George Floyd in 2020 caused widespread damage along Lake Street. More than 30 businesses were damaged or destroyed including the Third Precinct Police building. In the next four years $100 million, collected mostly from private donations, was spent on restoring buildings or building new buildings in the area. The arson-damaged Coliseum Building and Hall was listed on the National Register of Historic Places and underwent a $28 million renovation.

The Kmart at Nicollet Avenue was torn down in November 2023 and the city of Minneapolis is developing plans to reconnect the street grid with Lake Street. Construction is expected to start in 2025. Efforts to redevelop more multi-use and density have been successful. Public investment and private redevelopment has occurred throughout the Lake Street corridor with a new public library near Minnehaha Avenue and the new mixed-use anchor building at Chicago Avenue, the Midtown Exchange.

== Transportation ==
Streetcars began running on Lake Street in 1905. With the construction of the original Lake Street/Marshall Avenue bridge in 1906, streetcars extended from downtown Saint Paul to almost Hennepin Avenue in Minneapolis primarily along Selby Avenue and Lake Street. Streetcar service ended in 1953 when the line was replaced by buses. Lake Street developed into a busy commercial corridor because of the Selby-Lake streetcar line. At the peak, streetcars came every 3 minutes and ridership per mile along Lake Street was the highest in the Twin Cities.

The Metro Blue Line light-rail, (formerly known as the Hiawatha Light Rail line), serves Lake Street at Hiawatha Avenue with the Lake Street/Midtown station. The station itself is one of the most expensive along the line because it had to be elevated above a busy intersection. Furthermore, the Lake Street station has become one of the most crime-ridden stops along the Blue Line. Beginning in August 2012, police have increased patrols, added 24 new high definition cameras, and even added classical music in an effort to deter troublemakers.

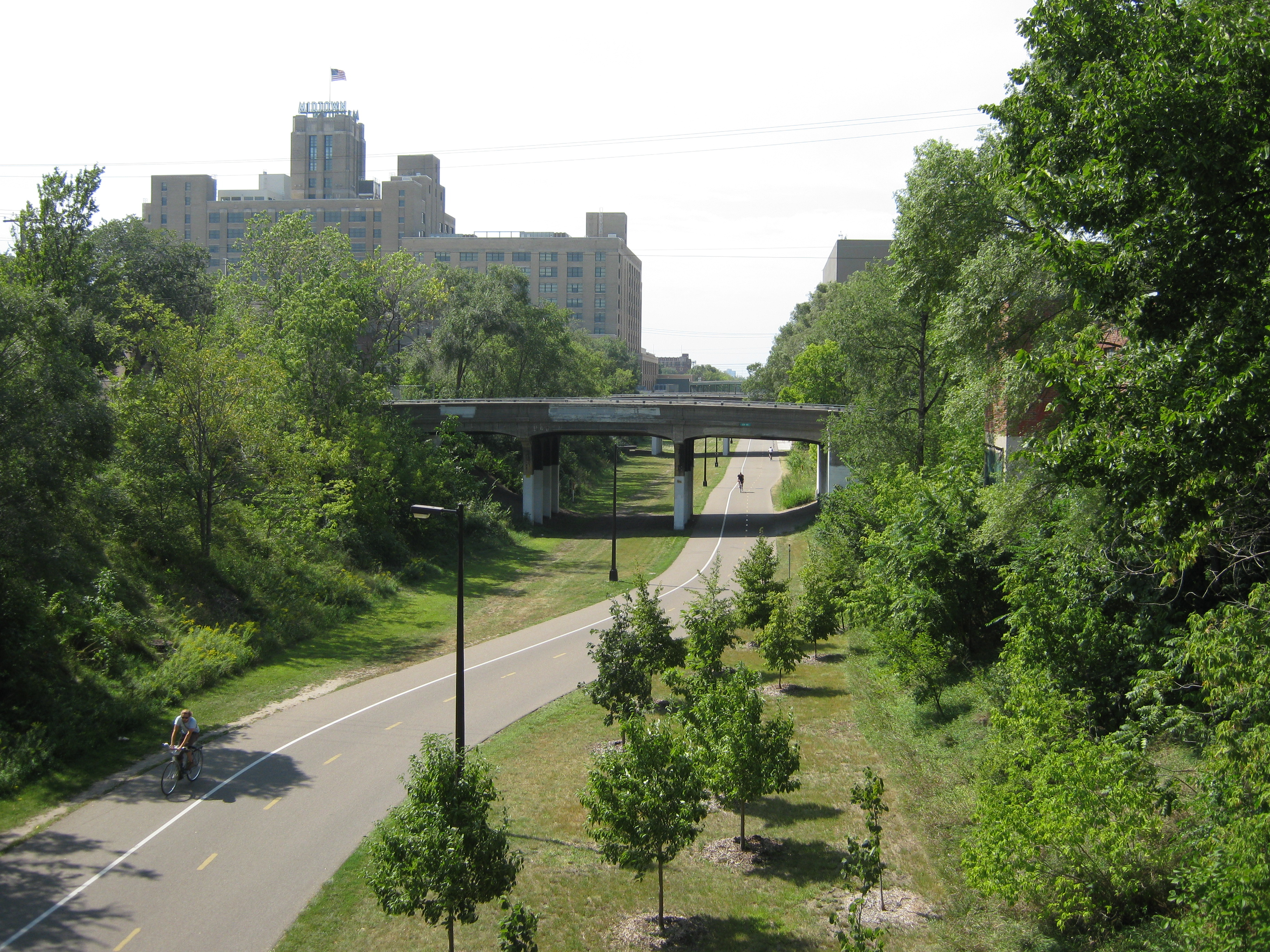
Midtown Greenway looking west with the Midtown Exchange building in the background.

Metro Transit conducted a study to determine the potential for a future transitway along Lake Street and the Midtown Greenway corridor. The Midtown Greenway is about a block to the north of Lake Street and is a former freight rail bed that has been converted into a pedestrian and bicycle path.Alternatives looked at enhanced bus service on Lake Street, a rail transitway within the Midtown Greenway, and a dual alternative that features both enhanced bus service and a rail alternative. The dual option of both improved bus service and a rail alternative was selected in 2014.

The $20 million I-35W & Lake Street station was constructed on Lake Street at Interstate 35W to serve the Metro Orange Line, a bus rapid transit line that connects downtown Minneapolis south along I-35W to Burnsville. In the future, the Metro B Line will travel on Lake Street between West Lake Station connecting with the Metro Green Line Extension to downtown Saint Paul at Saint Paul Union Depot. The B Line will largely replace Metro Transit's Route 21 which travels along Lake Street. Route 21 has the second highest ridership for bus routes in the Twin Cities.

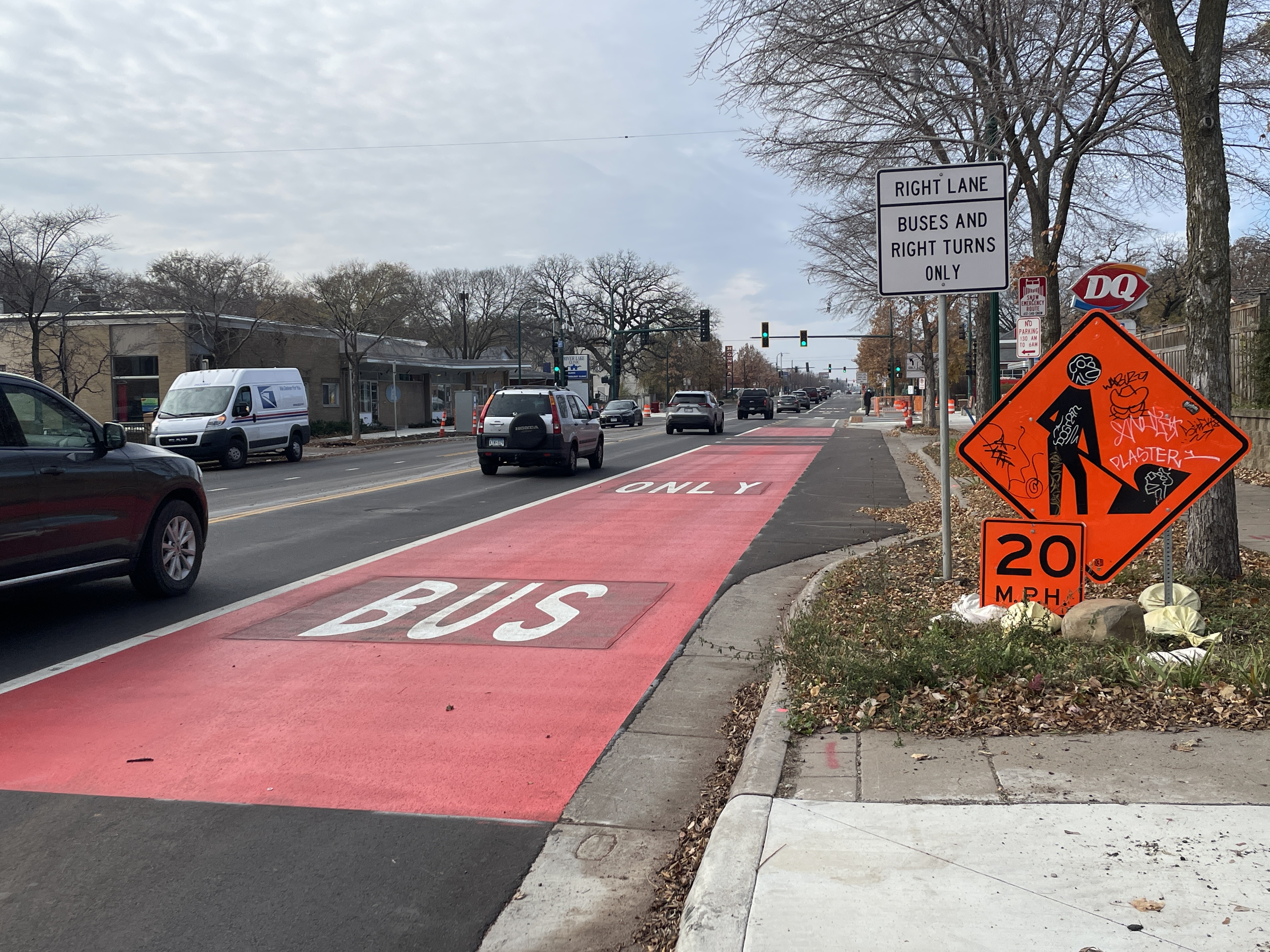
Bus only lane on westbound East Lake Street installed in 2023.

Lake Street is a Hennepin County Road. This road is currently 4 lanes wide but Hennepin County has plans to make changes to the road to improve safety of the corridor. Hennepin County received a RAISE grant to reduce the road to 3 lanes, add a bus only lane, and improve pedestrian accessibility and safety.

== Major intersections ==
County	Location	mi	km	Destinations	Notes
Hennepin	Minnetonka	0	0.0	Powderhorn Drive	Western terminus of Lake Street Extension
Hennepin	Minnetonka	0.04	0.064	CSAH 101	
Hennepin	Minnetonka	1.97	3.17	Linnell Drive	West end of gap in road; separated by I-494
Hennepin	Minnetonka	Gap in route			
Hennepin	Minnetonka	2.69	4.33	CSAH 60 (Baker Road)	East end of gap in road
Hennepin	Minnetonka	3.25	5.23	MN 7 west / Dvorak Road	West end of gap in road; separated by MN 7
Hennepin	Minnetonka	Gap in route			
Hennepin	Minnetonka	3.381	5.441	Briarwood Drive	East end of Lake Street Extension
Hennepin	Gap in route				
Hennepin	Hopkins	0	0.0	Van Buren Avenue north	West end of Lake Street
Hennepin	St. Louis Park	0.93	1.50	MN 7 / Louisiana Avenue	West end of gap in road; separated by MN 7
Hennepin	St. Louis Park	Gap in route			
Hennepin	St. Louis Park	0.95	1.53	Brownlow Avenue / Walker Street	East end of gap in road
Hennepin	St. Louis Park	1.89	3.04	CSAH 5 (Minnetonka Boulevard)	West end of gap in road; separated by Minnetonka Boulevard
Hennepin	St. Louis Park	Gap in route			
Hennepin	St. Louis Park	0.929	1.495	CSAH 5 west (Minnetonka Boulevard) / CSAH 25 west to MN 7	East end of gap in road; street assumes CSAH 25 mileage
Hennepin	Minneapolis	1.396 10.349	2.247 16.655	CSAH 25 west (Excelsior Boulevard)	Street assumes CSAH 3 mileage
Hennepin	Minneapolis	11.886	19.129	CSAH 22 (Lyndale Avenue)	
Hennepin	Minneapolis	12.385	19.932	Nicollet Avenue	
Hennepin	Minneapolis	12.509	20.131	To I-35W south / Stevens Avenue	
Hennepin	Minneapolis	13.88	22.34	CSAH 152 (Cedar Avenue)	
Hennepin	Minneapolis	14.29– 14.342	23.00– 23.081	MN 55 (Hiawatha Avenue)	
Hennepin	Minneapolis	15.937	25.648	Great River Road (National Route) / West River Parkway	
Mississippi River		16.0	25.7	Lake Street-Marshall Bridge; Hennepin–Ramsey county line Minneapolis–Saint Paul city limits	
1.000 mi = 1.609 km; 1.000 km = 0.621 mi
