= Lake Street-Marshall Bridge =

Lake Street–Marshall Avenue Bridge
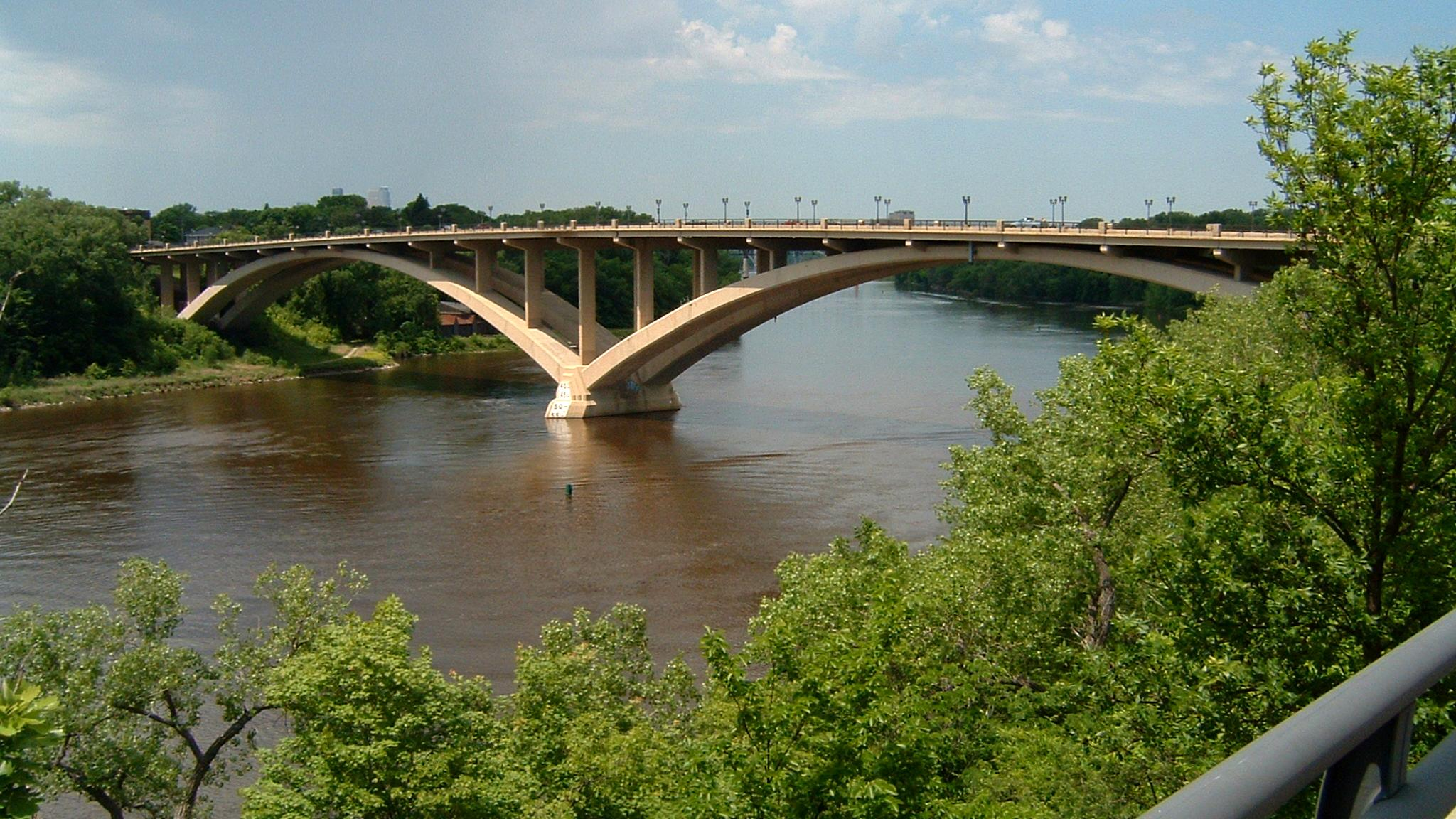
- Coordinates: 44°56′54.69″N 93°12′8.23″W
- Carries: Four lanes of vehicle traffic (Lake Street in Minneapolis to Marshall Avenue in St. Paul)
- Crosses: Mississippi River
- Locale: Minneapolis–Saint Paul, Minnesota
- Maintained by: Ramsey and Hennepin Counties
- ID number: 62082

Characteristics
- Design: Concrete arch
- Total length: 1,484 feet (452 m)
- Width: 76 feet (23 m)
- Longest span: 555.5 feet (169.3 m)
- Clearance below: 66 feet (20 m)

History
- Opened: 1992

The Lake Street–Marshall Avenue Bridge is a reinforced concrete arch bridge that spans the Mississippi River between Minneapolis, Minnesota and St. Paul, Minnesota. It is oriented east-west and connects Lake Street in Minneapolis to Marshall Avenue in St. Paul. St. Paul residents often refer to it as the Marshall Avenue Bridge. The bridge was designed by Howard, Needles, Tammen, and Bergendoff.

== History ==
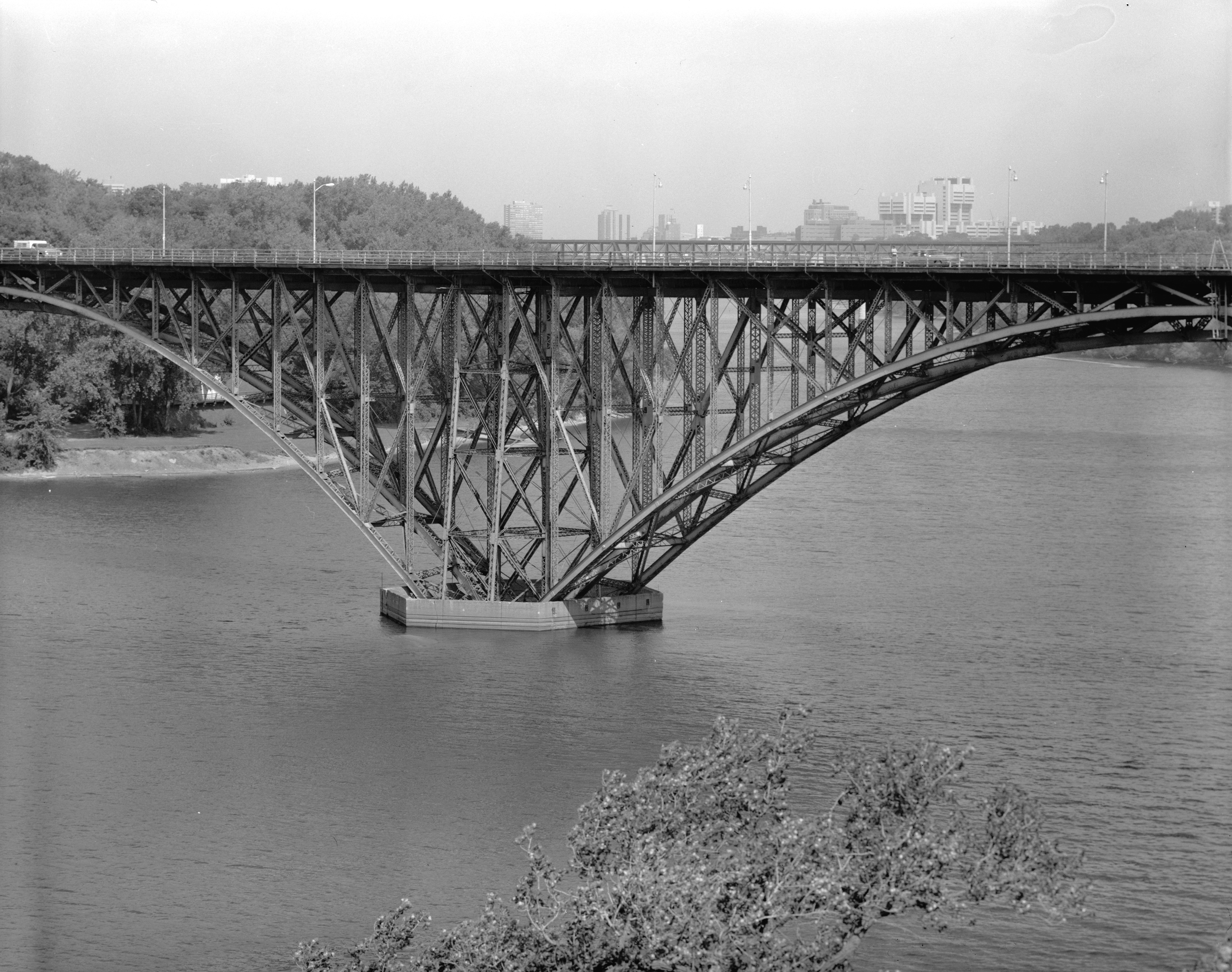
1889 bridge, photographed in 1989

The current Lake Street–Marshall Avenue Bridge replaced the previous bridge, a wrought-iron span built in 1889. The previous bridge was the second-oldest bridge in use over the Mississippi, next to the Eads Bridge in St. Louis, Missouri, built in 1874. At the time, the Minneapolis Tribune opined that the new bridge was a "foolish extravagance," since there were already seven bridges over the river. However, the Lake Street–Marshall Avenue Bridge became a major connection between Minneapolis and St. Paul. Before the construction of the freeway system, it carried U.S. Route 212 over the Mississippi River.

When construction on the new bridge started in 1989, the builders built the first half of the new bridge while keeping the old bridge in service. Unfortunately, an accident ended up delaying construction. The falsework for one of the arches collapsed on April 24, 1990, causing the arch itself to collapse, killing construction worker Robert A. Moser. Later, when it came time to demolish the old bridge, crews tried to take it down with explosives, but the first effort didn't bring the bridge down. It took another, more powerful batch of explosives to bring the old bridge down a few weeks later.

== See also ==
- List of bridges documented by the Historic American Engineering Record in Minnesota
- List of crossings of the Upper Mississippi River
