= Lake Street/Midtown station =

Light rail station in Minneapolis, Minnesota

Lake Street/Midtown
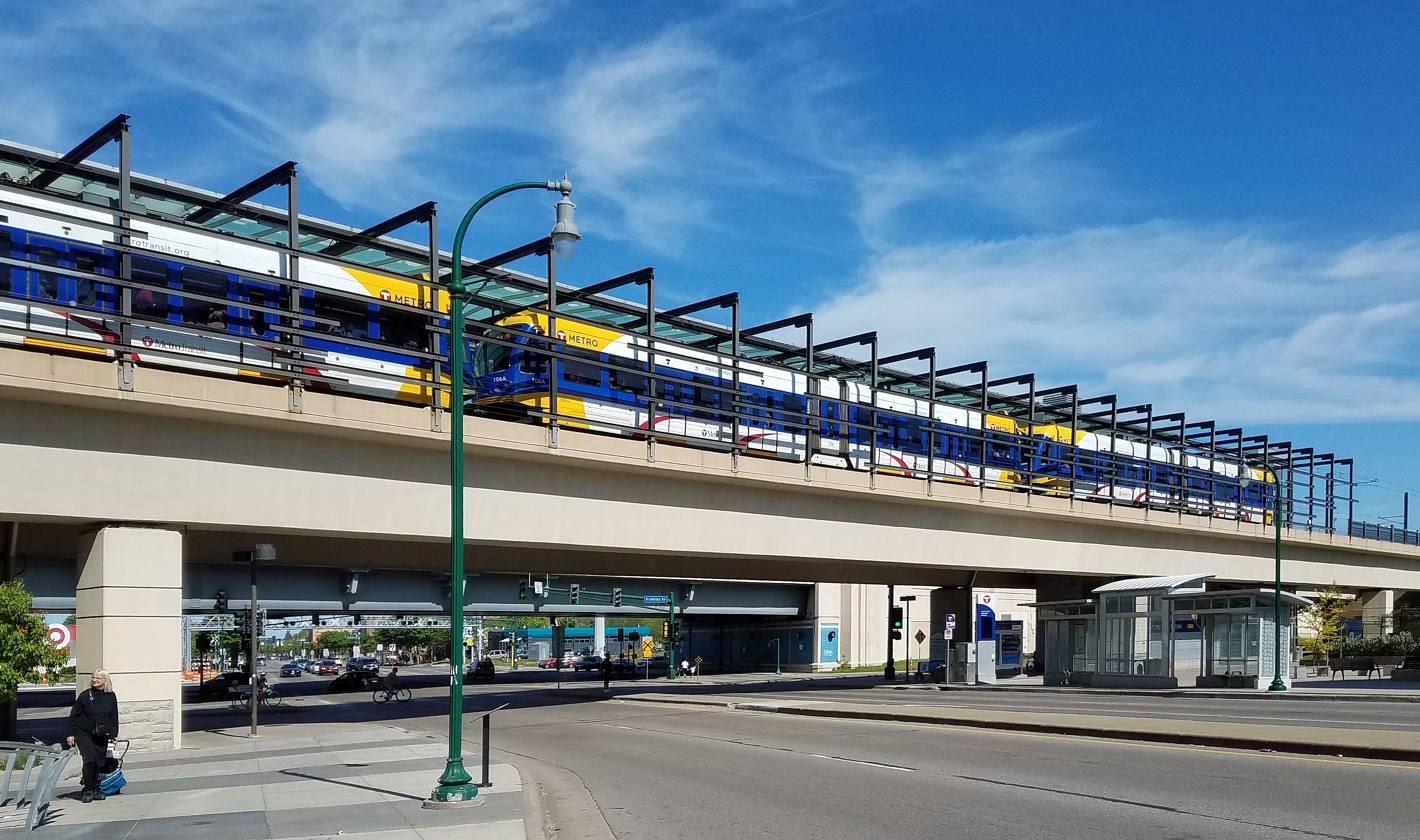
- Lake Street/Midtown station platform

General information
- Location: 2310 Lake Street East; Minneapolis, Minnesota
- Coordinates: 44°56′54″N 93°14′20″W
- Owner: Metro Transit
- Platforms: 1 island platform
- Tracks: 2

Construction
- Structure type: Elevated
- Accessible: Yes

History
- Opened: June 26, 2004

Passengers
- 2025: 1,347 daily ▼2.9% (LRT)
- Rank: 10 out of 37
- 2025: 1,021 daily (BRT)
- Rank: 7 out of 129

Services
Preceding station	Metro	Following station
Franklin Avenue toward Target Field	Blue Line	38th Street toward Mall of America
Lake & Cedar toward Lake & France	B Line	Lake & Minnehaha toward Saint Paul Union Depot
Location

Lake Street/Midtown station, also referred locally as either the Lake Street station or Midtown station, is a Blue Line light rail stop in Minneapolis, Minnesota, United States. The station is located on a bridge over East Lake Street adjacent to Highway 55.

The station offers connections to buses on Lake Street which include the Metro B Line, which has stations below the Blue Line station on Lake Street. An eastbound BRT station was built in 2015, while the west station was built in 2024 ahead of the opening of the B Line in June 2025.

== Description ==
This elevated station spans over East Lake Street along the west side of Minnesota State Highway 55, which is known as Hiawatha Avenue along this stretch of road. This is a center-platform station. Along with the Franklin Avenue station, the Lake Street/Midtown station is one of the two above-grade stations on the Blue Line. Service began at this station when the Blue Line opened on June 26, 2004.

The Midtown Station is one of four stations immediately adjacent to Hiawatha Avenue. Others include 38th Street Station, 46th Street Station, and 50th Street Station. The Hiawatha Corridor features a wide variety of architecture including grain elevators, subsidized housing, and well-established neighborhoods, such as Longfellow and Corcoran.

Just north of the station, the Blue Line crosses over Hiawatha Avenue on a concrete box girder flyover before returning to grade level.

The seasonal Midtown Farmers' Market operates weekly on a space immediately adjacent to the station. The market features produce, meat, cheese, bread, eggs, flowers, crafts, hot food, music and family-oriented entertainment.

In July 2008, local residents teamed up with Metro Transit and Xcel Energy to decorate several electric boxes situated between the station and the park and ride lot. The murals painted on the structures depict grain stalks on a blue sky, and are intended to represent the Midtown Farmers' Market held adjacent to the station. Local residents also encouraged Metro Transit to install sidewalks and stairs along lines of bare dirt where riders frequently cut through a sloping grassy area. This improved station access and reduced erosion problems.

This station was planned to serve as the terminus of the Minneapolis Streetcar System's Midtown Greenway Line.

== Park and Ride lot ==
Upon opening, the station hosted a 170-space park and ride lot immediately southwest of the station, leased from Anishinabe Academy elementary school. The lot was only planned to exist temporarily and close when park and ride lots outside Minneapolis opened.

It was regularly filled beyond capacity, with parking overflowing into aisles and onto nearby streets. Residents have complained about the lack of parking (and specifically the overflow onto streets) at neighborhood meetings. Crime has also been an intermittent problem in the parking lot, with victims attributing the lot's poor overhead lighting as a major contributing factor. Local residents and the neighborhood organization called upon Metro Transit to improve the lighting situation, but the process has been complicated by the fact that Metro Transit did not own the lot, but merely leased it from the public school district.

This lot was the only park and ride lot on the Blue Line within the city of Minneapolis. The lot closed March 7, 2015 for redevelopment. There are over 2,500 park and ride spaces at Fort Snelling station and 28th Avenue station at the southern end of the Blue Line.

== Bus connections and future bus rapid transit ==
From the station, passengers go down one level to make direct connections to bus routes 21.

The station is a stop on the Metro B Line, a bus rapid transit line that replaced Route 21 along Lake Street and Selby Avenue. Before the opening of the B Line, Route 21 was carrying 10,000 passengers every weekday, while only making up 2% of traffic on Lake Street. Improvements include specialized stations and buses and frequent all-day service. To speed up travel times, which usually slows to 8 mph (13 km/h) during rush hours, off-board fare collection, near-level boarding, and transit signal priority have been implemented.

The B Line currently provides a crosstown connection to the Orange Line, D Line, and A Line with the final terminus at Union Depot in downtown Saint Paul, Minnesota, and will later continue the connection to the Green Line Extension and the E Line when they begin operations. The eastbound BRT station was constructed in 2015 and includes a distinct shelter and station marker, near-level boarding, heating and lighting, and infrastructure for off-board fare collection. The B Line went through engineering in 2020, with construction starting in 2023, and passenger operations beginning in 2025.

== Future ==
Since opening 20 years ago, the condition of the station has declined with frequent vandalism, shattered glass, broken elevators and escalators, and higher levels of crime. Since 2023 there have been security guards positioned at the station which transit officials say have been effective at reducing crime. There have been several high profile shootings and assaults at the station.

In 2024, the Metropolitan Council awarded a contract to redesign the station with construction potentially beginning in 2025. The light rail system in Minnesota is based on proof-of-payment but the Metropolitan Council is considering enclosing the station with faregates.

== Notable places nearby ==
- Longfellow neighborhood
- Corcoran neighborhood
- Hiawatha LRT Trail
- Little Earth Trail
- Minnehaha Mall & Hi-Lake Shopping Center
- Midtown YWCA
- Midtown Farmers' Market
- Minneapolis South High School
- Green Institute
