= Corcoran, Minneapolis =

Neighborhood of Powderhorn, Minneapolis

Coordinates: 44.9425°N 93.2407°W

Corcoran
- Neighborhood
- Corcoran Park

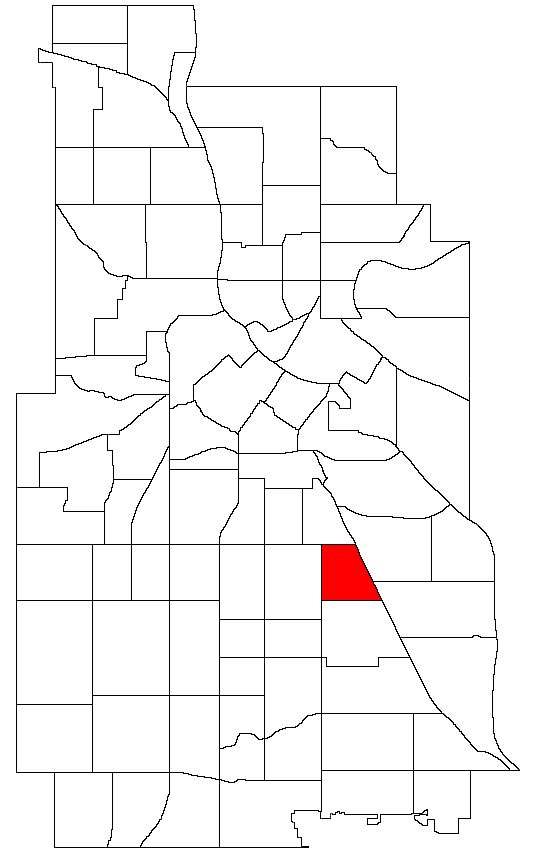
- Location of Corcoran within the U.S. city of Minneapolis
- Interactive map of Corcoran
- Country: United States
- State: Minnesota
- County: Hennepin
- City: Minneapolis
- Community: Powderhorn
- Founded: 1849
- City Council Ward: 9

Government
  - Council Member: Jason Chavez

Area
  - Total: 0.457 sq mi (1.18 km^{2})

Population (2020)
  - Total: 4,708
  - Density: 10,300/sq mi (3,980/km^{2})
- Time zone: UTC-6 (CST)
  - Summer (DST): UTC-5 (CDT)
- ZIP code: 55406, 55407
- Area code: 612

Historical population
Census	Pop.	Note	%±
1980	3,760		—
1990	3,635		−3.3%
2000	4,228		16.3%
2010	3,942		−6.8%
2020	4,708		19.4%

Corcoran is a neighborhood in Minneapolis, Minnesota, United States. The neighborhood is bordered by Longfellow and Howe neighborhoods to the east, Phillips to the north, Powderhorn Park to the west and Standish to the south. Its official boundaries are East Lake Street to the north, Hiawatha Avenue to the east, East 36th Street to the south, and Cedar Avenue to the west. It is entirely located within Minneapolis City Council Ward 9 and legislative district 63A.

Corcoran is home to Minneapolis South High School. The seasonal Midtown Farmers' Market, a project of the Corcoran Neighborhood Organization, operates weekly on a site in the neighborhood.

The Corcoran neighborhood is known for its public art and strong sense of community among neighbors.

== Demographics ==
Race/ethnicity
Race/ethnicity	2000		2010		2020	
Race/ethnicity	Number	%	Number	%	Number	%
White alone	2,004	47.40	1,886	47.84	2,017	44.70
Black alone	656	15.52	505	12.81	883	19.57
Hispanic or Latino (any race)	897	21.22	1,109	28.13	1,130	25.04
Native American alone	178	4.21	162	4.11	104	2.30
Asian alone	190	4.49	107	2.71	107	2.37
Other race alone	47	1.11	24	0.61	32	0.71
Pacific Islander alone	1	0.02	2	0.05	0	0.00
Two or more races	255	6.03	147	3.73	239	5.30
Total	4,228	100.0	3,942	100.0	4,512	100.0
