= Alano Society of Minneapolis Clubhouse =

Historic house in Minneapolis, MN

- U.S. National Register of Historic Places
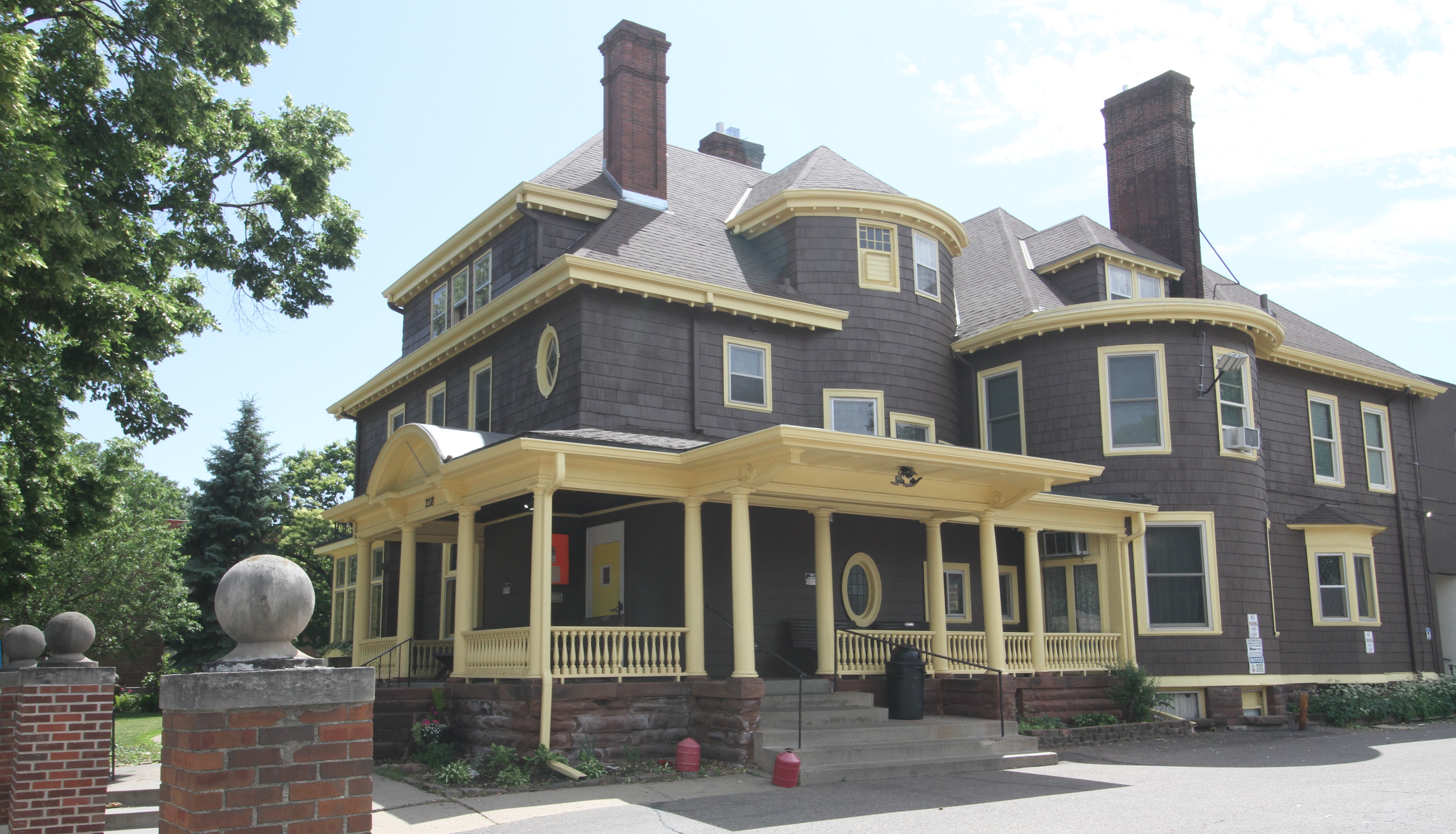
- Alano Society of Minneapolis Clubhouse in 2022
- Location: 2218 1st Ave. S., Minneapolis, Minnesota
- Coordinates: 44°57′36″N 93°16′37″W
- Built by: Pike & Cook; E.M. Ganley Co.
- Architect: William Channing Whitney
- Architectural style: Late Victorian/Shingle Style
- NRHP reference No.: 100007071

The Alano Society of Minneapolis Clubhouse is a historic clubhouse located in the Whittier neighborhood of Minneapolis, Minnesota. It is located within the Washburn-Fair Oaks Mansion District. The house was originally built in 1887 for John Washburn, the nephew of Cadwallader C. Washburn, who founded Washburn, Crosby & Co., which later became General Mills. The house came up for sale in March 1942, and the Alano Society of Minneapolis purchased it for $19,000. Other groups were offering up to $30,000 for the house, so it is possible that the owner, Sydney Young (daughter of John Washburn and his wife Elizabeth) was supportive of the goals of Alcoholics Anonymous and the Alano Society of Minneapolis. The deed to the property directed that some or all of the house would be kept in its original form.

Alcoholics Anonymous itself was formed in the spring of 1935, when its founders Bill W. and Bob S. met. Bill W. had recently found sobriety through the Oxford Group, while Bob S. was a struggling alcoholic. Bill lived with Bob and his wife Anne for several weeks and convinced Bob to give up alcohol. In the process, Bill W. and Bob S. were convinced they could help other men give up alcohol, so they brought others to Oxford Group meetings, as well as meetings in Bill W.'s own house. In 1938, Bill W. had formulated the Twelve Steps. The next year, Bill published the book Alcoholics Anonymous: The Story of How One Hundred Men Have Recovered from Alcoholism. A group in Cleveland, Ohio was founded in May 1939 under the name Alcoholics Anonymous, and by October 1939 both the original group in Bill W.'s home in Brooklyn and the Cleveland group had separated from the Oxford Group. During 1941, AA members traveling on business brought the movement to new cities such as Milwaukee, St. Louis, Boston, Miami, and Minneapolis. An article in the Saturday Evening Post in February 1941 brought national recognition to the group.

In Minneapolis, Bernard Patrick John Thomas Cronin was struggling with alcoholism. He found a review of the book Alcoholics Anonymous in the early summer of 1940, and then later found the book in the public library. Cronin wrote to the Alcoholic Foundation in New York hoping to find AA members in Minneapolis. The New York office forwarded his contact information to two AA members in Chicago, who visited Cronin in November 1940. Chandler Forman and Bill Long stayed with Cronin for four days, over the span of the 1940 Armistice Day Blizzard, and Cronin found sobriety. He wanted to spread the message to other alcoholics, although success was limited until the Saturday Evening Post article in February 1941. Cronin worked with Minneapolis Star columnist Cedric Adams to get the word out about Alcoholics Anonymous. By April 1941, six AA members were meeting in rented quarters on Franklin Avenue. By July, the group had almost 80 members. In October of that year, with about 100 members, the chapter was moved to rented club rooms at 19th Street and Park Avenue. The group often divided into smaller "squads" that met in members' houses, club rooms, and the Citizen's Aid Building in downtown Minneapolis. Growing membership required more space, so Pat Cronin, Barry Collins, and Mary Barnd organized the Alano Society of Minneapolis in order to purchase property. Alcoholics Anonymous chapters traditionally did not own property, so Alano clubs were organized across the country to serve as landlords. They bought the 2218 1st. Avenue South property in May of 1942.

The club continued to expand with its new headquarters. In November 1943, the group had 200 members, including 12 women. Three years later, there were 600 members, and AA had its own telephone number in the city directory. Chapters were also formed in St. Paul, Duluth, Hibbing and many other communities in Minnesota. Other groups were formed in Wisconsin, North Dakota, and South Dakota. By 1950, Minnesota had 44 AA chapters. The club at 2218 1st Ave. S. served as an incubator for several of these chapters, such as Rochester and Mankato in 1946 and Robbinsdale in 1952. Minneapolis 2218, as the club was known, continued as the leading chapter in Minneapolis and the Upper Midwest. The clubhouse was becoming too small to accommodate all of its members, so a 53 feet (16 m) by 33.5 feet (10.2 m) two-story reinforced concrete block addition was built in 1950. The clubhouse acted as the central clearinghouse for information about AA activities in the greater Minneapolis area. Groups were spreading outside Hennepin County to Anoka, Dakota, and Scott counties, so by 1968, an AA Minneapolis Intergroup office was established. This was two years after the St. Paul Intergroup office was established.

The clubhouse was listed on the National Register of Historic Places in October 2021 for its role in social history. It is the oldest Alano Club in the world to operate continuously at a single location.
