= Franklin Muzzy =

American politician and businessman

33rd President of the Maine Senate
- In office 1855–1855
- Preceded by: Luther Moore
- Succeeded by: Lot M. Morrill

Member of the Maine Senate
- In office 1853–1855

Member of the Maine House of Representatives
- In office 1841–1842

Personal details
- Born: December 6, 1806 Spencer, Massachusetts, United States
- Died: October 28, 1873 (aged 66) Bangor, Maine, United States
- Party: Whig
- Spouse: Caroline North Macomber
- Children: 4
- Relatives: John Crosby (son-in-law); Sumner McKnight Crosby (great-grandson)
- Education: Gardiner Lyceum
- Occupation: Politician

Franklin Muzzy (December 6, 1806 – October 28, 1873) was an American politician and businessman from Maine.

== Career ==
Born in Spencer, Massachusetts, Muzzy moved to Gardiner, Maine, in 1823. Sometime before 1832, he enrolled at the Gardiner Lyceum to study drafting. Muzzy began working as a machinist and iron founder there, and later founded his own business, the Muzzy and Wing Iron Foundry, in Bangor, which by 1860, had more than thirty-five employees.

Muzzy also pursued a career in politics as a member of the Whig Party, a forerunner to the Maine Republican Party. He served in the Maine House of Representatives from 1841 to 1842, and then the Maine Senate from 1853 to 1855. In the final term, Muzzy was elected President of the Maine Senate, preceded by Luther Moore and succeeded by Lot M. Morrill. During the 1850s, Muzzy was also one of the first trustees of the Bangor Savings Bank.

== Legacy ==
Muzzy died in 1873. After his death, his daughter, Olive, married the famed businessman John Crosby in 1886. Their grandson was the noted art historian Sumner McKnight Crosby.

A carte de visite of Muzzy from circa 1855 is currently held in the Maine State Archives.

In 1990, an article on the life of Muzzy was published in the journal Maine History by Carol Toner.

== See also ==
- List of presidents of the Maine Senate
