= Bangor Savings Bank =

Bank based in Maine, U.S.

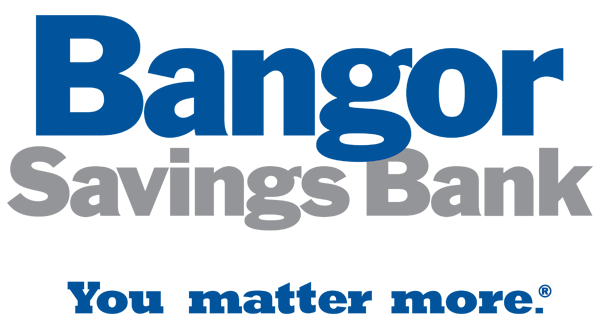
- Type: Bank
- Industry: Financial services
- Founded: 1852
- Headquarters: Bangor, Maine, U.S.
- Products: Savings; checking; consumer loans; commercial loans; mortgages; credit cards
- Total assets: US$7.26 billion
- Number of employees: 1000+
- Website: www.bangor.com

Bangor Savings Bank is a state-chartered bank in Maine and New Hampshire, United States. The company, which is headquartered in downtown Bangor, was founded in 1852 and has 69 branches across the two states. As of December 2023, the bank was the largest Maine-based bank, with roughly $7.3 billion in assets.

== History ==
On May 5, 1852, Bangor Savings Bank opened its first location in Bangor, Maine. The first deposit was for $440. During that decade, Franklin Muzzy was one of the first trustees of the bank.

By 1889, Bangor Savings Bank had relocated to a larger space at 3 State Street and had over $4.5 million in deposits. The facility was rebuilt in 1913 following the Bangor Great Fire and renovated in 1951.

In 1997, the Bangor Savings Bank Foundation was created. In FY20, the bank and its foundation invested over $3.4 million into the community.

In Fall 2015, the bank announced four branches would close in early 2016. Staff were reassigned to nearby branches within 12 miles of the closed branch. In January 2016, Bangor Savings Bank announced that it was raising the company-wide minimum wage to $13 per hour. In doing so, it raised the base wage for 240 of the company's 740 employees. As of August 2022, the company's minimum wage has increased to $18 per hour.

In October 2017, Bangor Savings Bank acquired Granite Bank of New Hampshire. The acquisition was unanimously approved by boards of directors of both banks. This will bring the total assets of BSB to $4 billion and 59 branches in NH and Maine when the transaction is complete in 2018.

In May 2019, Bangor Savings Bank opened its new operations center adjacent to its headquarters.

In December 2020, Bangor Savings Bank completed its acquisition of Damariscotta Bank and Trust.

In April 2021, Bangor Savings Bank was rated #1 bank in New England by JD Power Retail Banking Satisfaction Survey, And was listed in Forbes’ World Best Banks for 2021.
