= Sumner McKnight Crosby =

American art historian

- Born: Sumner McKnight Crosby, Sr. July 29, 1909; Minneapolis, Minnesota, United States
- Died: November 16, 1982 (aged 73); Woodbridge, Connecticut, United States
- Occupations: Art historian; Archaeologist; Educator
- Spouse: Sarah Rathbone Townsend (m. 1935)
- Children: 4
- Relatives: John Crosby (grandfather); Franklin Muzzy (great-grandfather)
- Awards: Guggenheim Fellowship (1947)

Academic background
- Education: Yale University
- Thesis: The Abbey of St.-Denis, 475-1122 (1937)

Academic work
- Discipline: Art history
- Sub-discipline: Medieval architecture
- Institutions: Yale University
- Notable students: Robert Branner
- Notable works: The Royal Abbey of Saint-Denis (1987)

Sumner McKnight Crosby, Sr. (July 29, 1909 – November 16, 1982) was an American art historian, archaeologist, and educator. A scholar of medieval architecture, specially the Basilica of Saint-Denis, Crosby was Professor of Art History at Yale University.

== Career ==
A native of Minneapolis, Crosby was born to Franklin Muzzy Crosby and Harriett Eugenie McKnight. His paternal grandfather was John Crosby, one of the founders of General Mills, and one of his great-grandfathers was Franklin Muzzy, a noted politician from Maine. Crosby attended The Blake School for middle school and then from Philips Academy for high school in 1928. He then graduated from Yale University, where he studied Art History and earned both a Bachelor of Arts in 1932 and Doctor of Philosophy in 1937. In that year, Crosby wrote a doctoral dissertation on the Basilica of Saint-Denis.

In 1936, Crosby was hired as Assistant Professor of Art History at Yale. His professorship was interrupted by World War II as he began serving as a Special Advisor for the Roberts Commissions from 1943 to 1945, as part of the Monuments, Fine Arts, and Archives program to help recover Nazi plunder. Simultaneously, Crosby also served as Executive Secretary for the American Council of Learned Societies.

Crosby was awarded a Guggenheim Fellowship in 1947, and three years later, was made a Chevalier of the Legion of Honour by the Government of France. He then rose to the rank of full Professor in 1952. Between 1947 and 1952, as well as 1962 to 1965, Crosby was also chair of the art history department.

In 1976, the journal Gesta published a series of essays in honor of Crosby. The following year, he was elected to the American Academy of Arts and Sciences and the American Philosophical Society.

Crosby died as a result of a stroke in Woodbrige in 1982, before the culmination of his studies on Saint-Denis were published by Yale University Press in 1987 titled The Royal Abbey of Saint-Denis. He used photogrammetry to accurately established the dimensions of the church in the book. Two years after that, the Crosby family donated the papers from his career to the archives of the Metropolitan Museum of Art.

== See also ==
- List of Guggenheim Fellowships awarded in 1947
- List of Monuments, Fine Arts, and Archives personnel
- List of people from Minneapolis
- List of Phillips Academy alumni
- List of Yale University people
- Lists of Légion d'honneur recipients
