= Washburn-Fair Oaks Mansion District =

Historic district in Minnesota, United States

- U.S. National Register of Historic Places
- U.S. Historic district
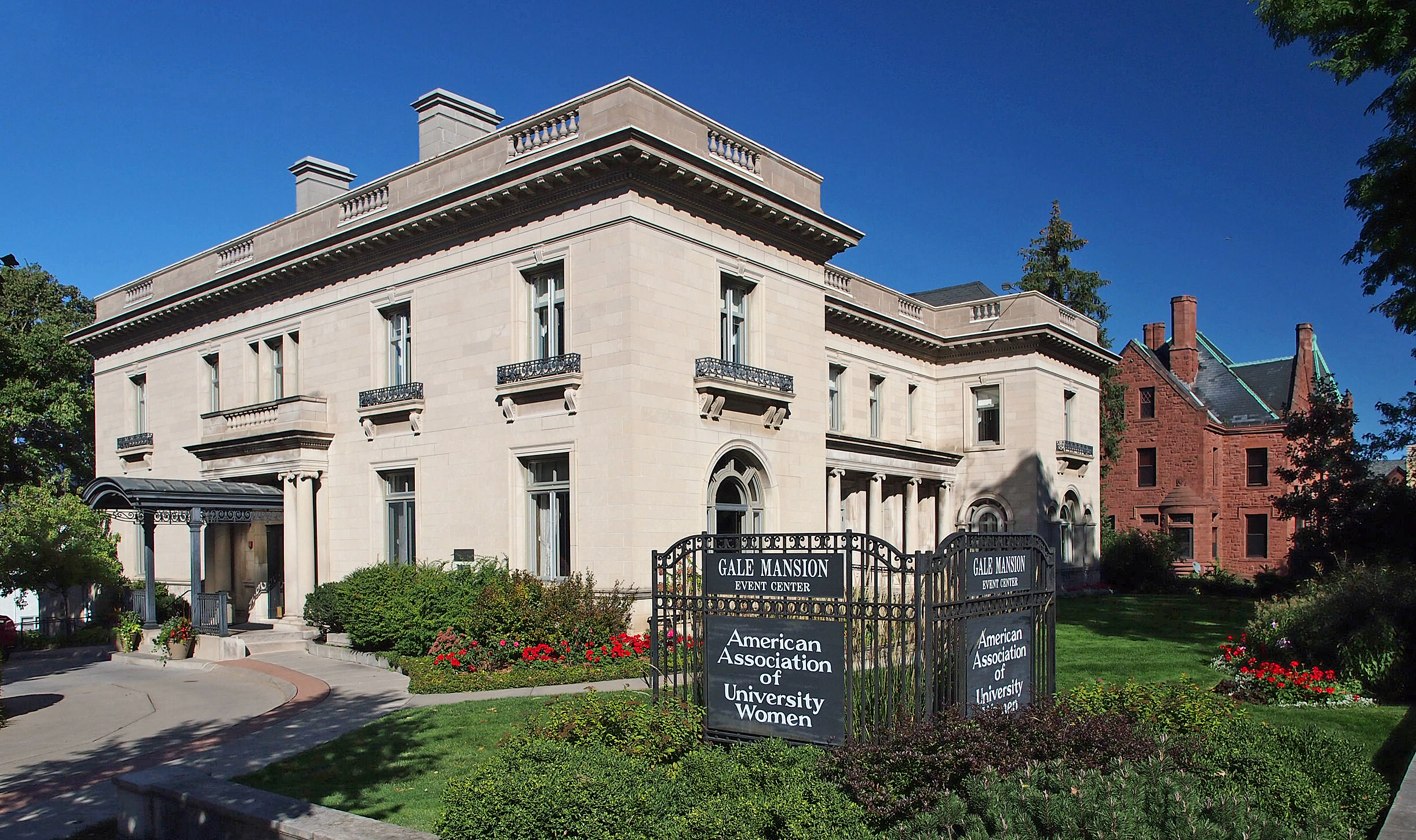
- Two mansions in the Washburn-Fair Oaks Mansion District

- Location within Minnesota Location within the United States
- Location: 1st and 2nd Avenues, 22nd Street, and Stevens Avenue, Minneapolis, Minnesota
- Coordinates: 44°57′40″N 93°16′31″W
- Area: 4 acres (1.6 ha)
- Architect: William Channing Whitney
- Architectural style: Classical Revival, Renaissance
- NRHP reference No.: 78001544
- Added to NRHP: February 17, 1978

The Washburn-Fair Oaks Mansion District is a historic district in the Whittier neighborhood of Minneapolis, Minnesota, United States, centered on Washburn-Fair Oaks Park. The city of Minneapolis designated a district bordered by Franklin Avenue, Fourth Avenue South, 26th Street East, and First Avenue South. A smaller district, listed on the National Register of Historic Places, includes seven mansions along and near 22nd Street East.

== Overview ==
The development in the area was spurred by the desire of prominent families to move away from the central business district and to build larger and more elegant homes along what was the edge of town. Development began around the early 1870s and continued through about 1930. The houses within the district represent a number of popular architectural revival styles.

The park itself is named for a now-demolished mansion known as Fairoaks. Built in 1884 by E. Townsend Mix, Fairoaks was one of the grandest Twin Cities mansions of its era. The house itself had 40 rooms and sat on a lavishly landscape lot two square blocks in size. It was built for William D. Washburn, a lawyer who moved to Minneapolis in 1857 and amassed a fortune in the family milling business. Washburn lived in the house until his death in 1912, at which point he willed the mansion to the Minneapolis Park Board. The park board ultimately found the mansion too expensive to maintain, so it was demolished in 1924.

The Minneapolis Institute of Art building is located immediately south of the park. The site was formerly occupied by the Dorilus Morrison house, built in 1858 by a lumberman who moved from Maine and became a businessman in Minneapolis, as well as the city's first mayor. Clinton Morrison agreed to donate the old family estate to the Minneapolis Society of Fine Arts. The house was demolished in 1911, and the Minneapolis Institute of Art, designed by the New York firm of McKim, Mead, and White was completed in 1915.

The neighborhood surrounding the mansion district is now home to many young professionals and artists.

== Mansions in the district ==
=== Eugene Merrill House ===
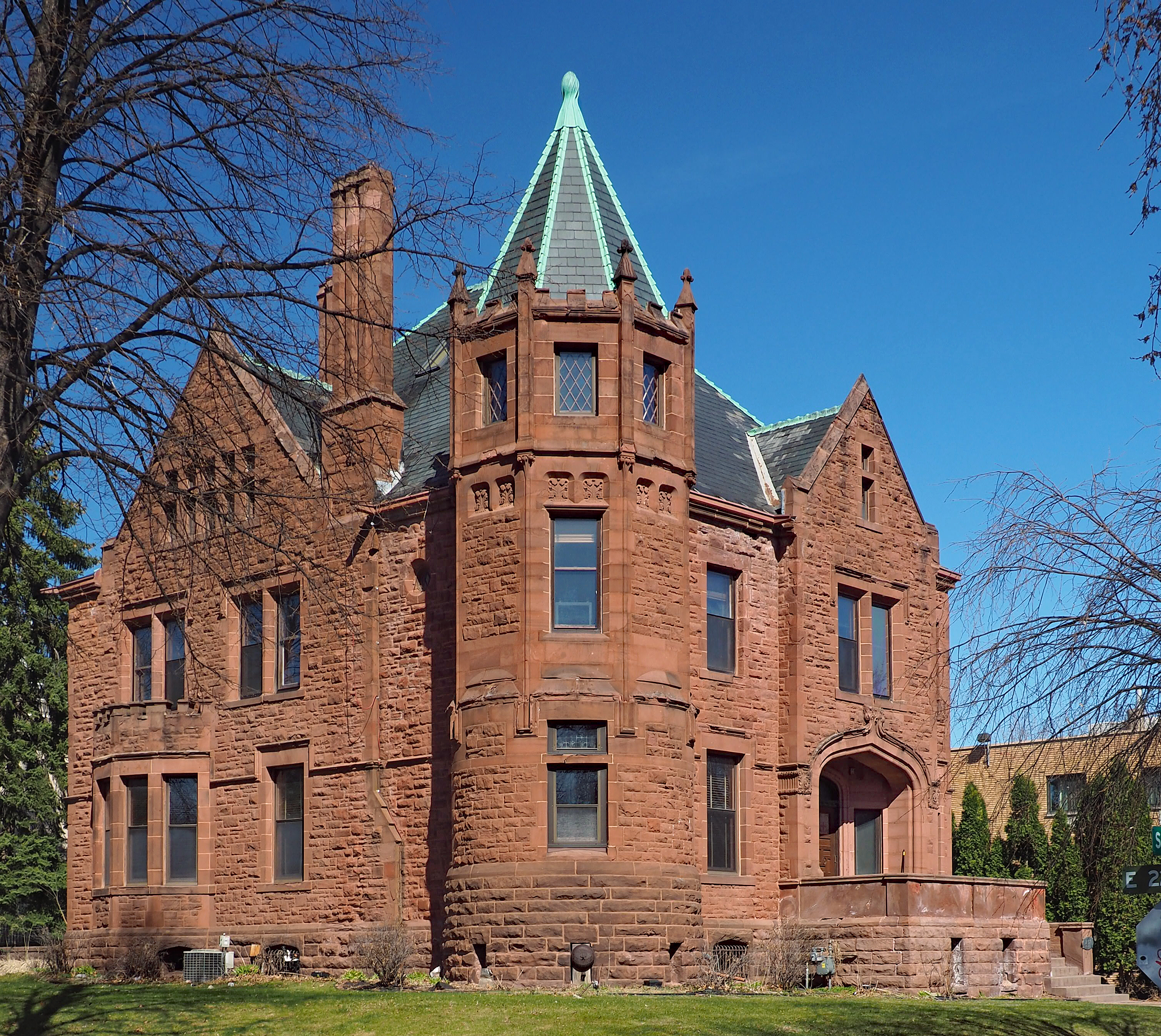
The Eugene Merrill House from the southeast

The Eugene Merrill House, at 2116 Second Avenue South, was built in 1884 by banker and lawyer Eugene Merrill, to designs by William Channing Whitney (1851–1945). The Merrill House is the oldest mansion in the district. Its rusticated red sandstone, bold massing, polygonal tower and characteristic clustered fenestration are marks of the Richardsonian Romanesque architectural style. It is now owned by Rhett A McSweeney and is the offices of McSweeney/Langevin.

=== Gale Mansion ===
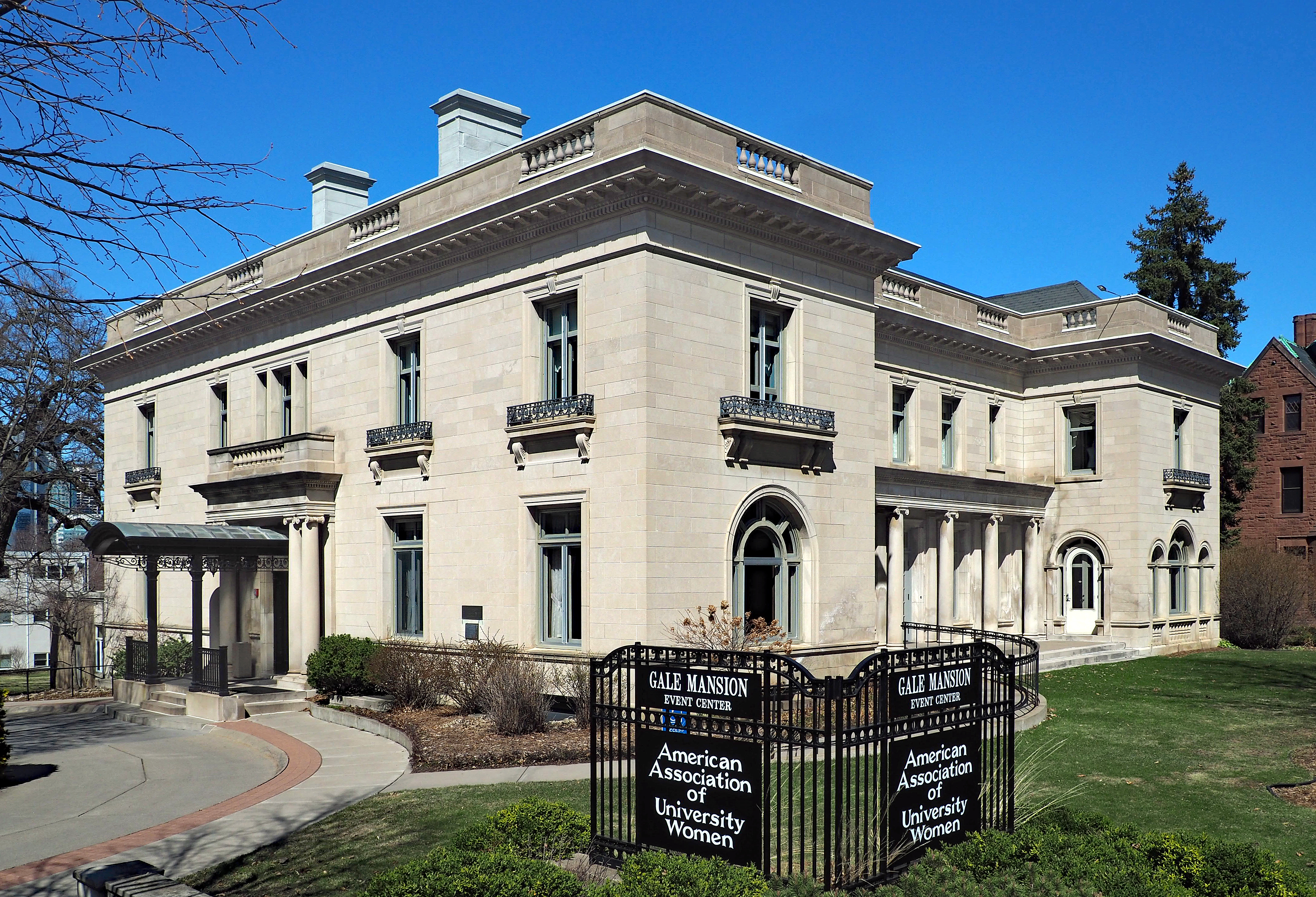
The Gale Mansion from the southwest

The Gale Mansion, at 2115 Stevens Avenue South, was built in 1912 to designs in the Renaissance Revival style by Ernest Kennedy of Minneapolis. In 1855, the 40-acre (16 ha) tract had been purchased for $50. Water company records indicate that several smaller houses once occupied the Stevens Avenue site. The owner, Edward Chenery Gale, was the son of Minneapolis pioneer real estate broker Samuel Gale. His wife, Sara Belle Pillsbury, was a daughter of Governor John S. Pillsbury. The house, now owned by the American Association of University Women, is faced in Bedford limestone. Many modern features were part of the design: a central vacuum-cleaning unit, a kitchen at ground floor level, rather than secreted in the basement, an intercom system. The house was centrally heated with a coal furnace; the decorative fireplaces were infrequently used. In the garden stands a fountain with the sculpture Boy with a Duck by Frederick MacMonnies.

.

=== Alfred F. Pillsbury House ===
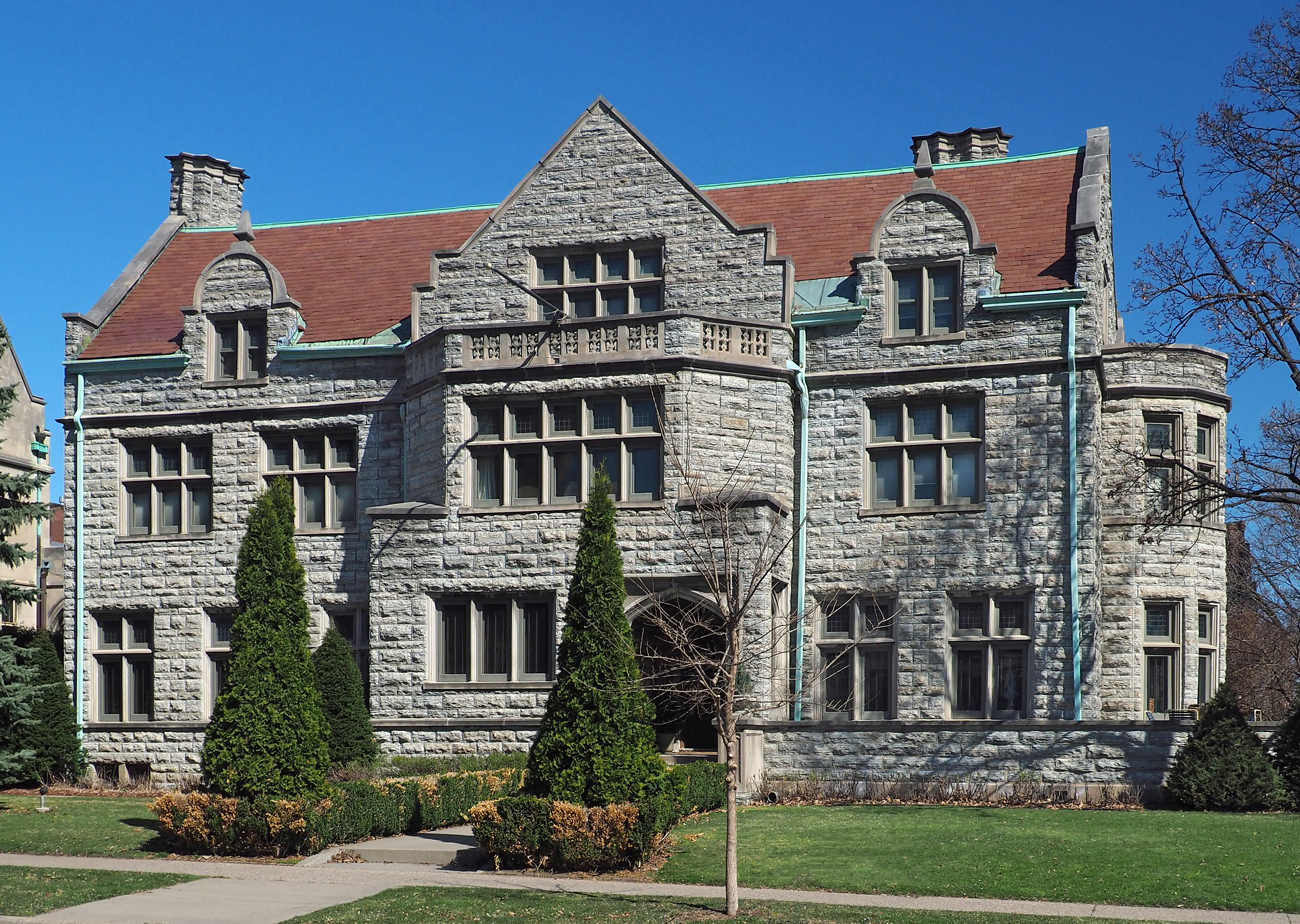
The Alfred F. Pillsbury House from the southeast

The Alfred F. Pillsbury house, at 116 22nd Street East, was designed by prominent local architect Ernest Kennedy and built in a Tudor Revival style and faced with locally quarried limestone with a dense, craggy look. Alfred F. Pillsbury, the only son of John S. Pillsbury, was an art collector who collected a number of Chinese jades now on display at the Minneapolis Institute of Art.

=== Charles S. Pillsbury House ===
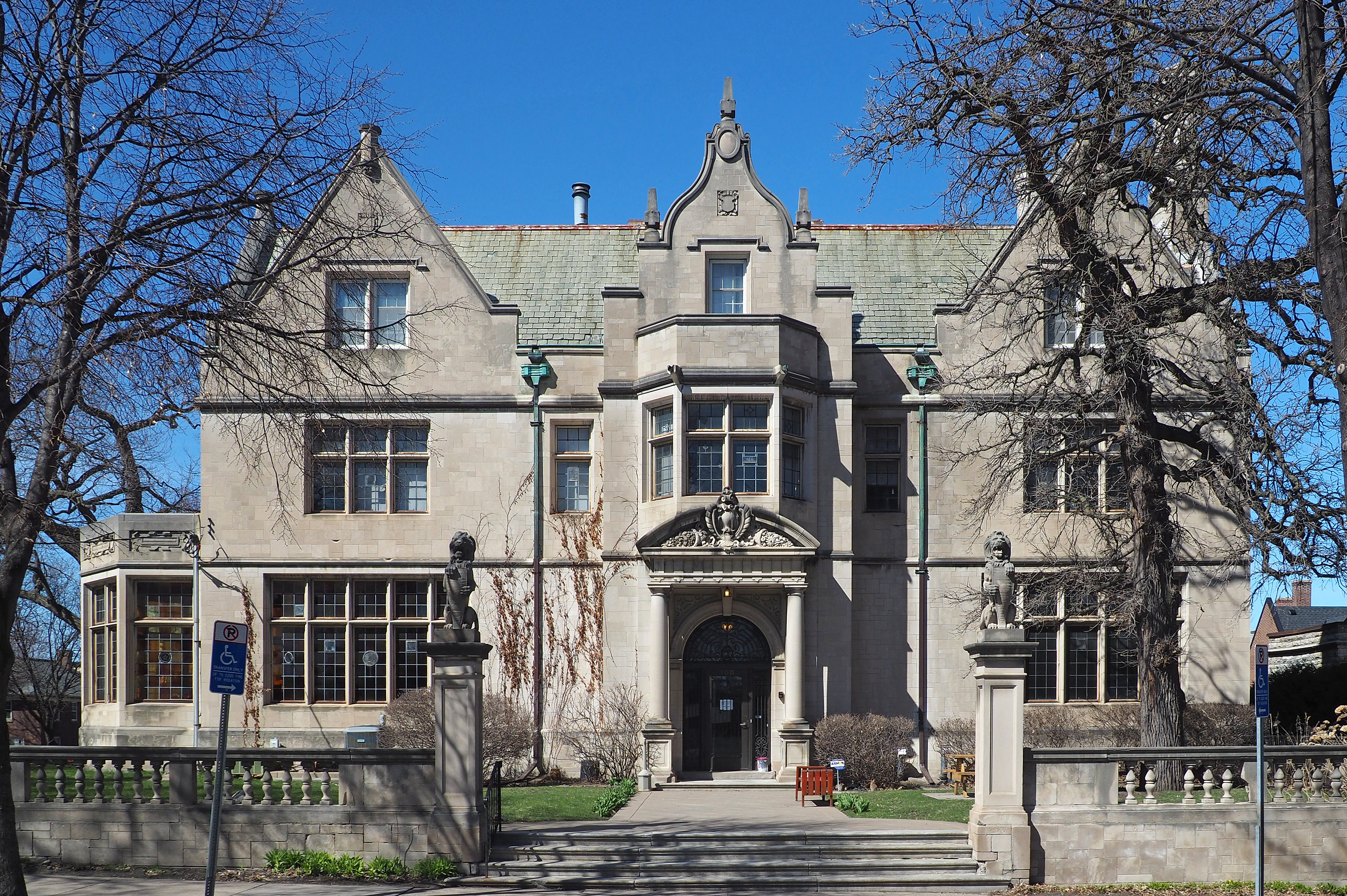
The Charles S. Pillsbury House from the south

The Charles S. Pillsbury House, at 100 22nd Street East, is also in the Tudor Revival style. The house features a polygonal conservatory, bas-relief carvings, and two statues of lions guarding the entrance gate. Charles S. Pillsbury was the son of Charles Alfred Pillsbury, the founder of the Pillsbury Company. The house is now owned by an organization that provides services for the blind.

=== John Crosby House ===
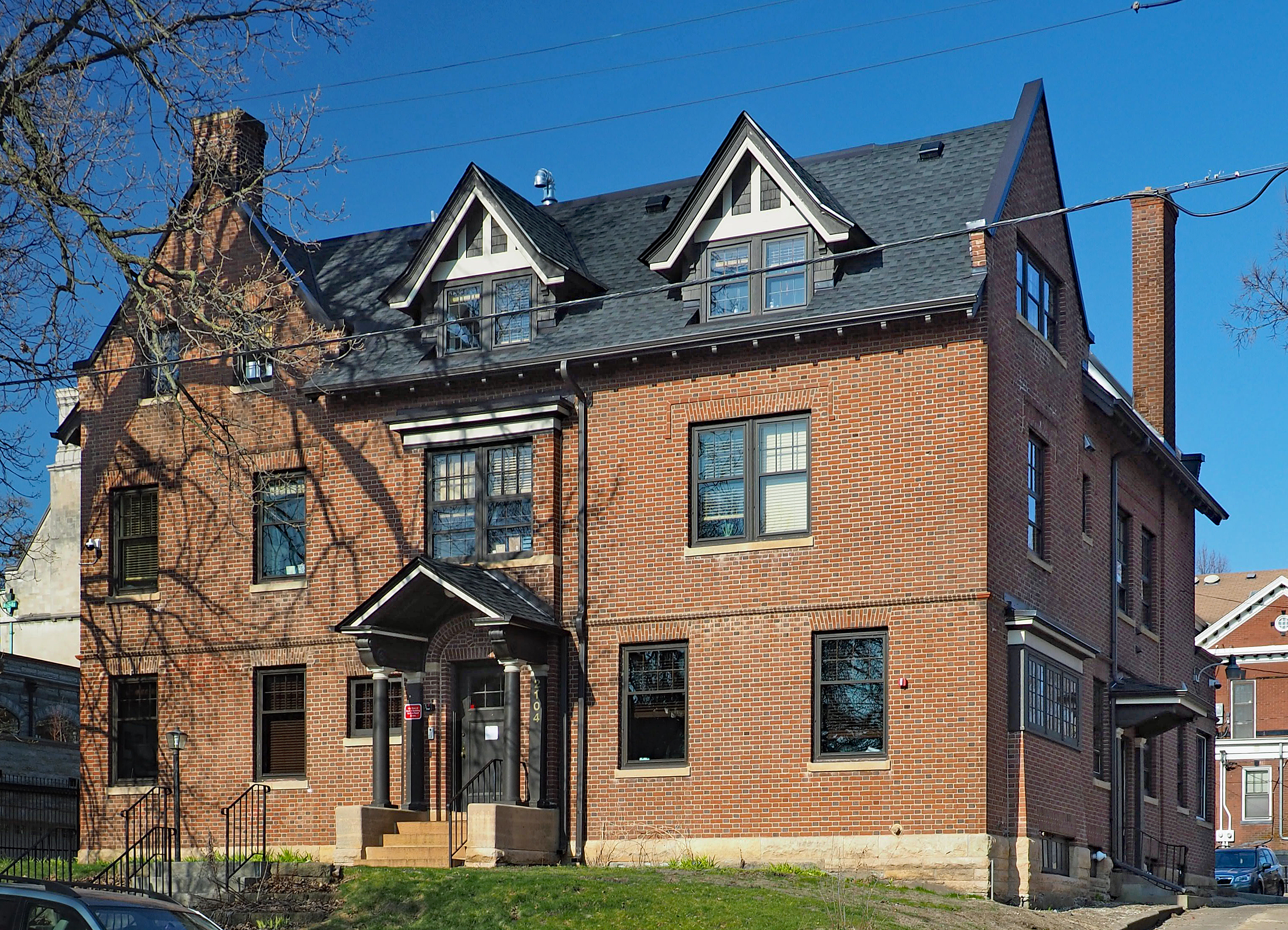
The John Crosby House from the northeast

The John Crosby House, at 2104 Stevens Avenue South, was built in 1904 for John Crosby, cofounder of the Washburn-Crosby Company, which later became General Mills. The house was designed in Colonial Revival style by William Channing Whitney.

=== Caroline Crosby House ===
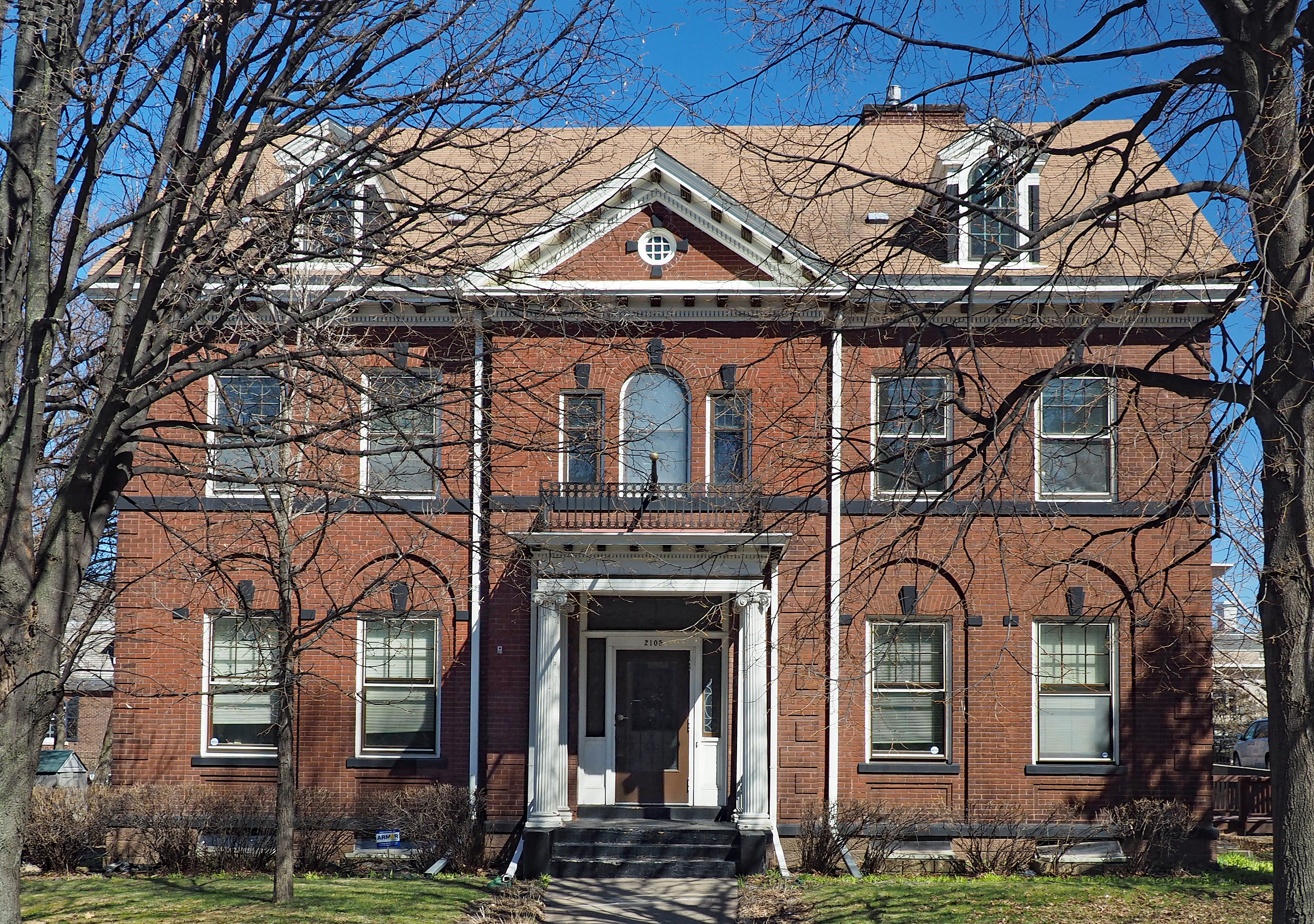
The Caroline Crosby House from the west

The Caroline Crosby House, at 2105 First Avenue South, was built by the daughter of John Crosby. The house is a brick Georgian Revival structure. The house now serves as headquarters for the Institute for Agriculture and Trade Policy.

=== Luther Farrington House ===
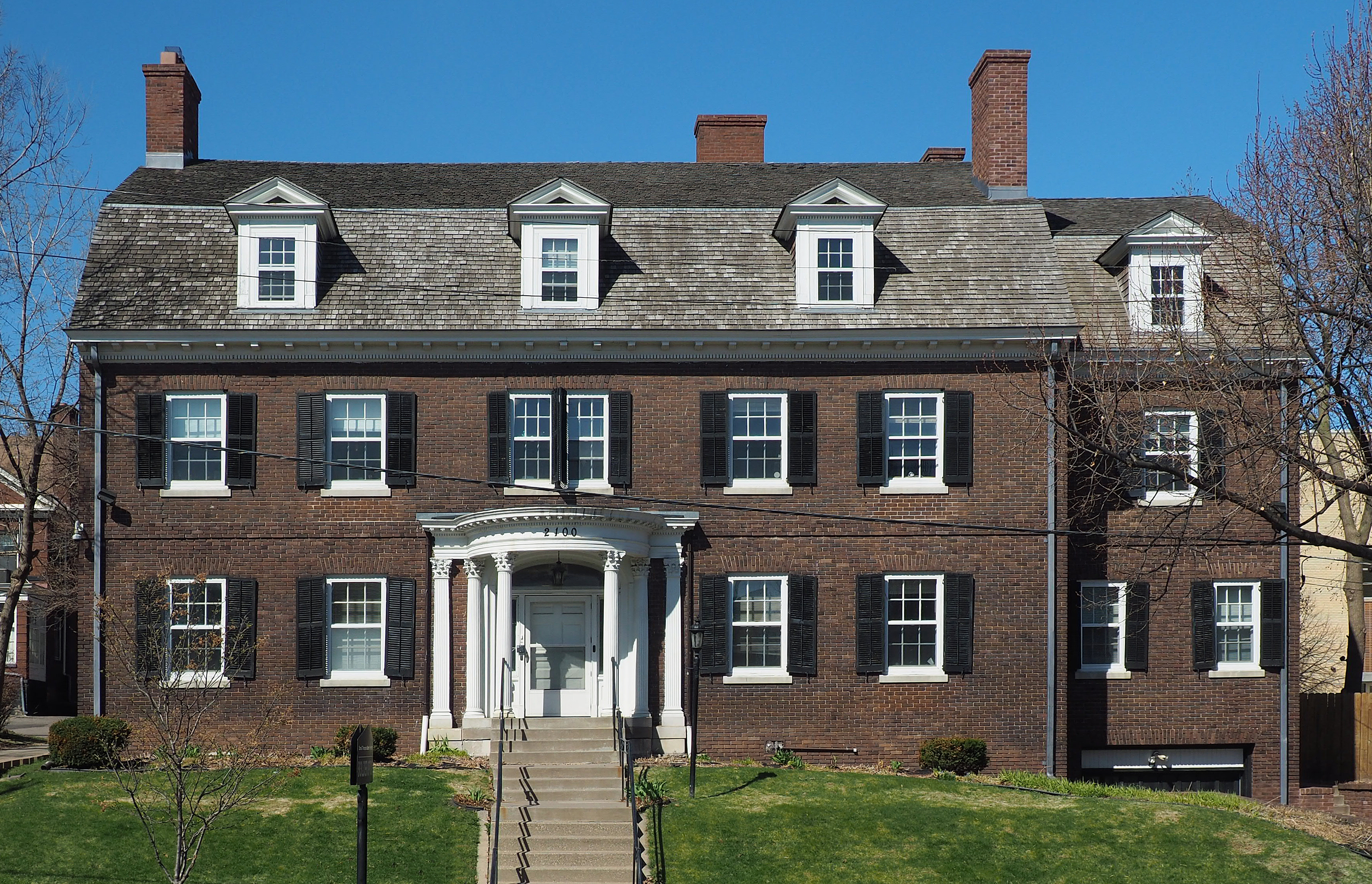
The Luther Farrington House from the east

The Luther Farrington House, at 2100 Stevens Avenue South, is also in the Georgian Revival style. The building is currently known as the Hartwell Center for Mentoring, named after John and Lucy Hartwell (also related to the Crosby family) who purchased the building and donated it to the Minneapolis Jaycees, which in turn sold it to Bolder Options, a locally based youth mentoring program.

=== George H. and Leonora Christian House / Hennepin History Museum ===
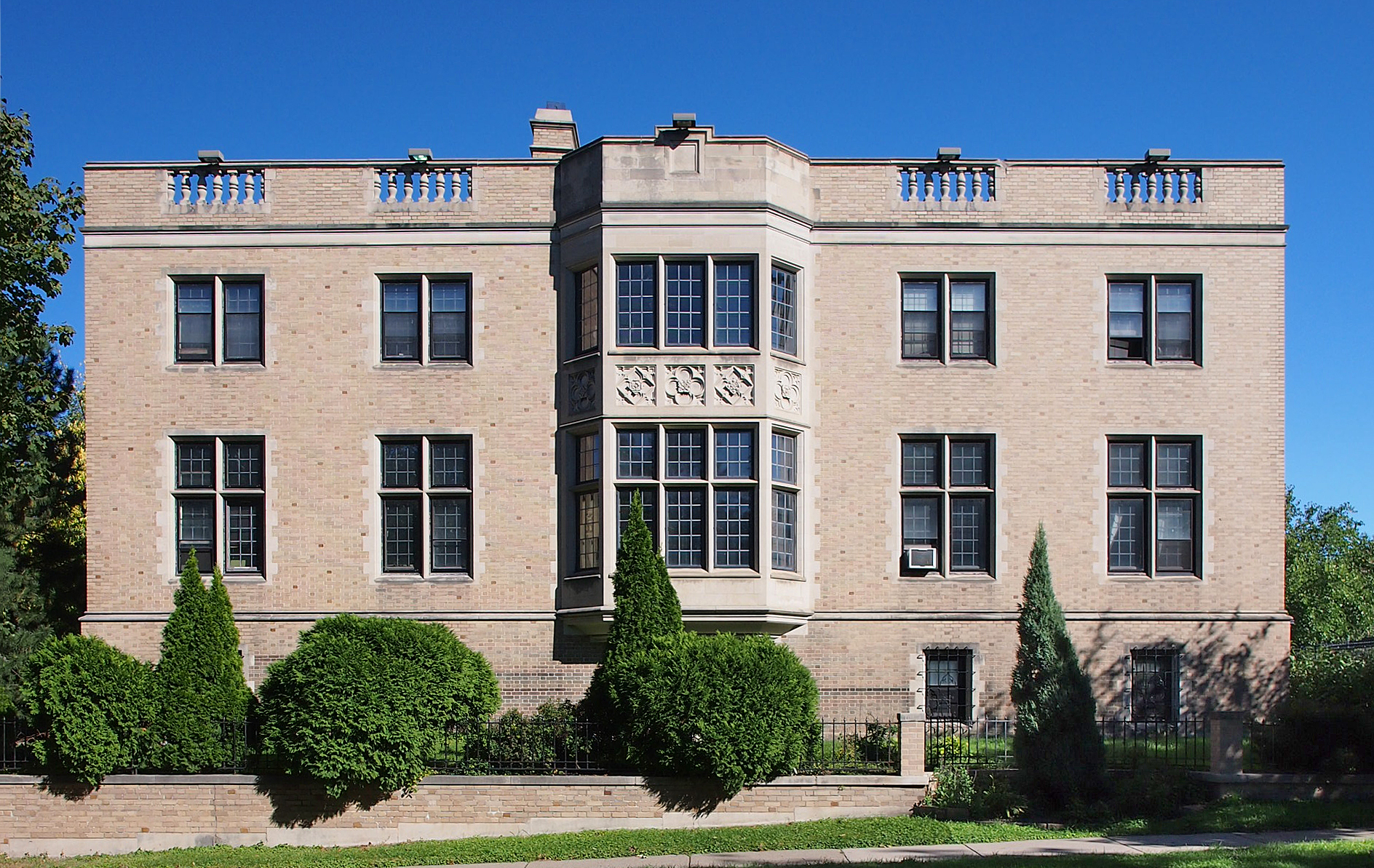
The George H. and Leonora Christian House

The Hennepin History Museum was formerly the George H. and Leonora Christian House. It was designed by local architects Hewitt and Brown using Renaissance Revival elements such as a balustraded roof. George Christian was the manager of the Washburn-Crosby milling company in the 1860s and helped to perfect the "new process" of milling hard spring wheat to make a pure white flour. This process made Minneapolis flour highly competitive with flour from other mills. The building now houses the Hennepin History Museum. The building is not listed on the National Register, but is part of the local historic district.

Before the project was finished Christian, his wife, and his son died, leaving Carolyn (also spelled Caroline) McKnight Christian, the younger Christian's widow, seven servants, and three foster children as the only occupants for the next forty years.
