= Hennepin History Museum =

History museum in Minneapolis, Minnesota, USA

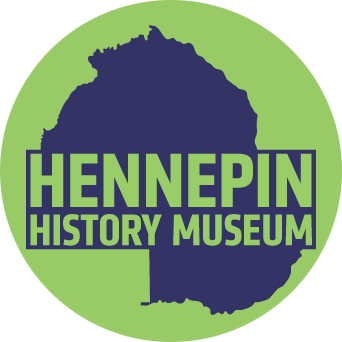

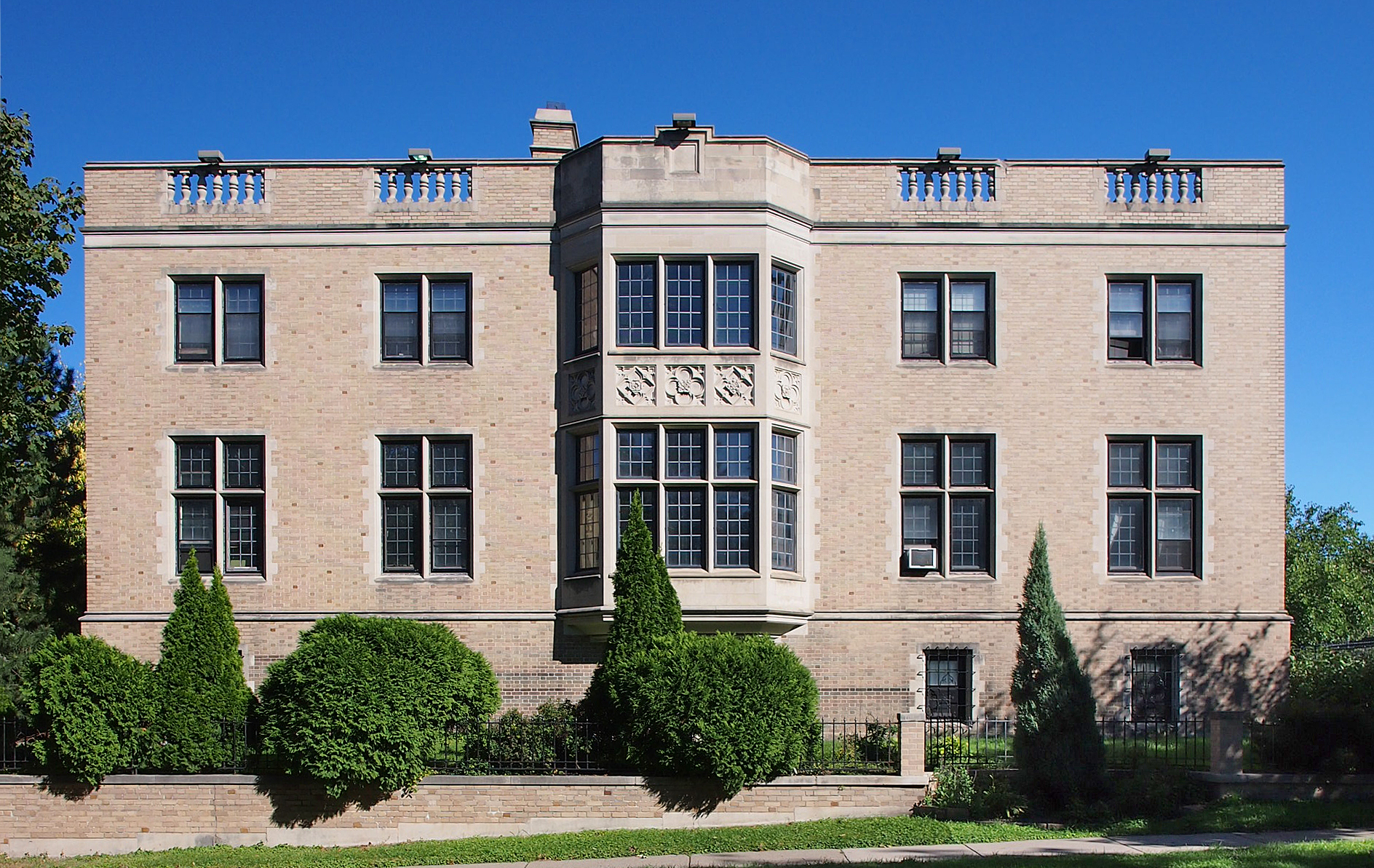
- Former name: Hennepin County Historical Society
- Established: 1938
- Location: 2303 Third Avenue South, Minneapolis, Minnesota, United States
- Coordinates: 44°57′36.5″N 93°16′21″W
- Director: John Crippen
- Website: hennepinhistory.org

Hennepin History Museum is a museum dedicated to the history, people, and communities of Hennepin County, Minnesota, United States. The museum provides in-house exhibits, history-themed programming, and social events throughout the year.

== Location ==
The museum is located in the Whittier neighborhood of Minneapolis in the historic Christian Mansion, a historic home built in 1919. Today, it is included in the Washburn-Fair Oaks Mansion District of Minneapolis, and is located on the east side of Washburn-Fair Oaks Park. The house was designed by Hennepin County architects Hewitt and Brown.

== Exhibits ==
The Hennepin History Museum features a combination of permanent and changing exhibits. The permanent collection showcases objects, artifacts, and documents that tell the story of Hennepin County from its earliest days to the present. Visitors can explore various aspects of local history, including:

- Indigenous cultures
- Early settlement and development
- Industry and commerce
- Social movements and politics
- Art and culture

== Programs ==
The museum offers a variety of public programs throughout the year, including lectures, workshops, family events, and tours. These programs provide opportunities for the community to learn more about local history and engage with the museum's collections.

== Community ==
The museum is home to a wide variety of events, including monthly "Fireside Chats" on various historical topics, as well as social events and author talks.

The museum has also worked to spotlight various communities in Hennepin County. In 2003, the museum partnered with the Walker Art Museum and 30 East African students from local high schools to use letters and photographs to create an exhibit about East African communities in Minneapolis. The museum's cultural outreach continued in 2009, when University of Minnesota interior design students exhibited designs for culturally sensitive homes for Somali and Mexican immigrants.

== Library ==
The museum's library is open to the community and highlights the museum's archival collections. The library has reference materials such as city directories, photos of houses and buildings, maps, atlases, genealogical resources, city history files, business histories, and many other reference materials. A professional archivist is on site during library open hours to assist researchers.

== Funding ==
About 40% of the museum's annual budget is funded by Hennepin County. The remaining 60% is funded by individual donors.

== Magazine ==
Three times a year, the museum publishes Hennepin History Magazine. Redesigned in 2017, the magazine features topics of interest from all over Hennepin County. Digital reproductions of Hennepin History, the official publication of the Hennepin History Museum, are available online thanks to the Hennepin County Library Digital Collections. Earlier issues included articles such as "The Birth of Target", which explores the history of the Target Corporation, placing it in a historical context with the Dayton family and their department store Daytons. Such examinations of local companies are common in the magazine; the Winter 2012 issue explored Northwest Airlines in the 1930s.

== See also ==
- Arts in Minneapolis, Minnesota
- List of museums in Minnesota
