= The Royal Abbey of Saint-Denis =

1987 book by Sumner McKnight Crosby

- Author: Sumner McKnight Crosby
- Language: English
- Publisher: Yale University Press
- Publication date: 1987
- Publication place: United States
- Media type: Print
- Pages: 525
- ISBN: 0-300-03143-2
- OCLC: 12805708
- Dewey Decimal: 726/.5/0944362 19
- LC Class: NA5551.S214 C76 1987

The Royal Abbey of Saint-Denis from its Beginnings to the Death of Suger, 475-1151 is a 1987 book about the history of the Royal Abbey of Saint-Denis by Sumner McKnight Crosby.
