= Whittier, Minneapolis =

Whittier
- Neighborhood
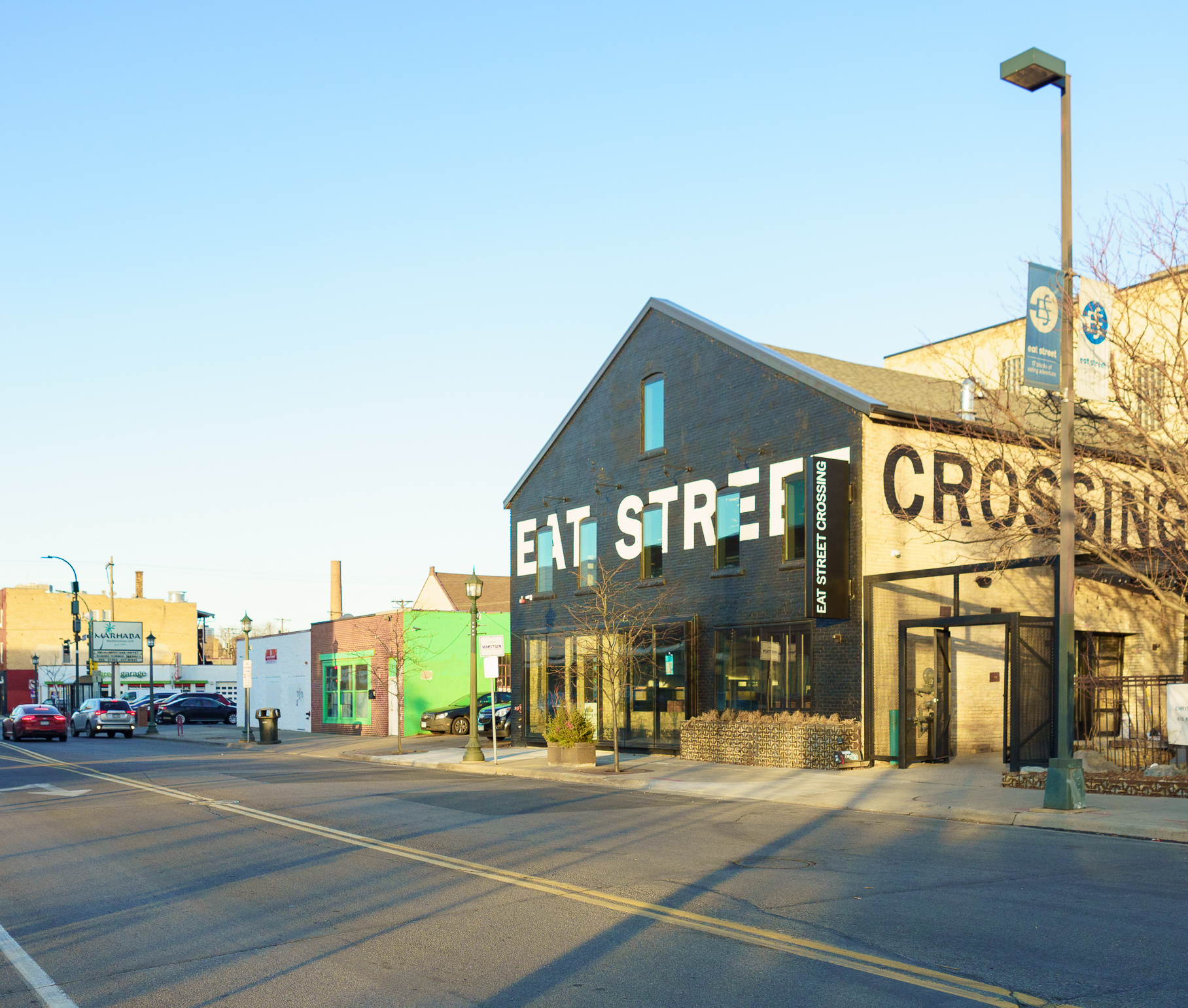
- Eat Street on Nicollet Ave
- Nickname: Eat Street
- Motto: The International Neighborhood
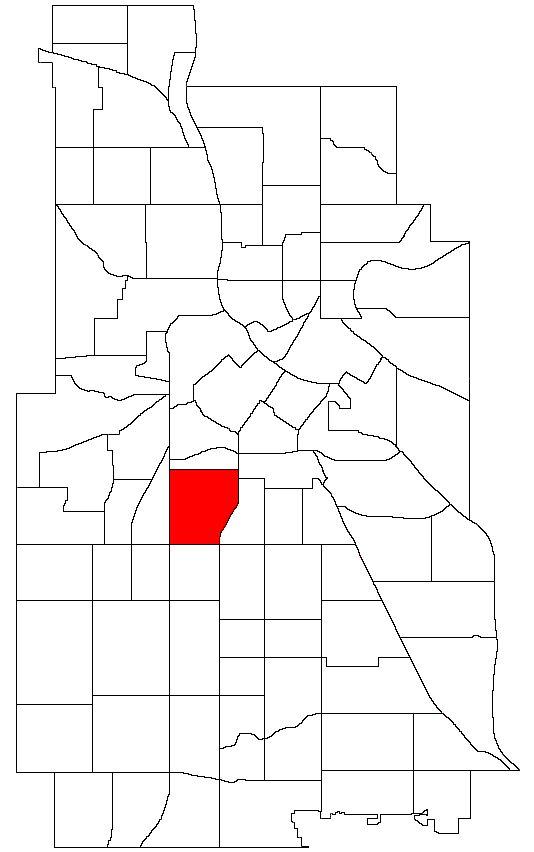
- Location of Whittier within the U.S. city of Minneapolis
- Interactive map of Whittier
- Coordinates: 44°57′20″N 93°16′40″W
- Country: United States
- State: Minnesota
- County: Hennepin
- City: Minneapolis
- Community: Powderhorn
- Founded: 1849
- Established: 1977
- Founder: John Blaisdell
- Named for: John Greenleaf Whittier
- City Council Ward: 10

Government
  - Council Member: Aisha Chughtai

Area
  - Total: 0.816 sq mi (2.11 km^{2})
- Elevation: 866 ft (264 m)

Population (2020)
  - Total: 14,483
  - Density: 17,700/sq mi (6,850/km^{2})
- Time zone: UTC-6 (CST)
  - Summer (DST): UTC-5 (CDT)
- Postal code: 55404, 55405, 55408
- Area code: 612
- Website: http://www.whittieralliance.org/

Whittier is a neighborhood within the Powderhorn community in the U.S. city of Minneapolis, Minnesota, bounded by Franklin Avenue on the north, Interstate 35W on the east, Lake Street on the south, and Lyndale Avenue on the west. It is known for its many diverse restaurants, coffee shops and Asian markets, especially along Nicollet Avenue (also known as "Eat Street"). The neighborhood is home to the Minneapolis Institute of Art, the Minneapolis College of Art and Design, and the Children's Theatre Company.

While the neighborhood is officially part of the greater Powderhorn community, it is separated from most of those areas by Interstate 35W, and also lies further north than the rest of the community area. Most of Powderhorn is east of Interstate 35W and south of Lake Street; the Whittier neighborhood is west of I-35W and north of Lake Street. Whittier is often associated with adjacent neighborhoods, such as Lowry Hill East in the Calhoun-Isles community to the west and Stevens Square neighborhood in the Central community to the north.

== History ==
In the 1800s, Mdewakanton Dakota occupied the area from Saint Anthony Falls toward the Minnesota River following their migration from Mille Lacs Lake and the onward expansion of the quarreling Ojibwa. Temporary Dakota camps were photographed in Whittier which are in the MNHS catalog.

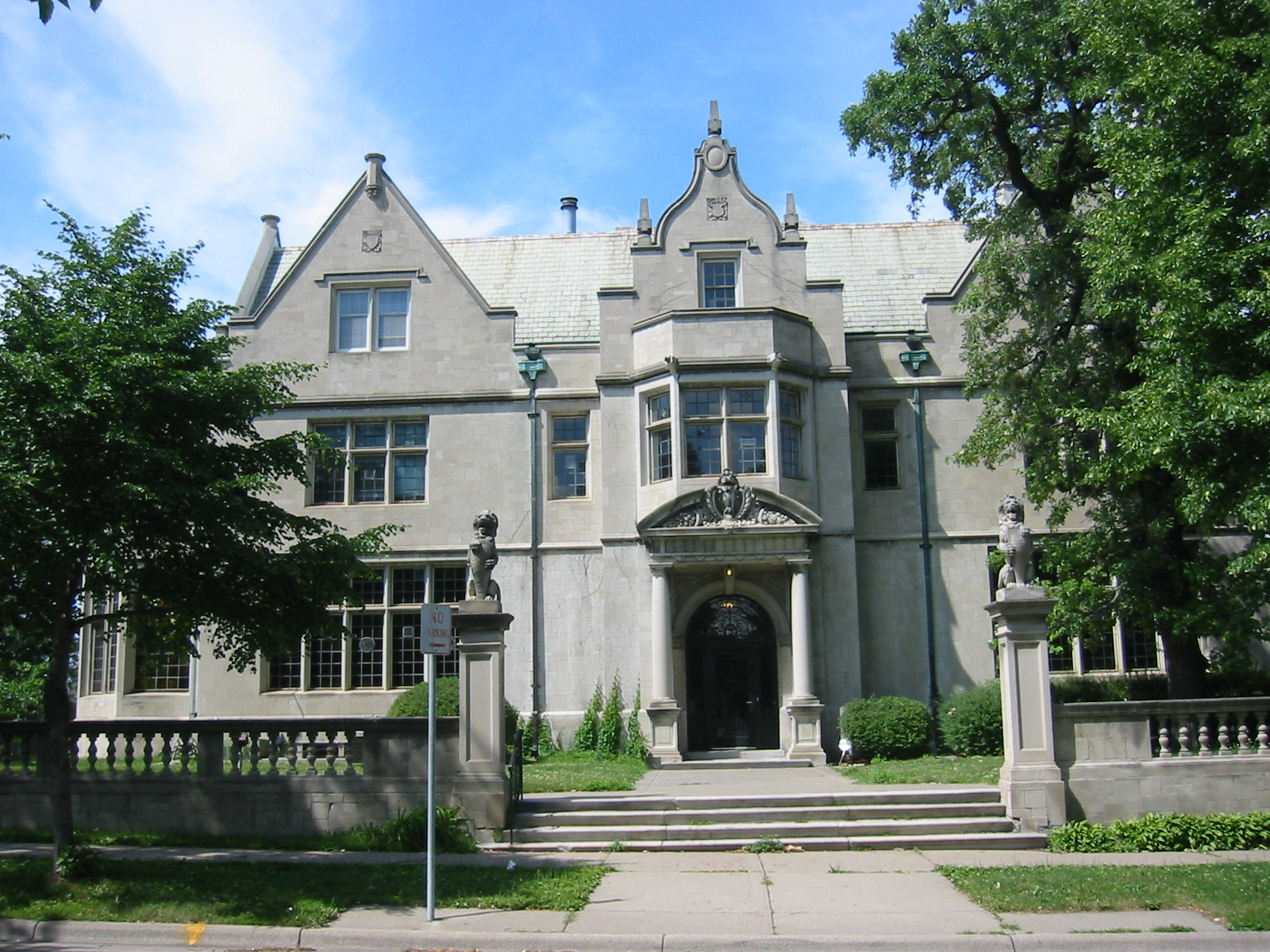
The Charles S. Pillsbury mansion built in 1913 at 100 22nd Street East in the Washburn-Fair Oaks Mansion District. He was one of two sons of Charles Alfred Pillsbury, the founder of the Pillsbury Company and Pillsbury "A" Mill.

In 1849 at the age of 21, John T. Blaisdell moved from Maine and squatted on land just south of downtown Minneapolis. His brothers eventually came and together they lived in a log house which became Blaisdell School.

Following the 1851 Treaty of Traverse des Sioux which expropriated lands to the United States, Blaisdell developed the area south of Downtown Minneapolis into Blaisdell's Addition. For capital, he sold timber to the booming lumber industry and leased land for the Morrison Farm in the east, which the Morrisons eventually purchased.

=== Blaisdell to Whittier ===
After the Blaisdell brothers returned from the Civil War in 1865, Minneapolis began growing in population again. Annexations in 1867 and 1883 turned Blaisdell's Addition into South Minneapolis. Entrepreneurs and businessmen soon moved out of Downtown East and built their mansions in the present Washburn-Fair Oaks Mansion District. Much of the Morrison's farm was sold for this expansion. Fair Oaks Park, at the center of this district, was formerly the site of William D. Washburn's mansion. Meanwhile, the southern end of Whittier grew as an agricultural and industrial job center with working-class housing along the Hastings and Dakota tracks of the Milwaukee Road rail line along 29th Street which shipped grain from southern Minnesota. Blaisdell Road became Blaisdell Avenue, extending past the neighborhood to the southern boundaries.

In 1882, Blaisdell built his manor at Nicollet and 24th Street West. The family moved out of Blaisdell School. A year later, Blaisdell, Longfellow and Irving Schools across the southern prairie were annexed to the Minneapolis school system from Hennepin County. In naming tradition with the other schools, the board renamed the school Whittier after the 19th century poet and abolitionist, John Greenleaf Whittier. Like other areas of the city, families would soon call their neighborhoods after the primary school. Called the "millionaire pioneer of the city" by the New York Times, John T. Blaisdell died in 1898.

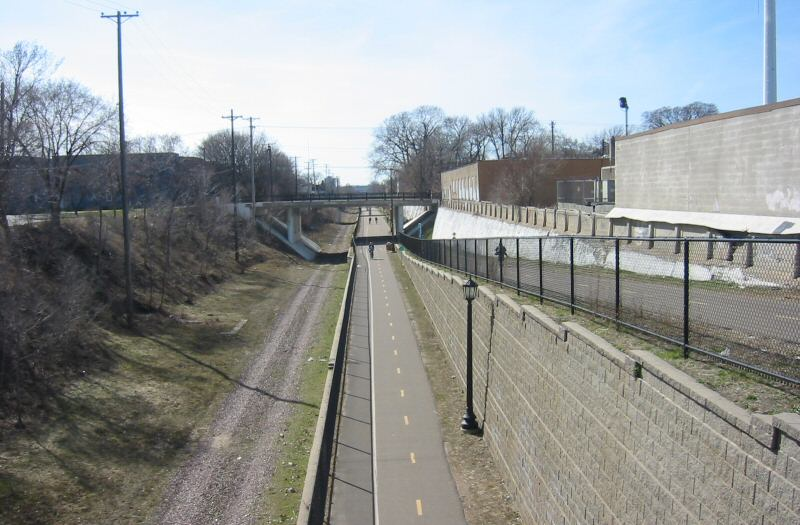
Midtown Greenway at Nicollet Avenue looking west

Into the 20th century, Thomas Lowry and his partners assumed control of the insolvent McCrory's Motor Line. Whittier filled along Lowry's new Nicollet Ave. and 4th Ave. streetcar routes. The increasingly residential nature of southern Minneapolis brought contention with the Milwaukee Road as neighbors petitioned the City Council from 1905 to 1909 to alleviate the effects of the crossings which was blamed for several deaths. The Milwaukee Road offered a failed proposal to elevate the tracks and returned with a $1.3 million plan to depress the tracks and construct a dozen road bridges. After a legal battle with the businesses affected by loss of rail access, the project was upheld and completed in 1916.

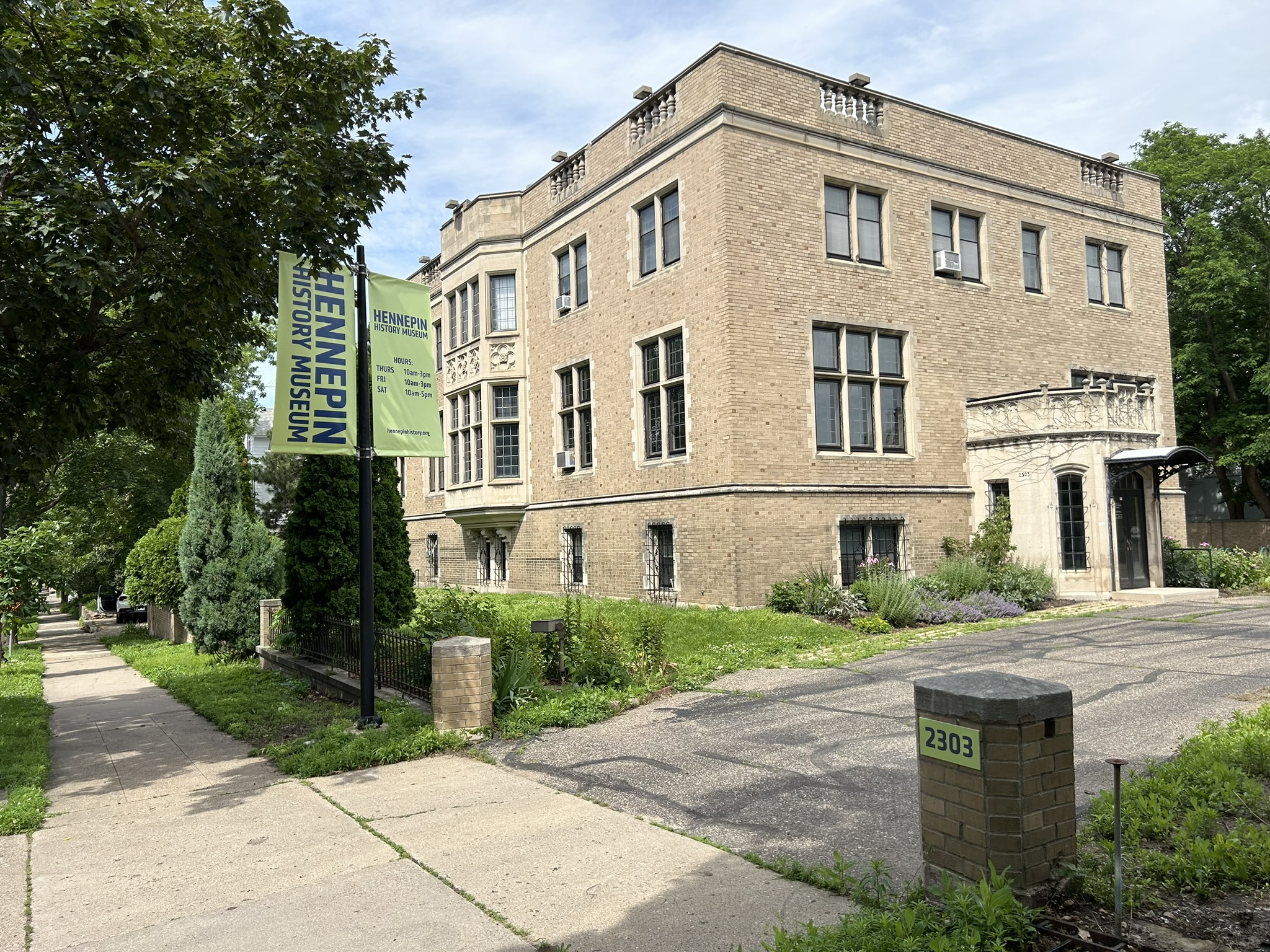
Hennepin History Museum in the Whittier Neighborhood of Minneapolis, Minnesota.

=== Post-war decline ===
The neighborhood maintained a dense population and high rental occupancy up towards the city's population peak in the 1950s. In 1958, Hennepin History Museum moved into the Christian family residence across from Washburn Fair Oaks Park. The latter 20th century followed with other inner core neighborhoods as the postwar boom of the 1960s depleted Whittier's population. The routing of Interstate 35W was modified following city concerns over expensive land acquisition of apartments and mansions including the Minneapolis Institute of Arts. In November 1967, Interstate 35W was built around the neighborhood to spare the Mansion District which was later preserved in its current historic district.

Whittier experienced decline as middle-class residents moved out. The demolition of Nicollet Ball Park in Lyndale neighborhood led to retail failure on the neighborhood's south end. Abandoned buildings and adult bookstores prompted the city to establish the Nicollet/Lake Economic Development District in 1972. Several years passed without activity as Target and Herberger's refused to build. K-Mart finally agreed to become a tenant on the grounds that the City close Nicollet Avenue at Lake Street, and the project was done in 1978.

However a boon for the city, the closing accelerated the neighborhood's problems and Nicollet north of Lake Street was stifled of car traffic. Crime and prostitution became common. Neighbors who stayed had formed a neighborhood association in response to bitter protests over the K-Mart project. The Whittier Alliance (WA) was established in 1977 to monitor the weakened community and rehabilitate housing. WA operated as a Community Development Corporation, developing housing for many years in order to sustain its operations in community outreach. The City attempted to bring about a citizen participation model to assist neighborhoods until with the Legislature's assistance created the Neighborhood Revitalization Program in 1987 to formally address urban issues with funding. The city began designating official neighborhood boundaries at this time and Whittier was formalized.

=== Millennial rebirth ===
Several factors had sown seeds for Whittier's comeback from the post-war suburban flight. Nicollet Avenue had not suffered completely. An authentic German restaurant, the Black Forest Inn, opened in 1965 at the corner of 26th and Nicollet, becoming the avenue's main restaurant anchor for decades. As Whittier gained a bohemian culture for its cheap housing, the Artist Quarter jazz club was opened in the 1970s on the adjoining corner establishing a music anchor in the region. During this time, Chinese and Vietnamese businesses began opening on Nicollet following the Vietnam War. The Hip Sing Tong branch headquarters at 2633 Nicollet may explain the presence. Mexican businesses too opened but later in the 1980s on as they became a growing proportion of the immigrant population.

Recognizing the street's potential, the Whittier Alliance and Business Association created a new branding scheme called Eat Street. It was completed in 1997 with a street scape reconstruction along the entire corridor. The abandoned Milwaukee Road trench also gained renewed interest during this time for re-use as a rails to trails transportation corridor. The Midtown Community Works and Midtown Greenway Coalition formed and federal funds were acquired for redevelopment. The first phase of the new Midtown Greenway was built in 1999 and entirely finished in Minneapolis by 2005. In the 2000s, after nearly two decades of private sector disinvestment, three major condominium projects were completed along Nicollet Avenue. In 2011 a major development came to the corner of 26th and Nicollet including a major indoor climbing facility and several new restaurants. In 2012, Whittier Alliance and the City of Minneapolis began working to move Kmart and restore Nicollet Avenue including a possible streetcar system. In 2020, amidst the COVID-19 pandemic, K-Mart shuttered their doors, closing the last remaining store in the state. In 2023, the K-Mart was demolished and as of April 2024, plans are underway for new Nicollet Redevelopment.

=== Operation Metro Surge ===
On January 24, 2026, during Operation Metro Surge, Alex Pretti was killed after being shot multiple times by Border Patrol agents at the intersection of 26th Street and Nicollet Avenue in Whittier. In response, hundreds of Whittier residents gathered in protest. The Minnesota National Guard was activated to assist local police in monitoring the protests, and a vehicle perimeter between I-35W and Pillsbury Ave., and Franklin Ave. and 28th Street was established to control traffic in the area.

== Demographics ==
Historical population
Census	Pop.	Note	%±
1980	12,729		—
1990	13,051		2.5%
2000	15,247		16.8%
2010	13,689		−10.2%
2020	15,030		9.8%

The population of Whittier is 14,483. The neighborhood is 52.8% non-Hispanic White, 23.3% Black, 13.6% Hispanic or Latino, 3.5% Asian, and 6.8% other. The top five single ancestries in 2000 were German (1,780 people), Sub-Saharan African (1,070 people), Norwegian (870 people), Irish (830 people), and Somali (490 people).

About 82% of households rent. As of 2020, Whittier is the second most populous and sixth most dense neighborhood in Minneapolis.

Race/ethnicity
Race/ethnicity	2000		2010		2020	
Race/ethnicity	Number	%	Number	%	Number	%
White alone	7,129	46.76	7,017	51.26	7,253	48.26
Black alone	2,998	19.66	2,709	19.79	3,988	26.53
Hispanic or Latino (any race)	3,299	21.64	2,734	19.97	2,207	14.68
Native American alone	284	1.86	253	1.85	204	1.36
Asian alone	817	5.36	534	3.90	542	3.61
Other race alone	33	0.22	29	0.21	74	0.49
Pacific Islander alone	13	0.09	1	0.01	6	0.04
Two or more races	674	4.42	412	3.01	756	5.03
Total	15,247	100.0	13,689	100.0	15,030	100.0

== Government ==
Whittier was part of Ward 6 until redistricting in 2013, which placed Whittier in Ward 10. Ward 10 is currently represented by Minneapolis City Council Member Aisha Chughtai. The neighborhood is currently officially represented by the Whittier Alliance, a community organization founded in 1977, which is recognized by the City of Minneapolis and its Neighborhood Revitalization Program (NRP). These NRP funds allow the Whittier Alliance to work with individuals, families, and businesses to build the community in terms of safety, economic development, and livability. Another informal organization is the Whittier Neighbors, founded in 1996. The Fifth Police Precinct serves the neighborhood under Sector One.

Whittier is in Minnesota Senate District 62, represented by Omar Fateh, and in Minnesota House district 62A, represented by Aisha Gomez. Minneapolis Public Schools Area 23.

== Arts and culture ==
=== 2218 Minneapolis ===
In 1941, relatives of Cadwallader C. Washburn sold their residence at 2218 First Avenue South to Alcoholics Anonymous (AA). The house became known as 2218 Minneapolis, and the local AA chapter formed an Alano society to manage the building and its grounds. 2218 Minneapolis serves as a meeting place for AA members as well as a place of refuge and support for those with alcoholism. Since its expansion in 1950, 2218 Minneapolis has hosted large regional events, notable speakers, and encouraged the founding of statewide AA chapters.

== Education ==
The Minneapolis College of Art and Design (MCAD) is in Whittier.

In the 1990s, the City of Lakes Waldorf School and Watershed High School moved into Whittier. Both schools renovated the American Hardware Mutual Insurance Company building (constructed 1922) at the corner of 24th Street and Nicollet Avenue. Behind this building, at the corner of 24th Street and Blaisdell Avenue, the "play yard" occupies the former site of a Dayton's family mansion. Whittier School had moved to Blaisdell Avenue and closed in the 1960s.

After the departure of Whittier High, the Whittier Alliance led an effort with its NRP capital to build the new Whittier International Elementary School, constructed on the east half of Whittier Park in 2001. This public school serves a population of 350 students in grades K-5.

The Minneapolis Japanese School, a weekend Japanese educational program designated by the Japanese Ministry of Education, previously held its classes at MCAD.
