= John Crosby (General Mills) =

American businessman

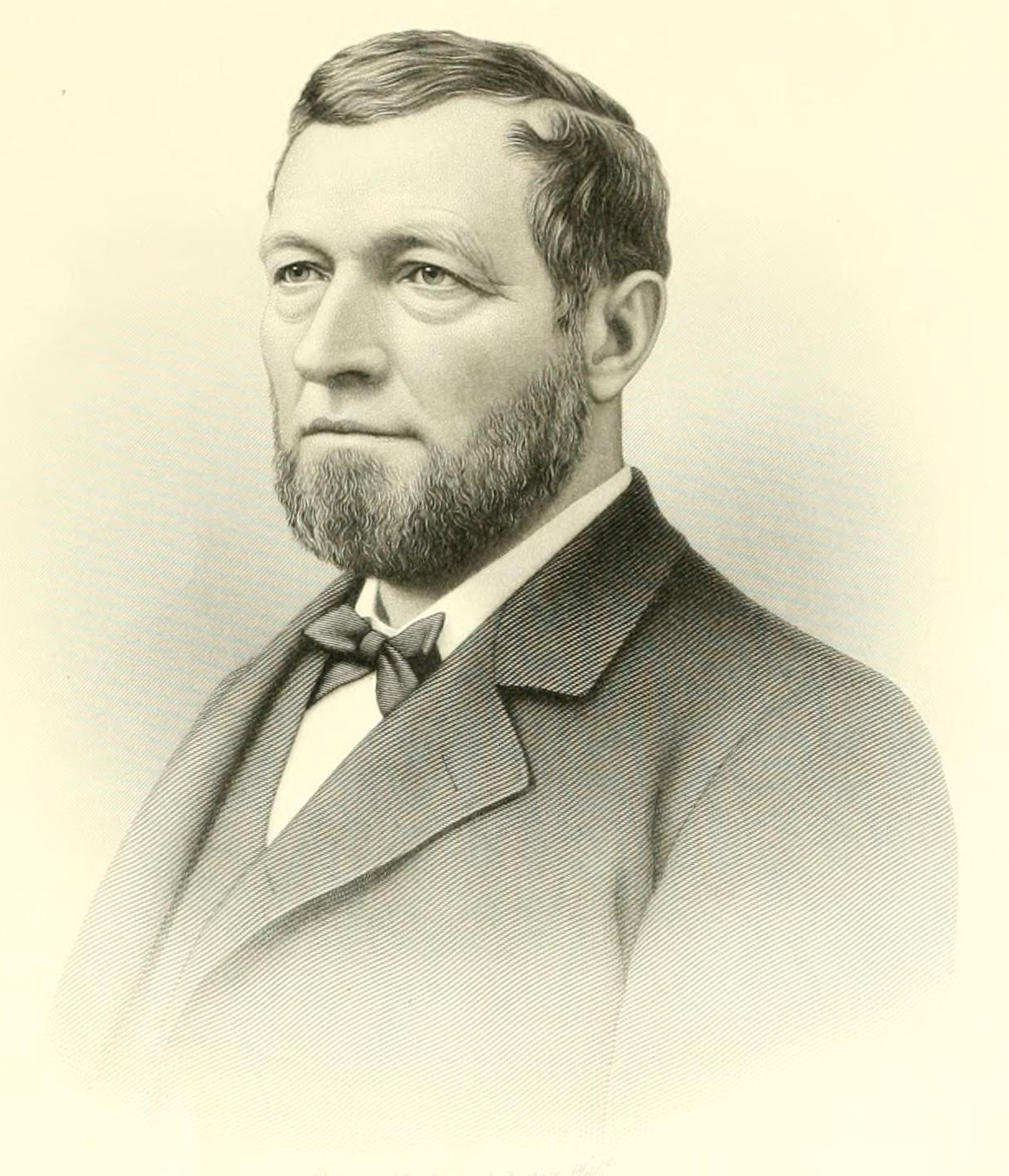
- Born: John Crosby III; November 1, 1828; Hampden, Maine, United States
- Died: December 29, 1887 (aged 59); Minneapolis, Minnesota, United States
- Burial place: Lakewood Cemetery
- Occupation: Businessman
- Known for: Founder of Washburn-Crosby Company, the forerunner to General Mills
- Spouse(s): Olive Loring Muzzy (m. 1866-1873); Emma Gilson (m. 1879-1887)
- Children: 3
- Relatives: Franklin Muzzy (father-in-law); Sumner McKnight Crosby (grandson)

John Crosby III (November 1, 1828 – December 29, 1887) was an American businessman. Crosby was a founding partner of the Washburn-Crosby Company, the forerunner to General Mills.

== Career ==
Born in Hampden, Maine, to John II and Anne K. Stetson, Crosby became heavily involved in the family paper mill business, as well as an iron foundry and machine shop in nearby Bangor. He then moved to Minneapolis in 1877 and became involved in the milling industry there. Crosby purchased an interest in the Washburn "B" Mill, a predecessor to the Washburn "A" Mill, and developed a business partnership with Cadwallader C. Washburn, inventor of the middlings purifier, as well as a silent partnership with William Hood Dunwoody. In that year, they formed the Washburn-Crosby Company to produce winter wheat, and Crosby oversaw its expansion.

== Legacy ==
Crosby remained a partner of the Washburn-Crosby Company until his death in 1887. He was buried at Lakewood Cemetery. One of Crosby's sons, Franklin, took over the role for the business. The company became the forerunner to General Mills.

In 1924, Washburn-Crosby purchased the WLAG radio station and renamed it to WCCO, in honor of Crosby and his company. The station was used by Betty Crocker.

== Personal life ==
In 1866, Crosby married Olive Loring Muzzy, daughter of Franklin Muzzy, a noted politician. The couple had three children: Caroline, Franklin, and John IV. The marriage lasted until the death of Muzzy in 1873, and Crosby married his second wife, Emma Gilson, six years later.

Through his son Franklin, Crosby is the great-grandfather of Sumner McKnight Crosby, a noted art historian.
