= Luther Moore =

American politician

Luther Sanborn Moore
- Born: August 14, 1821
- Died: January 14, 1892 (aged 70)
- Occupations: politician, farmer and lawyer
- Known for: President of the Maine Senate

Luther Sandborn Moore (August 14, 1821 – January 14, 1892) was an American politician, farmer and lawyer from Maine. Moore served two single-year terms in the Maine Senate (1853, 1854) and one in the Maine House of Representatives (1858). During his second term in the Senate (1854), he was Senate President.

Moore was a graduate of Limerick Academy and Harvard Law School. He was an associate of future United States Supreme Court Justice Nathan Clifford, also of Maine. Moore practiced law and farmed in Limerick, Maine. Following the creation of what is now the University of Maine, he served on its board of trustees. His daughter, Anne Carroll Moore, was an acclaimed librarian, educator, writer and advocate for children.
