= Seven Points =

Seven Points may refer to:

- Seven Points (Minnesota), an indoor shopping mall in the U.S. city of Minneapolis
- Seven Points, Texas, a U.S. city

== See also ==
- Westminster, Texas, a U.S. city formerly known as Seven Points
