= 2021 Uptown Minneapolis unrest =

Protests after the police killing of Winston Boogie Smith, beginning June 2021

- Part of 2020–2023 Minneapolis–Saint Paul racial unrest
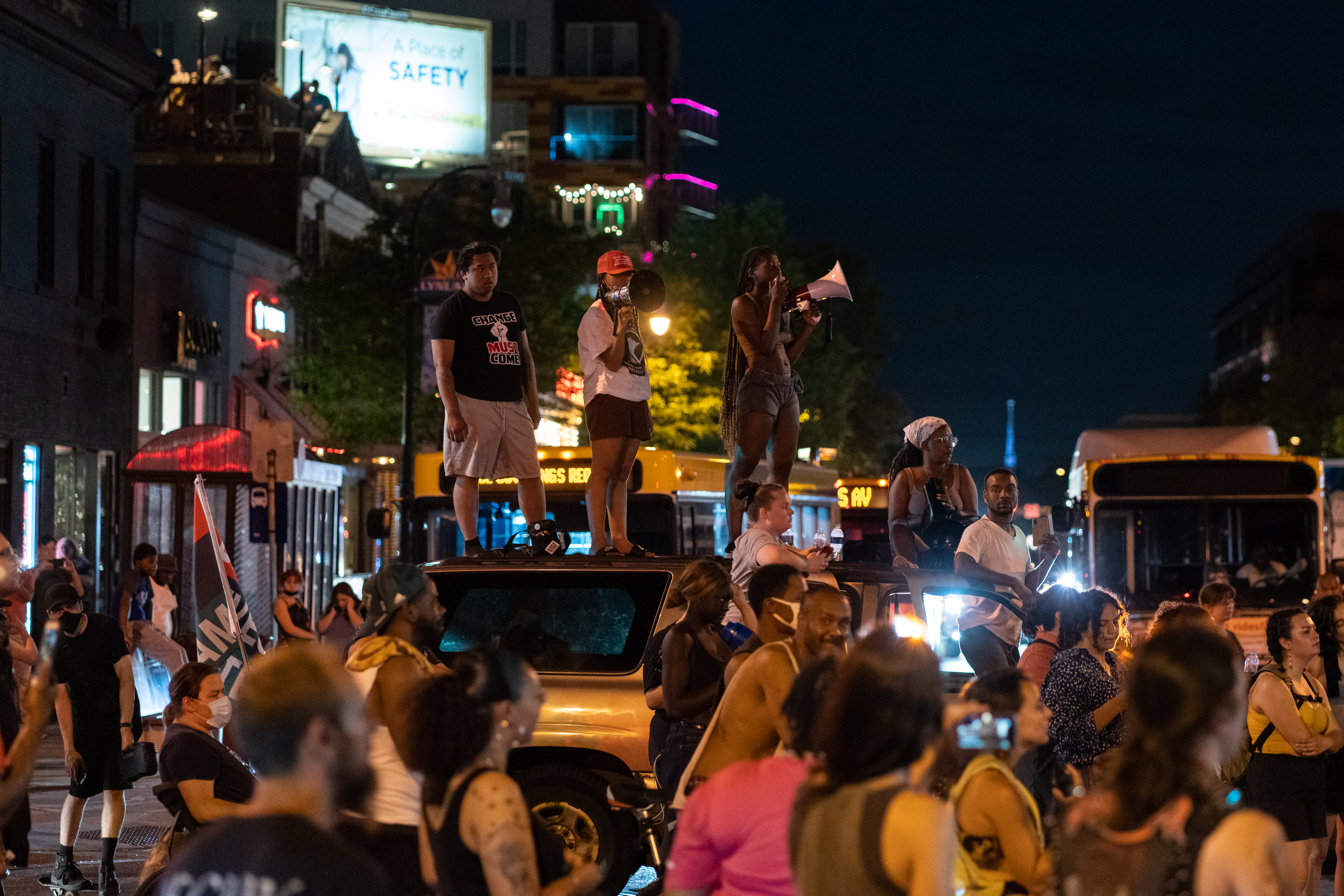
- Protesters in Minneapolis, June 5, 2021
- Date: June 3 – November 3, 2021 (5 months)
- Location: Minneapolis, Minnesota, United States; 44.947104°N 93.296784°W
- Caused by: Prolonged local unrest; Killing of Winston Boogie Smith; Killing of Deona Marie Knajdek
- Goals: Police accountability; Justice for Winston Boogie Smith; Justice for Deona Marie Knajdek
- Methods: Protests, demonstrations, civil disobedience, civil resistance, graffiti, street occupation, guerrilla gardening, riots, looting
- Status: Protest gardens removed July 14, 2021

Casualties
- Death: Deona Marie Knajdek killed in a vehicle-ramming attack
- Injuries: 4; 3 protesters injured in vehicle-ramming attack; Driver of vehicle injured
- Arrested: At least 48; Driver of vehicle in ramming attack; At least 47 arrested in relation to unrest
- Damage: Over 12 businesses
- Charged: 3

Civil unrest began in the Uptown district of the U.S. city of Minneapolis on June 3, 2021, as a reaction to news reports that law enforcement officers had killed a wanted suspect during an arrest. The law enforcement killing occurred atop a parking ramp near West Lake Street and Girard Avenue. Police fired several rounds, killing the person at the scene. In an initial statement about the encounter, the U.S. Marshals Service alleged that a person failed to comply with arresting officers and produced a gun. Crowds gathered on West Lake Street near the parking ramp soon afterwards as few details were known about the incident or the deceased person, who was later identified as Winston Boogie Smith, a 32-year-old black American man.

An initial period of civil disorder occurred over four nights along a three-block stretch of West Lake Street. Several business were vandalized during the overnight hours of June 3 and 4, resulting in several arrests. Protests were held over subsequent days with demonstrators periodically occupying a street intersection near where Smith was killed. There was no known video evidence of the police encounter with Smith, and an attorney for the passenger in Smith's car and protesters disputed the law enforcement account of events. The night of June 13, a protester, Deona Marie Knajdek, was killed when a vehicle rammed into a demonstration in the street. Over the next several days, demonstrators attempted to reoccupy a portion of the street and erected makeshift barricades that were removed by Minneapolis police officers. Minnesota Governor Tim Walz activated the state's National Guard on standby orders for possible deployment to Minneapolis.

Nightly demonstrations were held through mid July and unrest continued for several more weeks, which disrupted local business activity and led to cancelation of street festivals.

== Background ==
=== Prolonged local unrest ===
The Minneapolis–Saint Paul metropolitan area experienced a prolonged period of protests and unrest in 2020 and 2021 over issues of police brutality and racial injustice that began with the murder of George Floyd by Minneapolis police officer Derek Chauvin on May 25, 2020. In April 2021, the region experienced unrest over the killing of Daunte Wright on April 11, 2021, by a police officer in the Minneapolis suburb of Brooklyn Center, and protest rallies occurred during the criminal trial and coincided with the conviction of Chauvin on April 20, 2021.

The June 2021 events in Uptown Minneapolis occurred three miles from the 38th Street and Chicago Avenue intersection where Floyd was murdered. Activists had referred to the location as George Floyd Square and converted the street intersection into a memorial site and occupied protest. Early in the morning on June 3, 2021, city workers in Minneapolis removed barricades and attempted to reopen the intersection to vehicular traffic, but faced opposition from the protesters.

=== Killing of Winston Boogie Smith ===
Winston Boogie Smith Jr. was a 32-year-old black American man who resided in Saint Paul, Minnesota. On June 3, 2021, a law enforcement task force that apprehends wanted fugitives shot and killed Smith during an attempted arrest at 2:08 p.m. CDT at a parking ramp near the intersection of West Lake Street and Girard Avenue in the Uptown neighborhood of Minneapolis. An investigation of law enforcement conduct by the Minnesota Bureau of Criminal Apprehension in the days afterward said Smith had brandished a firearm and shot at officers who attempted to arrest him. Smith was killed by the several rounds fired by law enforcement officers. Law enforcement did not use body cameras or dashcams when apprehending Smith, and there was no known video evidence of the June 3 encounter. After an investigation by state and local officials, a report they released on October 11, 2021, said that the officers’ actions were justified under Minnesota Statutes and that no criminal charges should be filed against them.

== Events ==
=== Initial unrest ===
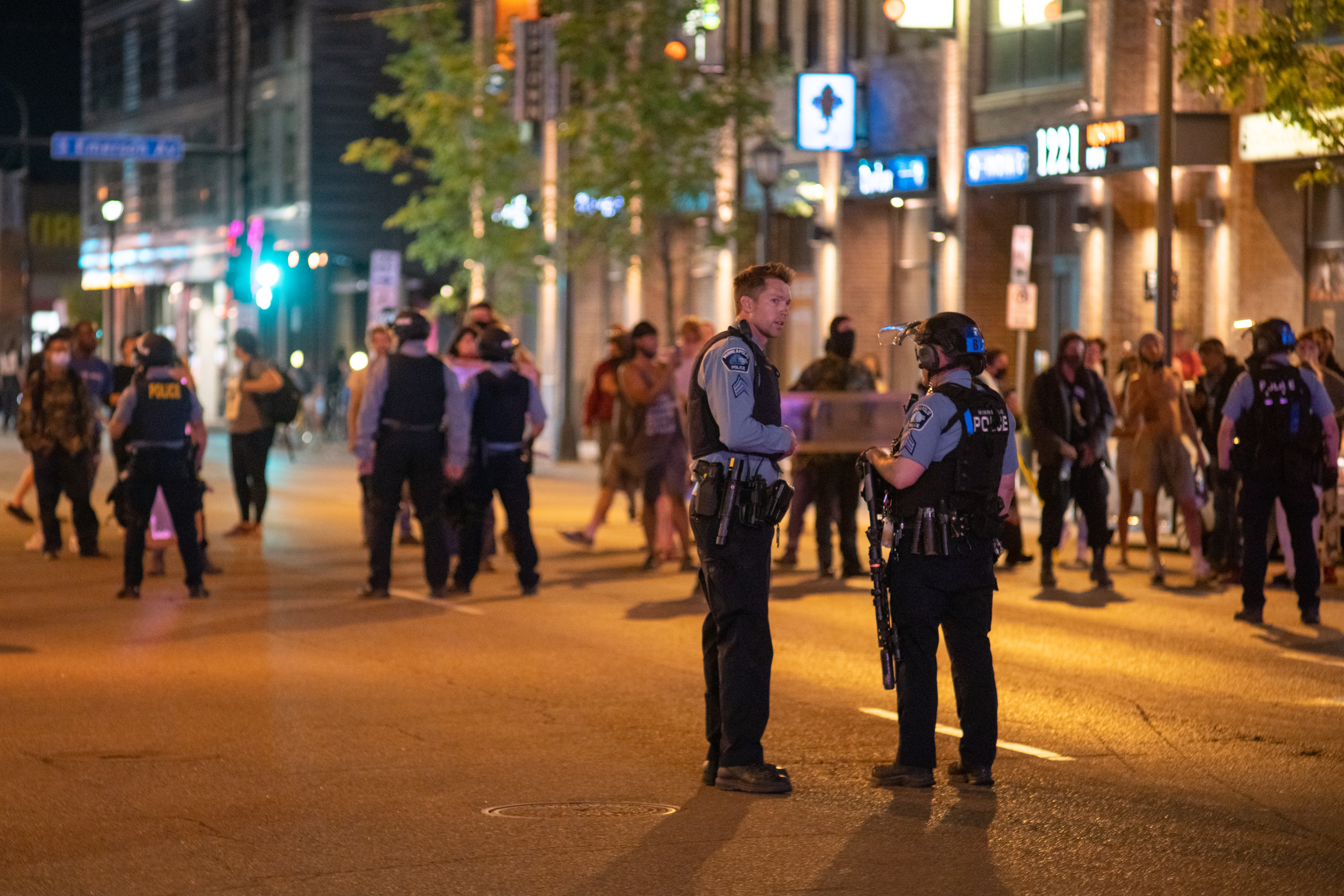
Minneapolis police on West Lake Street, June 3, 2021

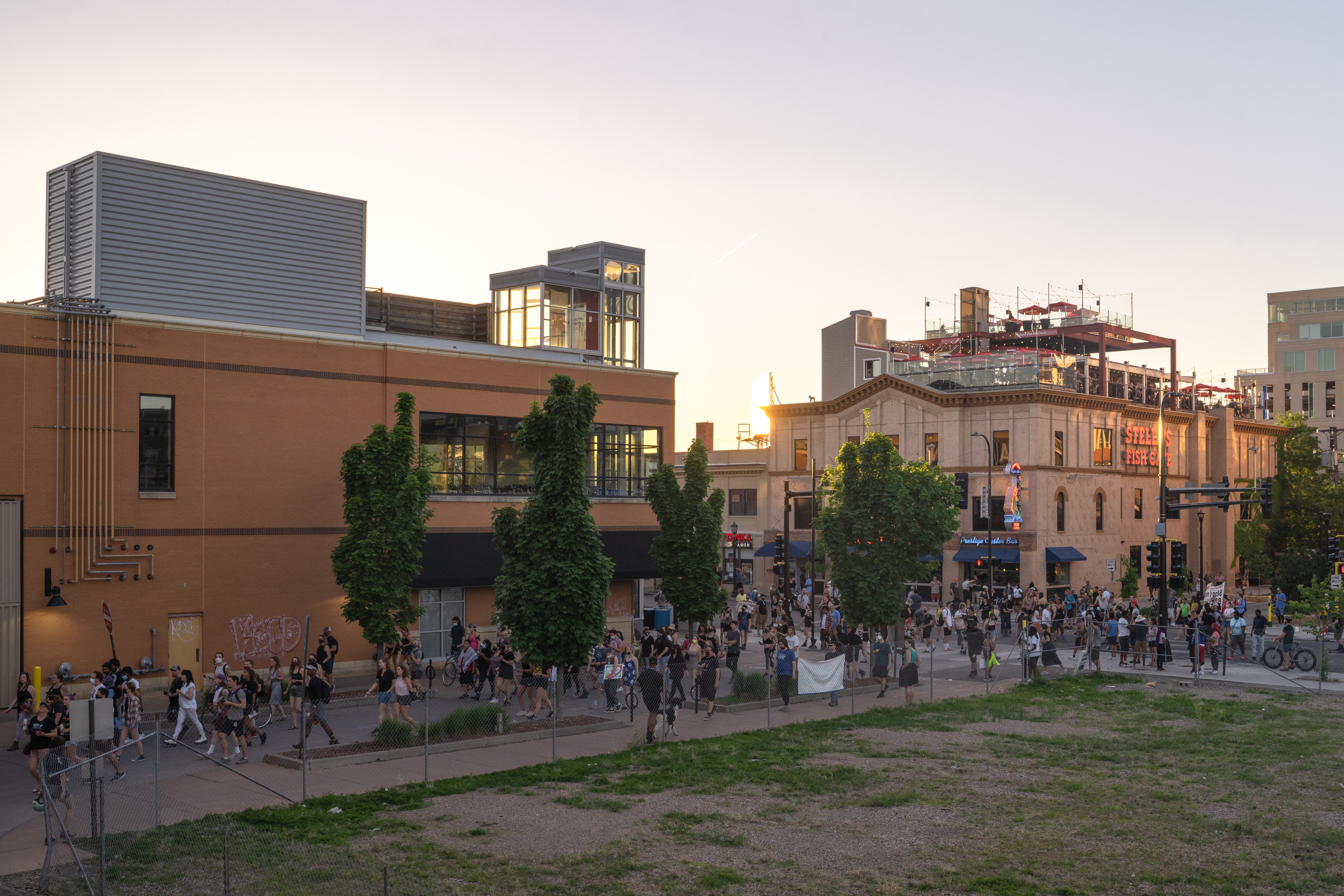
Protest march, June 4, 2021

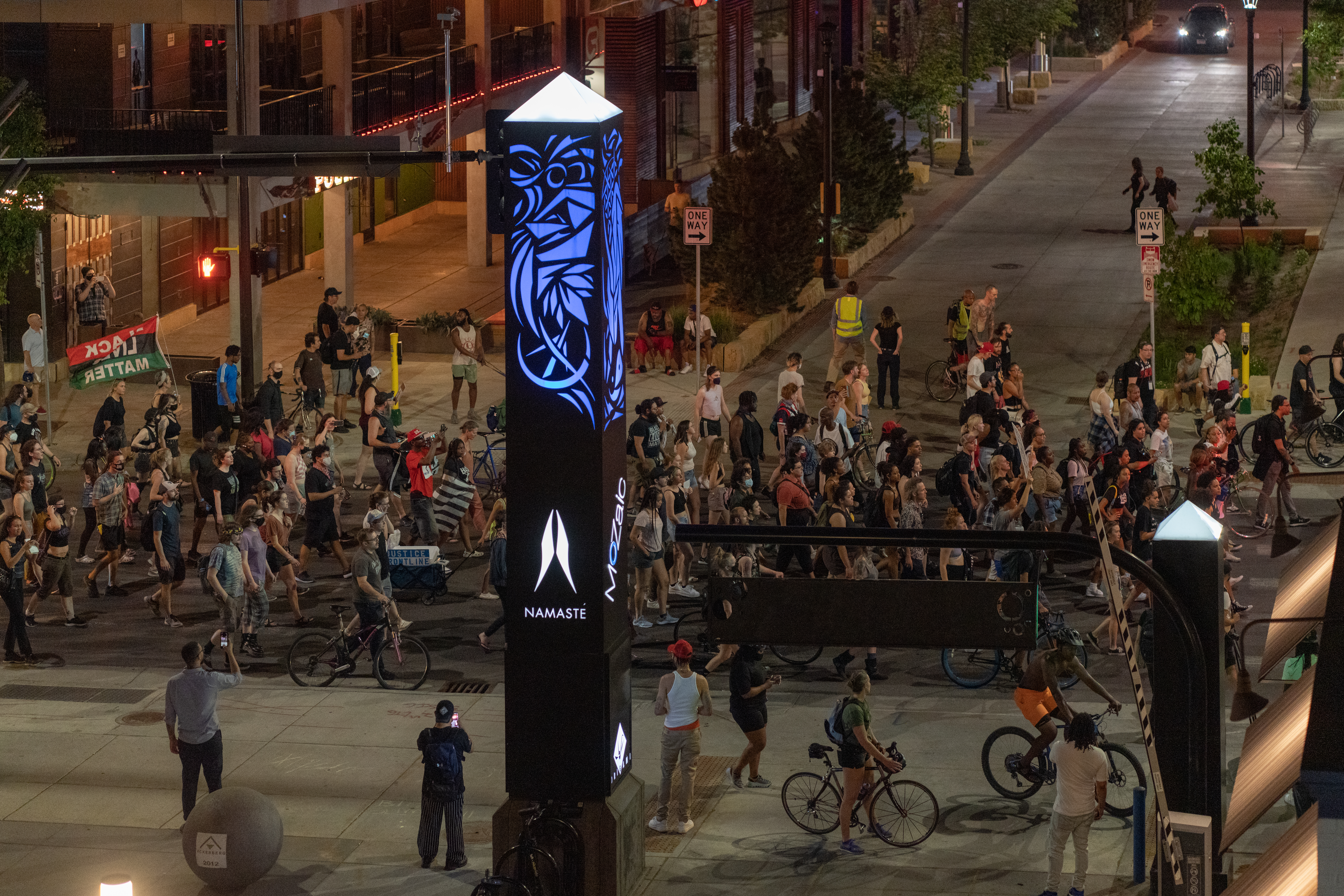
Protest march, June 5, 2021

The afternoon of Thursday, June 3, 2021, news spread quickly in Minneapolis that law enforcement officers had shot and killed a person during an attempted arrest at a parking ramp near West Lake Street and Girard Avenue in the Uptown neighborhood. A small crowd gathered at the scene and stood along police tape and some began chanting anti-police slogans at Minneapolis Police Department officers present at the location. Few details were known about the incident at the time; the race of the person shot and the involved officers had not been mentioned in official statements and local media coverage. Several community organizers worked to keep the gathering peaceful by deescalating tensions in the crowd. Most of the initial crowd dispersed by the early evening.

At nightfall, demonstrators blocked West Lake Street to vehicular traffic with a dumpster that they lit on fire. Overnight, dozens of buildings were damaged and several fires were started in the area. The Minneapolis Police Department gave permission for its officers responding to the unrest to use tear gas and rubber bullets if needed. Instead, patrols of police officers in riot gear fired flashbangs and used other crowd disperse methods. Authorities made nine arrests into overnight hours into June 4 for rioting, assault, obstruction, damage to property, and weapons procession. Several buildings in Uptown were broken into and vandalized. A spate of looting occurred to some businesses in the area, but the looting was not as widespread in Minneapolis as it was in late May 2020.

The identity of the person who was killed by law enforcement—Winston Boogie Smith, 32-year-old Black man from Minneapolis—was confirmed by his family and friends on Friday, June 4. Many businesses in the Uptown area, which had economic activity interrupted by the COVID-19 pandemic and other riots during the prior year, spent the day of June 4 cleaning up property damage and boarding up storefronts in preparation for further unrest. At the parking ramp where Smith was killed, it was tagged with anti-police graffiti. During the afternoon, protesters briefly blocked the intersection of Hennepin Avenue and West Lake Street. Minneapolis police later reopened the intersection by removing objects that had been placed as barricades, and slashing the tires of and towing vehicles that blocked the street.

Mayor Frey announced a public safety plan on June 4 to mobilize 100 law enforcement officers from the Hennepin County Sherriff's Office and the Minnesota State Patrol to respond to the unrest in Uptown. He said he spoke with Minnesota Governor Tim Walz about the Minnesota National Guard, but did not request their presence at that time.

Family and friends of Smith held a vigil the evening of June 4 at the parking ramp where he was killed. Demonstrators also returned to West Lake Street near Girard Avenue. At approximately 12:30 a.m. CDT on June 5, two dumpsters were set on fire. Police also reported that trees and other items were set fire and that some property was vandalized. No looting was reported overnight. Minneapolis police made 27 arrests in connection to the overnight demonstrations. Three other fatal shootings, unrelated to the Winston Smith protests earlier, occurred in the early morning hours of June 5 in Minneapolis, including of a bystander at a street race on East Lake Street. A Minneapolis police spokesperson said the department would amass additional law enforcement support from the Minnesota State Patrol and Hennepin County Sheriff's Office to respond to the unrest and illicit street racing in the city.

After two consecutive nights of arrests, demonstrations were mostly peaceful on Saturday, June 5. Protesters sought greater law enforcement transparency of the events that led to Smith's death. Demonstrators blocked streets in the Uptown neighborhood near where Smith was killed days prior and marched a short distance. Demonstrators also spray painted anti-police graffiti.

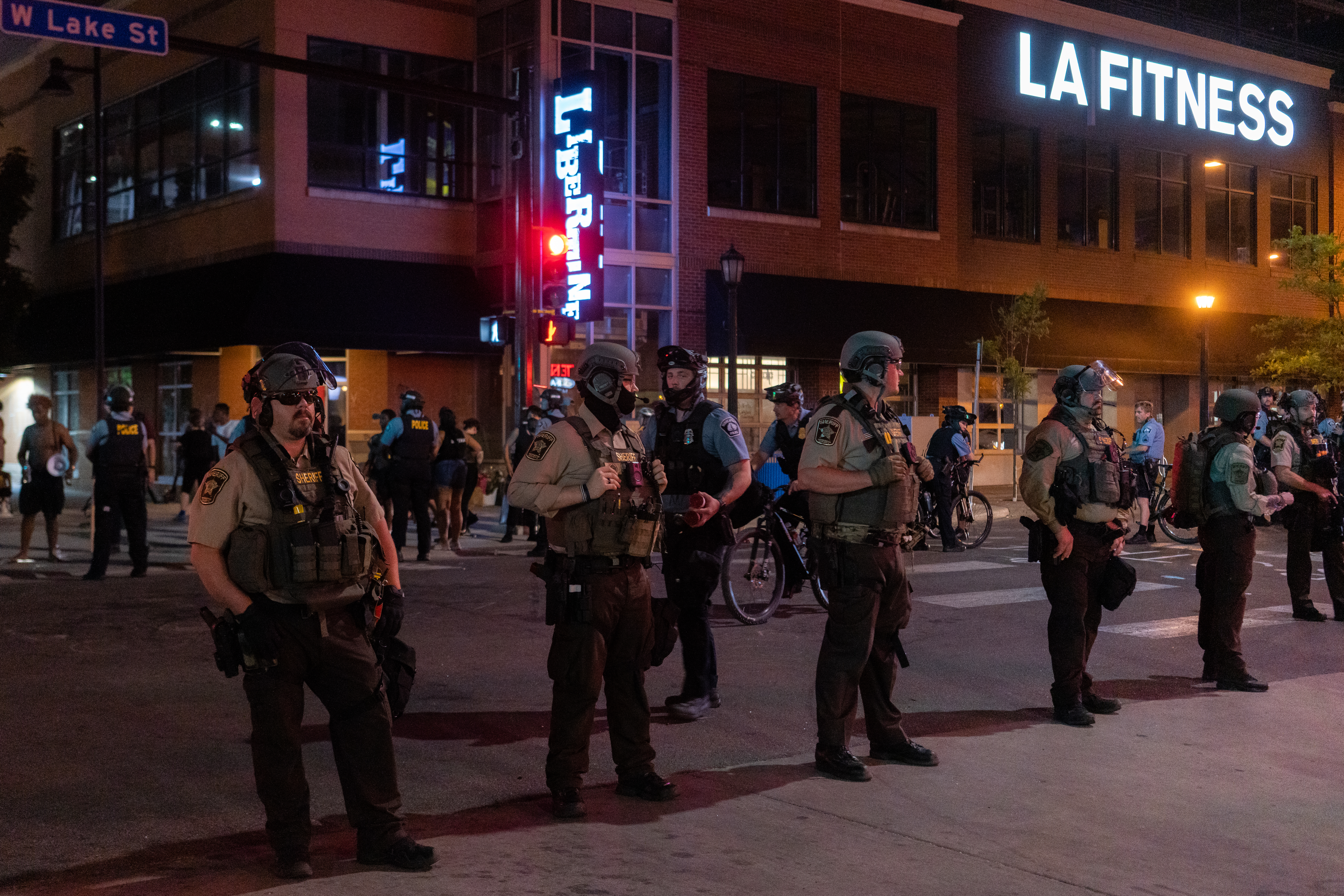
Officers from the Hennepin County Sherriff's Office and Minneapolis Police Department patrol West Lake Street, June 6, 2021

On Sunday, June 6, unrest persisted for a fourth night as protesters gathered for a rally at West Lake Street and Girard Avenue, and then marched down West Lake Street. Minneapolis police officers ushered the marchers to the sidewalk, and after a brief standoff, the group marched on smaller, adjacent roadways. The size of the protest group was as many as 100 people.

Protests were held nearly daily through June 9.

On June 10, attorneys for the passenger that was in Smith's car during the June 3 incident said that she had never seen a firearm on Smith or in the vehicle, and civil rights activists called for greater law enforcement transparency. At West Lake Street and Girard Avenue, protesters painted portions of the street red, and they left graffiti messages near the parking ramp where Smith was killed.

Protests featured a rally on June 13 at the top level of the parking ramp where Smith was killed.

=== Vehicle-ramming attack ===
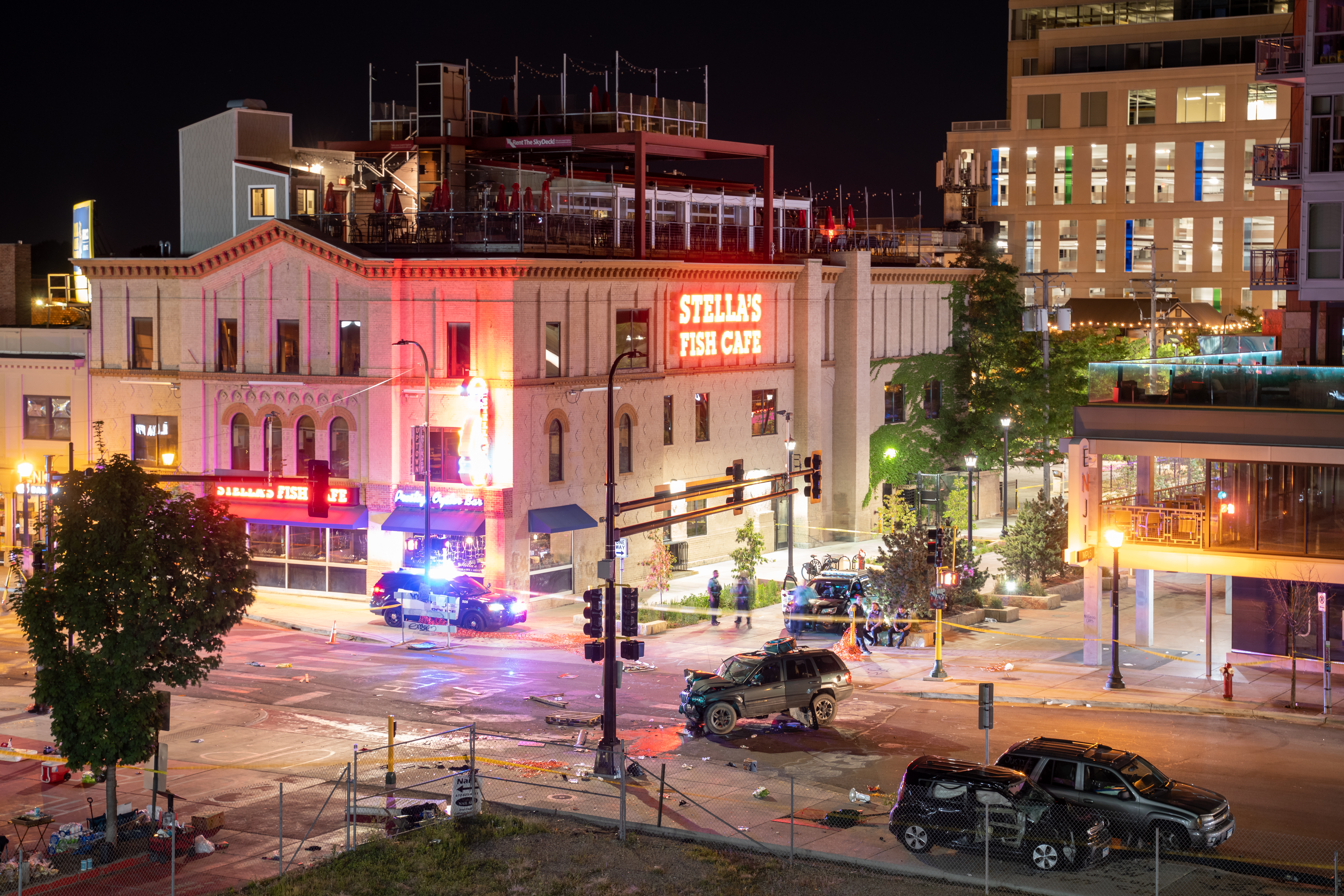
The secured crime scene of the June 13 vehicle-ramming attack, pictured on June 14, 2021

The evening of Sunday, June 13 demonstrators blocked the intersection of West Lake Street and Girard Avenue for an event, with some playing volleyball and lawn games. At approximately 11:39 p.m. CDT, a man in a Jeep Cherokee drove into the crowd at a high speed, striking a parked vehicle that had been used to block off the intersection to traffic, which then collided with protesters. One protester was killed, and three others suffered injuries that were not life-threatening. Family of the deceased identified her as Deona Knajdek (some reports also identified her as Deona Erickson or Deona Marie), a 31-year-old woman from Minneapolis. According to her family, the car that was struck belonged to Knajdek, and she had parked it there as a blockade to protect protesters. Demonstrators detained the driver until police arrived at the scene.

The driver, identified as Nicholas Kraus, a 35-year-old man from Saint Paul, Minnesota, was arrested and charged with second-degree murder and assault with a dangerous weapon. The man allegedly admitted to authorities that he intentionally driven at a high speed in an attempt to go over the barricades. Three hours before the vehicle attack, a demonstrator had climbed a pole and spray painted a surveillance camera located at the intersection of West Lake Street and Girard Avenue. Officials believed the camera would have captured "crucial evidence" about crash, and law enforcement sought the public's assistance to identify a suspect who painted over the camera.

=== Continued unrest ===
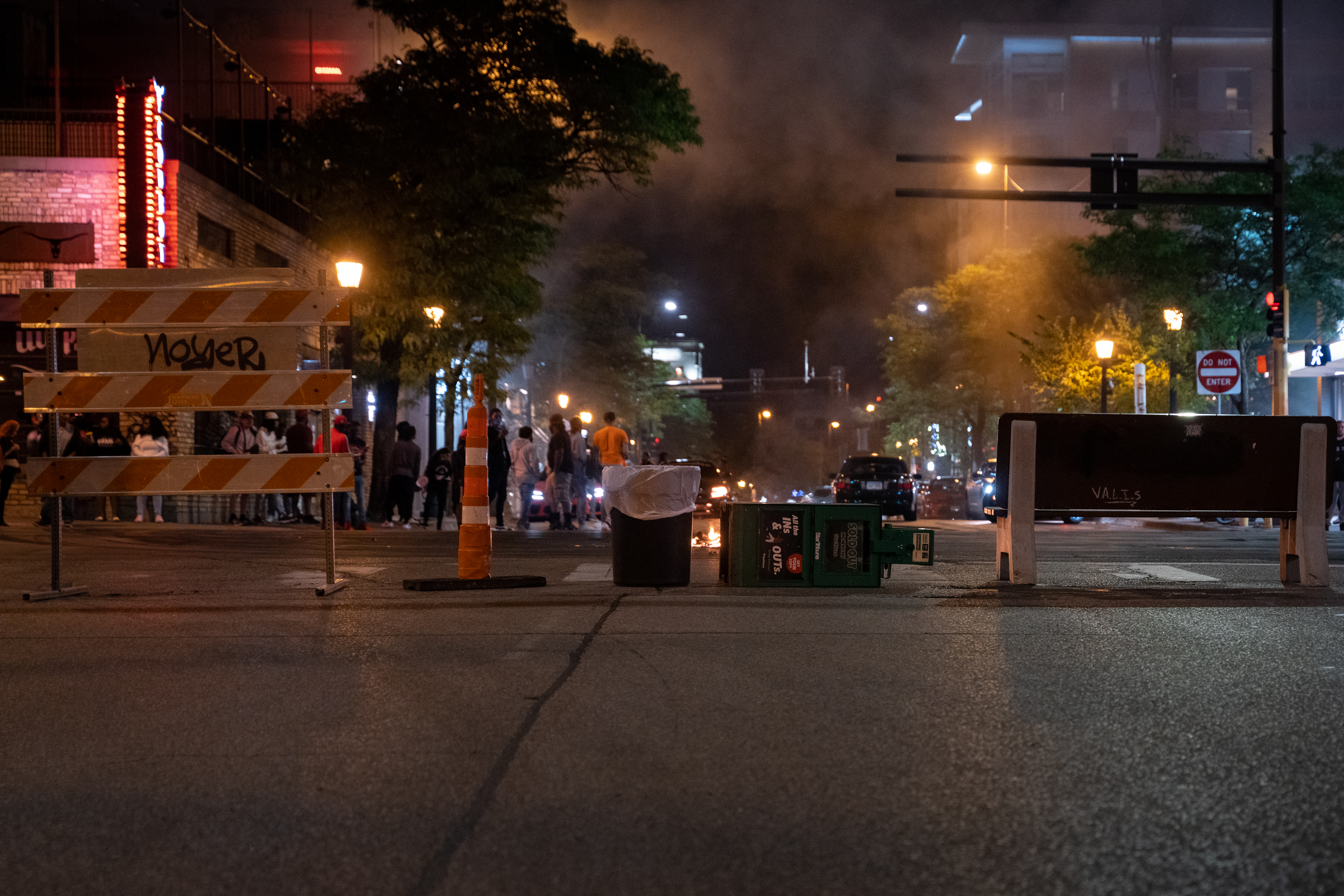
Street demonstration just after midnight on July 8, 2021

During the early morning hours of June 14, a small group continued to block the West Lake Street and Girard Avenue intersection with some yelling at drivers in other vehicles. A person fired gunshots after a confrontation with the driver of a vehicle. Minneapolis police made two arrests. Protests were held in Uptown during the day on June 14 with demonstrators calling for justice for Smith and Knajdek. Protesters blocked vehicular traffic on West Lake Street at Hennepin Avenue. Hundreds of people gathered for a vigil for Knajdek that night. On June 15, demonstrators intermittently held portions of West Lake Street during the afternoon and evening on June 15. Law enforcement officers from the Minneapolis police and Hennepin County sheriff's office that wore riot gear advanced to push protesters off West Lake Street while city crews removed makeshift barricades that included trash cans, a bus shelter, and other objects. The night of June 15, police detained several demonstrators, resulting in 27 citations and three arrests.

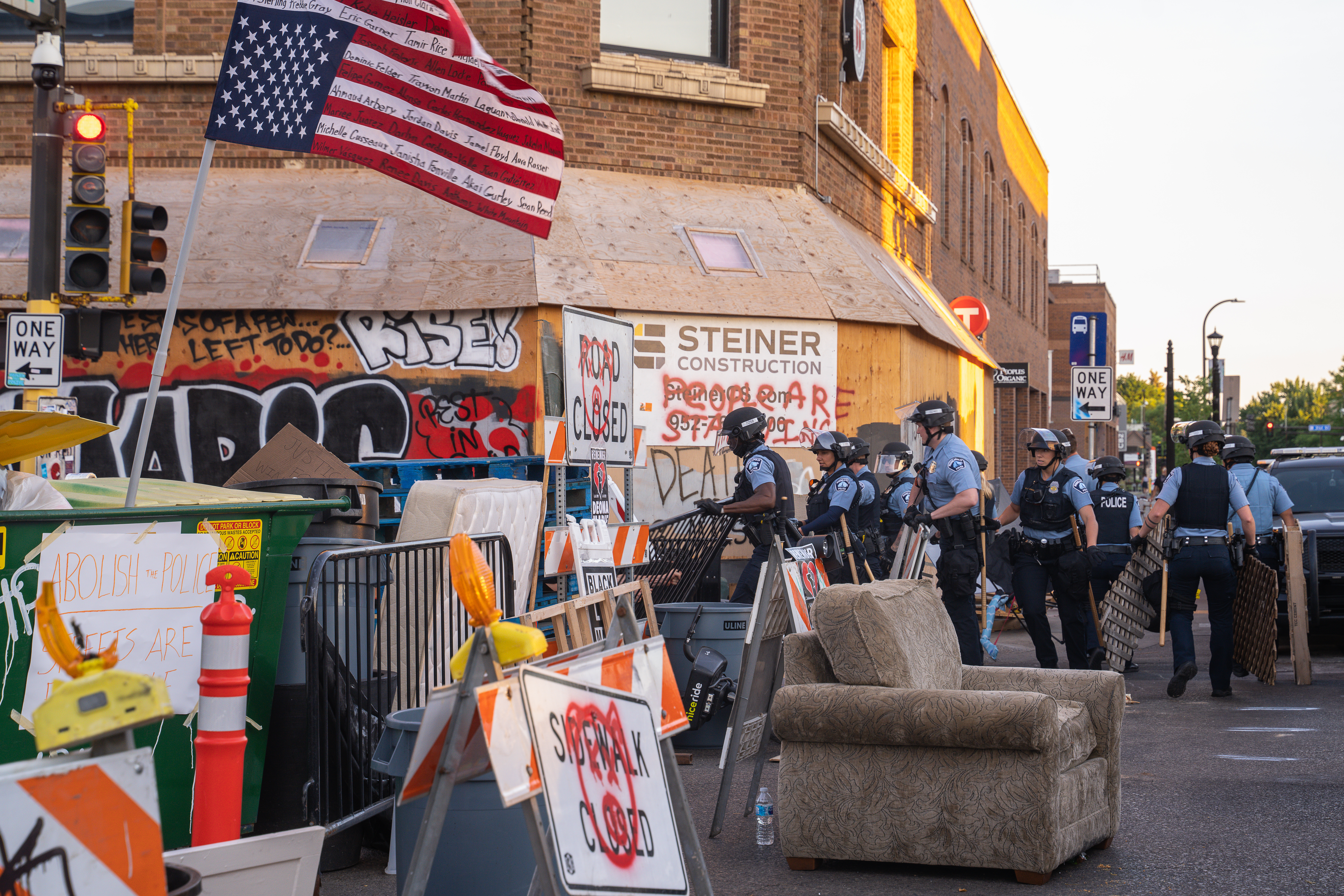
Police remove makeshift barricades on June 15, 2021

On June 16, the Minnesota National Guard announced that 100 troops were being activated for potential deployment to support the city's response to civil unrest. The back-and-forth exchange of protesters attempting a street occupation by erecting barricades and police removing them continued throughout the day. Demonstrators asserted that the protests were about issues beyond just the killings of Smith and Knajdek. People also gathered for a memorial to Knajdek on what would have been her 32nd birthday. Protesters demanded that Kraus, the man accused of killing Knajdek who was charged with second-degree murder, face the more serious first-degree murder charge and that the officers who shot and killed Smith also face criminal charges.

On June 17 at 1:30 a.m. CDT, police removed makeshift barriers that were used by demonstrators to "hold the space" near were Smith and Knajdek were killed, reopening West Lake Street to vehicular traffic.

Dozens of people gathered at West Lake Street and Girard Avenue on June 24. During the overnight hours, Minneapolis police officers disbursed the crowd after the streetway was blocked with makeshift barricades and several dumpsters were lit on fire. Minneapolis police made four arrests. Authorities later charged Demonte Jamond Walkins, a 22-year old Minneapolis resident, for allegedly brandishing and discharging a firearm during the street occupation the night of June 24. Walkins pled guilty in a Hennepin County court on December 10, 2021, to the charge of reckless discharge of a firearm.

A group of activists on June 27 blocked the vehicle of Minneapolis Council Member Andrea Jenkins after a Pride event near Loring Park for over an hour and did not let her leave until she signed a list of their demands that included dropping charges against those who were arrested at protests of Winston Smith's death.

Between July 3 and July 6, several fires, burglaries, and property damage were reported in the West Lake Street area near the location of prior unrest. During the overnight hours of July 6, demonstrators blocked the intersection of Lagoon and Girard avenues, and law enforcement and fire authorities responded to street racing, dumpster fires, a fire at Stella's Fish Café, and entry of intruders to a business. Authorities later charged Tyler Ferguson, a 22-year-old man from Minneapolis, for second-degree arson and first-degree damage to property. Ferguson had allegedly pushed dumpsters into the street on July 3 and helped another person fuel a fire next to Stella's Fish Café on July 6 causing about $80,000 in damages. He pled guilty on January 4, 2022, to the lesser charge of damage to property. Ferguson was credited for 66 days served in jail and ordered to pay a $1,000 fine.

A small group of demonstrators gathered near the West Lake Street and Girard Avenue intersection at night on July 7 and lit several small fires in trash cans. By 10 p.m., several calls to 9-1-1 reported that there were vehicles engaged in street racing and that bystanders had visible firearms. Those calling 9-1-1 also said that rocks were being thrown at them. A video filmed by independent media captured a vehicle conducting doughnut-style maneuvers while a passenger in the vehicle fired more than 30 gunshots into the air from a 9mm handgun as a crowd of bystanders scrambled for cover. Minneapolis police responded to the scene and issued a dispersal order for the crowd that had gathered there. The next day, Minneapolis police arrested the person it believed had fired the gunshots and the arrest warrant alleged the person was part of a known group of illicit street racers in the city. Some demonstrators expressed support for the car spinouts and shots fired in the air as a form of protest.

=== Protest gardens and removal ===
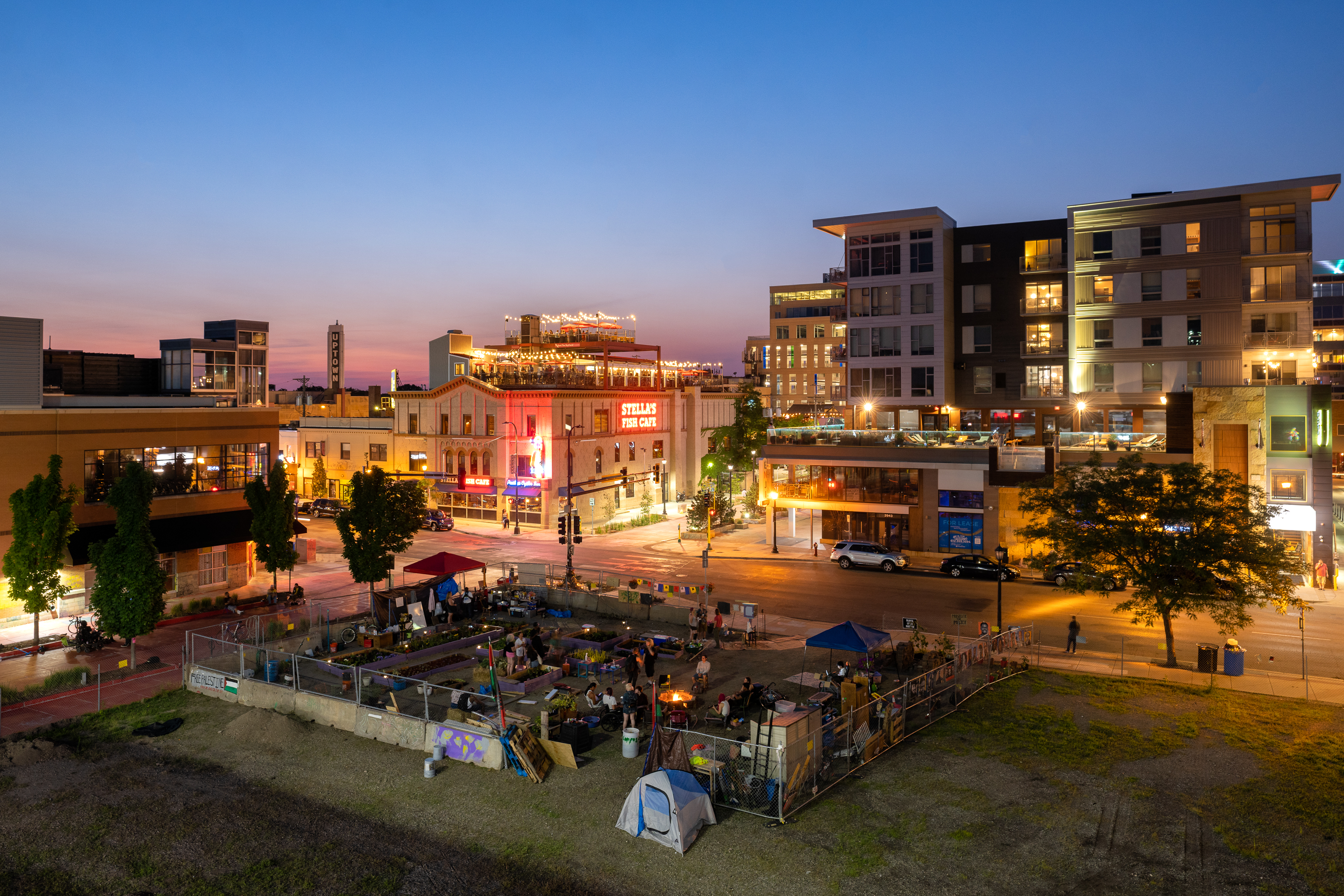
Protest garden and camp, July 2, 2021

Demonstrators installed guerrilla gardens on a vacant lot near where Smith and Knajdek were killed. Activists said the purpose of the gardens were to promote community solidarity and racial justice. Some people referred to it as the Wince-Marie Peace Garden. The garden area was the site of persistent protests since Smith's death.

The gardens were installed on private property owned by Seven Points, who initially allowed the community gardens on the condition that it was a peaceful gathering place, but had it removed on July 14 with the help of city officials after reports of violence and arson in the area. Bicycle mounted police officers guarded a skid-steer loader and other machinery that tore down garden structures.

Some area residents and business expressed support for removing the gardens, but worried the action might result in continued unrest. A group of 10 people protested the removal of the gardens the morning of July 14. That night, demonstrators returned to the area and blocked the street with makeshift barricades and Minneapolis police made arrests.

=== Other notable events ===
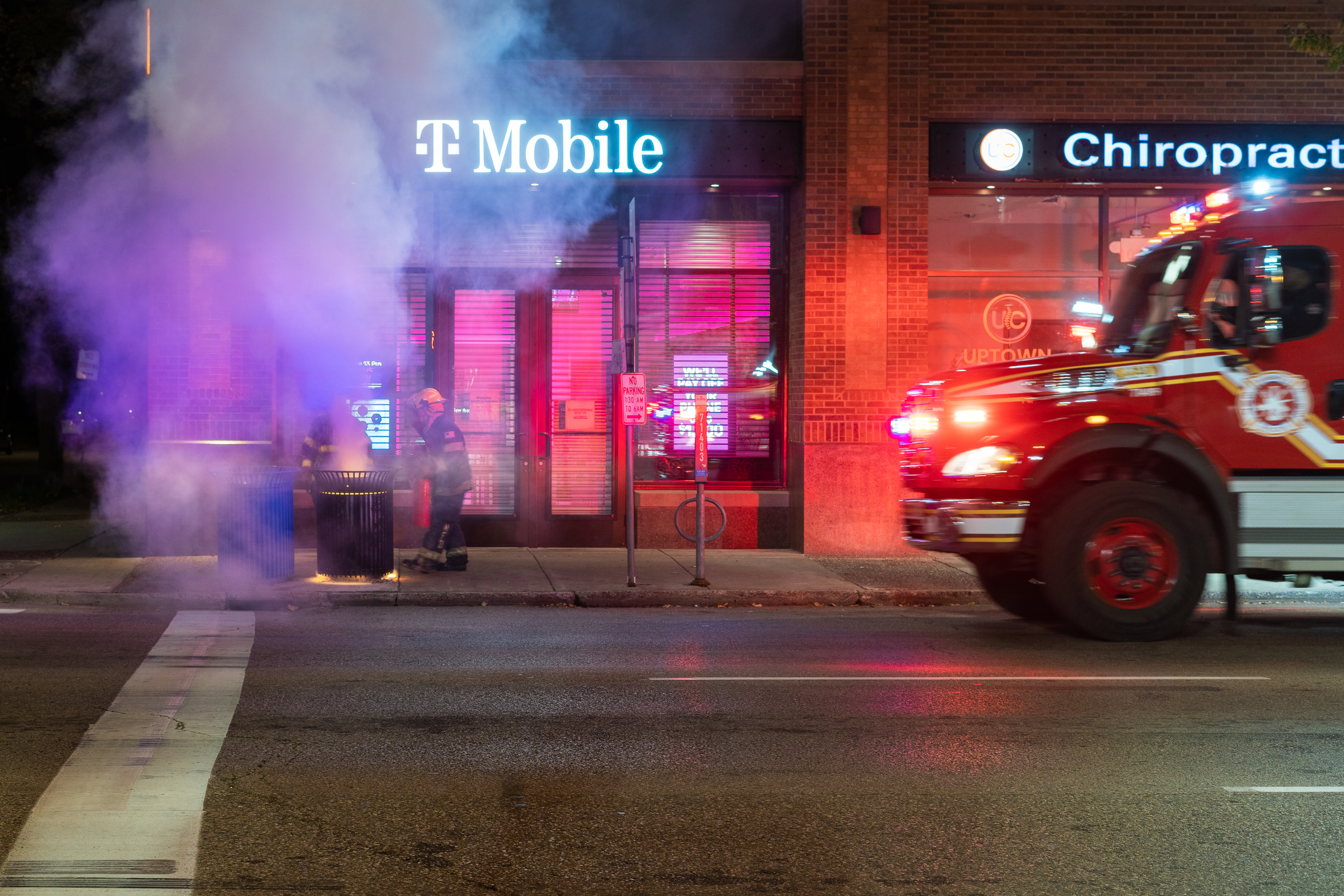
Trash can fire on West Lake Street, November 3, 2021

The night of June 7, several hot rod vehicles overtook East Lake Street, a few miles away, near the Hiawatha Avenue bridge to perform spin outs. Nicholas Enger, a 17-year-old from Cambridge, Minnesota, who was observing the vehicles, was shot and killed by gang-related gunfire.

On July 8, after several weeks of unrest and reports of violent crime, illicit street racing, and gunshots in the Uptown area, Mayor Frey announced law enforcement partnerships to mobilize resources from neighboring jurisdictions and from federal agencies such as the FBI and ATF.

On July 15, Minneapolis police officers arrested a 26-year-old man from Woodbury, Minnesota, who was initially detained by private security guards for trespassing after a confrontation with security personnel. Mayor Frey announced plans to amass law enforcement resources from several local jurisdictions and federal agencies in Minneapolis.

On July 16, Governor Walz activated 100 troops from the Minnesota National Guard for possible deployment to Minneapolis after receiving a request for assistance from Frey to help quell unrest. It was the city's fifth request for National Guard assistance since the murder of George Floyd in May 2020. The troops were placed on standby and no operation orders were issued to send troops into Minneapolis. About 30 protesters gathered to block the intersection of 31st Street and Girard Avenue that night, and Minneapolis police made several arrests to clear the street intersection.

On August 13, a crowd of approximately 20 activists gathered on Lake Street to mark the two-month anniversary of Knajdek's death.

On October 11, following the decision by officials not to file criminal charges against the officers who shot Smith, his family gathered near the boarded-up memorial site to call for an independent investigation of the June 3 incident.

On November 3, a small group of demonstrators lit a trash can on fire.

== Themes and controversies ==
=== Misinformation ===
Initial reports by police scanners on June 3 and a report by the Star Tribune newspaper said law enforcement had shot and killed a "murder suspect", a detail that was later proved false and that the newspaper retracted. The false "murder suspect" claim was compared to initial reports by the Minneapolis Police Department in May 2020 that George Floyd, an African-American man died "after a medical incident" during an arrest, which made no mention that police officer Derek Chauvin had knelt on his neck for several minutes as he lost consciousness and died. The false characterization of Smith as a murder suspect led to further public distrust of official information in the days after Smith's death.

=== Street occupation ===
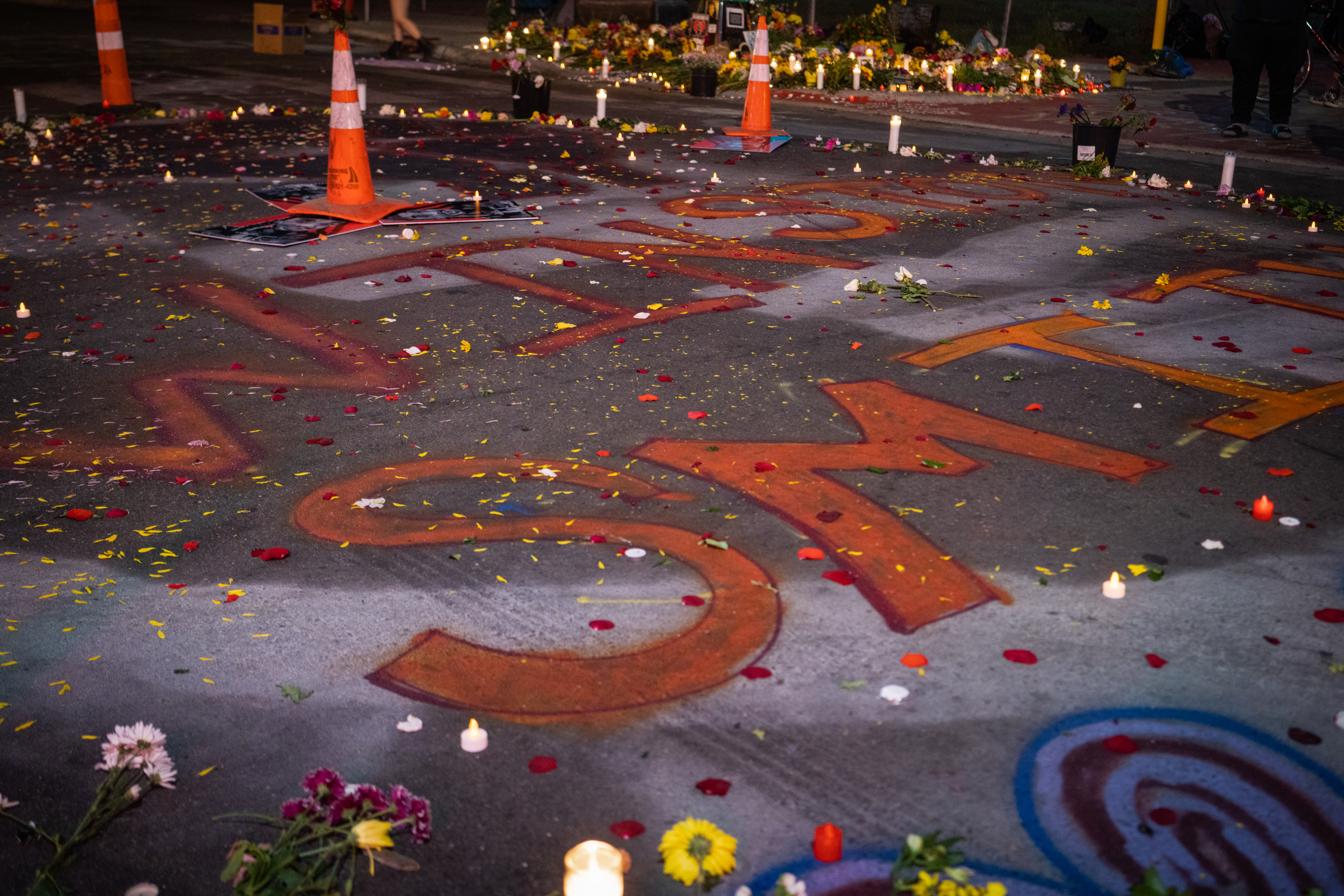
Memorials on West Lake Street, June 14, 2021

Demonstrators made several attempts to hold space for Winston Smith and Deona Knajdek during the course of events by blocking the area of West Lake Street and Girard Avenue, a busy intersection, to vehicular traffic. Some demonstrators said to media reporters they were attempting an occupied protest or "no-go" zone similar to George Floyd Square at the intersection of 38th and Chicago, a protester-held area in the city's Powderhorn Park community that had been a gathering place for social justice protests and was adorned with public art and memorials.

On West Lake Street in Uptown over several days in June, demonstrators blocked the street intersection with makeshift barricades such as vehicles, motorcycles, road construction signs, and other objects. Chants of “'Whose streets? Our streets!” were reported and portions of the street surface were painted red by demonstrators. Knajdek, a social justice protester, was killed during a street occupation the night of June 13.

Minneapolis police officers and city officials crews periodically removed barricades to reopen the street to vehicle traffic. The city declared the attempted street occupation a public safety issue. At a press conference on June 15, 2021, several Minneapolis officials commented on the tension between police and demonstrator on West Lake Street. Minneapolis mayor Jacob Frey said the city would not allow unauthorized street closures. Minneapolis City Counselor Lisa Bender said she recognized that the protests were attempting to gain broader understanding of Winston Smith's death. The city and police said it would make arrests if people did not vacate the street after law enforcement dispersal orders.

=== Private security ===
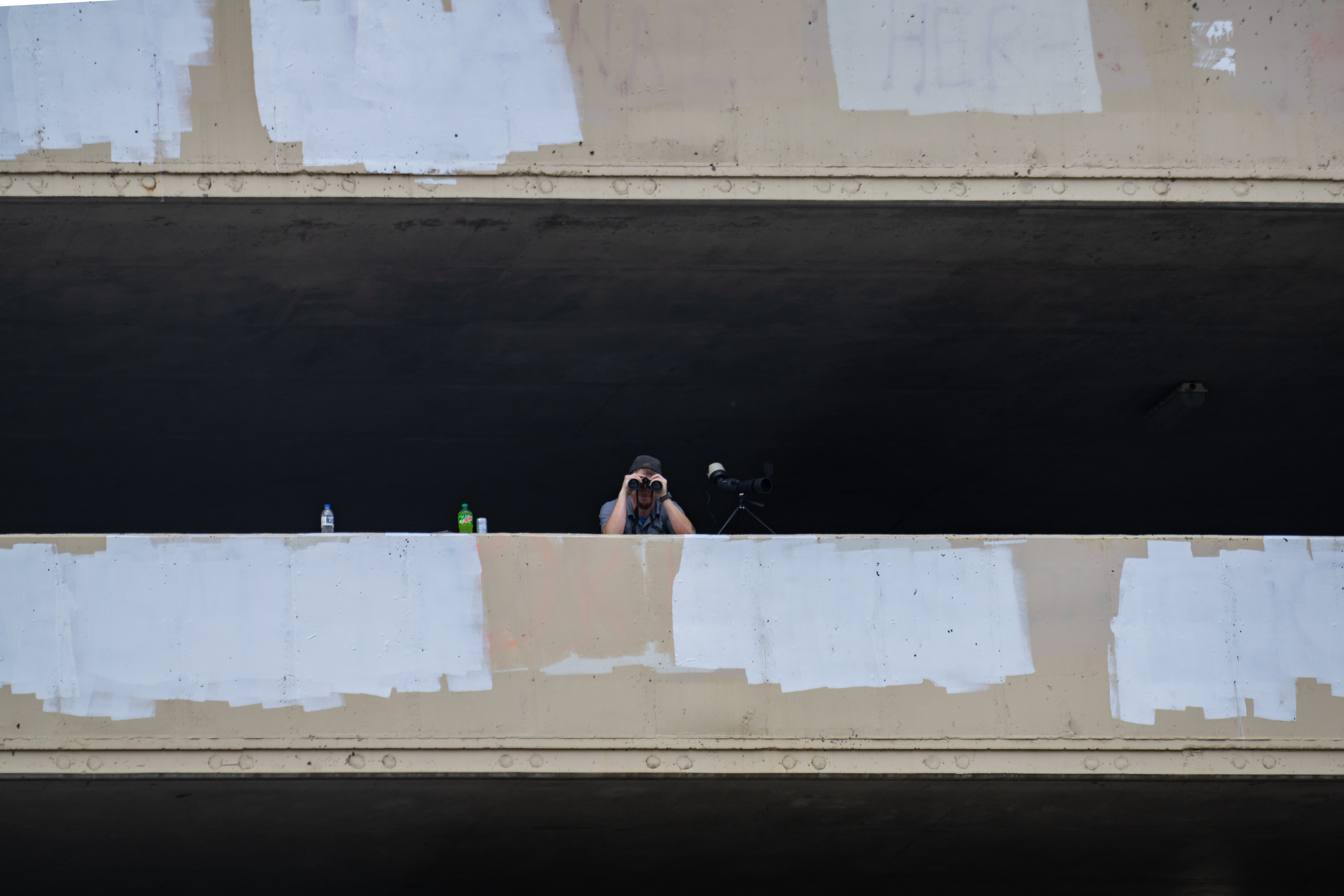
Private security guards at the parking ramp, July 17, 2021

In response to the frequent fires and violence in the area, owners of the Seven Points shopping mall hired private security contractors to patrol the parking ramp, vacant lot, and other areas of recent demonstrations. Some activists objected and characterized security as resembling paramilitary forces and accused them of acting aggressively toward protesters.

=== Local economic impact ===
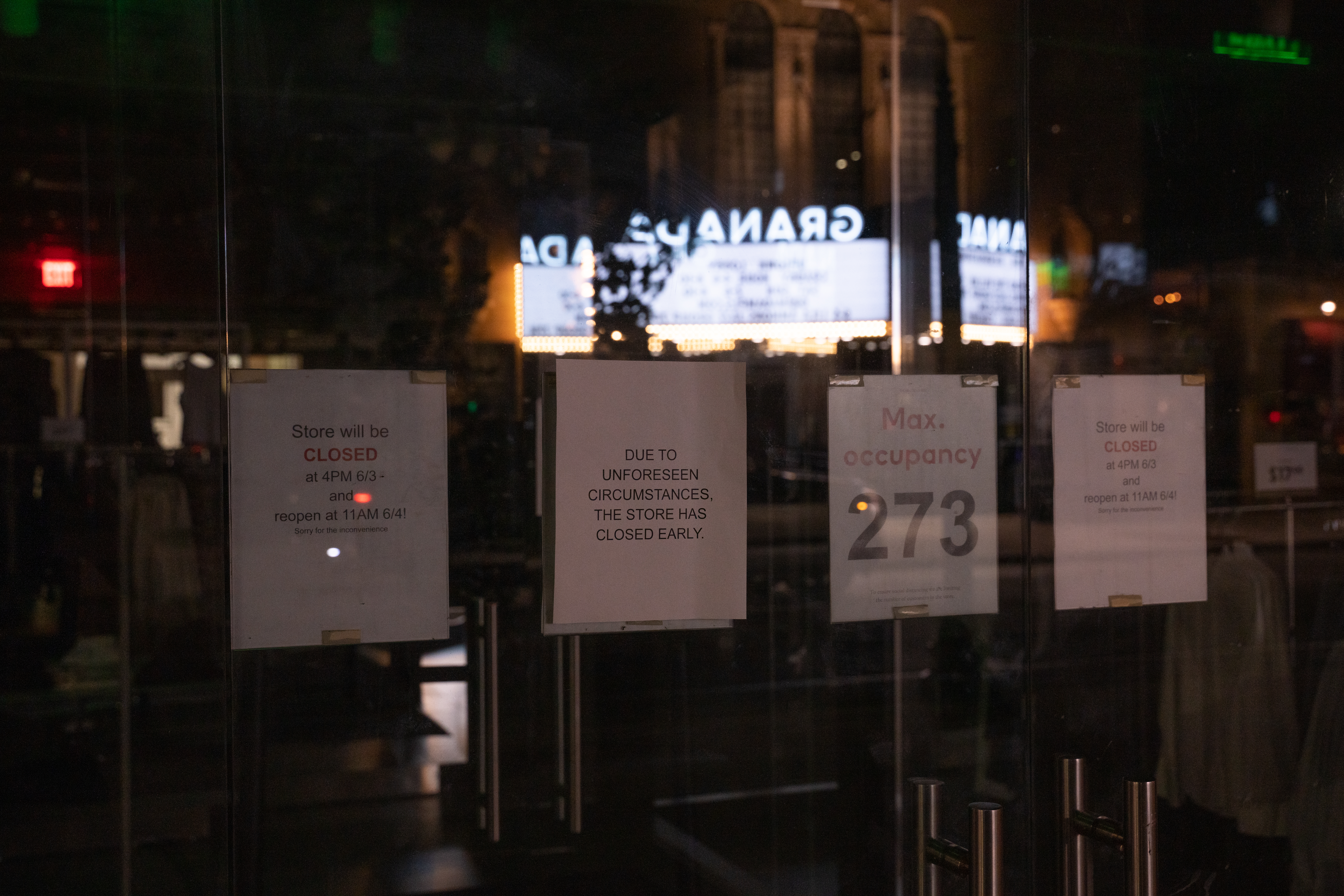
Closure notices on a H&M clothing store, June 4, 2021

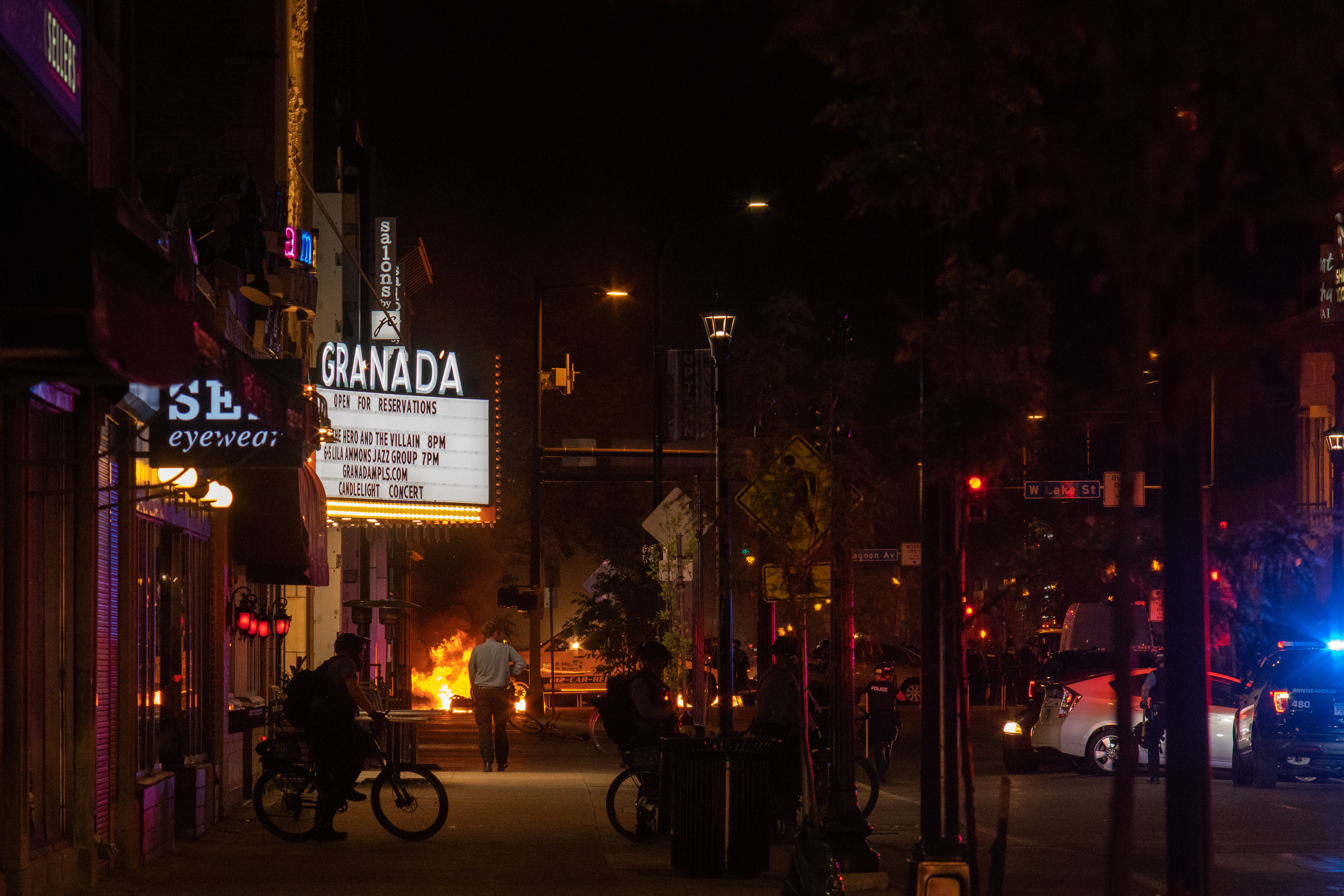
Fire near the Granada Theater in Uptown, June 4, 2021

The peaceful protests and destructive unrest had an impact on the three-block stretch of West Lake Street in Minneapolis near were Smith and Knajdek were killed. Prior to the 2021 unrest, the Uptown economy faced hardships from several business closures, the COVID-19 pandemic, and the George Floyd protests in Minneapolis–Saint Paul. Over several days of rioting after Floyd's murder in May 2020, 334 business were damaged a long a six-stretch block of Lake Street, and by a year later 110 of the businesses remained closed. In early June 2021, the historic Uptown Theatre had closed. The Twin Cities Business Magazine remarked on June 15, 2021, that "Uptown businesses are on rocky ground" following the accumulated impacts of events and unrest.

During the overnight hours of June 3, 2021, several buildings were broken into, but there was no widespread looting. One man was charged with trying to start fires in an Upton alley. Many businesses boarded up windows and others closed temporarily to prevent further damage. Jill Osiecki, director of the non-profit Uptown Association that promoted local businesses, expressed frustration with the cycle of unrest that she perceived to be unending.

Several business walls and sidewalks were painted with graffiti that workers removed and business were left paying for the clean up. Some demonstrators left threatening graffiti messages on buildings, such as "Kill cops". Several businesses reported less foot traffic in stores and some retail locations remained closed during the June 2021 unrest, such as the Seven Points shopping center. Business partnerships sought ways to revitalize and promote economic resiliency during the unrest. Uptown residents organized graffiti removal and trash pickup the mornings after unrest and others formed social media groups that tracked local vandalism and crimes to obtain attention of Minneapolis city councilors. In mid June, the owner of the Juut Salonspa beauty salon that had been in the area since 1986 announced the permanent closure of their store due to unrest, crime, and street closures that affected business activity. In October, retailer John Fluevog Shoes permanently closed its store location on Hennepin Avenue and cited both the riots and COVID-19 pandemic as the reasons for its financial decision.

Some residents and business owners objected to the aggressive tactics of demonstrators over Smith's death and expressed frustration that the Uptown neighborhood had to deal with the effects of civil disorder. A resident perceived that peaceful protests gave way to a separate, late-night element of people engaging in criminal activity. Other residents felt the inconvenience of street and temporary business closures were necessary to achieve social change.

The Uptown Association cancelled its annual Uptown Art Fair that had been scheduled August 2021. The street festival had an estimated 300,000 attendees and it showcased over 300 artists. The Uptown Association cited several factors for cancelling the event, including recent demonstrations, fires, and illicit street racing. The art fair had run continuously for the past 57 years until 2020 when it was cancelled due to the COVID-19 pandemic. St. Mary's Greek Orthodox Church cancelled the September 2021 Greek festival it sponsored in annually in the Uptown neighborhood, citing the recent unrest and potential safety and security issues.

== Aftermath ==
=== Civil claims ===
In October 2022, the City of Minneapolis settled a $13,000 civil claim with a protester that was unlawful arrested while on a public sidewalk on June 5, 2021, during the unrest. In early 2023, another demonstrator filed a lawsuit against the city related to a traumatic brain injury suffered on June 4, 2021, as Minneapolis police officers were clearing the street. The lawsuit alleged that the demonstrator was being non-violent and following police orders when she was pushed to the ground by two officers. The United States Department of Justice cited the incident and others from the Uptown unrest as a pattern of the Minneapolis Police Department violating First Amendment rights and failing to distinguish between peaceful protesters and those breaking the law. In 2024, the City of Minneapolis settled a lawsuit for $800,000 with the Freedom Fighters—an unofficial militia that provided security during unrest. Eight members of the group were wrongfully arrested the night of June 4, 2021.

=== Kraus' guilty plea ===
Kraus was found mentally competent to stand trial for the June 13, 2021, killing of Deona Marie Knajdek with his vehicle. In order to avoid trial, Kraus pleaded guilty on October 24, 2022, the charges of unintentional murder for Knajdek's death and second-degree assault with a dangerous weapon for injuring another protester.

== See also ==
- 2020–2021 United States racial unrest
- List of incidents of civil unrest in Minneapolis–Saint Paul
