= Killing of Deona Marie Knajdek =

Vehicle-ramming attack in Minneapolis in June 2021

- Part of 2021 Uptown Minneapolis unrest
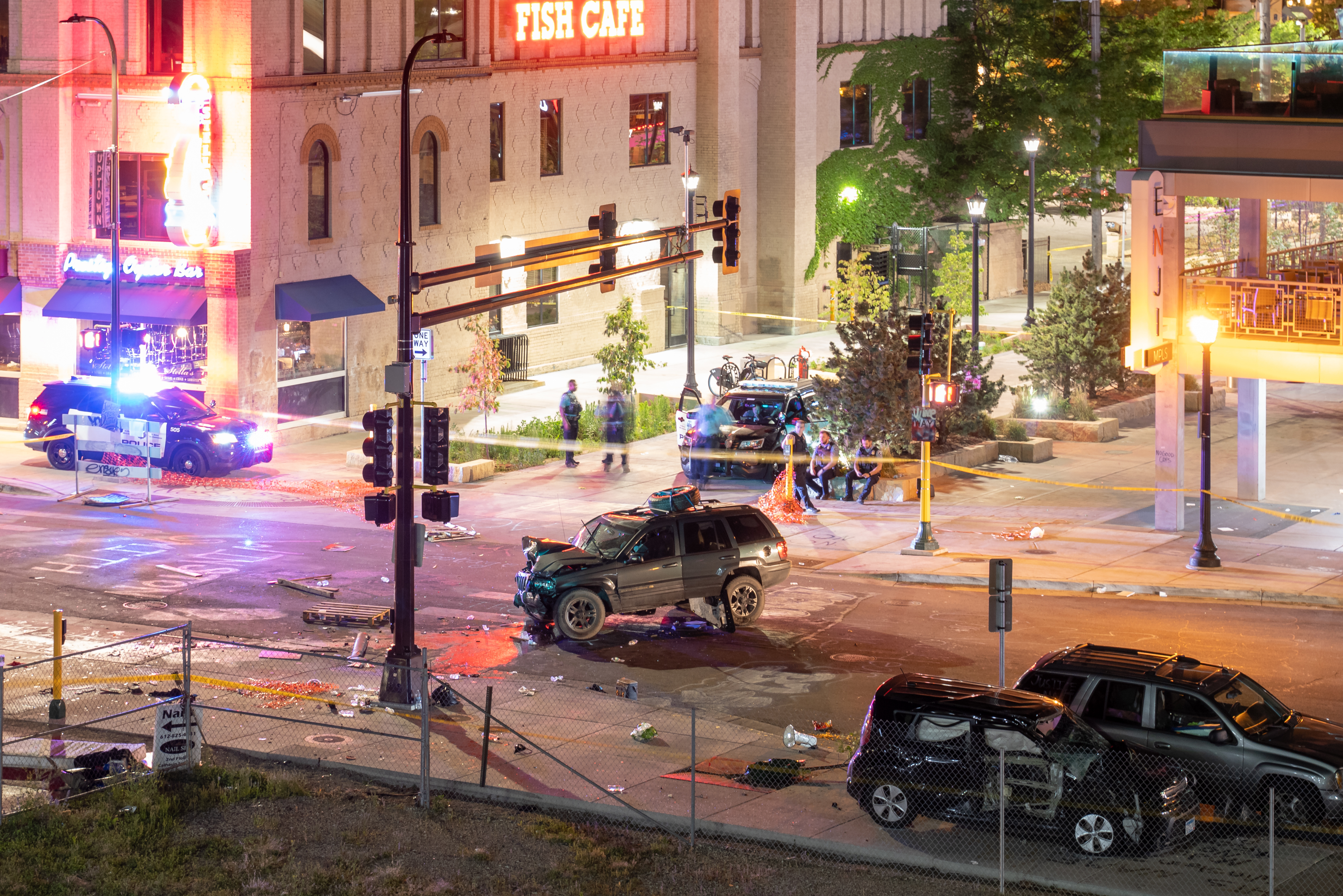
- The secured crime scene of the attack
- Location: 44°56′53.6701″N 93°17′51.3492″W; Minneapolis, Minnesota, United States
- Date: June 13, 2021; 11:39 p.m (CDT)
- Attack type: Vehicle-ramming attack
- Weapon: Jeep Grand Cherokee
- Deaths: 1
- Injuries: 4 (including the driver)
- Perpetrator: Nicholas Kraus (driver)
- Charges: Second-degree intentional murder; Second-degree assault with a deadly weapon
- Verdict: Pleaded guilty on October 24, 2022
- Convicted: Second-degree Unintentional murder; Second-degree assault with a deadly weapon
- State of Minnesota vs. Nicholas David Kraus

Deona Marie Knajdek (also reported as Deona Marie Erickson), a 31-year old American woman, was killed on June 13, 2021, when a man drove a car into a crowd of demonstrators who had gathered as a part of the Uptown Minneapolis unrest. That evening, demonstrators protesting the law enforcement killing of Winston Boogie Smith had blocked the intersection of West Lake Street and Girard Avenue. At approximately 11:39 p.m. CDT, a man in a Jeep Grand Cherokee drove into the crowd at a high speed, striking a parked vehicle that had been used to block off the intersection to traffic, which then collided with protesters, killing Knajdek and injuring three others.

The driver, Nicholas Kraus of Saint Paul, Minnesota, was charged with second-degree intentional murder and two counts of assault with a deadly weapon in relation to the crash, after allegedly telling investigators that he had accelerated towards the crowd in an attempt to clear cars acting as barricades. Investigators believed that Kraus might have been intoxicated during the incident. After being charged criminally, Kraus was found mentally competent to stand trial. To avoid trial in late 2022, Kraus pleaded guilty to second degree unintentional murder (the second degree intentional murder charged was dropped) and second-degree assault with a dangerous weapon. He admitted to the court that the night he killed Knajdek he was under the influence of illegal narcotics and that he intentionally drove his car into barricades that blocked the street. He was sentenced to 20 years in prison.

== Background ==
A series of protests and civil unrest in the U.S. city of Minneapolis began on June 3, 2021, as a reaction to the police killing of Winston Boogie Smith, a 32-year-old black American man.

Civil unrest began in the Uptown district on June 3 when few details of the incident were known. Two nights of protests followed that included looting and rioting. Protests were held over subsequent days with demonstrators periodically occupying a street intersection near where Smith was killed.

== Vehicle-ramming attack ==
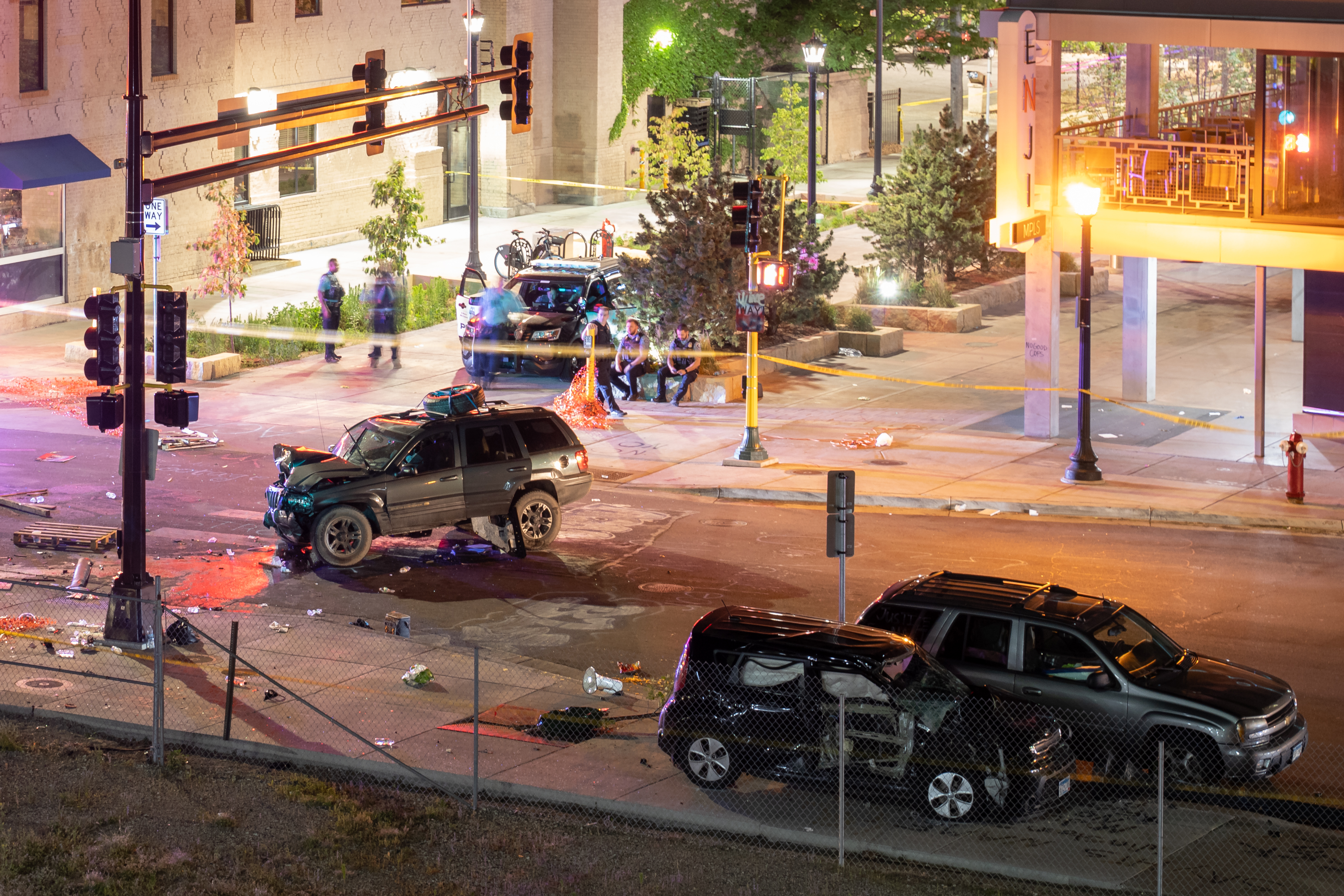
Damaged vehicles, June 13, 2021

The evening of June 13, 2021, demonstrators blocked the intersection of West Lake Street and Girard Avenue for an event, with some playing volleyball and lawn games. At approximately 11:39 p.m. CDT, Nicholas Kraus, in a Jeep Grand Cherokee, drove into the crowd at a high speed, striking a parked vehicle that had been used to block off the intersection to traffic, which then collided with protesters. One protester was killed, and three others suffered injuries that were not life-threatening. Demonstrators, who said Kraus was trying to flee the scene after the crash, detained him until police arrived. Kraus was treated at a hospital and then booked into a Hennepin County jail that night on probable cause of criminal vehicular homicide, driving on a cancelled license, and providing false information to police.

=== Victims ===
==== Deona Marie Knajdek ====
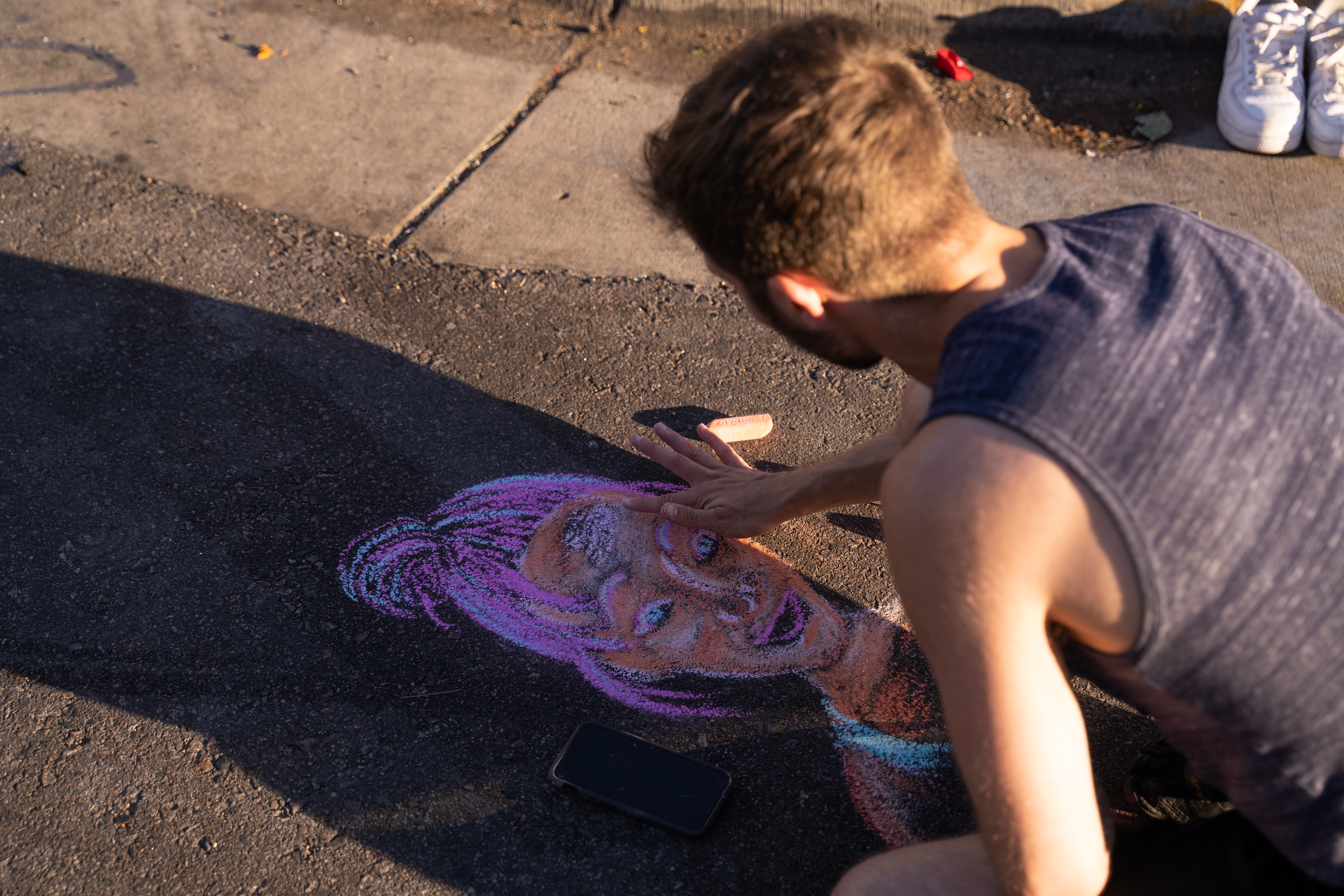
Chalk art depiction of Knajdek, June 14, 2021

The deceased victim was Deona Marie Knajdek, a 31-year-old woman from Minneapolis. Initial news reports identified her as Deona M. Knajdek Some reports also identified her as Deona Marie Knajdek Erickson, Deona Erickson, or Deona Marie. She used the name Deona Marie on her Facebook social media profile.

According to her family, the car that was struck belonged to Knajdek, and she had parked it there as a blockade to protect protesters. Her family described her as an active supporter of Black Lives Matter and social activists on issues of police brutality and gun violence. Knajdek was a program manager for The Cottages Group, a home health care provider. She had two daughters, who were 11 and 13 at the time of her death. Knajdek had participated in daily protests over the killing of Winston Smith since June 3.

==== Other victims ====
Three other people were injured in the collision. One protester with non-life-threatening injuries and Knajdek were transported to Hennepin County Medical Center by ambulance. Two others later sought medical treatment for non-critical injuries related to the crash.

=== Suspect ===
Nicholas D. Kraus, a 35-year-old man from Saint Paul, Minnesota, was the driver of the vehicle that struck the demonstrators. Kraus had five prior convictions for driving under the influence spanning 2008–2016, and his license had been canceled in 2013 for safety concerns. He also had prior convictions for driving without a valid license, assault, failure to have insurance, and providing a false name to police.

== Criminal proceedings ==
=== Investigation and charges ===
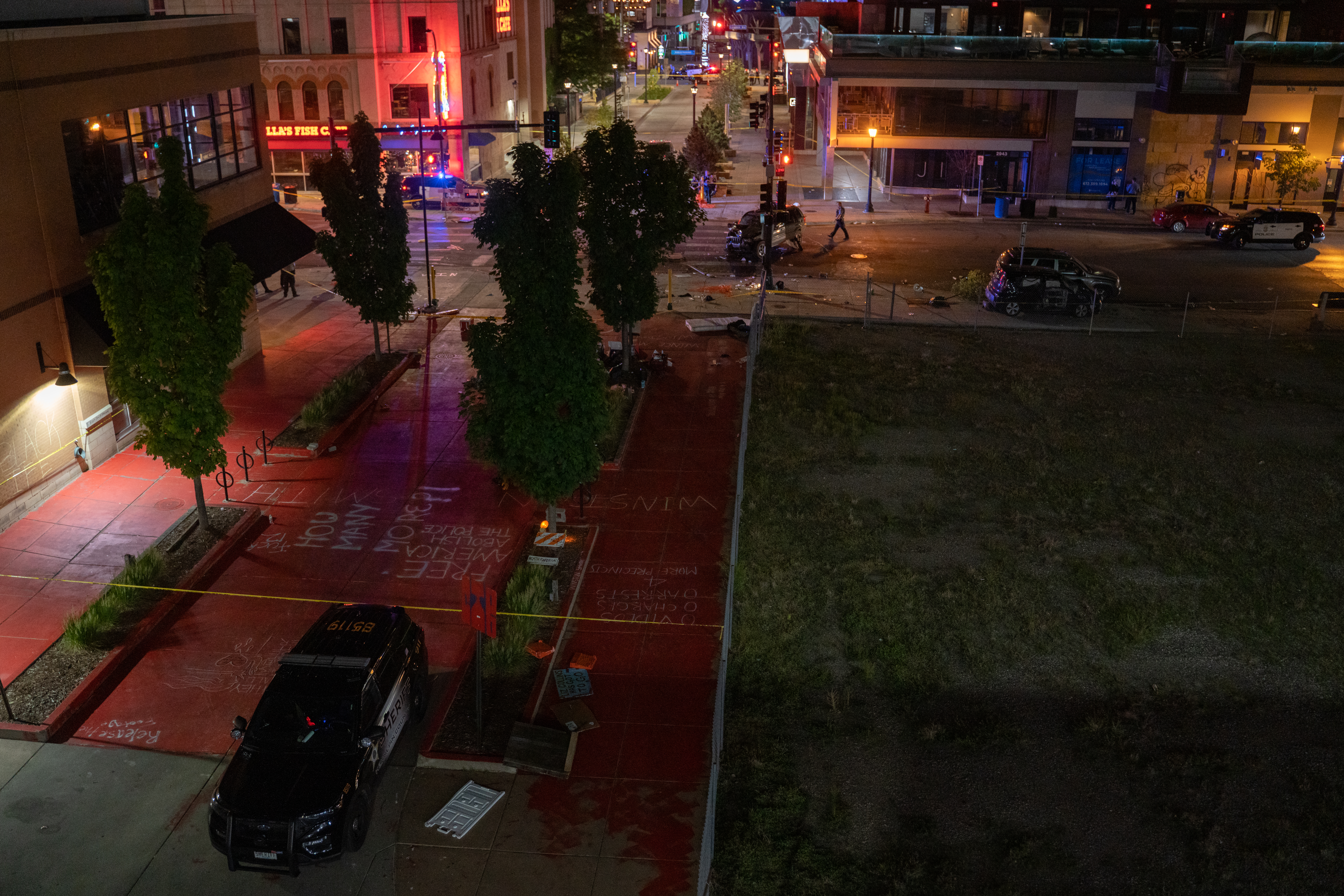
Damaged vehicles several hours after the attack, June 14, 2021

Kraus allegedly made statements to police in which he repeatedly admitted to operating the vehicle. When questioned, he reportedly gave "illogical and irrelevant answers", which led police to believe he was intoxicated. Kraus later allegedly admitted to investigators that he had intentionally accelerated towards the demonstrators in hopes of clearing the barricades that had been placed to protect the protestors.

According to search warrants filed in court on June 15, 2021, officials believed that footage captured by a closed-circuit camera appeared to show that the car's brake lights did not activate prior to the crash. Three hours before the June 13, 2021, vehicle attack, a demonstrator had climbed a pole and spray painted a surveillance camera located at the intersection of West Lake Street and Girard Avenue. Officials believed the camera would have captured "crucial evidence" about crash, and law enforcement sought the public's assistance to identify a suspect who painted over the camera. A witness reported that the car seemed to accelerate as it approached the demonstration. Minneapolis police said in a statement shortly after the attack that they believed that the driver may have been under the influence of drugs or alcohol, but field sobriety tests were not performed due to his injuries.

On June 16, 2021, Kraus was charged with second-degree intentional murder and two counts of assault with a deadly weapon in relation to the crash. Hennepin County Attorney Mike Freeman said in a statement that Kraus had been intoxicated during the attack and that he accelerated his vehicle rather than braking. Kraus was held in jail on a $1 million bond. He made his first court appearance on June 17, 2021, in Hennepin County District Court and was ordered by the judge to undergo a psychological evaluation to determine if he was competent to stand trial.

=== Guilty plea ===
Kraus was found mentally competent to stand trial after a court proceeding on September 10, 2021. Kraus’ trial was initially scheduled to begin on March 21, 2022, but it was delayed to July and then to October of that same year. Just as his the trial was about to commence, Kraus pleaded guilty in Hennepin County District Court on October 24, 2022. The charge of intentional second-degree murder charge was amended to unintentional second-degree murder, a lesser charge. Kraus also pleaded guilty to second-degree assault with a dangerous weapon for injuring another protester with his car. A second assault charge for another injured protester was dropped. At his sentencing hearing on November 23, 2022, Kraus was sentenced concurrently to 20 years in prison for the unintentional murder charge and 3.75 years for the assault charge. Kraus admitted to investigators and before the court that he had driven his vehicle at a high speed toward the makeshift barricades the night of June 13, 2021. His attorney said that he was unaware there was a demonstration and that he did not have a political motive for his actions.

== Memorial and funeral ==
Hundreds of mourners gathered at the site of the attack for a vigil on the evening of June 14, 2021, and demonstrations continued that evening and in the following days. Knajdek's funeral was held on June 21, 2021, in her hometown of Rush City, Minnesota.

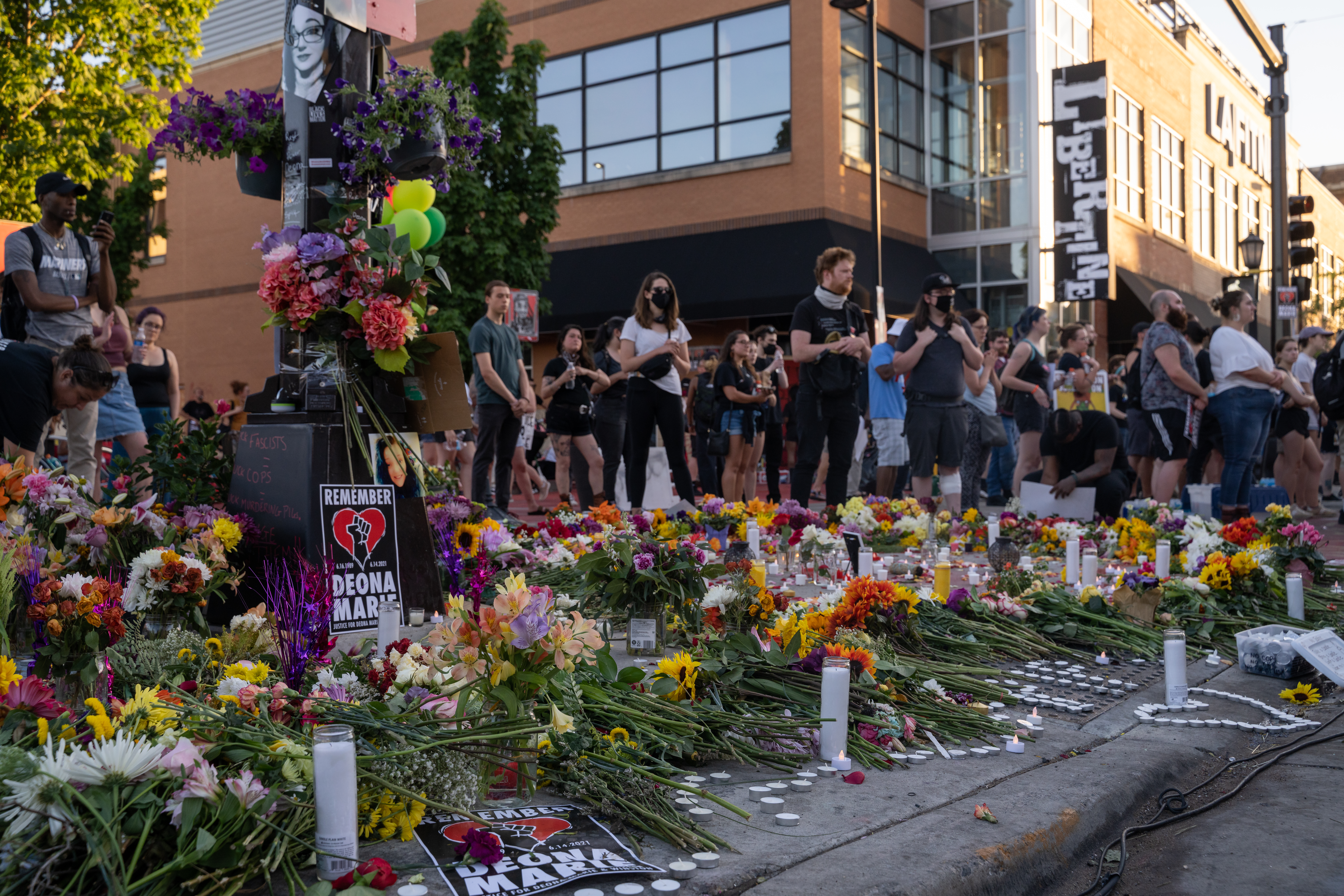
Memorial for Knajdek, June 15, 2021

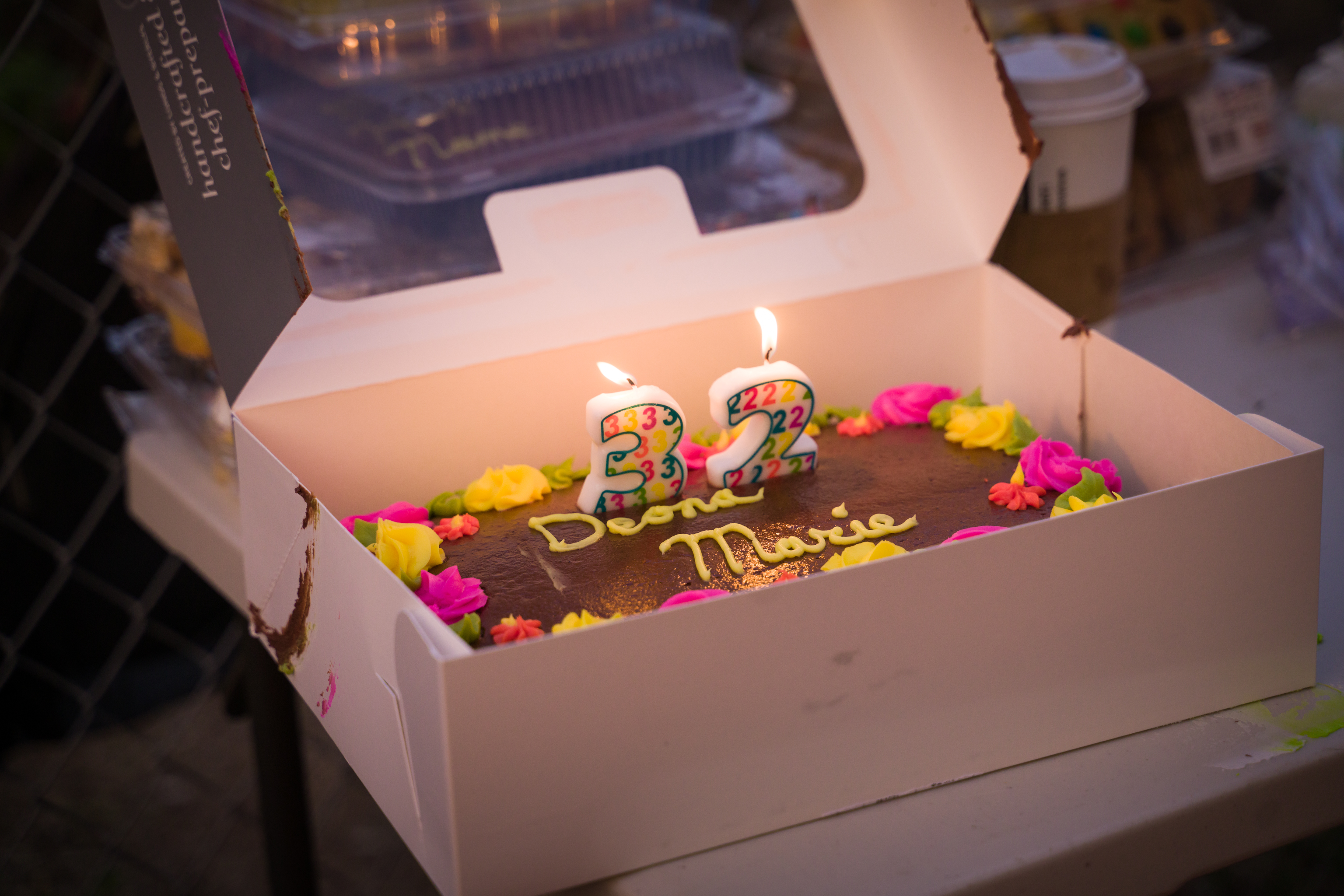
32nd birthday memorial, June 16, 2021

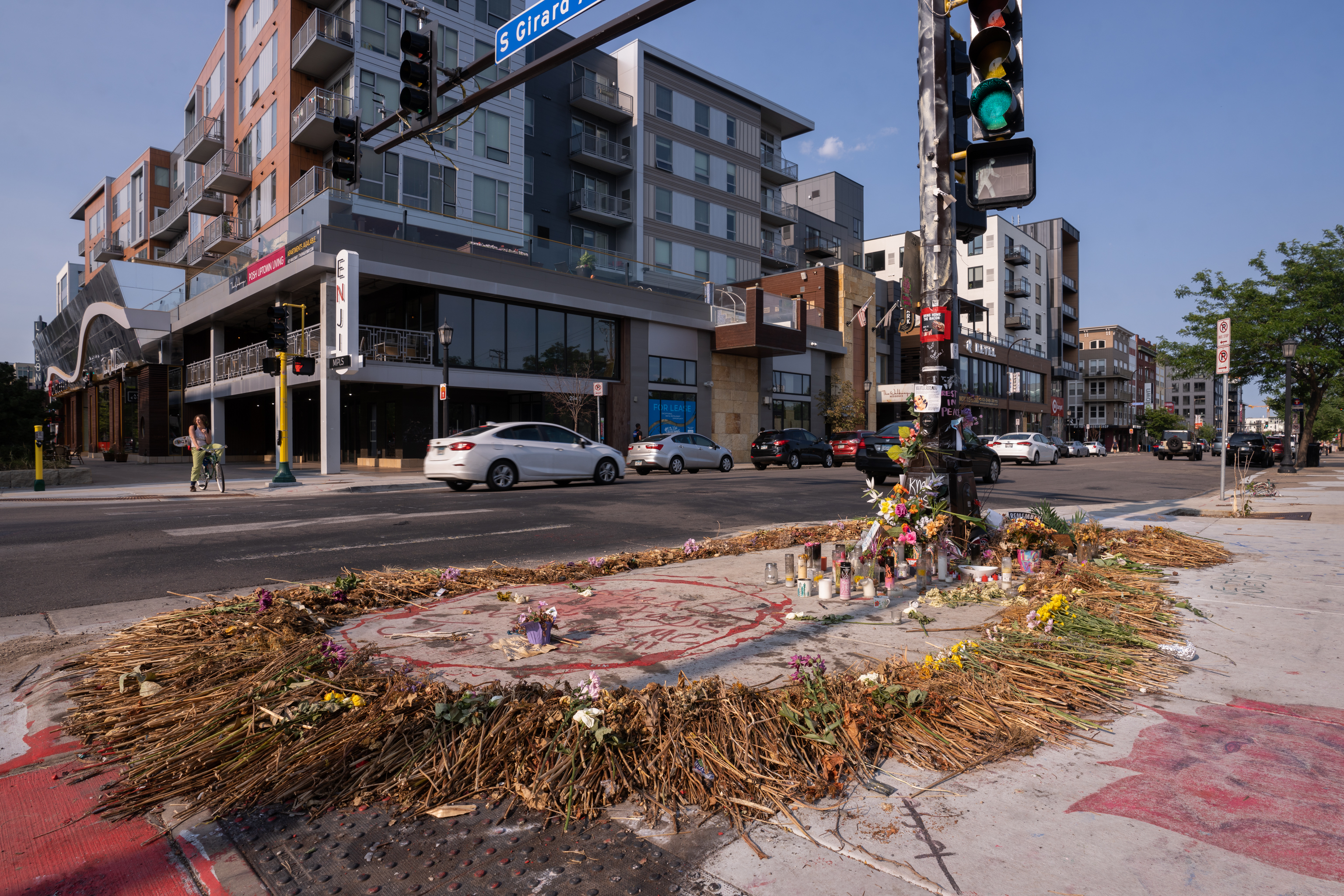
Makeshift memorial, June 30, 2021

== See also ==
- 2020–2021 United States racial unrest
- 2020–2021 Minneapolis–Saint Paul racial unrest
- George Floyd protests in Minneapolis–Saint Paul
- List of civil unrest in Minneapolis–Saint Paul
- List of vehicle-ramming incidents during George Floyd protests
