= Exco =

ExCo may refer to:

- Executive Committee (disambiguation)
- Executive Council (disambiguation)
- Experimental College (disambiguation)
- Exco Levi, Canadian musician
- Exco International, a British money brokerage
- Exco Technologies, a Canadian tool and die supplier
- Excavation Contractor or Company, ExCo, Ex/Co, Ex. Co.
