= Experimental College =

Experimental College may refer to:

- Free university, a movement for adult education with uncredited classes open to the public
- Experimental College (Tufts University), a college at Tufts University
- Experimental College of the Twin Cities, Minnesota
- University of Wisconsin Experimental College
- Experimental College, at San Francisco State University
