= 2020 Minneapolis false rumors riot =

Unrest after a suicide incident

- Part of 2020–2023 Minneapolis–Saint Paul racial unrest
- Hennepin County sheriff officers on patrol after looting and vandalism on August 27, 2020
- Date: August 26–28, 2020 (3 days)
- Location: Minneapolis, Minnesota, U.S. 44.973945°N 93.274809°W
- Caused by: False rumors about the suicide of a homicide suspect; Mistrust between residents and officials
- Methods: Rioting, vandalism, looting, arson, and assault
- Status: Rioting ended August 28, 2020

Aftermath
- Deaths: 0
- Injuries: 2 police officers
- Arrested: 132
- Damage: 77 properties, including 5 set on fire
- Charged: 30: 27 by county officials; 3 by federal officials
- State of emergency declared August 26–31, 2020

False rumors of a police shooting resulted in rioting, arson, and looting in the U.S. city of Minneapolis from August 26–28, 2020. The events began as a reaction to the suicide of Eddie Sole Jr., a 38-year old black man who was being pursued by Minneapolis police officers for his alleged involvement in a homicide. At approximately 2 p.m. on August 26, Sole died after he shot himself in the head as officers approached to arrest him. False rumors quickly spread on social media that Minneapolis police officers had fatally shot Sole. To quell unrest, Minneapolis police released closed-circuit television surveillance footage that captured Sole's suicide, which was later confirmed by a Hennepin County Medical Examiner's autopsy report.

The August "false rumors" riot occurred as the city was still dealing with the aftermath of the George Floyd protests and riots three months prior. Misinformation about the manner of Floyd's murder led to persistent mistrust between city residents and public officials. On the night of August 26, 2020, at least 132 people were arrested for violence and looting, as damage to 77 properties occurred in the Minneapolis–Saint Paul metropolitan region, including five buildings that were set on fire. Minnesota government officials amassed nearly 1,000 members of law enforcement and 400 Minnesota National Guard troops to keep the peace. An 8:00 p.m. curfew was implemented on August 27, 2020, with 30 people being arrested in the first hour. During the duration of the curfew until it expired at 6:00 a.m. on August 28, over 100 people were arrested, including 80 for curfew violations.

A state of emergency declaration and curfew orders expired on August 31. Three Minnesota residents were later convicted of federal charges for an arson attack on the Target Corporation headquarters building the night of August 26. A Minneapolis man pled guilty to a state assault charge for striking an officer with an object during the riot.

== Background ==
The initial cause of civil disorder was the suicide of a homicide suspect in downtown Minneapolis on August 26, 2020. The homicide was the 52nd of the year in the city. Many residents were still on edge from the murder of George Floyd on May 25, 2020, when the Minneapolis Police Department had mischaracterized Floyd's death as due to "medical distress" in early statements about the incident. Protesters reacting to news of a new shooting death, that video later showed was a suicide, did not trust initial police accounts of the incident. Posts on social media websites suggested that Minneapolis police were responsible for the man's death.

The civil disorder also came as part of the larger Black Lives Matter movement and protests against police brutality in 2020. Late at night on August 15, 2020, in Minneapolis, a group of approximately 50 people marched to the city's fifth police precinct station in what was initially described as a peaceful protest, but it became violent when people threw rocks at windows, threw paint on the building, and shot commercial-grade fireworks at police officers, before fleeing the scene. The August 23, 2020, shooting of Jacob Blake, an African American man, in Kenosha, Wisconsin, by a police officer, led to protests and unrest that spilled into Minnesota. On August 24, 2020, in Minneapolis, a 100-person protest over Blake's shooting took place in the city's downtown area, and after the main protest group disbanded, some protesters broke windows and threatened to breach a jail facility, resulting in 11 arrests. One Minneapolis police officer suffered a broken hand during a confrontation with a demonstrator.

By August 2020, the downtown workforce in Minneapolis was at 85% of prior capacity, with many business closed and implementing remote work due to the COVID-19 pandemic, and with fewer people on the street there were concerns about the perceptions of crime and lack of police presence.

== Events ==
=== August 26 ===
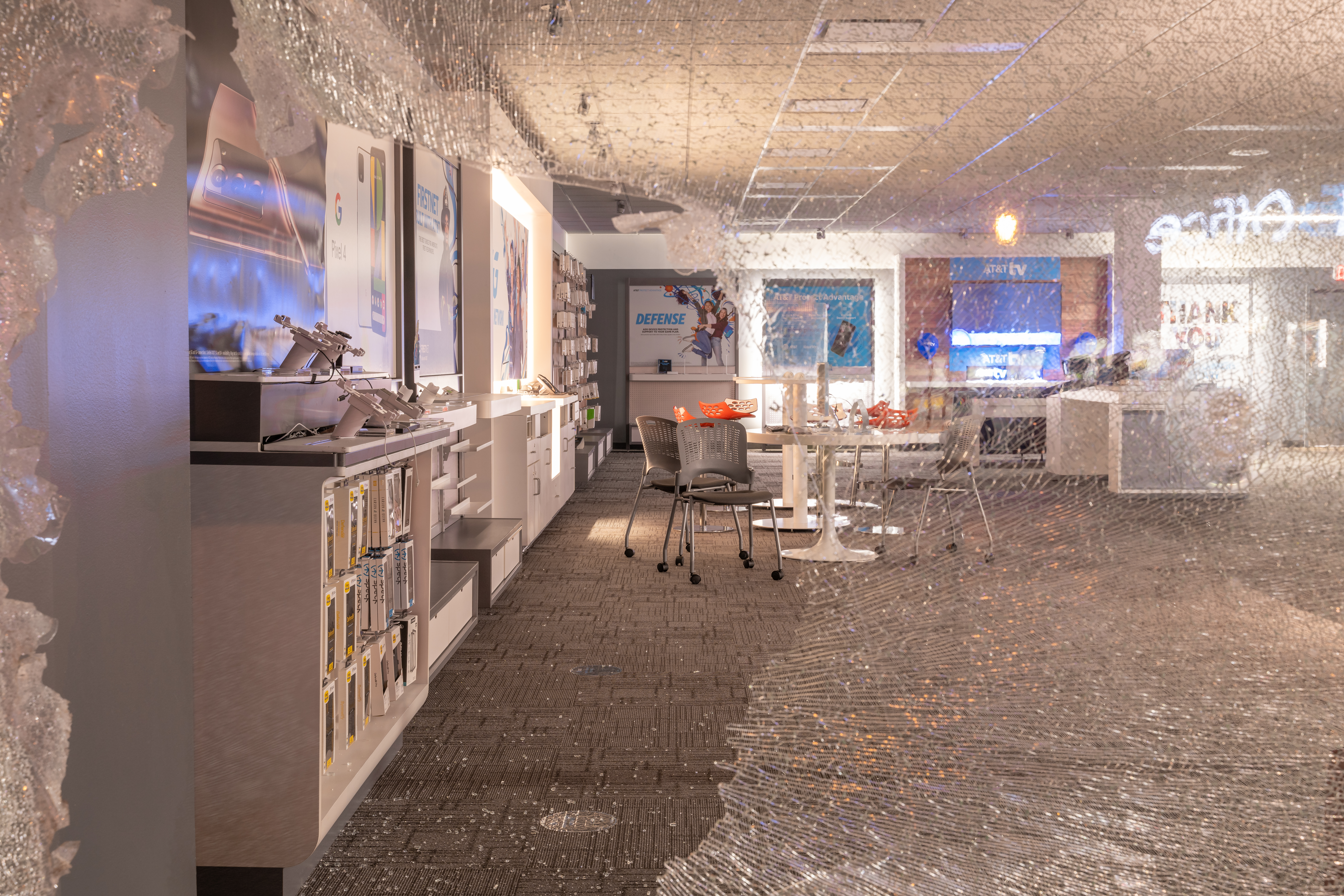
AT&T store damaged by vandalism, August 26–27, 2020

Eddie George Gordon, a 61-year-old from Rush City, Minnesota, died from multiple gunshot wounds while inside a parking ramp near 10th Street North and Currie Avenue West at 2 p.m. on August 26, 2020, in downtown Minneapolis. Police sources believed he had been in an altercation with a man and woman, who both fled the scene on foot. Police apprehended the woman, but the man fled. At 6 p.m. the police had tracked him down on Nicollet Avenue and closed in for an arrest. The man was later identified as Eddie Sole Jr., a 38-year-old from Minneapolis. As police forces advanced to make an arrest, Sole Jr. shot himself in the head while standing on a sidewalk of the 800 block of Nicollet Avenue along Nicollet Mall, just before officers reached him. Within an hour of the suicide a large crowd had gathered at the scene.

The encounter between Sole Jr. and the police quickly sparked social media rumors about the manner of his death. At a Black Entrepreneur State Fair event on the other side of the Mississippi River in Father Hennepin Bluff Park, nearly one mile (1.6 km) away from where the death occurred, a DJ announced to the crowd that police were covering up a death with a suicide story. A group marched across the Stone Arch Bridge to downtown to protest what they believed was a police shooting. That evening protesters swelled into the city's downtown area and reached what was estimated as a crowd of 500 people.

In public statements, police denied that they had fired weapons at Sole Jr. during pursuit and released a surveillance video of his suicide to quell rumors that it was an officer involved shooting. Minneapolis Police Chief Medaria Arradondo sent text messages to several racial justice advocates seeking help in circulating the video, such as to Nekima Levy Armstrong who attempted to contain the spread of false information. However, some in the crowd downtown began breaking windows at nearby businesses, resulting in property destruction and looting at many stores and restaurants. As the scene downtown became more violent, some in the crowd urged others stop the destruction, including a person on a megaphone who shouted, "We have the video — the man killed himself!"

At 9:30 p.m. Minneapolis Mayor Jacob Frey publicly requested assistance from the Minnesota National Guard to restore order. Minnesota Governor Tim Walz activated troops just before 11:00 p.m. and the first troops arrived downtown just before midnight. Frey imposed a citywide curfew overnight, and both Walz and Frey declared a state of emergency.

Destruction overnight reached a total of 72 property locations in Minneapolis and four locations in neighboring Saint Paul. In Minneapolis, five businesses were set on fire, including a downtown restaurant and three other businesses located miles away from the city's downtown area. Two residents had to be rescued off the second story of a building after a China Wok Chinese restaurant caught fire. The rioting in downtown Minneapolis mostly stretched along Nicollet Mall from 5th to 12th streets, though it spread to a gas station and liquor store near Loring Park. Several people broke into the Target Corporation headquarters building, lighting fires at the entrance and in the mailroom. The rioting also an effect beyond downtown Minneapolis. Several businesses in south Minneapolis, Uptown, and Dinkytown were vandalized and looted, as was a liquor store in the suburb of Brooklyn Park.

Two Minneapolis police officers were seriously injured during the unrest and hospitalized, but the injuries were not believed to be life-threatening. One of the injuries, captured on a bystander's video, showed an officer being hit in the head by a trash can lid and becoming unconscious. Some bystanders cheered when the object hit the officer.

=== August 27–28 ===
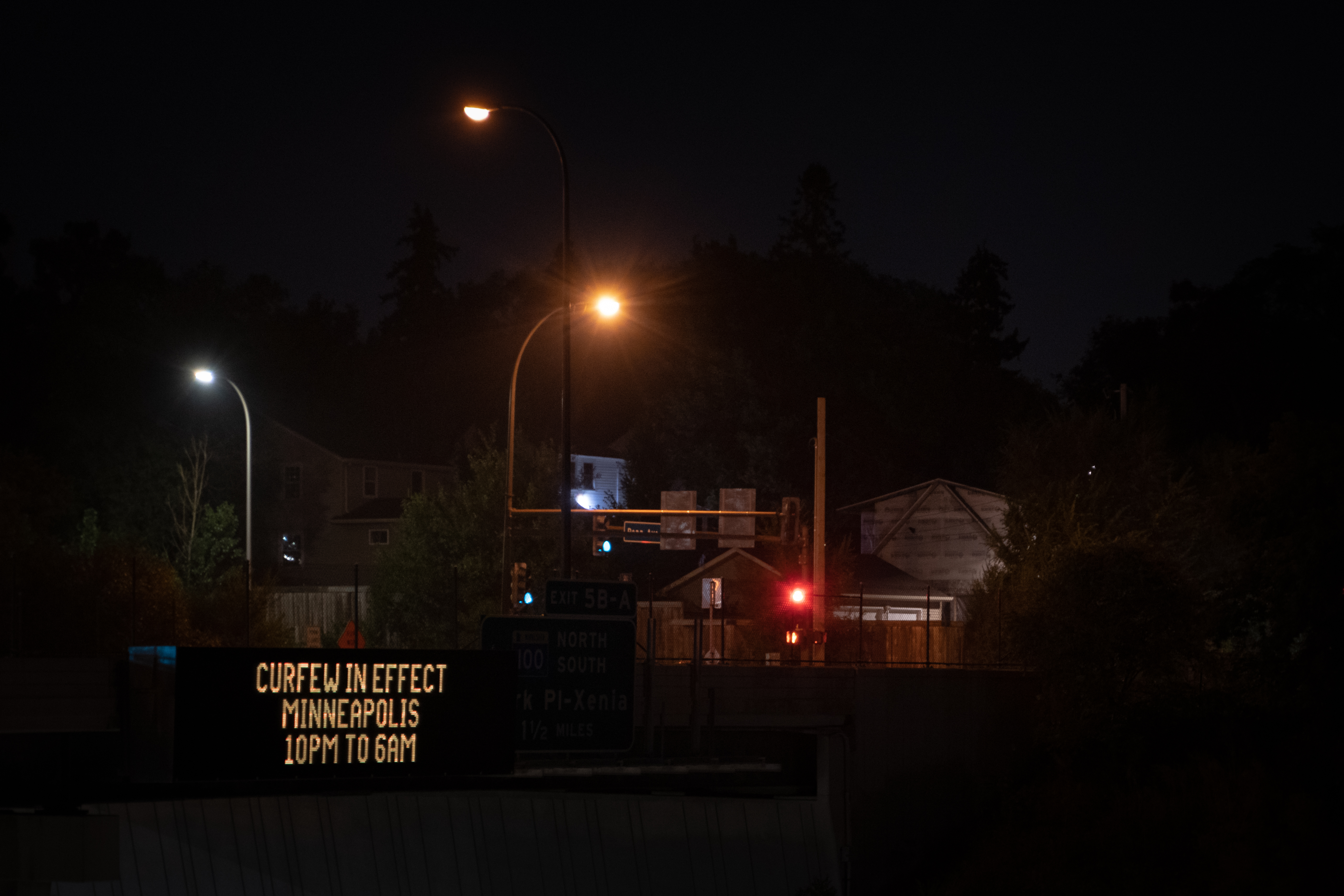
A digital sign on Interstate 394 announcing a curfew, August 27, 2020

To prevent further rioting and looting, officials put in place a curfew on Thursday, August 27, 2020, from 8 p.m. to 6 a.m. on Friday, August 28, 2020. Nearly 1,000 members of law enforcement and 400 Minnesota National Guard troops amassed in the metro area to prevent additional crime. Thirty people were arrested between 8 p.m. and 9 p.m. on Thursday for violating the curfew, with 50 additional people arrested for curfew violations during the following hours between Thursday night and Friday morning. At least 27 people were arrested and charged for other crimes during the rioting, including burglary, arson, assault, and drug possession. State and local officials declined to issue a new curfew after the curfew expired at 6 a.m. on Friday, August 28. However, Minneapolis city officials extended the state of emergency to 8 a.m. on Monday, August 31. National Guard troops and law enforcement were kept mobilized.

On August 28, 2020, the Hennepin County Medical Examiner's Office identified the person who shot themselves as Eddie Sole Jr., a 38-year old black man from Minneapolis. The examiner listed his manner of death as a suicide.

=== August 29–31 ===
After beginning on Wednesday night, August 26, 2020, the state of emergency ended at 8 a.m. on Monday, August 31, 2020.

== Aftermath ==
=== Suicide video controversy ===
As protesters gathered in downtown Minneapolis the evening of August 26, 2020, the Minneapolis Police Department sent out a message via the Twitter website that contained an embedded video: "*WARNING: This video contains graphic images. This evening, a murder suspect committed suicide as police approached them at 8th & Nicollet. No officer weapons were fired. This is a tragedy for our community that is still hurting."

Release of the video generated controversy though allowable under a set special circumstances in Minnesota Statutes. Some Minneapolis officials believed that quick release of the video was necessary to stop rumors of a police shooting. City officials had to weigh pain of people seeing the graphic content with their intention of stopping rioting and looting. Minneapolis police and many media outlets took down postings of the video later in the evening on August 26, 2020.

=== Property damage ===
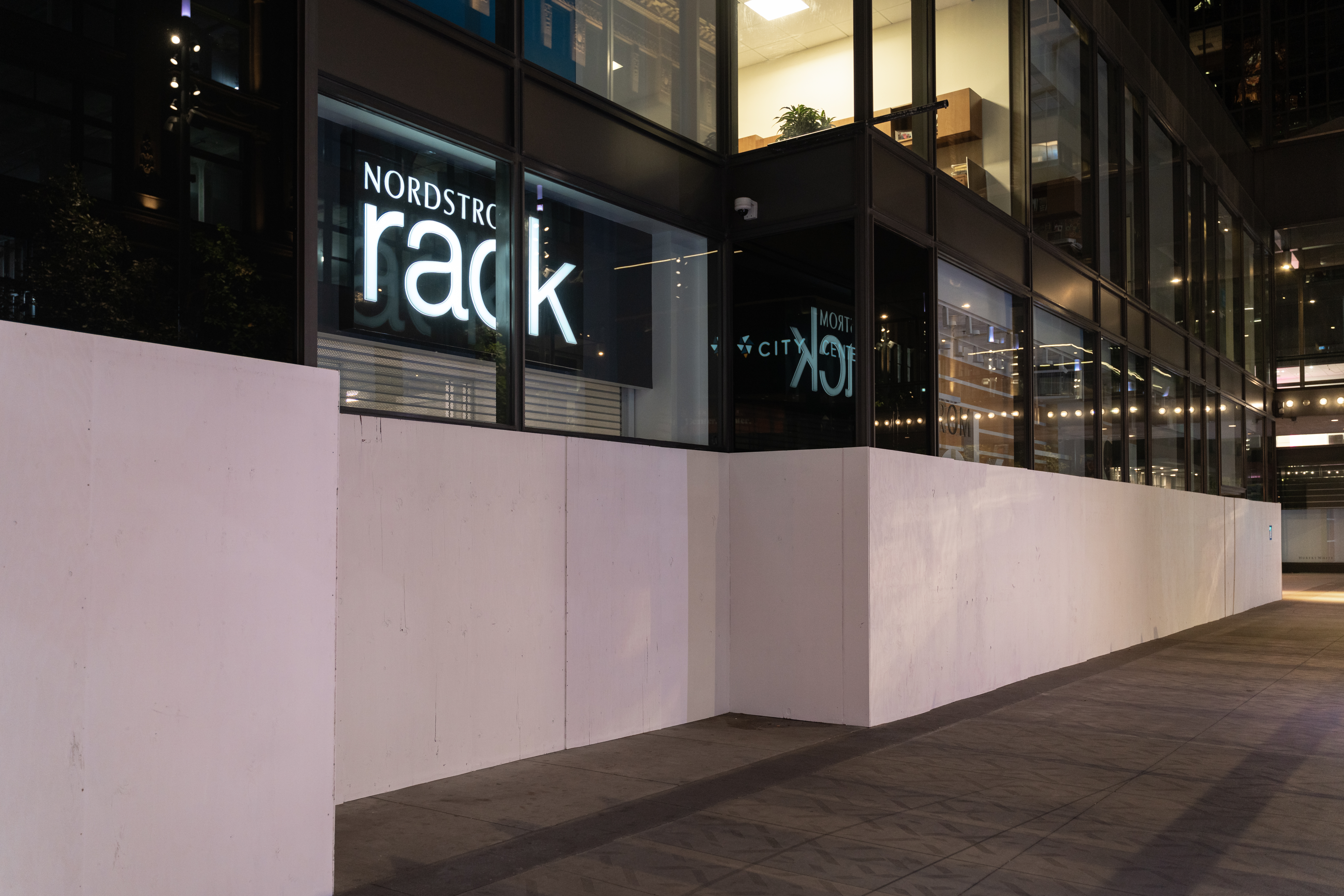
A boarded up Nordstrom Rack store on October 4, 2020, that was damaged by looters during the August riot

Seventy-seven properties were damaged during the unrest. A report by the Star Tribune tracked damage to 72 properties in Minneapolis, including five with fire damage, and damage to four properties in Saint Paul. Most damage occurred on Nicollet Mall between 5th and 12th streets. A liquor store in the Minneapolis suburb of Brooklyn Park was also looted during the period of unrest. The five Minneapolis businesses set on fire on August 26, 2020, included the Target Corporation building, Brits Pub on the Nicollet Mall in downtown, and three businesses in south Minneapolis—a Tires Plus store, a Walgreens drug store, and a China Wok restaurant. It was unclear to investigators if the fire at China Wok was directly related to the unrest or not. The south Minneapolis area had also been at the epicenter of heavy rioting after Floyd's murder in late May 2020, including where a police station was torched.

Officials believed that their experience with the unrest in the days after the murder of George Floyd in May 2020 led to a speedier response during the August 2020 events that distinguished people protesting peacefully and those causing destruction. Following Floyd's murder, more than 1,500 property locations in Minneapolis—Saint Paul were damaged or destroyed by rioting. At the time of the August 2020 unrest, downtown Minneapolis businesses were said to be struggling from closures related to the COVID-19 pandemic and unrest. For the dozens of business that were broken into and looted, the August riot was considered another challenging economic setback. The National Review speculated that the unrest and rioting in Minneapolis in 2020 could mark a decades-long period of stagnation and decline, similar to what cities such as Los Angeles, Detroit, and Newark experienced after historic unrest.

Dozens of businesses closed temporarily during the unrest. Kam Talebi, owner of the downtown Brit's Pub, remarked on August 27, 2020, about broader conversations to address the unrest in Minneapolis, "I hope within that there's a priority of safety for residents and the businesses. It's just tough to be able to operate right now in downtown Minneapolis." Brit's Pub was looted and much of the interior destroyed by fire. It reopened seven months later, in March 2021, after extensive clean up and refurbishing. In 2022, Wild Greg's Saloon restaurant in downtown closed and cited the riots in 2020 as one of several factors negatively affecting business activity.

The non-profit organization Agate Housing and Services announced in late 2022 a $25 million redevelopment project to convert the former China Wok restaurant property on the 2800 block of 27th Avenue South in Minneapolis into a homeless shelter and group home.

=== Mass arrests ===
State and local officials arrested at least 132 people during the unrest that featured looting, reports of shots fired, thrown bottles at police, and the discharge of commercial grade fireworks. Of those arrested, 27 were charged by Hennepin County officials, all of whom were Minnesota residents, with home addresses in Minneapolis, Saint Paul, several suburban cities, and Saint Cloud. Four of the arrests were of people who allegedly broke into the Pixie Liquor store in Brooklyn Park, Minnesota, during the unrest. Two of the people charged were for assault of police officers who responded to the riots.

== Investigations and legal proceedings ==
=== Homicide investigation ===
The investigation into the homicide of Eddie George Gordon revealed that he had been in an altercation with Eddie Sole Jr. and an unnamed woman around 2 p.m. on August 26, 2020, in the Ramp A parking garage in downtown Minneapolis. Sole Jr. pulled out a gun and shot Gordon in the head. By August 31, 2020, police sources were not sure what provoked the incident. Both men had connections to the Salvation Army's Harbor Light Center homeless shelter next door to the parking garage, with Gordon making occasional night stays since 2017 and Sole Jr. calling it his home for the past two-and-a-half years. It was also unclear to investigators why Sole Jr. shot himself as officers closed in.

=== Target Corporation building arson attack ===
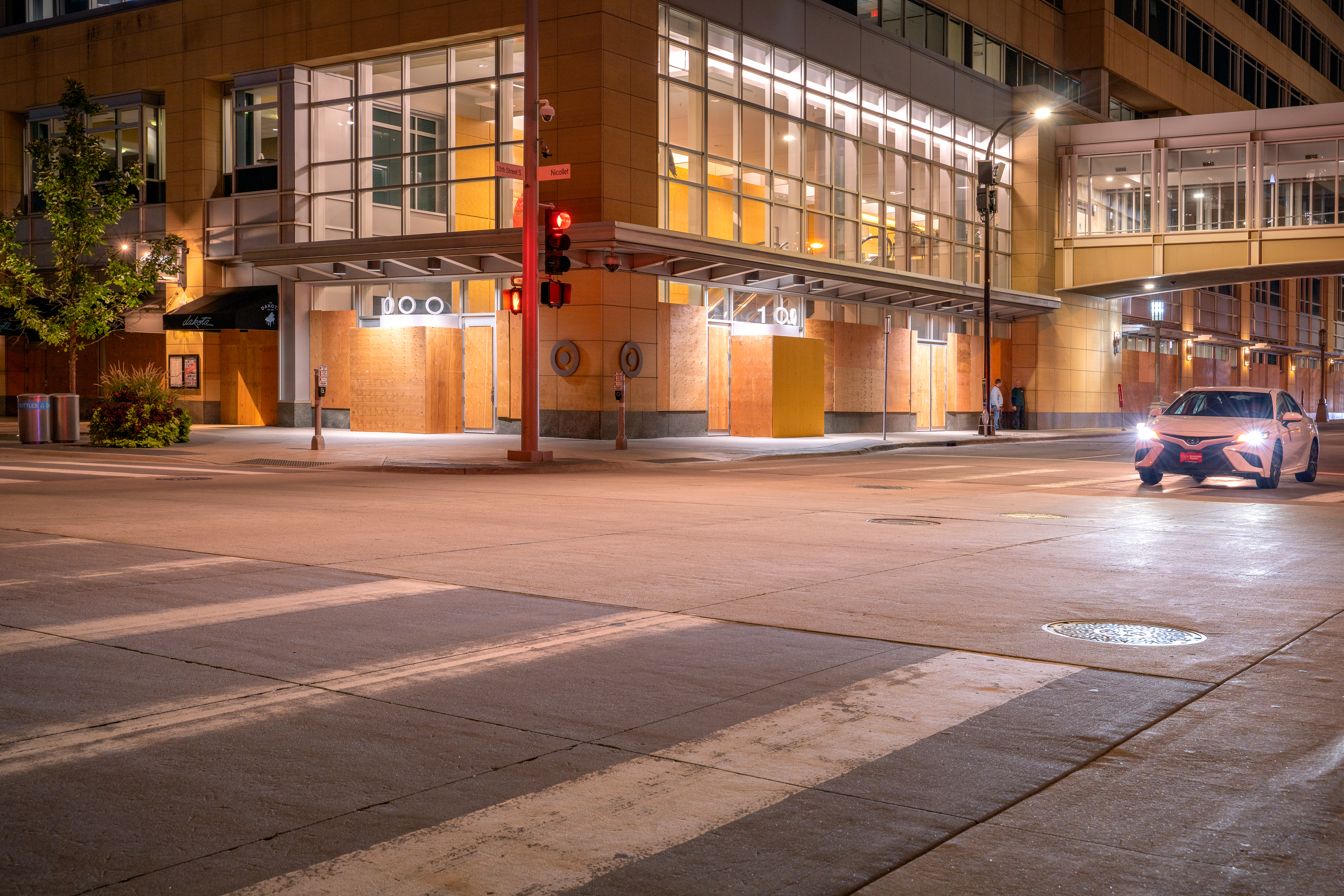
The boarded up Target Corporation headquarters in Minneapolis, September 10, 2020

Several federal and local law enforcement agencies launched an investigation of acts of arson. Three men from the Twin Cities metropolitan area were indicted in United States district court for setting fires at the downtown headquarters of the Target Corporation on the evening of August 26, 2020. Federal authorities said the fire caused $1 million in damages.

Shador T.C. Jackson, a 24-year old from Richfield, Minnesota, was accused of using a construction sign to break the glass entrance to the building. Several people went inside the building during the rioting. Jackson intentionally set a fire on a counter in the mailroom and Victor D. Edwards, a 31-year old from Saint Paul, Minnesota, added liquid accelerant to it. Leroy L.P. Williams, a 34-year old from Minneapolis, also entered the mailroom. Williams was a relative Eddie George Gordon who was shot and killed earlier in the day, beginning the manhunt that led to the unrest. Surveillance video captured the three men fleeing the mailroom. Williams allegedly returned to the Target building and attempted to start another fire at its entrance. Prior to the incident, all three defendants had felony records in Minnesota for violent crimes.

Jackson and Williams pled guilty to conspiracy to commit arson in connection to the August 26, 2020, incident. Jackson was sentenced in June 2021 to 33 months in federal prison. Williams, however, requested to withdraw his guilty plea, which the court granted.

The charge against Edwards went before a federal trial in mid-2021. Authorities alleged that Edwards had illegally entered and looted several downtown businesses and participated in acts of arson at the Target Corporation and possibly at Brit's Pub. After a four-day trial, the jury on August 12, 2021, convicted Edwards on one count of riot and one count of arson. On December 29, 2021, he was sentenced to 9 1/3 months in federal prison and ordered to pay $941,682.28 in restitution.

William's case went to trial in October 2023. Surveillance had video captured him attempting to set fire to a pile of cardboard inside the Target Corporation building until he was interrupted by another person. After a three-day jury trial, Williams was convicted on one count of arson. At a hearing on January 31, 2024, he was sentenced to 10 years in federal prison with the presiding judge, Paul Magnuson, concurring with the prosecution that the lengthy sentence be a deterrent in the event of further civil unrest.

=== Police officer assault ===
Brayshaun Gibson, a 28-year-old man from Minneapolis, was charged for burglary and for assaulting a police officer by throwing a 15-pound metal garbage can lid and knocking him unconscious on August 26. The injured officer allegedly had a connection to Gibson whose vehicle was also involved in a recent burglary. Gibson said that he was eating at downtown restaurant and became angry when learning of the rumors of a possible police shooting, and he regretted being involved in the ensuing chaos. The officer was hospitalized for possible spinal injuries and underwent continued treatment and therapy after being released. Gibson pled guilty in Hennepin County court on November 15, 2021. As part of the plea deal, several other riot and burglary charges against Gibson were dropped. Gibson was sentenced on January 5, 2022, to one year of house arrest with electronic monitoring.

== See also ==
- 2020–2023 Minneapolis–Saint Paul racial unrest
- List of incidents of civil unrest in Minneapolis–Saint Paul
