= 1967 Minneapolis disturbance =

- Part of Long, hot summer of 1967
- Date: July 20–23, 1967
- Location: Minneapolis, Minnesota, U.S.

Parties
Protesters, rioters	Minnesota; Minnesota National Guard; Minneapolis; Minneapolis Police Department

Lead figures
	Governor of Minnesota: Harold LeVander; Mayor of Minneapolis: Arthur Naftalin; Minneapolis Chief of Police: Calvin F. Hawkinson

Casualties
- Injuries: 24
- Arrested: 26

The 1967 Minneapolis disturbance was one of the 159 disturbances and riots that swept across cities in the United States during the "long, hot summer of 1967".

On July 20, 1967, widespread violence erupted in North Minneapolis, an area known for its Jewish and African American communities. The reported origins vary from the police mishandling a teen dispute over a wig to a pre-meditated plot by Black Panther leader Stokely Carmichael. Widespread violence, including rock and bottle-throwing at law enforcement and fires set to businesses along Plymouth Avenue, quickly engulfed the area and lasted three days.

Arthur Naftalin, mayor of Minneapolis, petitioned Minnesota Governor Harold LeVander for assistance from the Minnesota National Guard. After three days of demonstration, there were 26 arrests, 24 injured, and no deaths. Damage to public and private property totaled $4.2 million.

== Background ==
The civil rights movement occurring mainly in the southern portion of the United States to protest the unequal treatment of African Americans in business, politics, education, and housing resulted in rippling effects across the nation. Soon, civil uprisings extended outside the southern states. Cities like Boston, Milwaukee, and Minneapolis experienced similar racial tensions that erupted in violence.

Before 1960, restrictive housing guidelines prevented the working-class African American and Jewish communities from residing in certain parts of Minneapolis. Because of this, the two marginalized communities found common ground in North Minneapolis, where they built businesses, friendships, and families.

After World War II, societal opinions toward the Jewish community shifted away from anti-semitism. With this, business and job opportunities became available to Jewish citizens outside of North Minneapolis. The Black community, however, did not receive similar treatment. This imbalance created fissures between the two communities. Between the growing Civil Rights movements and rising tensions in North Minneapolis, a riot erupted in 1966. The period of unrest was short-lived. It resulted in arson and looting. For a short period, the Minnesota National Guard deployed to quell the violence. In the aftermath of the 1966 riot, a community center called "The Way" was established on Plymouth Avenue, the cultural and business hub of North Minneapolis. This center became a nucleus for neighborhood extracurricular activity, including meetings and music. It is also known as the hub for community activism in North Minneapolis.

after a disturbance born of disillusionment and anger exploded spontaneously in the streets. Its emergency purpose was to help calm the neighborhood by providing an off-the-street facility for youth and a meeting place for residents.

== Rioting ==
The reports on the genesis of the riot on July 20, 1967, vary dramatically. Historical documents from the Federal Bureau of Investigation (FBI) allege that Stokely Carmichael, the Black Panther movement's political leader, met with acquaintances in North Minneapolis months before July 1967. The report states that Carmichael warned that "the blood will flow in the city of Minneapolis this summer. He allegedly communicated to the group that the protests would begin at the city's annual Aquatennial Parade.

Harry Moss, a co-founder of The Way Community Center and North Minneapolis resident, recalled the Plymouth Avenue unrest began when a black resident was shot by a Jewish business owner for petty theft.

Most news outlets report that the riots began when two teen girls were in an altercation over a wig at the Aquatennial Torchlight Parade. When Minneapolis police responded to the incident, one of the girls was met with extreme force, triggering an outcry for justice.

Residents gathered at The Way to organize a protest against the police brutality. The citizens marched along Plymouth Avenue to demand justice for police behavior. Soon police responded to the disturbance. Tensions rose as they attempted to break up the demonstration. Police allegedly struck a pregnant woman. From there, the protest became violent, including rock-throwing and Molotov cocktails. Protesters burned local Jewish businesses.

The protest continued into the next day. Minneapolis mayor Arthur Naftalin, petitioned governor Harold LeVander to activate the National Guard to restore order to the area. The governor ordered 600 National Guard Soldiers to deploy to the site. Milt Sunde and Ron Acks, two Minnesota Vikings football players, also serving in the Minnesota National Guard, responded to the riots. Federal troops also covered South Minneapolis and Saint Paul, Minnesota.

Throughout the three days of protest, African Americans expressed anger at police brutality, discriminatory housing, and education practices. Most of the property destruction focused on white authority figures.

== Damage ==
Protesters destroyed ten stores on Plymouth Avenue during the first night of violence. Fire consumed two local groceries stores: Silvers Food Market and Knox Food Market. Jewish residents owned both businesses.

By the time the violence subsided, there were three shootings, 36 arrests, 18 fires and 24 injuries. The total damage $4.2 million.

== Political response ==
The protesters consistently expressed discontent with discriminatory practices in Minneapolis. Local leaders held a public forum for residents to discuss grievances within the community.

"This will show them we are not going to take any more of the cops shoving and pushing us," said one protester.

Another explained the violence of the protesters was a normal response to social conditions. "You back a colored man into a corner and complain when he comes out fighting," he said.

Mayor Naftalin convened a grand jury of all-white residents to identify violent protestors and prosecute their actions. The grand jury concluded that police responded appropriately and did not fire weapons at the protesters, despite one young resident's report of a gunshot wound. The grand jury maintained that there was no evidence of police brutality.

The grand jury advised that The Way Community Center staff should be investigated for inciting the demonstration.

== See also ==
- List of incidents of civil unrest in Minneapolis–Saint Paul
