= List of incidents of civil unrest in Minneapolis–Saint Paul =

Protest events and episodes of civil disorder have occurred throughout the history of the Minneapolis–Saint Paul metropolitan area in the U.S. state of Minnesota. This list includes notable instances of civil unrest in the cities of Minneapolis or Saint Paul.

== Events ==
=== 1910s ===
- 1917 Twin Cities streetcar strike, an incident involving several instances of rioting, primarily in Saint Paul

=== 1930s ===
- Arthur and Edith Lee House (1931), a race riot 3,000 strong sparked by a black family buying a house in a white neighborhood
- Minneapolis general strike of 1934
- Bloody Friday (Minneapolis), an incident that involved the killing of two striking truck drivers on July 20, 1934

=== 1960s ===
- 1967 Minneapolis Riot, part of the “long, hot summer”, events about racism and police brutality

=== 1970s ===
- Women's Strike for Equality in Minneapolis and elsewhere in 1970
- Twin Cities Pride, a parade that began as a protest march in 1972

=== 2000s ===
- Experimental College of the Twin Cities, a continuation of a campus workers strike and protests in 2006
- 2008 Republican National Convention in St. Paul and related protests

=== 2010s ===
- Occupy Minnesota protests in 2011-2012
- Killing of Jamar Clark by a Minneapolis police officer in 2015 and the aftermath
- Killing of Philando Castile by a St. Anthony police officer in 2016 and the aftermath
- Killing of Justine Damond by a Minneapolis police officer in 2017 and the aftermath
- Dakota Access Pipeline protests and actions of solidarity in St. Paul and Minneapolis in 2016-2017
- U.S. national anthem protests (2016–present) where members of the Los Angeles Sparks walked off the court before Game 1 of WNBA finals in Minneapolis in 2017
- 2017 May Day protests in Minneapolis and elsewhere

=== 2020s ===
- Protests of government COVID-19 mitigation measures in St. Paul and elsewhere in 2020
- George Floyd protests in Minneapolis–Saint Paul after the Murder of George Floyd by a police officer on May 25, 2020
- 2020–2023 Minneapolis–Saint Paul racial unrest, a prolonged series of protests following Floyd's murder
- George Floyd Square occupied protest in 2020, 2021, and 2022
- 2020 Minneapolis false rumors riot
- Protests over the killing of Dolal Idd in 2021 and 2022
- Daunte Wright protests in 2021
- Protests in Minneapolis regarding the trial of Derek Chauvin in 2021
- 2021 Uptown Minneapolis unrest following the killings of Winston Boogie Smith and Deona M. Knajdek
- Stop Line 3 protests in 2021
- Protests over the killing of Amir Locke in 2022
- Gaza war protests in 2024
- Protests following the killing of Renée Good in 2026

== See also ==
- List of killings by law enforcement officers in Minnesota
- List of incidents of civil unrest in the United States
- Timeline of race relations and policing in Minneapolis–Saint Paul
