= Experimental College (Tufts University) =

Coordinates: 42°24′20.8″N 71°7′16.5″W

The Experimental College at Tufts University (also known as the Ex College), is located in Medford, Massachusetts. The college was founded in 1964 to expand the offerings of the undergraduate course curriculum.

The Experimental College offers credit-bearing courses at Tufts. These courses tend to involve issues of current importance and/or provide instruction on interdisciplinary subject areas that do not significantly overlap with what is being offered in the traditional departments. They are also intended to be discussion-based and participatory in nature.

The Ex-College offers courses taught by members of the Tufts Faculty, adjunct Visiting Lecturers, and Tufts undergraduates. The ExCollege Visiting Lecturer positions are open to the public, and those who are selected to teach range from advanced graduate students to business, law and computer science professionals, to PhD professors. All applicants are required to construct and submit their course proposals 5–8 months before the start of the semester. Fall instructors submit proposals the January before the fall semester. Spring instructors submit proposals the August before the spring semester. The selection process is competitive, and the ExCollege Board, comprising faculty, students and staff, selects 15 Visiting Lecturers from a pool of over 100 applicants each term. All applicants undergo an interview process with Tufts students and faculty, at least one of whom sits on the ExCollege board.

== See also ==
- Experimental college movement
- Experimental College of the Twin Cities
