= Seven Points (Minnesota) =

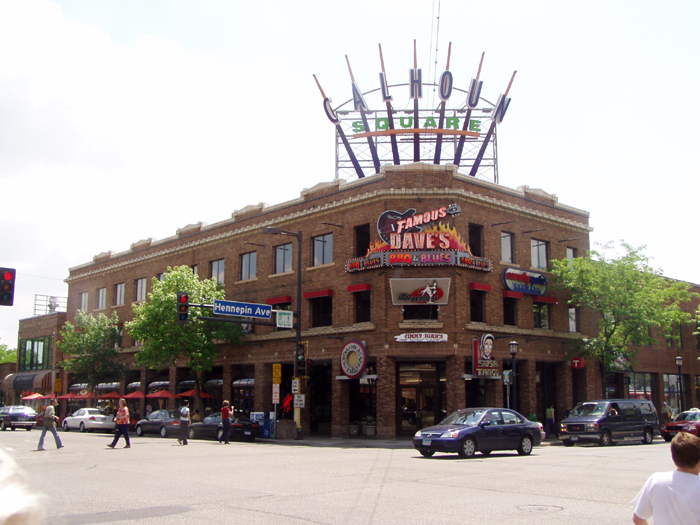
- Seven Points, then known as Calhoun Square, in 2006
- Location: Minneapolis, Minnesota, United States
- Coordinates: 44°56′51″N 93°17′50″W
- Opened: February 15, 1984; 42 years ago
- Owner: Northpond Partners
- Public transit: Metro Transit
- Website: calhounsquare.com

Seven Points is an indoor shopping mall opened on February 15, 1984, at the southeast corner of Hennepin Avenue and West Lake Street, the main intersection of the Uptown district of Minneapolis, Minnesota. The building was previously known as Calhoun Square until October 2020.

== History ==
The atrium-style indoor mall was created in an early 1980s style of redevelopment by local developer Ray Harris from a series of older buildings, including the Geanakoplos Building (1917).

In the early stages, neighborhood activists opposed to the project started the "Dump Updale" campaign. "Up" referred to Uptown; "dale" was a reference to suburban shopping malls in the Twin Cities whose names end in "dale" (e.g. Southdale Center, Ridgedale Center).

Harris's renovation and construction was finished in 1983, and he remained the owner until he sold the mall in 2004 to a Des Moines, IA, investment group.

In 2007, Calhoun Square was sold to an affiliate of New York-based BlackRock Inc. for $47.3 million. After a 2008 renovation, the mall drew new national and international names, including LA Fitness, H&M, and CB2.

Local ownership returned in 2014 when developer Stuart Ackerberg bought the mall from BlackRock, seeking to restore “the magic and the sizzle of Calhoun Square going back to the 1980s", when many of the tenants were local operators. The Ackerberg Group completed a remodel of the mall's interior in 2015.

The musician Prince wrote a song titled "Calhoun Square", released on disc two of his Crystal Ball CD.

Chicago-based investment firm Northpond Partners purchased the building for $34.5 million in October 2019.

On June 19, 2020, the owners of the building announced that Calhoun Square's name would be changed "to disavow the slavery advocate for which the building was originally named," John C. Calhoun. This follows the 2017 decision to rename the nearby lake from Lake Calhoun to Bde Maka Ska, as well as the murder of George Floyd. On October 21, 2020, the owners announced that the building would now be known as Seven Points, stating “A property named for a known racist and champion of slavery has no place in Minneapolis or anywhere in our society.” The new name refers to the pointed sign atop the roof of the building. Ownership also set forth a conceptual vision for the building that includes an outdoor plaza addition, a market store, and “flexible mixed-use space” that includes retail, office and residential components.
