= Experimental College of the Twin Cities =

The Experimental College of the Twin Cities (EXCOtc) was an experimental college in the Minneapolis-Saint Paul area that provided free, non-credit education courses. It was started by Macalester students in the spring of 2006 in response to a policy change that reflected the shrinking access to higher education nationally and the neo-liberal model in the US and around the world.

== See also ==
- Experimental college movement
- Experimental College at Tufts University
