= Pharmacies in the United States =

There are approximately 88,000 pharmacies in the United States. Over half (about 48,000) are located within drug stores, grocery stores, hospitals, department stores, medical clinics, surgery clinics, universities, nursing homes, prisons, and other facilities. The remaining pharmacies are considered to be independent or privately owned. The top 25 pharmacy chain stores represent about 38,000 pharmacy locations in the U.S. and employ about 149,000 on-staff pharmacists. California has 8,015 pharmacies, the most of any state. Texas, Florida, New York, and Pennsylvania round out the top five states for pharmacy locations. Nationwide, the number of community pharmacies increased by 6.3% between 2007-2015, and the number of pharmacies per 10,000 people (2.11) did not change. However, the number of pharmacies per-capita varies substantially across counties, ranging from 0 to 13.6 per- 10,000 people in 2015.

== Patient care services ==
=== Access ===
Community pharmacies offer basic preliminary health assessments in addition to dispensing prescriptions. The community pharmacist is considered to be the most accessible healthcare professional to the general public, as they are available to anyone on a walk-in basis. Approximately 9 out of 10 Americans live within 5 miles of a community pharmacy.

=== Dispensing prescriptions ===
The primary role of pharmacies in the US is to safely and accurately fill prescriptions ordered by healthcare providers for patients. The pharmacy may receive a prescription in many ways, including a hardcopy, verbally over the phone, or electronically from the provider's electronic medical record system (EMR) is linked to the pharmacy. Upon receival, the pharmacy staff first verify or update the patient's profile in the pharmacy computer system. The profile includes the patient's name, date of birth, address, phone number, insurance, allergies, conditions, etc., all factors that help ensure the correct patient receives the correct and appropriate medication in a safe manner. The prescription details typically consisting of the medication name, dosage form, instructions, quantity, day supply, refills, etc. are entered into the computer. The pharmacist checks to ensure the prescription has been entered accurately, any interactions between other medication therapies or conditions, and appropriateness of the therapy for the patient. Depending on the pharmacy's computer system, the claim is either submitted for payment to the insurance, discount card, or filled for the cash price either after the prescription is entered or after the pharmacist checks the order. The prescription is then filled and completed prescription is then checked again by the pharmacist.

=== Drug utilization review ===
Part of the dispensing process includes managing a patient's therapy, including prescription drugs and over the counter (OTC) medications and assessing their appropriateness of the therapy for the patient - this is also referred to as drug utilization review (DUR). The DUR process is completed by the pharmacist. The process reviews a patient's drug order in a systemic and comprehensive review against predetermined criteria and compared against a patient's or a population's data records. The DUR process often utilizes computerized algorithms to perform key checks with known data, and the results of the algorithms are reviewed by the pharmacist. Common issues analyzed are appropriate prescription medications dosage, drug interactions, duplications or contraindications with the patient's disease state or condition. Evaluation or interactions are often classified in the following categories:

- Clinical abuse/misuse
- Drug-disease contraindications (when a prescribed drug should not be used with certain diseases)
- Drug-dosage modification
- Drug-drug interactions (when two or more different drugs interact and alter their intended effects and may cause adverse effects)
- Drug-patient precautions (gender, age, allergies, pregnancy, etc.)
- Formulary considerations or substitutions (e.g., therapeutic interchange, generic substitution, cost)

DUR can be performed in prospective, concurrently, or retrospectively. Prospective DUR review is when a patient's planned drug therapy is evaluated before a medication is dispensed. Concurrent review is performed during the course of treatment with ongoing drug therapy. A retrospective DUR reviews drug therapy after the drug therapy is completed. The retrospective review helps detect patterns in prescribing, dispensing or administering drugs, or following with any post-therapy issues.

DUR is helpful for all areas of healthcare by providing feedback on therapy performance and outcomes. Therapy reviews highlight prescribing behaviors compared to pre-set criteria or treatment protocols.

=== Immunizations ===
In the United States, all 50 states permit community pharmacists to administer immunization services, but regulations such as minimum patient age, types of vaccinations/immunizations, record-keeping, etc. differ from state to state. In some states, such as Rhode Island and Idaho, certified pharmacy technicians with the necessary training may also provide immunizations. Pharmacists often require specific training and certification to legally be able to immunize in addition to their basic licensure. This generally includes annual or routine continuing education on eligibility criteria for specific immunizations, administration techniques, and cardiopulmonary resuscitation (CPR) or basic life support (BLS). Community pharmacies contribute significantly to immunization rates as they offer expanded business hours, convenient locations, and lower costs compared to other healthcare providers. Vaccinations may be given in community pharmacies either by a non-patient specific standing order or protocol from a licensed prescriber or a patient-specific prescription. A standing order or protocol is frequently used by pharmacies as they permit assessment and vaccination of a patient without a clinician's examination or direct order from the clinician. They prespecify the conditions in which a vaccine may be given: which populations may receive the vaccine, eligibility of patient, administration procedure, etc. Most vaccinations provided by community pharmacies are given under standing order protocols, including flu vaccinations. It is the pharmacist's responsibility to screen patients to assess if a patient needs or should receive a particular vaccination when immunizing in a community pharmacy.

== Pharmacy chains ==
The table below shows the top pharmacy chains in the United States ranked by total number of pharmacies that accept Affordable Care Act Health Insurance Plans, according to the NPPES via summary report by Pharmacy Near Me pharmacy locator

Data compiled from public pharmacy datasets. "Accept ACA" indicates pharmacies accepting ACA health plans based on machine-readable insurer data..
Rank	Pharmacy chain	Headquarters	Accept ACA	NPPES	Pharmacists
1	Walgreens	Deerfield, Illinois	9406	11089	49243
2	CVS	Woonsocket, Rhode Island	9013	9234	32016
3	Walmart	Bentonville, Arkansas	4641	4843	13583
4	Kroger	Cincinnati	1854	2070	6223
5	Publix	Lakeland, Florida	1387	1415	3750
6	Safeway	Pleasanton, California	762	1176	4033
7	Costco	Issaquah, Washington	633	657	2098
8	Kaiser	Oakland, California	456	597	1089
9	Jewel-Osco	Chicago	386	441	1423
10	Albertsons	Boise, Idaho	380	637	1292
11	HEB	San Antonio, Texas	326	348	1130
12	Hy-Vee	West Des Moines, Iowa	294	311	949
13	Meijer	Grand Rapids, Michigan	273	283	775
14	Sav-On	Batesville, Arkansas	228	324	740
15	Giant Eagle	Pittsburgh	223	253	646
16	ShopRite	Keasbey, New Jersey	199	217	339
17	Hannaford	Scarborough, Maine	147	166	477
18	Giant Food	Carlisle, Pennsylvania	134	134	300
19	Omnicare	Cincinnati	115	121	200
20	Wegmans	Rochester, New York	99	103	426
21	Kinney Drugs	Syracuse, New York	96	98	366
22	PharMerica	Louisville, Kentucky	93	109	213
23	Stop & Shop	Quincy, Massachusetts	91	92	240
24	Cardinal Health	Dublin, Ohio	35	67	29
25	Food Lion	Salisbury, North Carolina	34	39	47
