= Daunte Wright protests =

Series of demonstrations and riots in response to a police shooting in April 2021

- Part of 2020–2023 Minneapolis–Saint Paul racial unrest
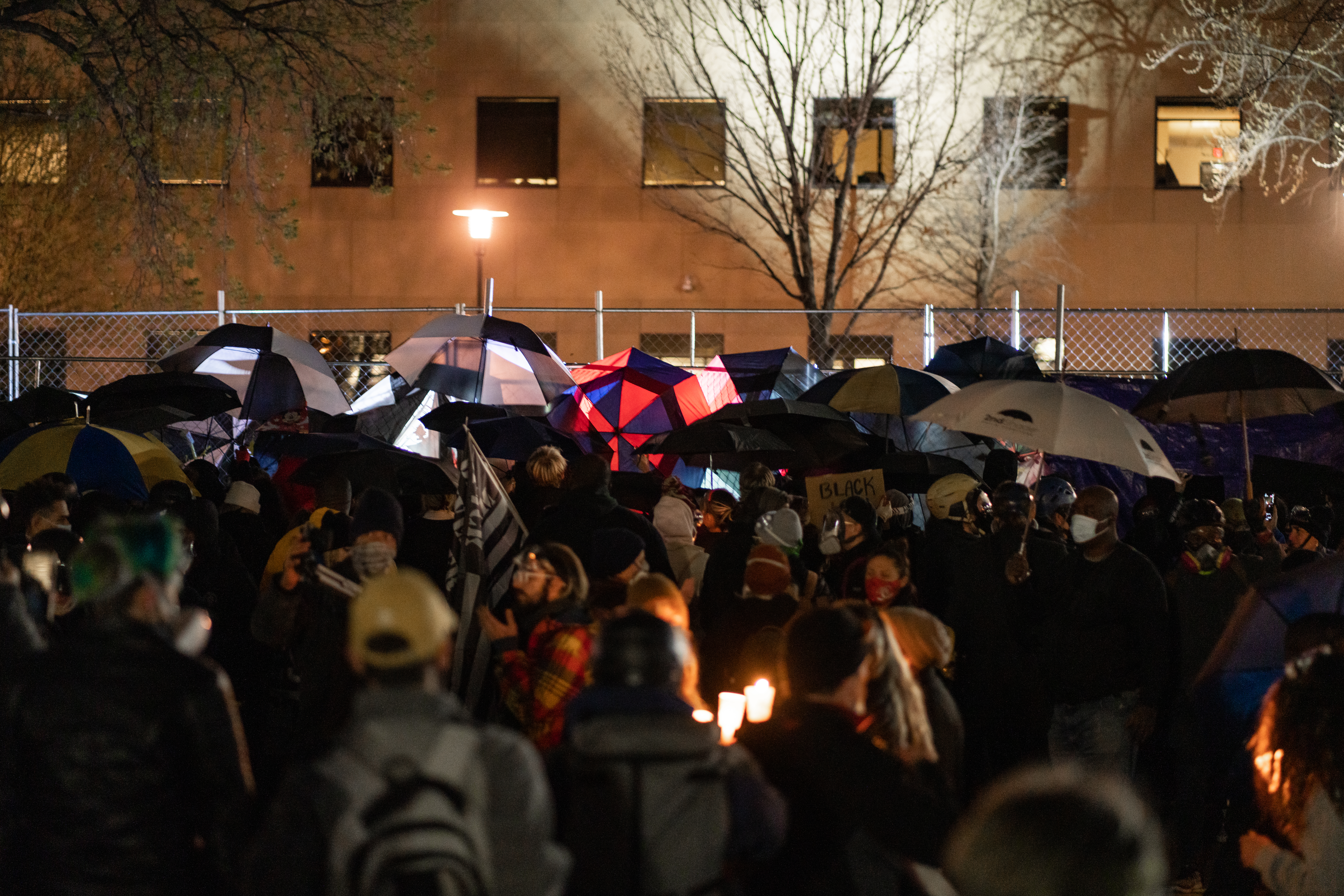
- Protest outside the Brooklyn Center police headquarters, April 15, 2021
- Date: Initial unrest: April 11–20, 2021 (9 days); Subsequent events: April 21 – December 23, 2021 (8 months and 2 days); Sentencing unrest: February 18, 2022
- Location: Brooklyn Center, Minnesota, United States
- Caused by: Killing of Daunte Wright
- Goals: Independent investigation; Murder charges for Kim Potter; Removal of police chief and city manager; Police reform; End to qualified immunity for police officers; Defunding or abolition of police
- Methods: Protests, demonstrations, civil disobedience, civil resistance, looting, riots, arson, protest art
- Result: Potter convicted of first-degree manslaughter on December 23, 2021

Aftermath
- Arrested: 301+in April 2021; 1 in December 2021
- Damage: 208 properties affected, including 4 set on fire
- Charged: 3

Protests and civil disorder occurred in reaction to the killing of Daunte Wright on April 11, 2021. Wright, a 20-year-old Black man, was fatally shot by police officer Kimberly Potter during a traffic stop in Brooklyn Center, Minnesota, United States. Protests that first began in Brooklyn Center spread to other locations in the Minneapolis–Saint Paul metropolitan area and then to other cities in the United States. Several nights of civil disorder in Brooklyn Center and adjacent cities resulted in sporadic looting and damage to several hundred properties, including four businesses that were set on fire.

Wright's death came during a prolonged period of unrest in the Minneapolis–Saint Paul metropolitan area over police brutality and racial injustice, notably due to the murder of George Floyd and the trial of Derek Chauvin, the Minneapolis police officer who murdered Floyd. Protesters demanded justice for Wright's death and made several demands of public officials, including a more severe murder charge for Potter, an independent investigation of the shooting, and enactment of police reform measures.

In mid-April 2021, many local protests were held outside the Brooklyn Center police station on Humboldt Avenue. Law enforcement established a heavily fortified barrier area and periodically clashed with demonstrators over several days. Demonstrators made several attempts to overrun the security barrier established around the police station during a few nights of tense protests. Law enforcement fired tear gas and less-lethal munitions into the crowds. Protesters later demanded that criminal charges be dropped against demonstrators over Wright's death, and that law enforcement discontinue aggressive crowd control methods. In three separate incidents, law enforcement and Minnesota National Guard troops had gunshots fired at them during civil disorder in the week after Wright's death.

Protests resumed in late 2021 during Potter's criminal trial with most demonstrations concentrated in downtown Minneapolis near a court building. A jury convicted Potter of first-degree and second-degree manslaughter charges on December 23, 2021. Protests were held as a reaction to Potter's prison sentence, which was for two years rather than the seven years requested by the state, and a few instances of looting took place in Brooklyn Center and Minneapolis.

== Background ==
=== Killing of Daunte Wright ===
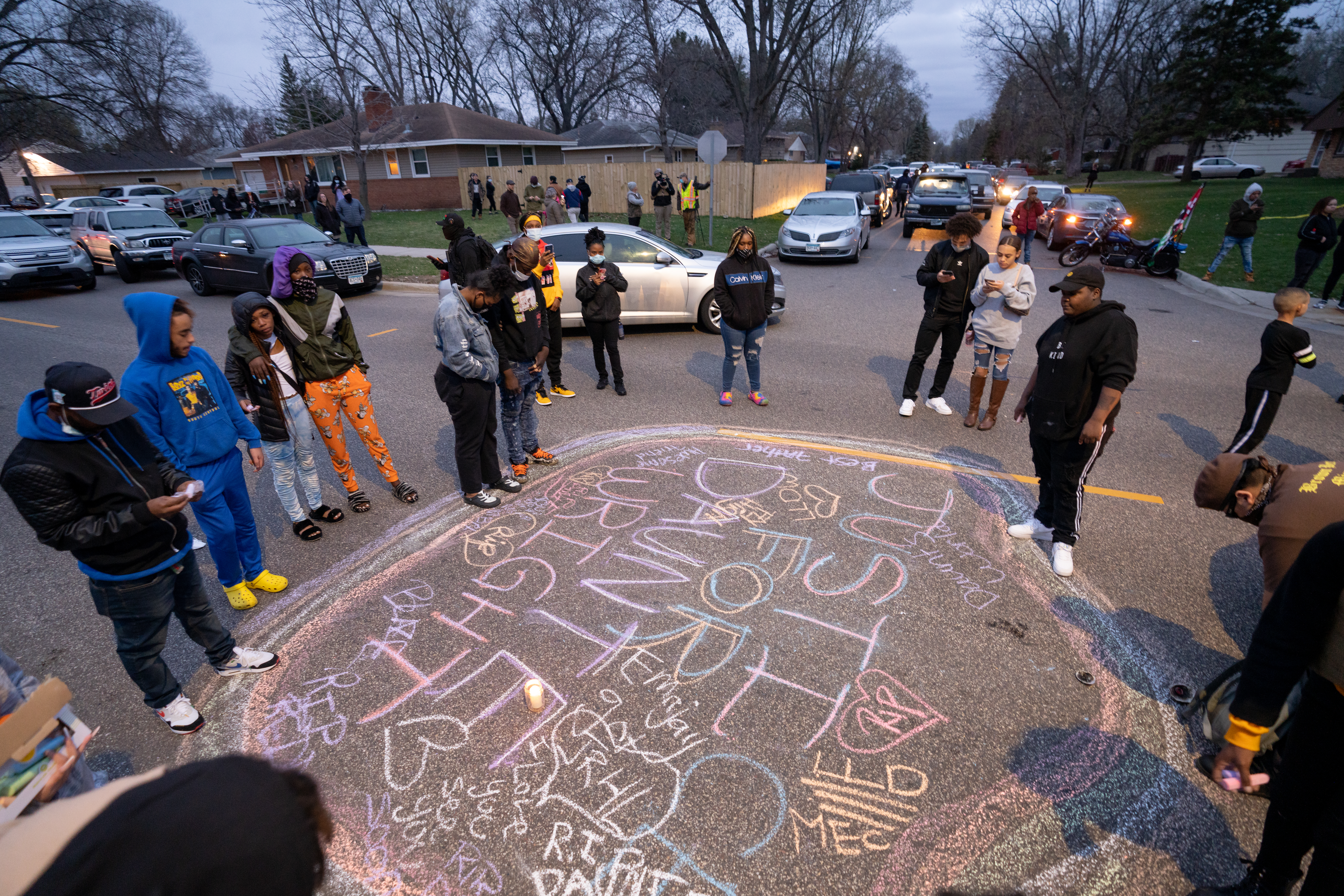
Vigil for Daunte Wright on April 11, 2021, near the location he died

Daunte Wright was an unarmed, 20-year-old biracial Black man, who was fatally shot by Brooklyn Center police officer Kimberly Potter during an altercation at a traffic stop on April 11, 2021, on 63 Avenue North in Brooklyn Center, Minnesota. Police said Potter had meant to use her Taser but accidentally used a handgun.

=== Brooklyn Center ===
Brooklyn Center is a city in the Minneapolis–Saint Paul metropolitan area, bordering Minneapolis to the north. It had a population of nearly 31,000 residents by 2021, and it had transformed from a mostly White suburb to one of the most diverse areas in the region over the previous decades with most of its residents people of color. The city was also one of the poorest in Hennepin County; 15 percent of residents lived below the federal poverty level. In 2019, voters elected Mike Elliot, a Liberian-American, to be the city's first person-of-color mayor. By the time of Wright's death, most of the city's police force were White, and no officers lived within the city's boundaries.

=== Previous law enforcement killings in Minnesota ===
Wright's killing was the sixth by Brooklyn Center police officers since 2012, and all but one were of persons of color. At least 207 people have been killed by law enforcement in Minnesota between 2000 and 2021, according to a local newspaper database. Wright's death became the third high-profile death of a Black man in the Minneapolis area over the preceding five years during a police encounter. In 2016, Philando Castile was shot to death by a police officer during a traffic stop in the nearby city of Falcon Heights, and Floyd was murdered in 2020. The fatal shooting of Justine Damond, a White woman, by a Black Minneapolis police officer in 2017 also resulted in controversy, and a conviction of third-degree murder and manslaughter for the officer that shot her. The fatal shooting of Jamar Clark by a Minneapolis police officer during an arrest in 2015, and the exchange of gunfire with Minneapolis police that left Dolal Idd dead during an attempted sting operation in December 2020, were also sources of controversy and protests over the killing of Black men.

=== Previous racial injustice protests and unrest ===
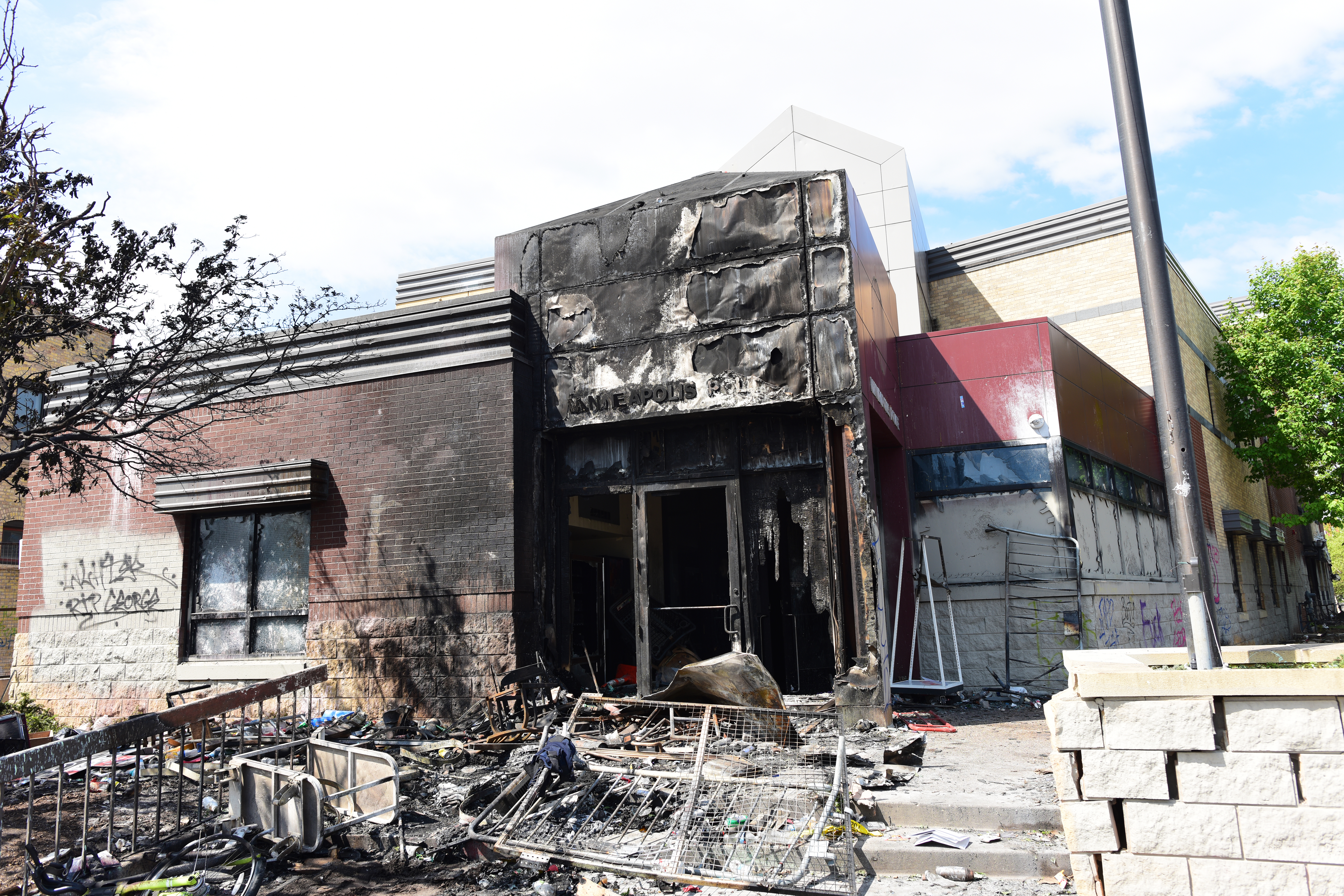
A destroyed police station in Minneapolis, May 30, 2020

In 2020 and 2021, the Minneapolis–Saint Paul metropolitan region experienced a prolonged period of protests and intermittent unrest over issues of police brutality and racial justice, beginning soon after the murder of George Floyd on May 25, 2020. Three nights of riots and looting from May 27 to May 30, 2020, resulted in two deaths, 617 arrests, and upwards of $500 million in property damage to 1,500 locations in the metropolitan region, making it the second-most destructive period of local unrest in United States history, after the 1992 Los Angeles riots. During the unrest, on May 28, 2020, a Minneapolis police station was overrun by demonstrators and set on fire.

Wright's death in Brooklyn Center was approximately ten miles (16 kilometers) from the 38th and Chicago Avenue street intersection in Minneapolis where George Floyd was murdered. Wright's death, and the subsequent protests, occurred as the trial of Derek Chauvin—the police officer who murdered Floyd—was nearing its conclusion in Minneapolis. According to The New York Times, the fatal shooting of Wright "injected more frustration and anxiety into the Twin Cities region", heightening local tension and outrage. By early April 2021, state officials had already begun mobilizing law enforcement and National Guard troops, in an effort referred to as "Operation Safety Net", in preparation for a verdict in the Chauvin trial. Officials hoped to avoid a repeat of the civil disorder, violence, and property destruction that the metropolitan region experienced in May and June 2020 after Floyd's murder.

== Events in Brooklyn Center and Minneapolis–Saint Paul ==
=== Initial protests and civil disorder ===
==== Day 1: Sunday, April 11, 2021 ====
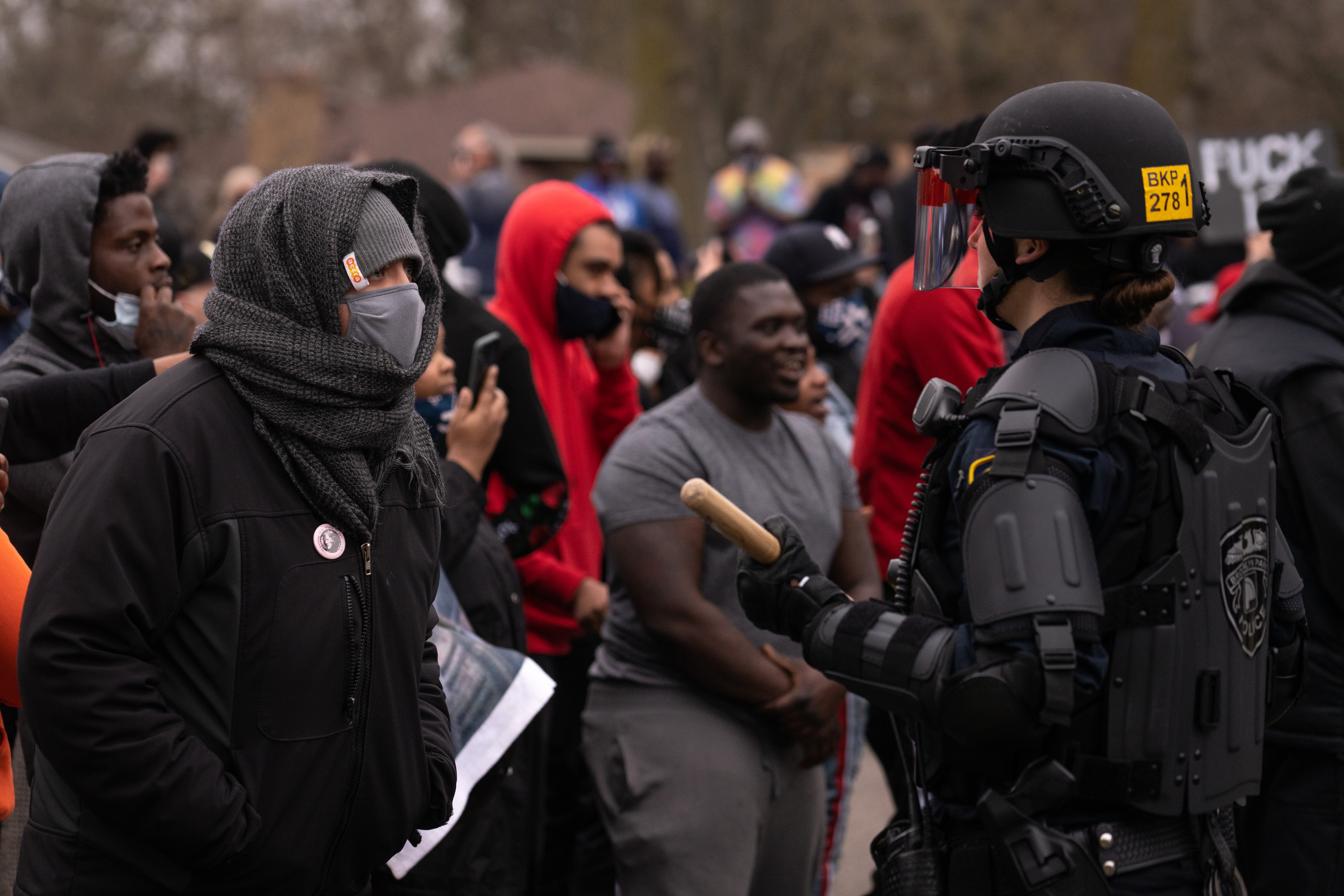
Protest in Brooklyn Center near the location where Wright was killed, April 11, 2021

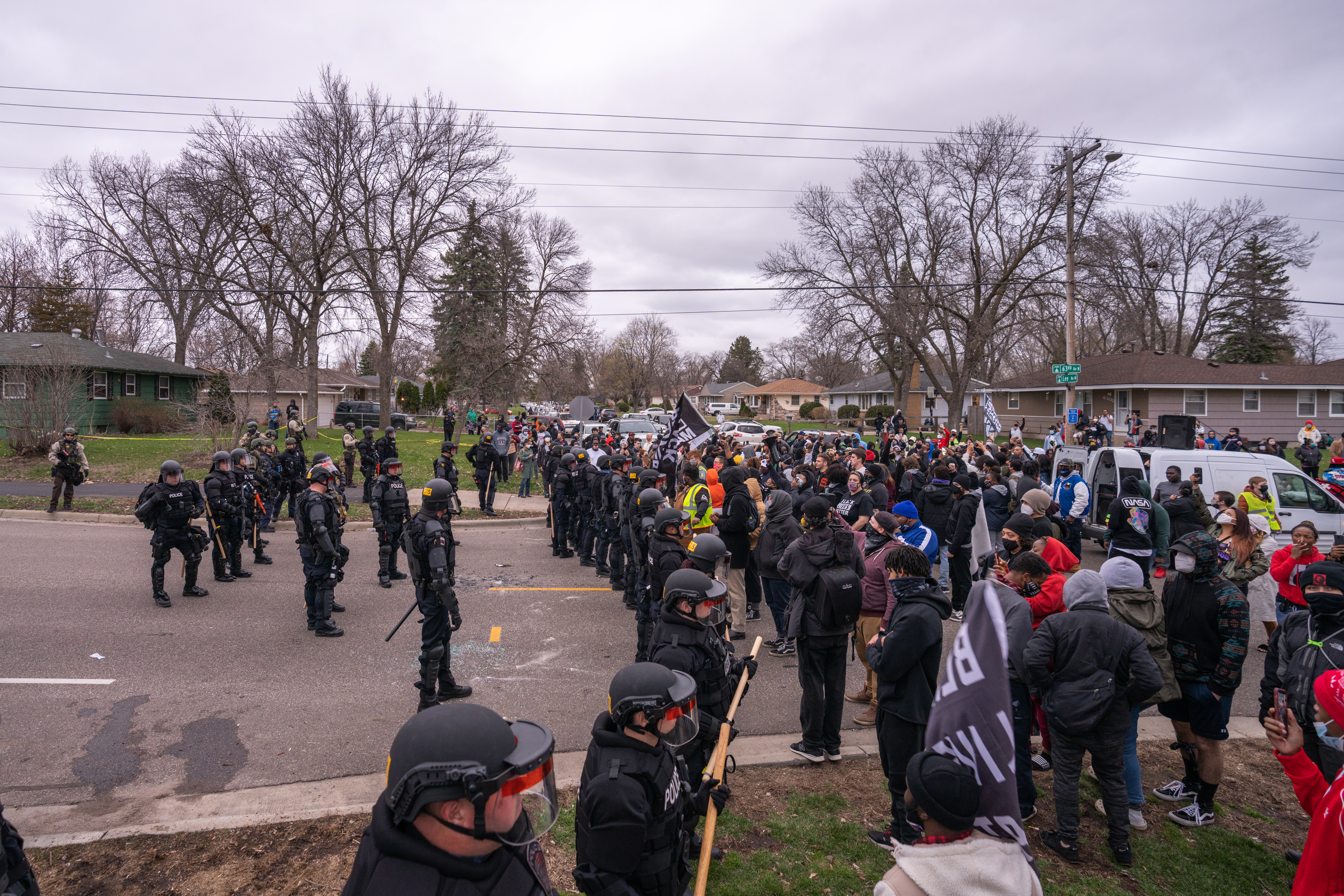
Line of police and protesters in Brooklyn Center, April 11, 2021

On April 11, 2021, at 1:48 p.m., officer Kimberly Potter with the police department of Brooklyn Center, a suburb of Minneapolis–Saint Paul, shot 20-year-old Daunte Wright, a black man, during a traffic stop. Wright had an outstanding warrant for his arrest. As officers attempted to detain him, a struggle ensued and Wright re-entered his vehicle. Potter discharged her firearm, believing she was using her taser gun instead, striking Wright before he drove off. Wright crashed his vehicle several blocks away. Though EMS arrived and attempted to revive him, Wright was pronounced dead at the scene of the crash. Wright's girlfriend was also a passenger in the car. She sustained non-life-threatening injuries from the crash and was transported to the hospital.

As news of the Brooklyn Center incident spread, family members of Wright, neighbors to the car crash, and protesters began gathering at the car crash scene in Brooklyn Center in what was initially a peaceful demonstration to demand justice for Wright. Several protesters came from another rally organized by families of people who had been killed by police, that they had held earlier in the day in nearby Saint Paul, Minnesota. The crowd grew to several hundred people by evening as they demanded more information from police investigators. As tension at the scene rose over the ensuing hours, police in tactical gear arrived, formed a line, and moved in when demonstrators began climbing on police vehicles and throwing bricks. Police fired tear gas into the crowd and a less-lethal round that struck a demonstrator in the head who appeared to be holding a chunk of concrete.

In nearby Saint Paul, four people were arrested during looting in the afternoon. Liquor stores, cell phone stores, and gas stations along University Avenue, Marshall Avenue, Payne Avenue, Arcade Street and Sherwood Avenue were looted.

At nightfall, demonstrators gathered outside the Brooklyn Center Police Department building on Humboldt Avenue and stood off against a line of police in riot gear. Authorities declared the gathering unlawful and gave orders for the crowd to disperse. When crowds did not disperse, police fired tear gas, flashbangs, and rubber bullets into the crowd, scattering demonstrators. According to John Harrington, commissioner of the Minnesota Department of Public Safety, there were reports of rocks and other objects being thrown and gunshots being fired in the area.

Violence and widespread looting occurred at many stores overnight in Brooklyn Center, in Minneapolis, and at other locations in the Twin Cities region. In Brooklyn Center, looting took place at the Shingle Creek Crossing shopping plaza, and affected nearly every store located there. Brooklyn Center Police reported that at its peak, there were 24 simultaneous looting incidents. In Brooklyn Park, an adjacent city to Brooklyn Center, a gunshot was fired into the glass door of a police station, though no one was injured. Late that night, Brooklyn Center Mayor Mike Elliott imposed an overnight curfew and the city announced closure of its schools for April 12. State officials began deployment of the Minnesota National Guard to Brooklyn Center and throughout the metropolitan area to provide non-police security.

About 25–30 people were arrested overnight in Minneapolis by law enforcement. Several Minneapolis businesses were looted on Sunday evening, many of which had been looted during the George Floyd protests in Minneapolis–Saint Paul in May 2020. Property damage was also reported in Saint Paul overnight.

==== Day 2: Monday, April 12, 2021 ====
Brooklyn Center police station, April 12, 2021

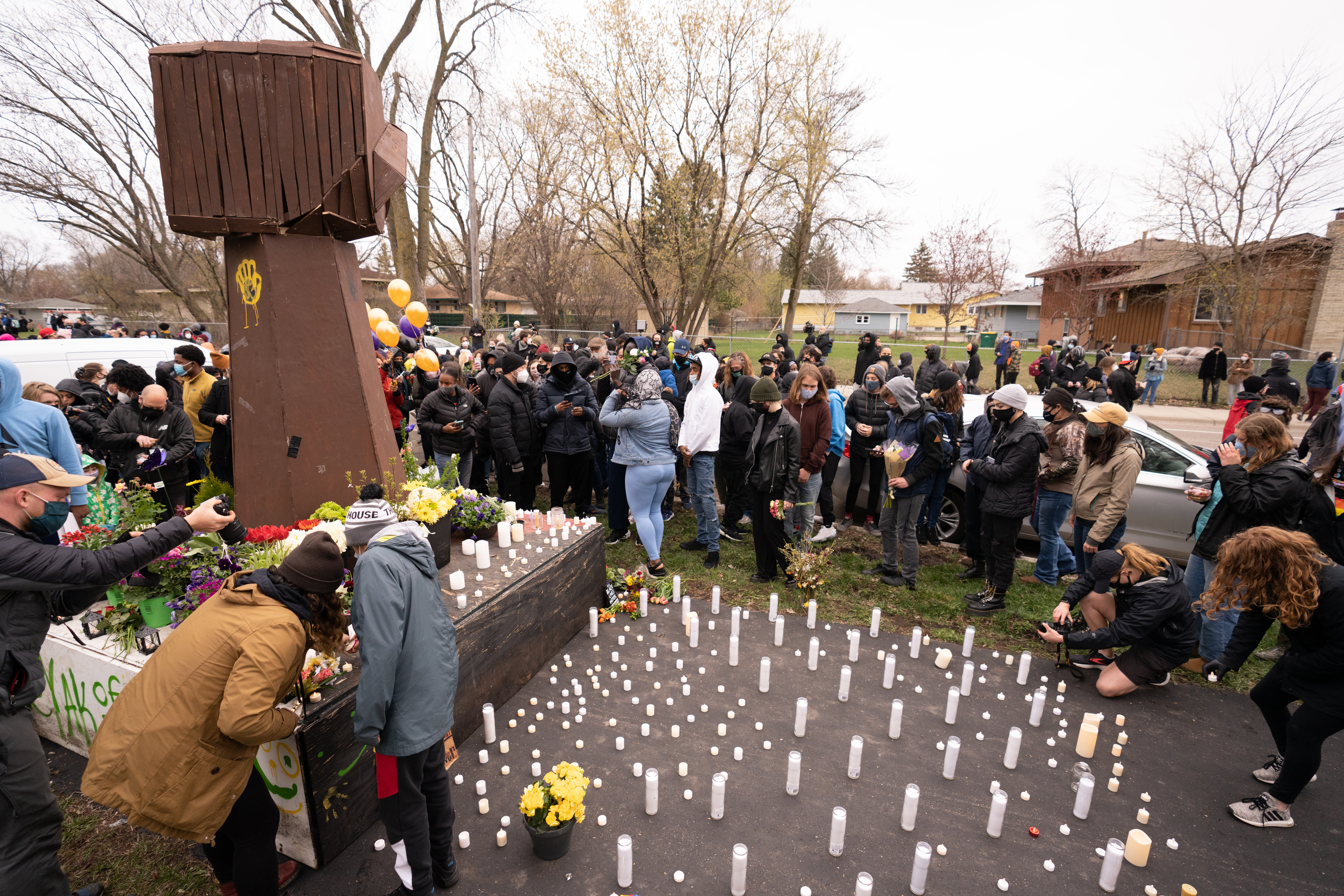
Memorial for Daunte Wright at the location he died, April 12, 2021

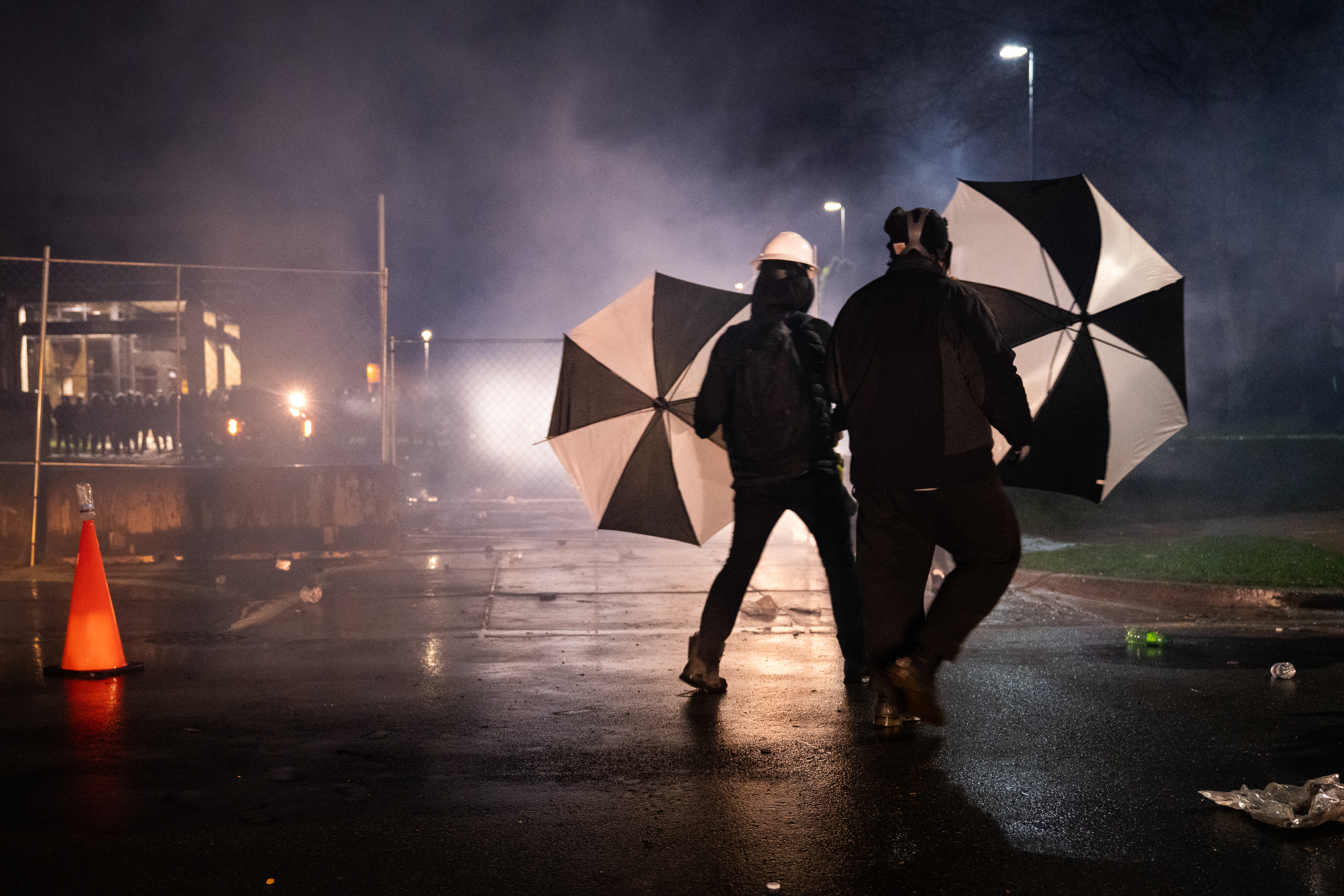
Demonstrators outside the Brooklyn Center police station at night, April 12, 2021

The overnight curfew was lifted at 6:00 a.m. on Monday, April 12, 2021. Students in Brooklyn Center were ordered to stay home on Monday for fears of further violence. The Hennepin County Medical Examiner report released that day ruled Daunte Wright's death a homicide, and officials identified Potter as the officer who shot Wright.

In anticipation of civil unrest following the shooting, Minnesota Governor Tim Walz implemented a curfew in the metropolitan counties Hennepin, Ramsey, Anoka, and Dakota from 7:00 p.m. on April 12, 2021, to 6:00 a.m. on April 13. Approximately 1,000 members of the Minnesota National Guard were deployed across the Twin Cities to provide a non-police security presence. Several Minnesota professional sports teams—Timberwolves, Twins, and Wild cancelled their scheduled home games for April 12. City officials in Brooklyn Center fired their longtime city manager, which had been a demand of protesters. Minneapolis Mayor Jacob Frey declared a state of emergency and a curfew effective from 7:00 p.m. on April 12 until 6:00 a.m. on April 13. Saint Paul Mayor Melvin Carter declared a state of emergency and a curfew on Monday.

By noon, 50 protesters were facing off with an equal number of National Guard personnel in Brooklyn Center. Authorities erected concrete barricades and chain-link fencing around the city's police station.

The Brooklyn Center City Council passed a resolution banning choke holds and use of dangerous crowd control tactics such as tear gas, pepper spray, rubber bullets, and protester kettling. Police, however, still used the tactics during the response. Brooklyn Center also officials released the body camera footage of Potter shooting Wright during a press conference. At one point during the day, Brooklyn Center Mayor Mike Elliot stood outside the police station alongside protesters and spoke to the gathered crowd about ensuring justice and accountability for the shooting of Wright.

In an afternoon press conference in Washington, D.C., President Joe Biden commented on the situation in Brooklyn Center during a meeting with members of congress about his economic agenda. Biden called for an investigation into the killing and said "our prayers are with the family" of Daunte Wright. He added about the unrest, "But, in the meantime, I want to make it clear again: There is absolutely no justification—none—for looting, no justification for violence. Peaceful protest, understandable."

For a second night in a row, a large protest gathered after curfew at the Brooklyn Center police headquarters. The 7 p.m. curfew was ignored by crowds of hundreds, leading to clashes between rioter and police with arrests starting around 9:00 p.m. Some demonstrators threw bottles and bricks and shot fireworks at police officers and National Guard troops. Police deployed gas canisters and flash-bang grenades to disperse the crowd. By 10 p.m. the police had cleared the area around the police station.

Sporadic looting was reported at several Brooklyn Center businesses throughout the night. Fire department crews responded to smoke coming from a Dollar Tree stored that had been looted and set on fire. By 12:30 a.m. on April 13, 40 people had been arrested in Brooklyn Center, according to a report state law enforcement released the next day, and several police officers reported minor injuries from objects thrown at officers.

==== Day 3: Tuesday, April 13, 2021 ====
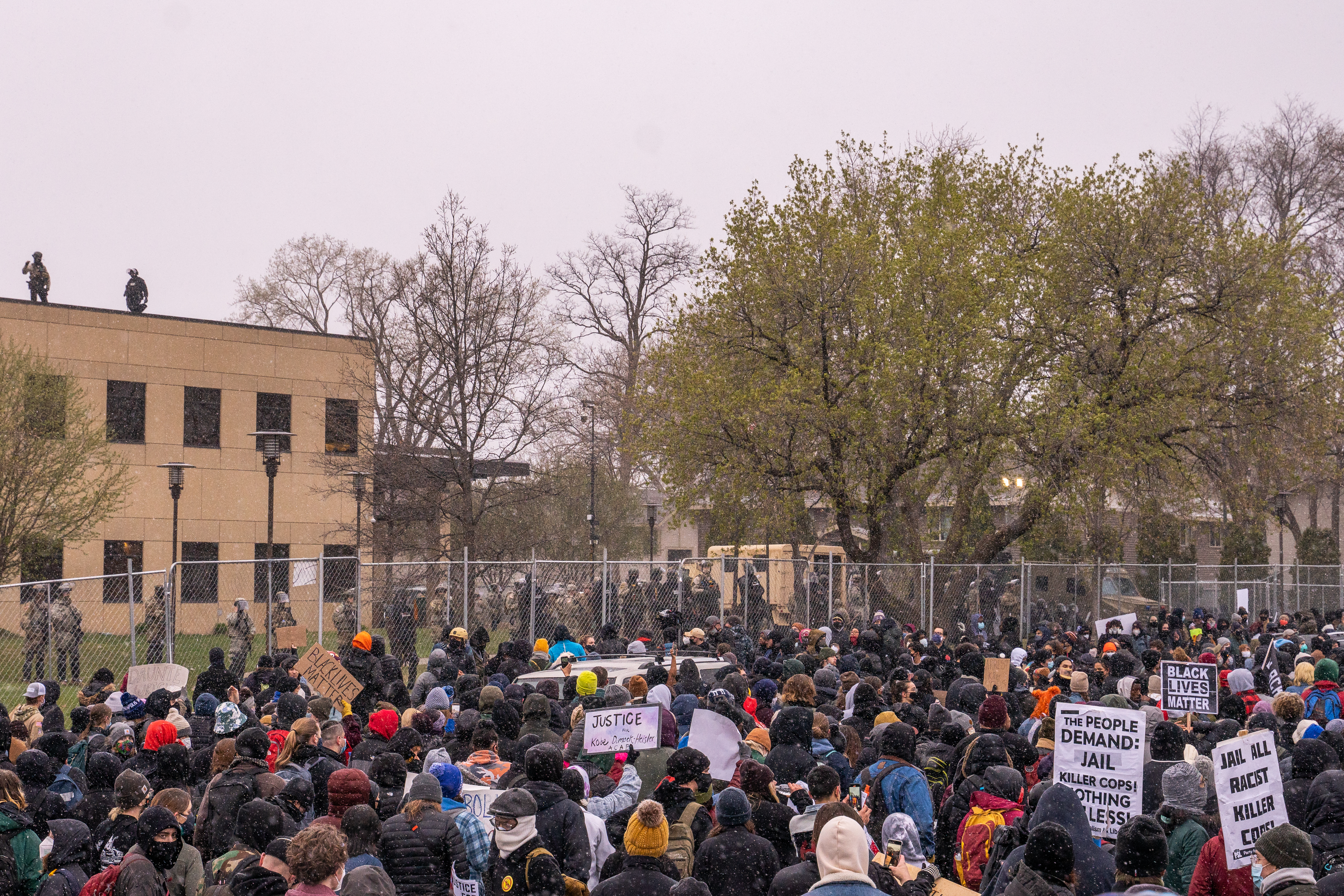
Protests in Brooklyn Center on April 13, 2021, outside the police station

On Tuesday, April 13, 2021, the Brooklyn Center city council voted to transfer oversight of the police department from the city manager to the mayor's office, and they dismissed their city manager. Potter fled her home after her address was posted to social media. Local police fortified Potter's home with fencing and concrete barriers. Potter resigned her position with the police department, which was effective immediately.

Several hundred protesters marched from the Brooklyn Center Police station to a nearby FBI satellite office. Things were peaceful until sundown when police declared an unlawful assembly and shot pepper spray and flash bombs at protesters. A curfew went into effect at 10 p.m. Some demonstrators threw projectiles at police and scaled the fence at the FBI office. Elsewhere in Brooklyn Center, several dumpsters and a vehicle outside an apartment building near 70th Street and Humbolt Avenue were set on fire. During the unrest, a person was recorded telling police officers to slash the tires of protesters "so they can't drive away" as police were ordering protesters out of a car.

At about 10:30 p.m., an occupied Saint Paul police vehicle that was monitoring retail areas for potential looting was hit by multiple gunshots fired by Jamoni Raekwon Blackstone, a 28-year-old man from North Saint Paul, who was angry with police over Wright's death. The police officer, who feared he was being ambushed, drove off to escape. Blackstone was later arrested. In late 2021, he pleaded guilty to second-degree intentional murder charges and received a 15-year sentence.

At around midnight, Brooklyn Center Mayor Mike Elliot said in a television interview, “We want people to go home. People are still upset, and the goal right now is to try and disperse the crowd and trying to get people to go home.”

Officials from Operation Safety Net said 79 people were arrested on April 13 and into the early morning hours of April 14.

==== Day 4: Wednesday, April 14, 2021 ====
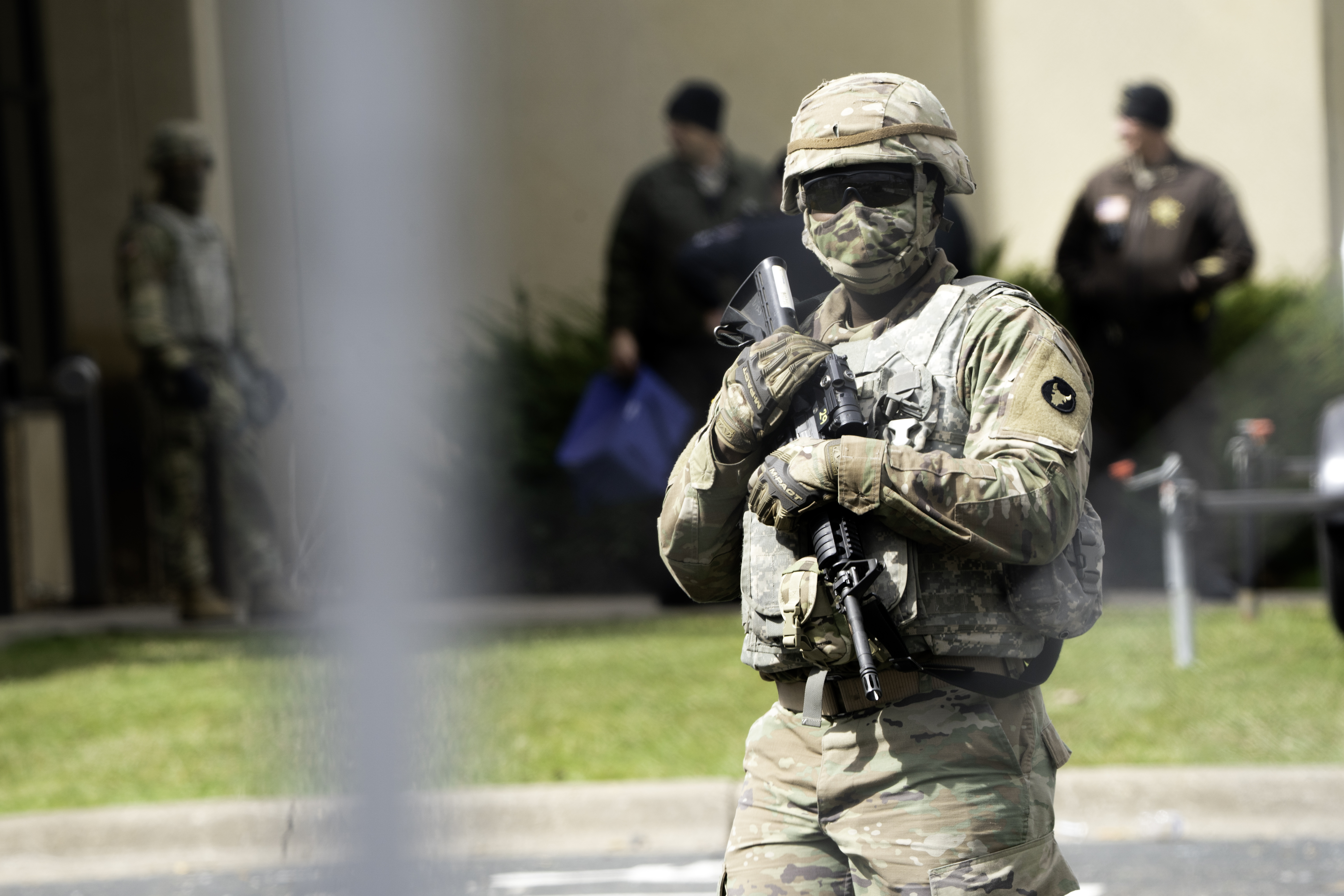
Police and Minnesota National Guard troops at the Brooklyn Center police station on April 14, 2021

Potter was arrested on April 14, 2021, and charged with second-degree manslaughter. She was taken into custody, but released several hours later after posting the $100,000 bail bond. Protesters that day demanded that more serious chargers were brought against her. According to Minnesota Department of Public Safety Commissioner John Harrington, many of the activists groups planning to continue protesting did not want participants to create trouble.

Protesters put up a large, wooden sculpture of a raised fist at the location where Wright died. The sculptured had been displayed previously at George Floyd Square in Minneapolis, but was replaced there by a version made of metal.

Hundreds of protesters gathered for the fourth night in a row outside the Brooklyn Center police department building. Most of the crowd was described as peaceful, but some who gathered threw objects at the National Guard members, State Patrol officers, and Hennepin County sheriff's deputies outside the police building. Authorities declared the gathering unlawful and issued dispersal orders before the 10 p.m. curfew went into effect. The situation grew more tense after the curfew time passed and authorities gave several additional dispersal orders. Law enforcement fired marking paint and pepper spray as it grew more unruly.

Twenty-four people were arrested. No looting was reported, according to authorities.

==== Day 5: Thursday, April 15, 2021 ====
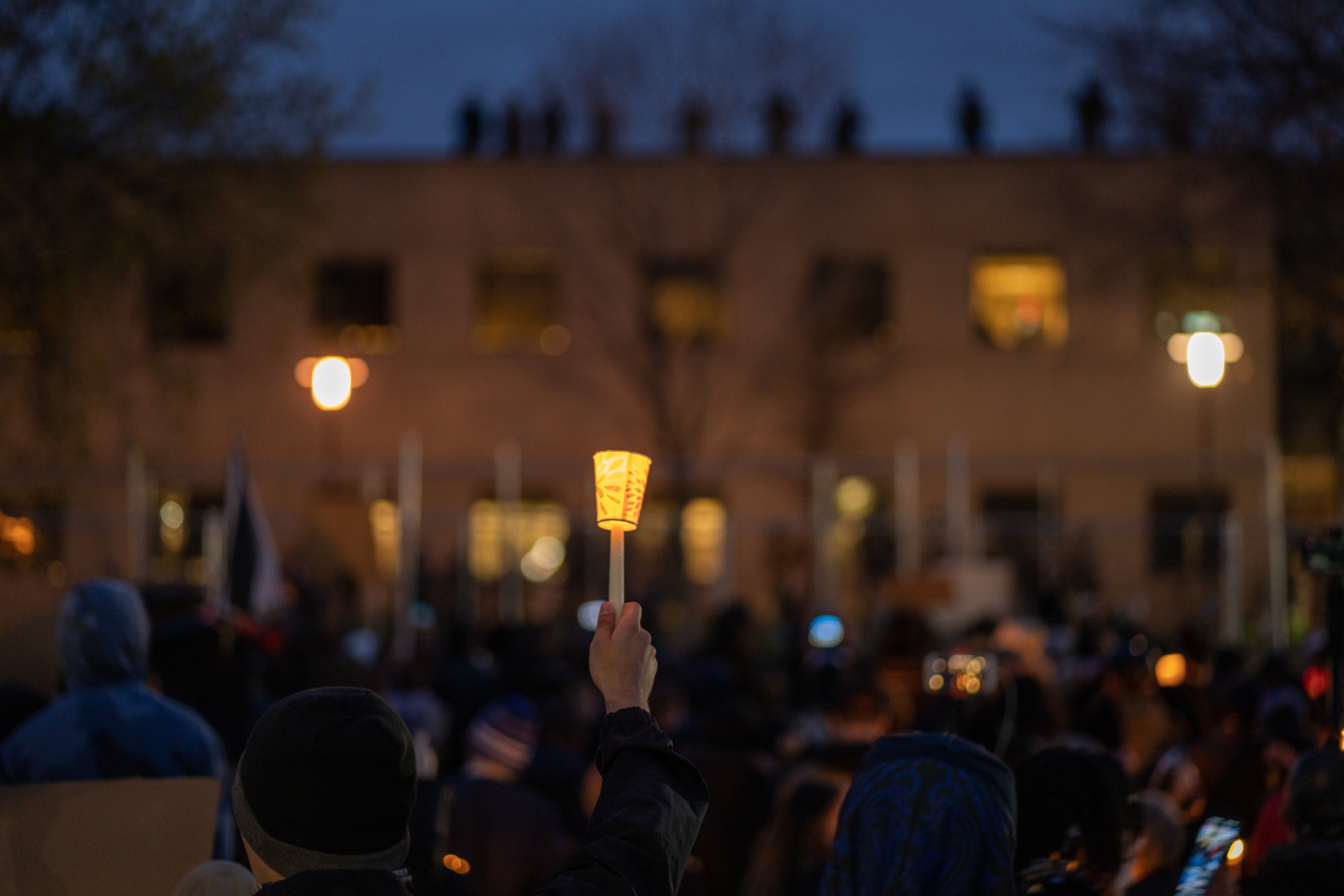
A candlelight vigil for Wright held outside the police station on April 15, 2021

Potter made her first court appearance in Hennepin County via teleconference on April 15, 2021. Wright's family called for more serious criminal charges to be filed against her.

Approximately 1,000 people gathered outside the Brooklyn Center police headquarters during the day in a peaceful rally that had a festival atmosphere and free food provided by a local non-profit organization. The cities of Brooklyn Park and Champlin declared overnight curfews beginning at 10 p.m.

By night, a small portion of the large crowd from earlier remained outside the Brooklyn Center police station. The scene grew more tense when a demonstrator attempted to break down fencing around the police station and some demonstrators threw objects at officers. In contrast to previous nights, law enforcement officers positioned themselves further back from the fencing and adopted a subdued response. No dispersal orders were issued to the crowd and authorities did not fire tear gas or less-lethal munitions.

==== Day 6: Friday, April 16, 2021 ====
In the morning on Friday, April 16, 2021, Margarita Ortega, a police abolition advocate and candidate for a Minneapolis City Council seat, commented on the property destruction during the unrest that disproportionately affected poorer areas in the city. In a message posted to the Facebook website that was directed to those setting buildings on fire, she said "Lake of the Isles has more then [sic] needed and won't be missed”.

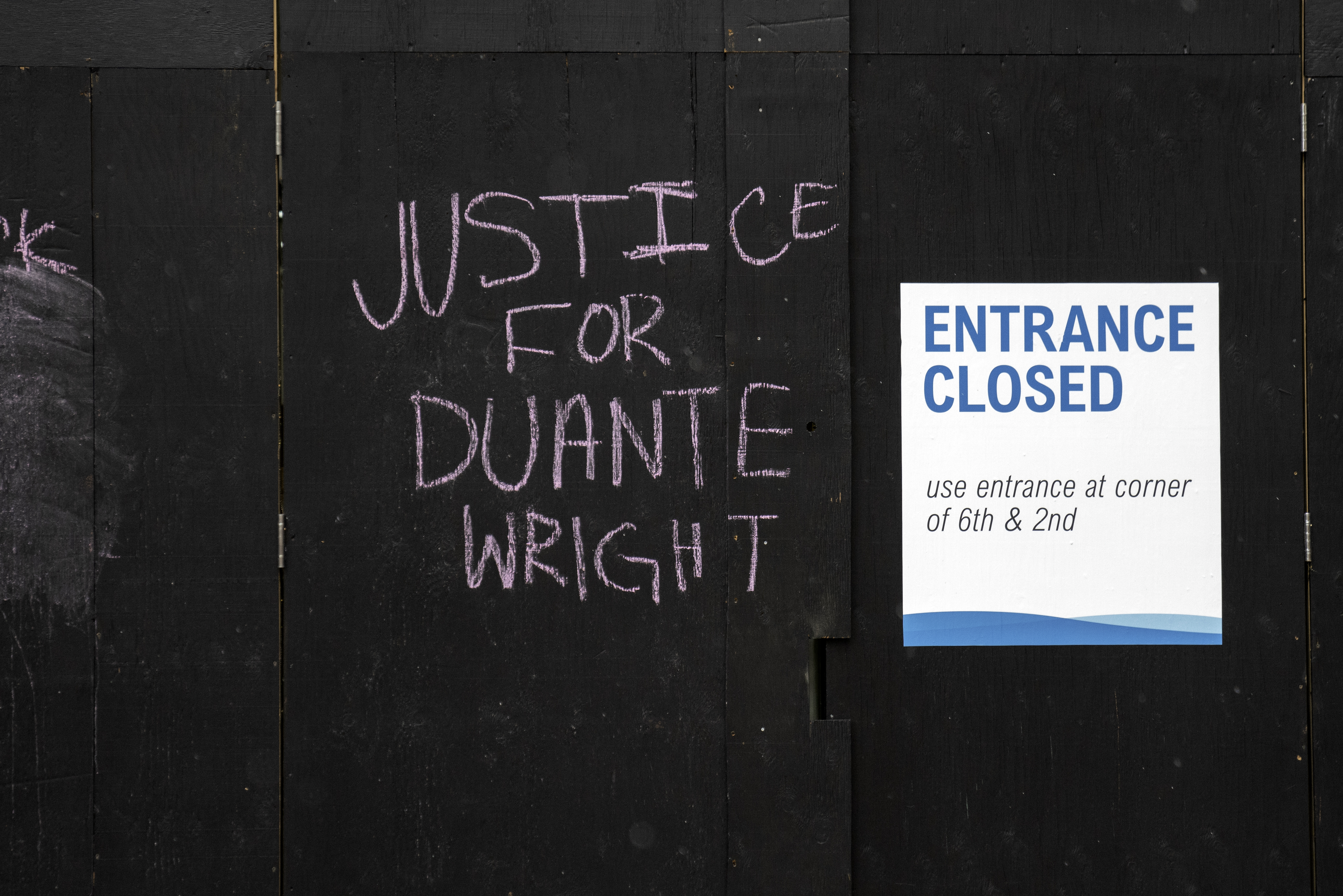
Graffiti on a boarded-up building in Minneapolis, April 16, 2021

During the day, members of the Minneapolis Regional Labor Federation held a press conference outside Brooklyn Center High School to "stand up for what's right...beyond just contracts". At least 50 members of the Minnesota National Guard were asked to leave the Saint Paul Labor Center by members of the Communications Workers of America Minneapolis Local 7250, which prompted criticism from some state legislators and Minnesota Governor Tim Walz.

In a press conference, Brooklyn Center Mayor Mike Elliot publicly disagreed with the police department's counter-protest measure tactics, such as firing pepper stray, tear gas, and paintballs at demonstrators. He said that “gassing is not a human way of policing.”

That evening, U.S. District Judge Wilhelmina Wright issued a two-week-long restraining order saying that police could not arrest journalists covering the protests, use force or chemical agents against them, or seize their camera equipment or press passes.

Brooklyn Center officials declined to issue a curfew for Friday night. A crowd that reached a size of approximately 1,000 people again gathered outside the fenced-off Brooklyn Center police headquarters in a festival-like atmosphere. The situation changed after 9 p.m. when a crowd of approximately 200 people remained gathered outside the fences. In a speech to the crowd, former professional basketball player Royce White said, "The fence represents tyranny. The fence is a smack in the face. The fence is spitting on Daunte Wright's face.... We have the numbers. We should continue to push."

Several demonstrators threw objects at law enforcement and advanced on the fences while other protesters pleaded with them to stop. A line of protesters shielded themselves with umbrellas. Some demonstrators that attempted to breach the fencing were armed with baseball bats, hockey equipment, and objects they used as projectiles. Law enforcement authorities announced a declaration that the assembly was unlawful at about 9:55 p.m.. They later deployed flash-bangs and then advanced on the crowd at approximately 10:05 p.m. At 10:40 p.m., Brooklyn Center officials issued a curfew for 11 p.m.

Law enforcement ushered journalists through checkpoints to verify credentials before releasing them. One photojournalist alleged he was punched and pepper-sprayed by a law enforcement officer. Despite the restraining order issued by the federal judge barring the use of force against journalists covering protests, Minnesota police forced journalists to lie flat on the ground while they were covering the protest, and photographed them and their press passes. The president of the USA Today network "condemned the actions" of the police and characterized them as "purposeful intimidation tactics". That night, police arrested 136 people, 52 people were arrested and booked for probable cause riot charges.

Law enforcement officials remarked that the rally had been peaceful until the last few minutes of it, and expressed disappointment that their strategy to deescalate was unsuccessful Friday, when Thursday had been relatively calm. Minnesota's public safety commissioner, John Harrington, said about the law enforcement response at a press conference just after midnight, "Tearing down a fence, coming armed to a protest, is not in my mind befitting a peaceful protest. It is not befitting groups that are there to recognize the tragedy that is the loss of Daunte Wright.”

==== Day 7: Saturday, April 17, 2021 ====
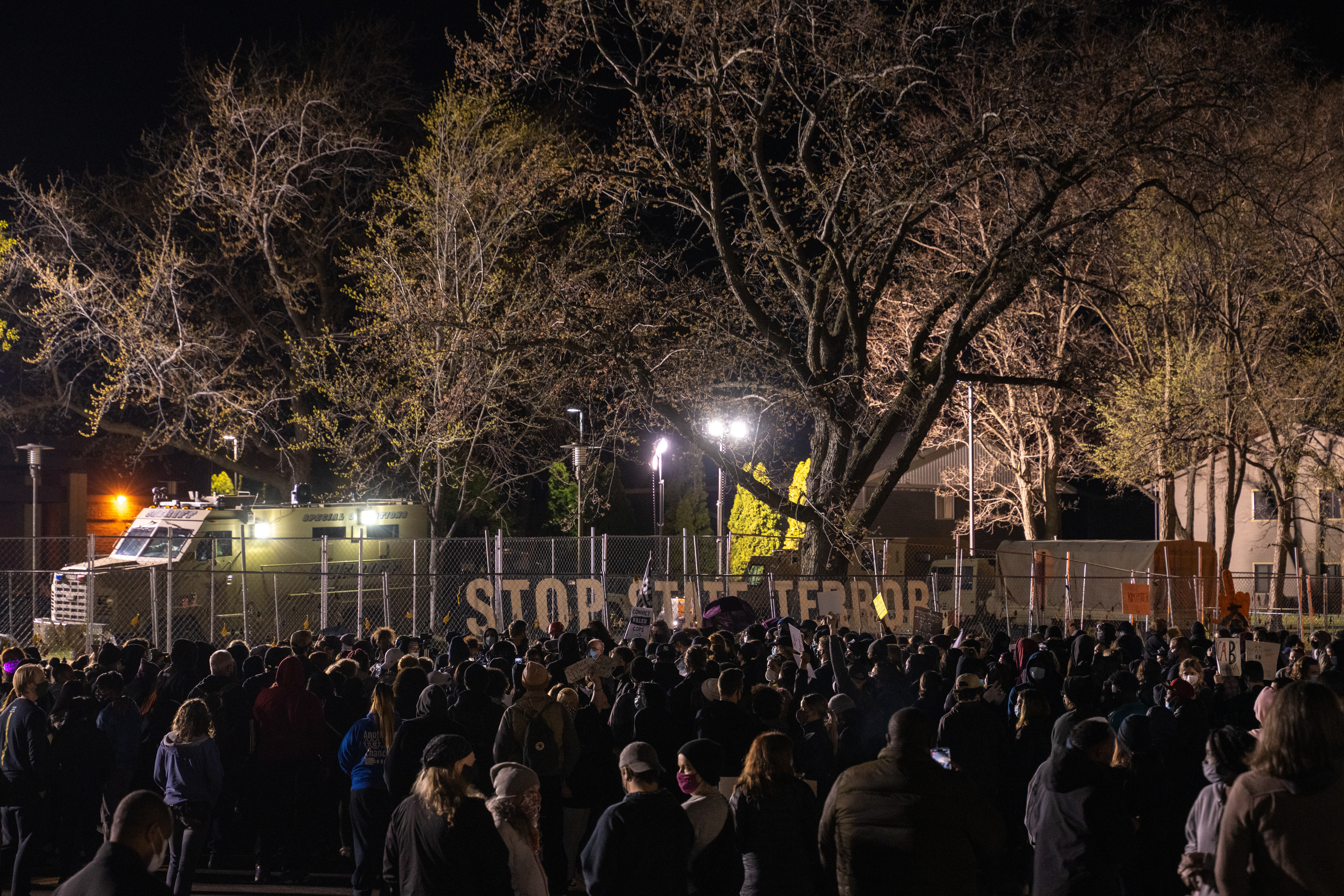
Protests in Brooklyn Center, April 17, 2021

Brooklyn Center and Champlin issued an 11 p.m. curfew for Saturday, April 17, 2021, ahead of planned protests for the day. Brooklyn Center Mayor Mike Elliot called for law enforcement to use more restraint by not firing munitions or tear gas into the crowd and by not kettling those who protest peacefully. Twenty-five media organizations sent a letter to Minnesota Governor Tim Walz denouncing law enforcement tactics perceived as intimidation and violence towards media members. Walz and state officials met with media members on April 14, and pledged to abide by the federal judge's order regarding journalists.

A protest group gathered in Saint Paul to demand that Potter, the officer who shot Wright, be charged with a more serious crime. After learning of the charging official's residential address, the protest group formed a caravan and travelled to Stillwater, Minnesota, in the afternoon. An approximately 100-person rally led by local activist Nekima Levy Armstrong took place outside the home of Washington County Attorney Pete Orput, the official who brought manslaughter charges against Potter. Protesters also marched the streets of the neighborhood. Orput spoke with the group at one point during the protest rally to explain his rationale for the charging decision, but protesters said they would continue to pressure Orput on the matter.

Hundreds of people gathered outside the Brooklyn Center police headquarters, for the seventh consecutive night of protests. The crowd reached 300 people at its largest point. Minnesota Freedom Fighters, a group of volunteers that sought to keep demonstrations peaceful, removed a group of people from the crowd that attempted to cut the fences that surrounded the police station. Jesse Jackson, a national civil rights leader, attended part of the rally. Protesters affixed a large sign to the protective fencing around the building that read, "Stop state terror".

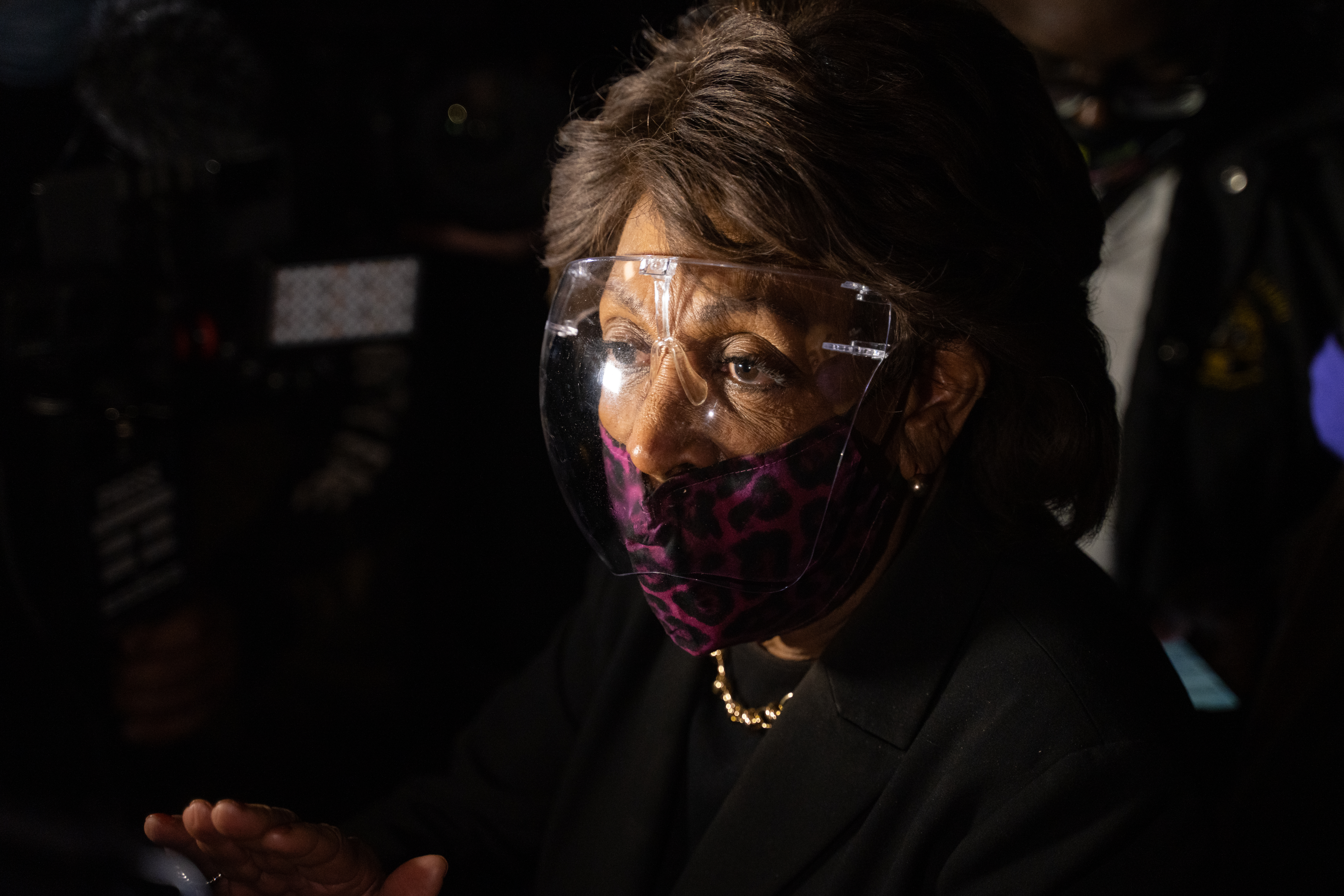
U.S. representative Maxine Waters attended the protest on April 17, 2021, and spoke to protesters outside the police station, encouraging them to "stay on the street" and "get more confrontational."

Later that night, U.S. Representative Maxine Waters of California attended the rally outside the police station, which by then had an estimated crowd of about 150 people. In an exchange with news reporters who were at the rally, Waters commented on the protests and the looming verdict in the trial of former Minneapolis police officer Derek Chauvin. She said, "I hope we get a verdict that says guilty, guilty, guilty. And if we don't, we cannot go away. We've got to stay on the street. We get more active, we've got to get more confrontational. We've got to make sure that they know that we mean business."

In response to a question from a report about the curfew in effect in Brooklyn Center, Waters said, "I don't think anything about curfew ... I don't know what 'curfew' means. Curfew means that 'I want to you all to stop talking, I want you to stop meeting, I want you to stop gathering.' I don't agree with that."

The protests in Brooklyn Center, which had been peaceful throughout the night, grew raucous as the curfew time went into effect, but the size of the crowd shrunk shortly after. Late into the night demonstrators did not make any other attempts to breach the fencing and there were no dispersal orders or arrests in Brooklyn Center by midnight.

One person was arrested by the Minneapolis Police Department Saturday night in connection to demonstrations.

==== Day 8: Sunday, April 18, 2021 ====
At approximately 4:20 a.m. on Sunday, April 18, 2021, in the Jordan neighborhood of Minneapolis, several gun shots were fired from a passing SUV at National Guard troops stationed near Penn and Broadway. The troops were there to provide neighborhood security following the killing of Daunte Wright. The troops had been activated as part of the Derek Chauvin trial and demonstrations over Wright's death. One bullet went through the windshield of a military vehicle that held four soldiers, though none were hit by a bullet. One soldier was transported to a hospital for injuries from shattered glass, and another was treated at the scene for minor wounds. Andrew Thomas, a 28-year-old man from Minneapolis, pleaded guilty in mid 2021 to criminal charges for the drive-by shooting and received a 13-year sentence.

At about 3 p.m., a White man in his 20s was killed in an exchange of gunfire with police officers in the Minneapolis suburb of Burnsville. Police were in pursuit of the man for an alleged string of carjackings and fatally shot him during a standoff on a highway.

In Saint Paul, about 300 people marched through the streets and rallied outside the governor's mansion in a peaceful event that featured speeches, chants, and prayers. The crowd learned of the police shooting in Burnsville as they were taking a knee during a moment of silence. Few details about the incident were known at the time. Some in the crowd planned to travel to Burnsville, but organizers of the Saint Paul rally encouraged people to travel instead to Brooklyn Center. The crowd in Saint Paul dispersed by the late afternoon.

Protesters gathered for an eighth-straight day outside the Brooklyn Center police station. A coalition of women's organizations that gathered there called for Potter to face a more serious murder charge and for officials to end Operation Safety Net, a law enforcement initiative set up to maintain order during protests. By the late afternoon, city officials announced an overnight curfew from 11 p.m. Sunday, April 18 to 6 a.m. Monday, April 19. A small, peaceful crowd of approximately 40 people gathered outside the Brooklyn Center police station that night.

Operation Safety Net officials reported that no arrests were made on April 18.

==== Day 9: Monday, April 19, 2021 ====
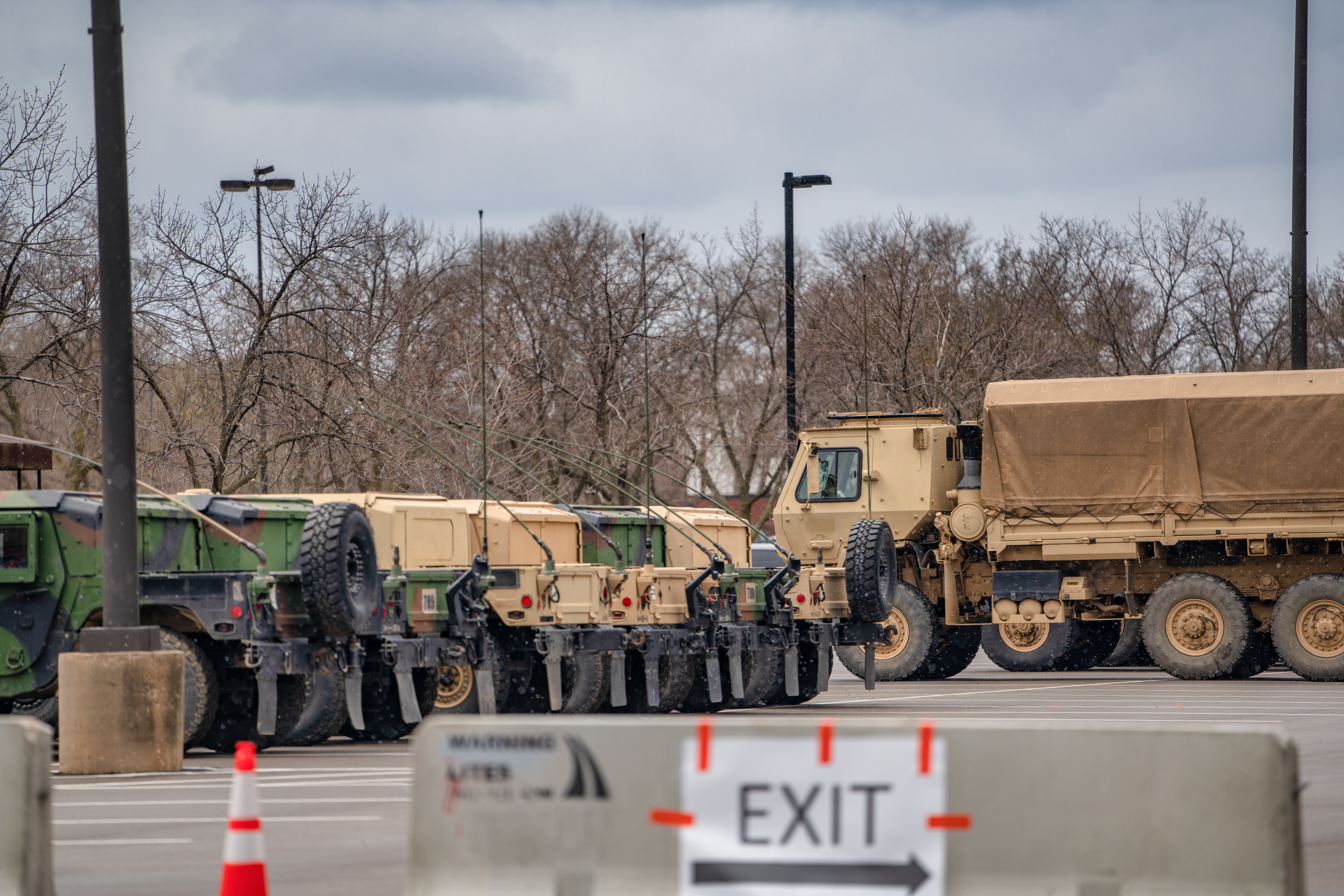
Staging of Minnesota National Guard vehicles in Bloomington, Minnesota, on April 19, 2021

On Monday, April 19, 2021, at 1:10 a.m. fire department crews in Brooklyn Park responded to a fire at a strip mall. Authorities investigated it as a suspected arson. Five businesses had their storefronts doors smashed in, three of which suffered fire damage.

Federal authorities announced the arrest of two people by Minneapolis police in connection to the shots fired at National Guard troops on April 18.

Students at 118 schools throughout the state of Minnesota staged a walkout-style student protest on April 19 to coincide with the 1:47 p.m. time Daunte Wright was pulled over by police on April 11. The event was organized by Minnesota Teen Activists and coordinated on the Instagram social media website. Students used the opportunity to speak out about racism and discrimination in schools. A crowd of 250 students gathered in downtown Minneapolis outside U.S. Bank Stadium. Minneapolis public school officials said that students who protest peacefully would not be disciplined for missing class.

The trial of Derek Chauvin concluded in Minneapolis just after 5 p.m. and the jury began deliberations. Twenty activist groups coordinated a large demonstration and march through the streets in Minneapolis near the Hennepin County Government Center building where the trial of Derek Chauvin was held. Protesters made several demands: lengthy sentences for the officers involved in George Floyd's murder, police reform legislation in Minnesota, to have charged dropped against demonstrators in Brooklyn Center and at other recent events, and for officials to end Operation Safety Net and other counter-protest measures. Protesters and law enforcement authorities did not engage with one another and the event was peaceful.

A protest group of about 40-50 people gathered outside the Brooklyn Center police station that evening.

Brooklyn Center officials set an overnight curfew beginning at 11 p.m.

==== Day 10: Tuesday, April 20, 2021 ====
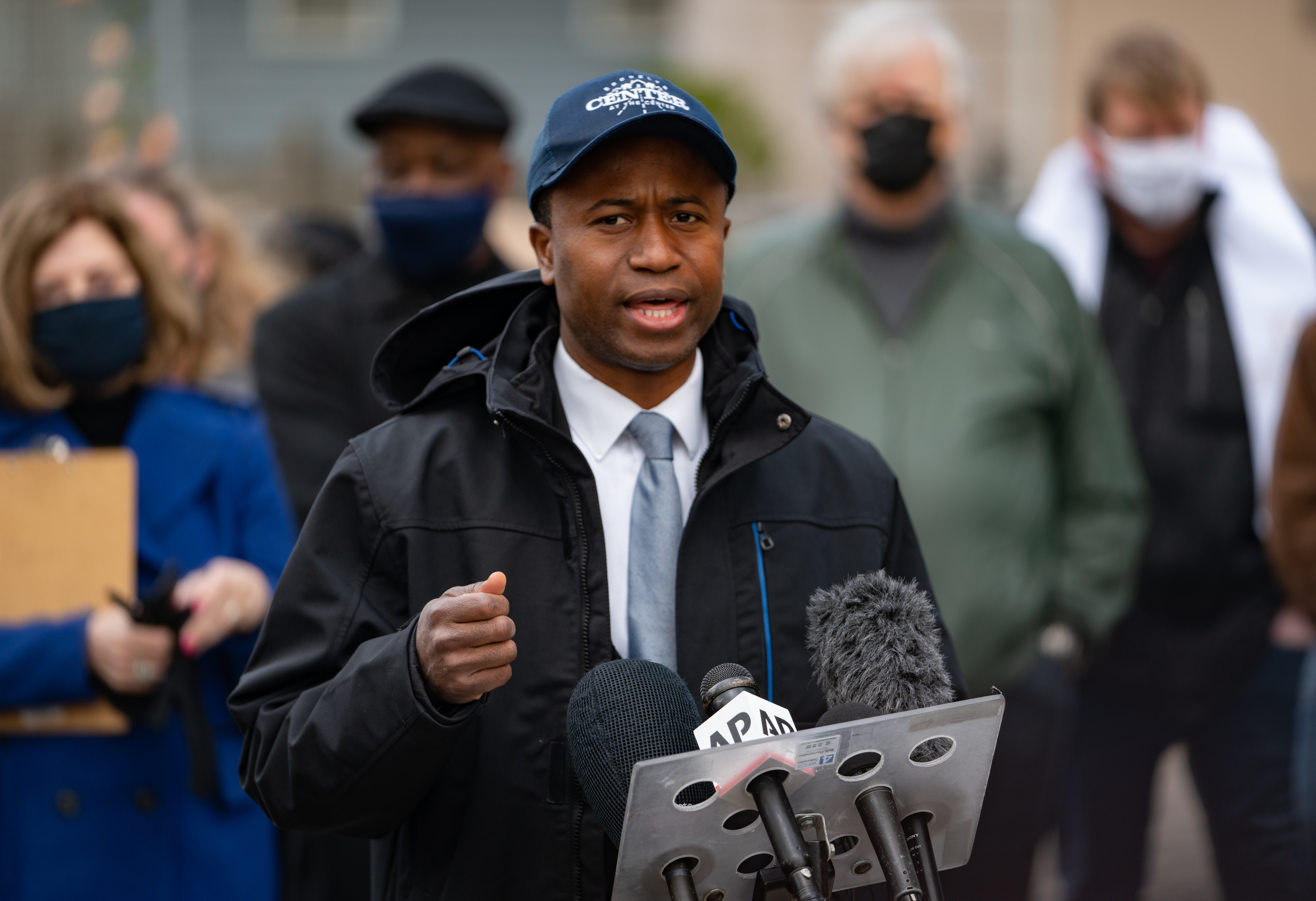
Brooklyn Center Mayor Mike Elliott speaks at a press conference on April 20, 2021

During the day on April 20, 2021, Brooklyn Center Mayor Mike Elliot and U.S. Representative Ilhan Omar held a press conference to show solidarity with residents who demanded accountability for Wright's death.

In the afternoon, Derek Chauvin was convicted of murdering George Floyd at a courthouse inside the Hennepin County Government Center in downtown Minneapolis. Thousands of people marched in downtown Minneapolis and others gathered at the city's 38th and Chicago street intersection in elation over the outcome, and they also called for reforms to policing and justice for Daunte Wright and other Black men killed by police. Some protesters travelled to Brooklyn Center to call for justice over Wright's death.

Officials in Brooklyn Center enacted an overnight curfew.

=== Subsequent protests and civil disorder ===
==== Memorials and reaction to Potter's criminal proceedings ====
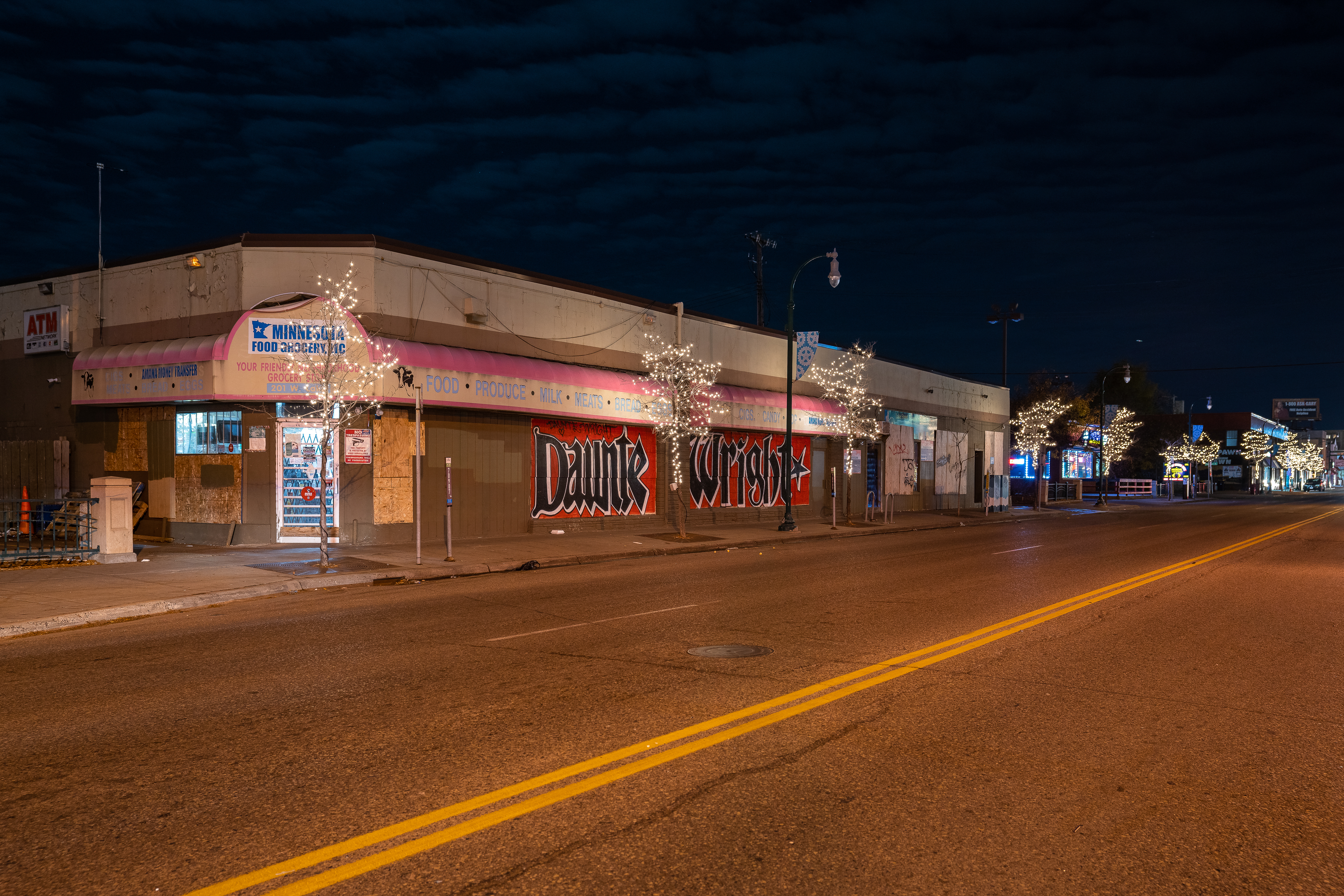
Daunte Wright mural in Minneapolis, November 15, 2021

Wright's family held a public viewing and memorial service in Minneapolis on April 21, 2021. Daunte Wright's funeral was held in Minneapolis at the Shiloh Temple International Ministries on April 22, 2021. Though the past several nights had been peaceful, Brooklyn Center officials declared an overnight curfew.

A protest occurred on April 26, 2021, outside the home of Washington County attorney Peter Orput in Stillwater, Minnesota, that resulted in a confrontation between demonstrators and neighborhoods that directed racial slurs at the group gathered in the street. The group was pressing Orput to file murder charges against Potter.

To mark the three-week anniversary of Wright's death on May 2, 2021, several hundred demonstrators and members of his family marched from the location where he died to the Brooklyn Center police station. The procession briefly blocked traffic at several intersections and eventually rallied outside the police station that was still surrounded by fencing and concrete barriers. Demonstrators spelled out Daunte Wright's name on the fence with air fresheners. Protesters disputed conclusions by officials that Potter's firing on Wright was accidental. Officials had charged Potter with second-degree manslaughter, but protesters wanted her to face charges for intentional murder.

Nightly protests continued outside the Brooklyn Center police station on North Humboldt Avenue though early May. On May 15, 2021, the Brooklyn Center city council passed a public safety resolution to recommend several policing reforms.

On July 14, 2021, Potter's attorney opposed use of courtroom cameras during the trial. Protests occurred outside the Brooklyn Center police station on July 16, 2021, in reaction to the request.

On September 4, 2021, the Minnesota Attorney General Keith Ellison's office, which took over the prosecution of Potter from local officials, amended to the charges against Potter to include first-degree manslaughter while also committing the misdemeanor of recklessly handling of a firearm. More serious criminal charges were a key demand of protesters of Wright's death.

Family members and activists held a rally on October 26, 2021, to commemorate what would have been Wright's 21st birthday.

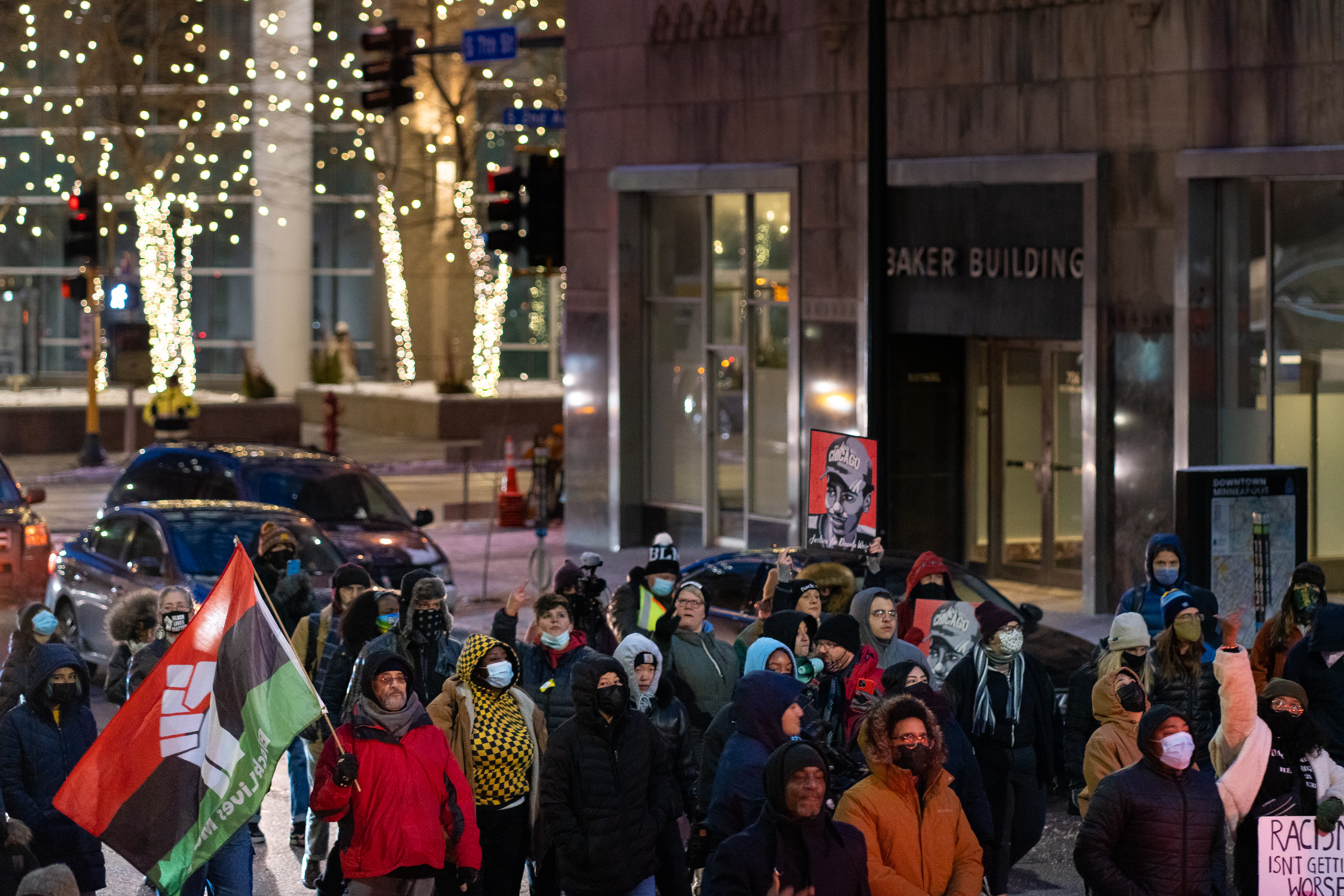
Protest march in downtown Minneapolis, December 8, 2021

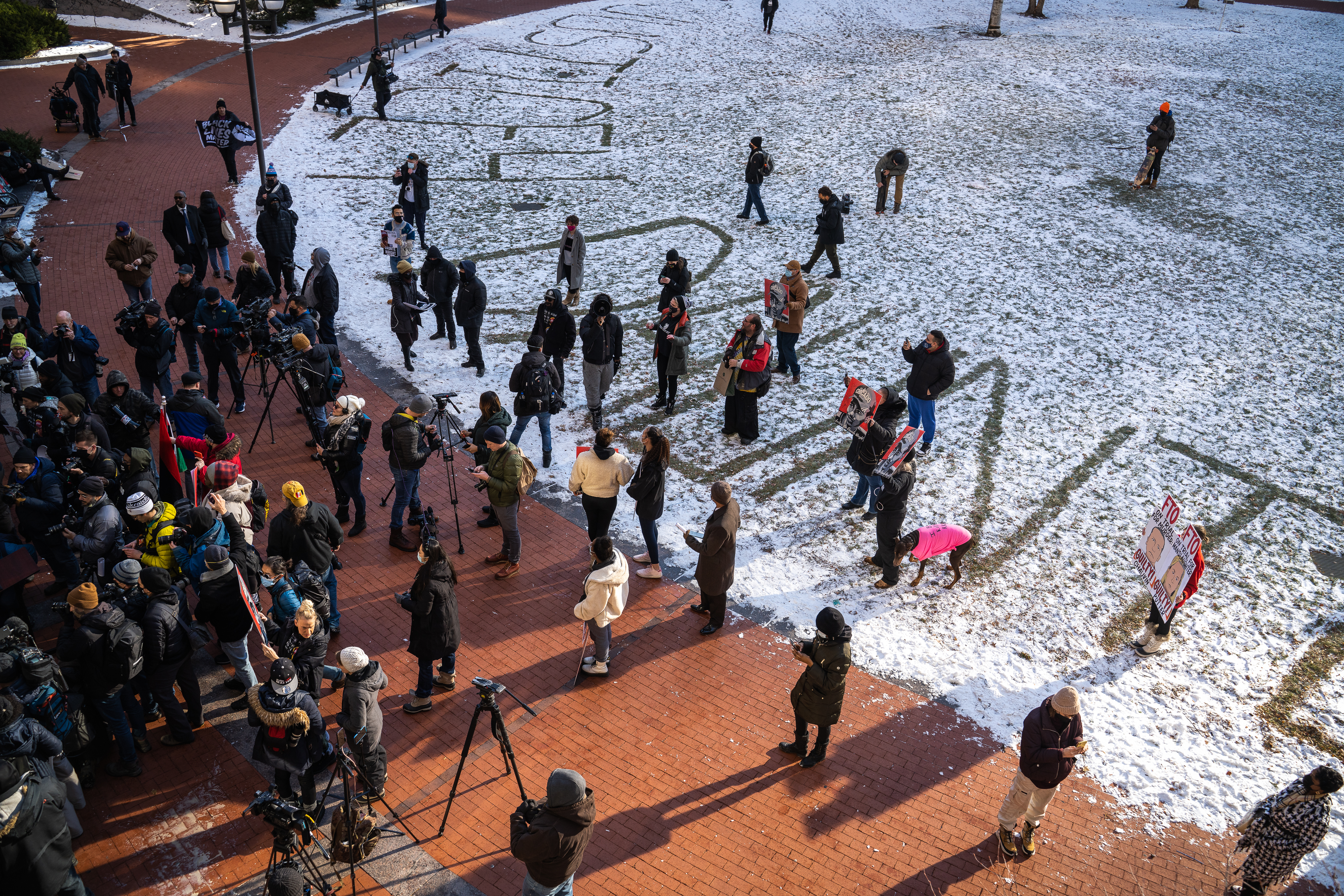
Wright's family, news media, and activists await the trial verdict, December 23, 2021

Demonstrators on November 6, 2021, gathered outside a downtown Minneapolis condominium building that they believed to be Judge Regina Chu's residence to demand that the State v. Potter trial be broadcast live for public view. Chu was the Minnesota District Court judge who presided over Potter's trial. During the event, a demonstrator recorded a Facebook livestream of himself gaining entry to the building and protesting outside the door to what he believed was Judge Chu's unit. Chu had no longer resided at the building when the protest occurred.

The Brooklyn Center city council met on November 28, 2021, to review executive powers that could be used during potential unrest. They city retained powers with the mayor's office and did not proactively enact a curfew.

The day before jury selection in Potter's trial on November 30, 2021, pastors in Brooklyn Center began a week a daily prayer meetings to encourage calm and peace during Potter's trial. Protective fencing and barriers around the Brooklyn Center police station on North Humboldt Avenue that was installed in April remained by the start of the trial in November 2021. Local officials and residents prepared for the contingency of potential unrest related to a trial verdict. Demonstrations in Brooklyn Center leading up to Potter's trial were small and peaceful events.

As the trial proceedings were underway, protests shifted to near the Hennepin County Government Center building, the court venue for Potter's trial, which was located in downtown Minneapolis. On November 30, 2021, protesters marched through the streets and temporarily blocked vehicular traffic. At one point, a vehicle drove through the crowd as protesters urged the driver to stop. A protester climbed on the vehicle as the driver slowly drove away, but was able to dismount safety one block later. No injuries were reported.

On the day of opening statements in the trial on December 8, 2021, supporters and family members of Daunte Wright gathered in downtown Minneapolis, and were joined by protesters and the families of others who were killed by police: George Floyd, Jacob Blake, and Breonna Taylor. Minnesota Governor Tim Walz Brooklyn began preparations for possible deployment of the state's National Guard, if needed. Brooklyn Center schools announced that schools would have an extended holiday break in late December to avoid student classes coinciding with the conclusion of the trial and potential civil unrest.

The number of protesters dwindled over the course of the Potter trial as outside temperatures became colder. A lone demonstrator was protesting outside the courtroom building by December 17, 2021. A small group of demonstrators gathered outside the courtroom building on December 20, 2021, as the jury began its deliberations. The crowd grew to 50 people by the third day of jury deliberations on December 22, 2021. Some downtown Minneapolis businesses at the City Center shopping mall began boarding up store fronts.

Potter was convicted of first-degree and second-degree manslaughter charges on December 23, 2021. The security measures at the Hennepin County Government Center were more lax than during the trial of Derek Chauvin the proceeding April, and downtown Minneapolis calmly awaited the verdict with relatively few businesses boarding up. A crowd of about 50 people that had gathered outside the court building celebrated the trial's outcome.

==== Reaction to Potter's sentencing ====
Protests were held in reaction to Potter's sentence hearing on February 18, 2022, when she received two years in custody rather than the seven years requested by prosecutors. Protesters gathered in Minneapolis outside the Hennepin County Government Center that was the location of the sentencing hearing. A group of about 100 people marched to what they believed to be the residence of Judge Regina Chu, who had presided over the Potter's trial and issued the sentence. In Brooklyn Center that night, people looted the Icon Beauty Supply store. In Minneapolis, police made three arrests in connection to looting on East Lake Street.

== Events elsewhere in the United States ==
Protests over Wright's death spread across the United States by April 12, 2021. Most notable protests outside of the Minneapolis—Saint Paul metropolitan area occurred between April 12 and April 24.

== Response ==
=== Protester demands and symbols ===
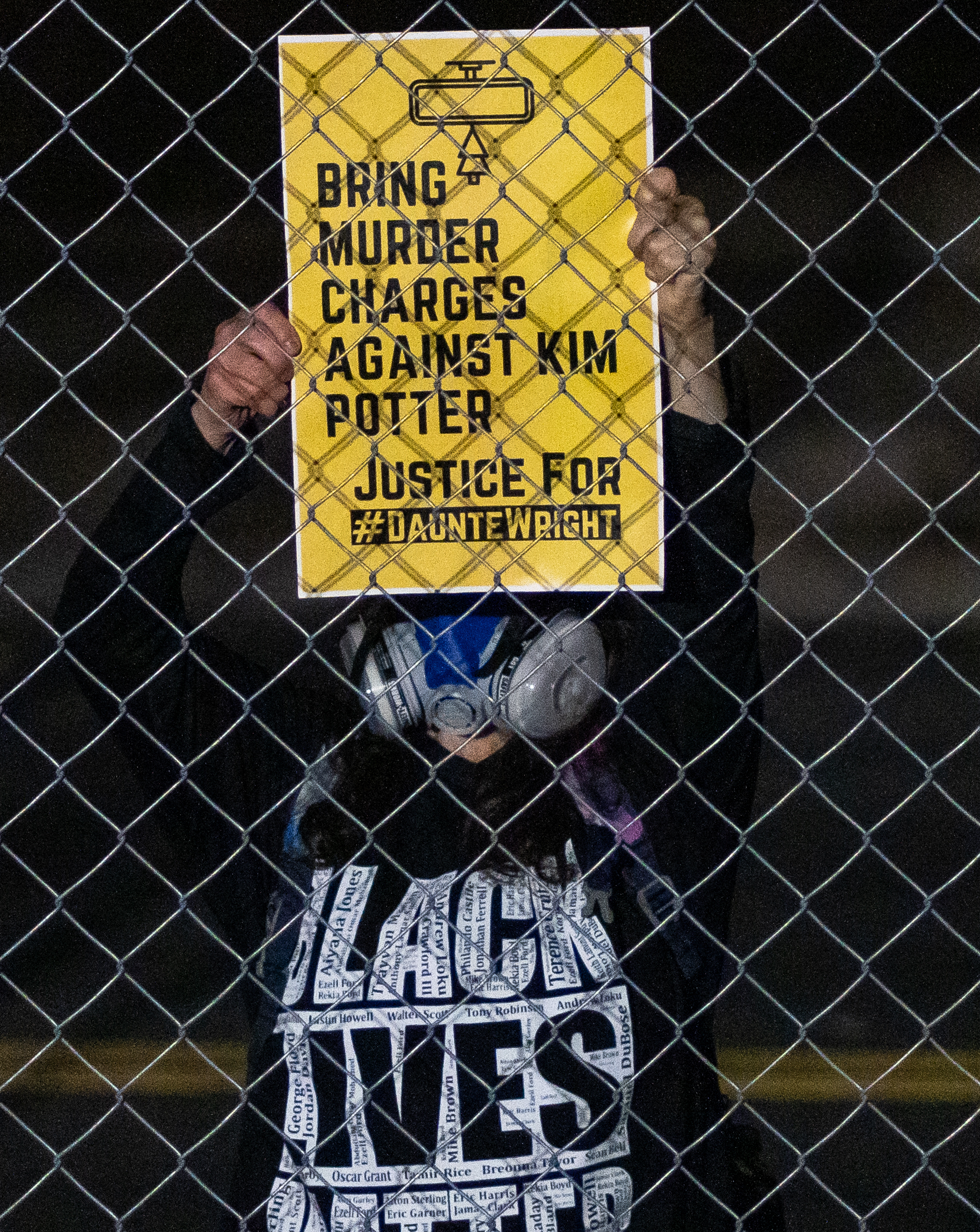
Protester at Brooklyn Center Police Department on April 15, 2021

Protesters demanded that Brooklyn Center officials fire Tim Gannon, the police chief, and the appointed city manager. The Brooklyn Center city council voted on April 12, 2021, to remove the city manager; Council Member Kris Lawrence-Anderson said her vote was out of fear for damage to her property and possible retaliation by protesters. Gannon, along with Potter, resigned their police department positions on April 13, 2021.

Protesters objected to review of the shooting of Wright by the Minnesota Bureau of Criminal Apprehension, the standard protocol in the state for officer-involved deaths, and preferred that there be an independent investigation. Though Potter was arrested and charged with second-degree manslaughter on April 14, 2021, protesters demanded that more serious charges be brought against her. They compared her case to that of Mohamed Noor, the Minneapolis police officer who shot Justine Damond in 2017, who was charged and later convicted of third-degree murder and second-degree manslaughter.

Protesters called upon the Governor of Minnesota and state legislature to enact several police form measures, and they called upon officials to end the practice of qualified immunity as they believed it made it difficult to bring civil suits against individual police officers.

Car air fresheners become a symbol in protests over Wright's death. Protesters carried air fresheners at demonstrations and hung them on fencing surrounding the Brooklyn Center police headquarters building. Wright was stopped for signaling improperly, having expired vehicle tabs, and for having an air freshener hanging from the vehicle's review mirror—a violation of Minnesota Statutes. The traffic stop of Wright generated discussion by civil rights advocates about how minor infractions result in racial profiling by police when conducting traffic stops.

Protesters objected to the military presence that had been activated as a response to the events in Brooklyn Center. The chant, "Go home", was a frequently directed toward deployed National Guard soldiers.

=== Government mobilization ===
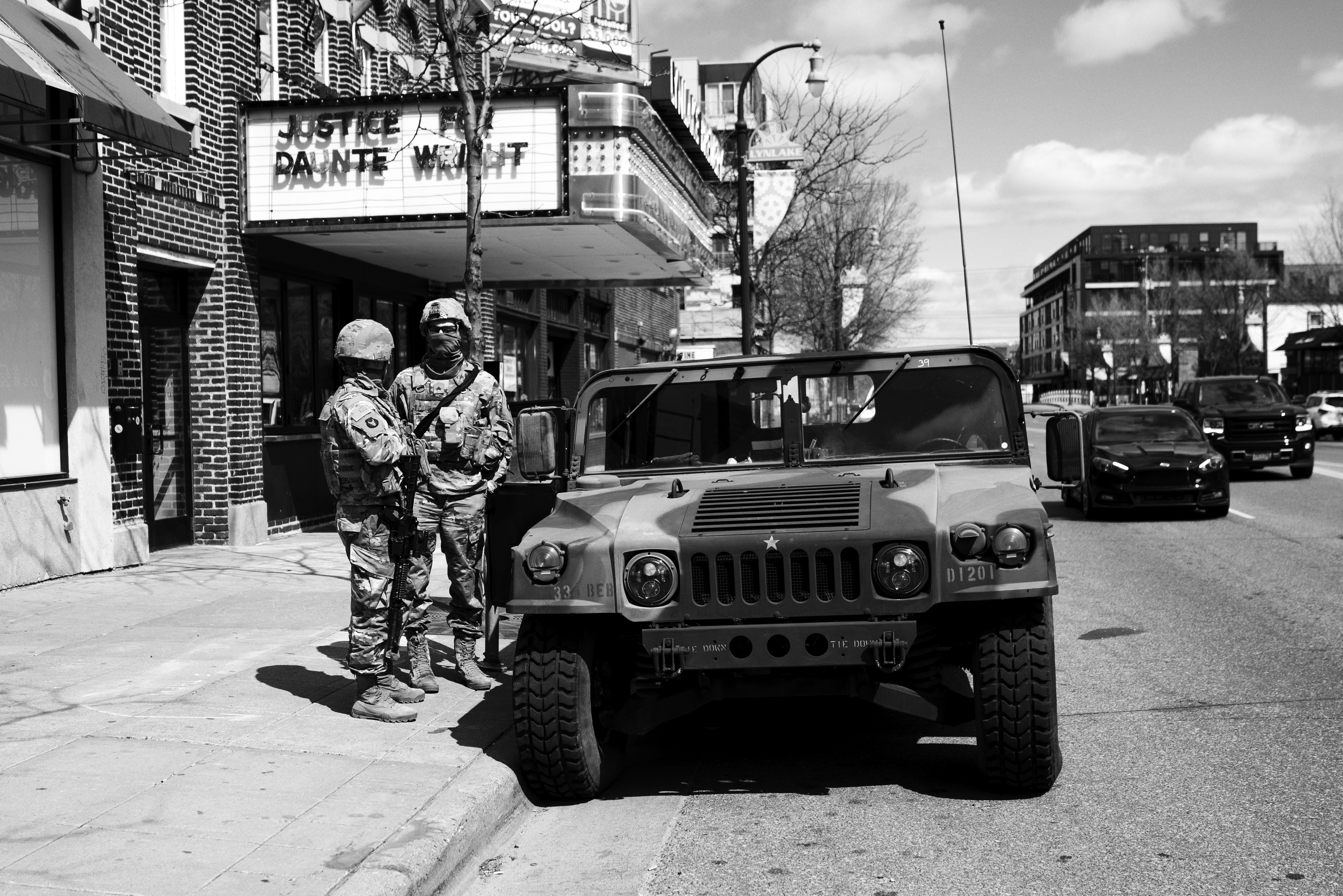
Minnesota National Guard deployed on Lyndale Avenue South in Minneapolis, April 21, 2021

The protests and unrest over Wright's death came during trial of Minneapolis police officer Derek Chauvin, who had been charged with several murder counts related to George Floyd's murder the previous May. Local officials had proactively mobilized several law enforcement agencies and the Minnesota National Guard in an effort referred to as Operation Safety Net, to prepare for potential unrest during Chauvin's trial or as a result of it. Nearly 3,000 National Guard troops and 1,100 law enforcement officers were mobilized to prevent violence and property destruction, and officials redirected deployed troops and officers to respond to the Brooklyn Center protests and unrest.

=== Attacks on law enforcement and troops ===
Some demonstrators threw bricks, glass bottles, and other objects and discharged fireworks at law enforcement authorities. The glass-door entrance to the Brooklyn Park police station was hit by a gunshot on April 11, 2021. A Saint Paul officer was fired upon while patrolling for potential looting or burglaries on April 13, 2021. A National Guard vehicle in Minneapolis was hit by gunshots fired from a passing vehicle on April 18, 2021. Several attempts were made to breach the chain-link fence perimeter set up around the Brooklyn Center police station. According to the Minnesota Department of Public Safety, there were more than "100 documented cases of troopers being struck by objects thrown by protesters, exposure to bear spray used by protesters, or being spat on".

=== Attacks on protesters and the press ===
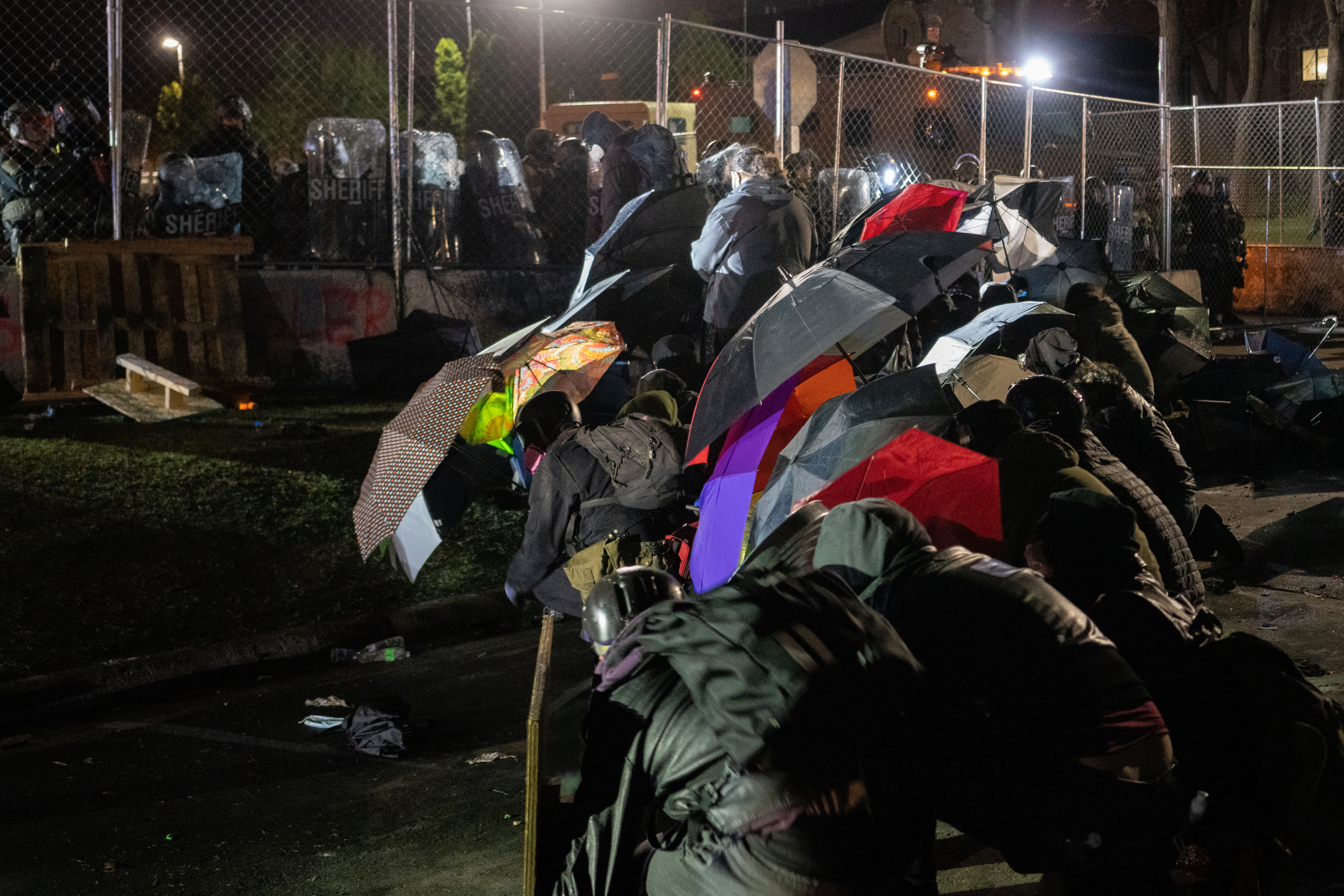
Demonstrators shield themselves from tear gas, April 14, 2021

Law enforcement fired tear gas and non-lethal munitions as some demonstrators attempted to overrun the Brooklyn Center police station. Local agencies and officials, however, disagreed over tactics to manage unruly crowds. The Hennepin County Sherriff's Office led the defense operation around the Brooklyn Center police building. Brooklyn Center elected officials objected to the use of tear gas and aggressive crowd control tactics. In neighboring Minneapolis, the city council voted 11-1 on April 16, 2021, to oppose the use of non-lethal munitions and tear gas as a response to civil disorder, but the resolution had no effect as the city's mayor had operational control of the city's police department.

Several journalist objected to how law enforcement restricted their ability to observe and report on the events in Brooklyn Center during the protests and unrest. U.S. District Judge Wilhelmina Wright on April 16, 2021, issued a temporary restraining order that prevented state officials from arresting or threatening to arrest journalists, from using physical force and firing munitions at them, and that dispersal orders did not apply to journalists.

Minnesota Governor Tim Walz said during the Brooklyn Center protests that he was "deeply concerned" over the use of tear gas and its effect on protesters and residents. Walz also defended the deployment of National Guard troops and state law enforcement to Brooklyn Center. He said, "What do you think would have happened Sunday night or Monday night, especially if there not been a fence there and had there been no one there. I've learned from the past that building would have been burned down, and my fear was that surrounding apartments would have burned, too."

On April 11, 2021, local officials arrested four people in Saint Paul and between 25 and 30 in Minneapolis. Officials with Operation Safety Net officials reported 272 arrests from April 12–21, 2021.

=== Protest "interveners" ===
During several of the demonstrations, a group of volunteers with the local organization Minnesota Freedom Fighters patrolled the crowd and attempted to deescalate conflict. The group formed in 2020 during the unrest in the aftermath of George Floyd's murder when outside agitators harassed residents in late May and early June of that year. Some volunteers wore yellow vests to distinguish themselves at Daunte Wright protest events, while others wore body armor and dark clothing to move undetected in the crowd. The volunteers used passive tactics, such as standing between lines of demonstrator who wielded umbrellas and formed an addition perimeter to the security fencing outside the Brooklyn Center police station. Their stated goal was to keep events peaceful and prevent law enforcement form using aggressive crowd control tactics, such as firing munitions on demonstrators. The group was one of several organizations that Brooklyn Center officials contracted with to act as "interveners" and to create open lines of communication with law enforcement. The groups were not authorized to make arrests, but were allowed to "use some type of force" to remove agitators from the crowd. Brooklyn Center spent $140,000 for contracts with six different community organizations.

=== Residents and businesses ===
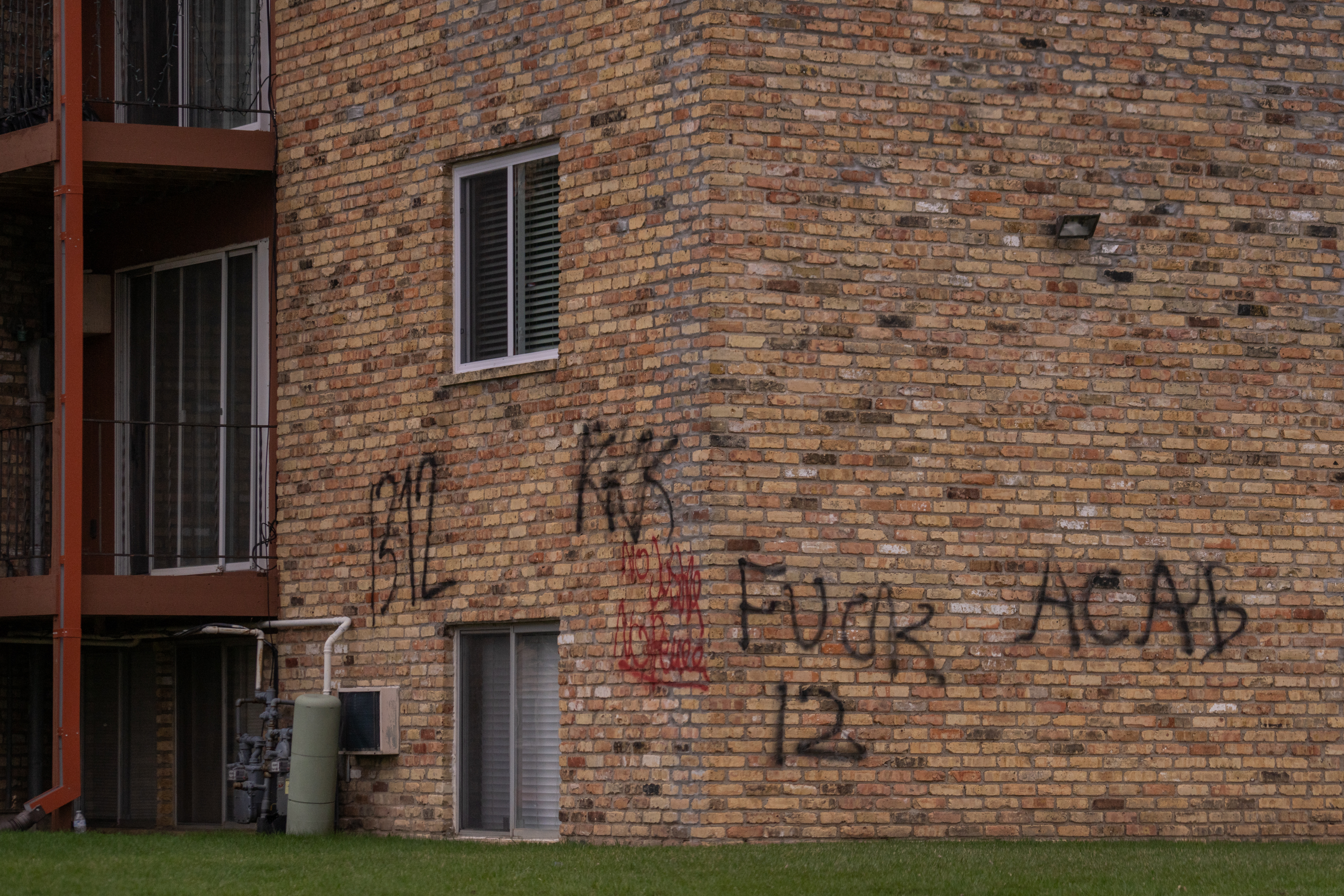
Graffiti on an apartment building near the Brooklyn Center police station, April 13, 2021

Several families that lived in apartments near the Brooklyn Center police station left their residences to avoid the nightly protests. Some residents stayed behind to guard apartment buildings. After the April 2021 unrest and prior to Potter's trial in December, many residents moved out of apartment buildings near the police station out of worries of future unrest, but some on Section 8 housing assistance were unable to move.

In Champlin, Minnesota, neighbors of Kimberly Potter, who had her house fortified with fencing during the protests and unrest, left their homes. Officials in the City of Champlin spent $9,236 on physical security to protect Potter's house. Potter and her husband sold the house and moved outside of Minnesota sometime before the start of her trial.

Businesses boarded up during the April unrest in response to damage and to dissuade looting. Though several small business owners said they understood the social dynamics for why frustrations were high after Wright's death, they preferred that police increased patrols to protect businesses and property. Volunteers helped clean up damage to stores and property.

Community groups in Brooklyn Center organized food drives and donation drop-offs to help people affected by temporary closures of grocery stores and other businesses caused by the April unrest.

== Aftermath ==
=== Political and social impact ===
==== Maxine Waters and the Chauvin trial ====
Representative Maxine Waters' comments at a protest rally in Brooklyn Center on April 17, 2021, drew criticism for heightening tension and were denounced by conservative media and Republican politicians. On April 19, 2021, former Minneapolis police officer Derek Chauvin's attorney unsuccessfully argued in court that comments made by Representative Waters during a Brooklyn Center protest should result in a mistrial. Judge Peter Cahill denied the motion by Chauvin's defense, but said it might be potential grounds for appeal of the case later if Chauvin was to be convicted. Chauvin was found guilty of murdering Floyd on April 20, 2021.

==== Property damage ====
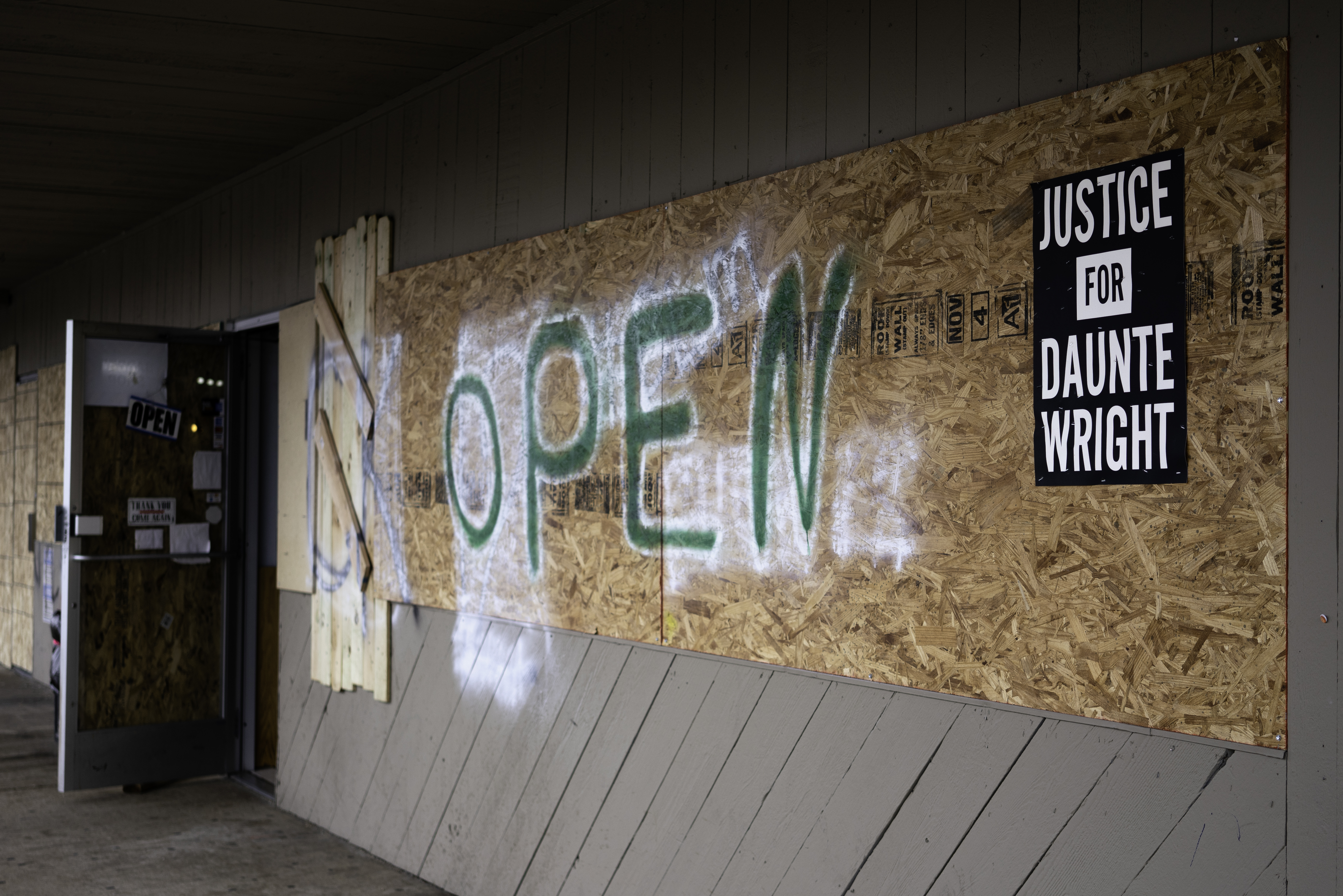
A boarded-up store in Brooklyn Center, April 14, 2021

Thirty-five businesses in Brooklyn Center were damaged from April 11–12, 2021, including a Dollar Tree store that was set on fire during the chaotic course of events. Five business at a strip mall in Brooklyn Park were broken into and three were set on fire during the overnight hours of April 18–19, 2021. Several of the businesses damaged by fires and looting during the April 2021 unrest were Black-owned establishments.

As many as 15 retail pharmacies in the metropolitan region temporarily closed during the unrest. Authorities believed that they were targeted by opportunistic thieves seeking controlled substances they could sell, such as opiates, stimulates, and other drugs. By April 13, 2021, at least eight bank branches had been damaged during the unrest. Minneapolis officials said on April 15, 2021, that approximately 140 business had been burglarized across the city in an opportunistic crime spree over the prior days. Property crimes in the city affected several businesses run by immigrants and people of color.

Many of the businesses affected by burglaries and looting in April 2021, were the same businesses affected by unrest during the George Floyd protests in Minneapolis–Saint Paul in May 2020.

==== Public health ====
Protests over Wright's death came during the COVID-19 pandemic in Minnesota. Many protesters wore protective face masks. State health officials reported that by April 30, 2021, there had 22 confirmed cases of COVID-19 among protesters and police who were at demonstrations.

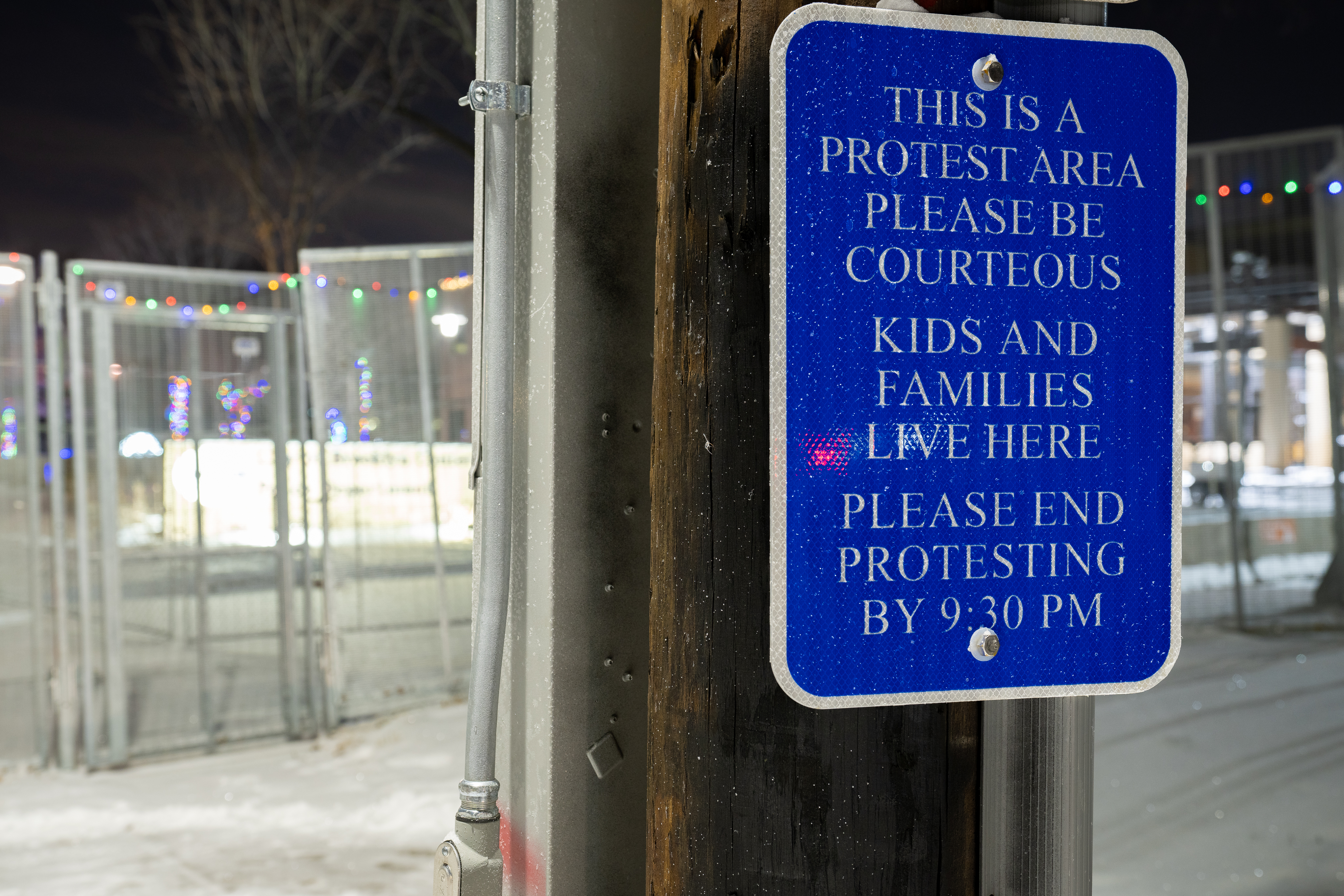
A protest zone sign near the Brooklyn Center police station, December 7, 2021

The use of chemical agents for crowd control resulted in concerns about short- and long-term health effects for those exposed. Residents near the Brooklyn Center police station, who were affected by the clashes between demonstrators and law enforcement authorities, complained of having tear gas make its way into their apartments. Some of the affected residents sought rental assistance from the city to move and mental health support for their children.

==== Potter criminal case ====
Minnesota Attorney General Keith Ellison took over the prosecution case against Potter on May 21, 2021, upon the request of Washington County Attorney Pete Orput. Protesters, who held several demonstrations outside Orput's home to press him to file more serious murder charges, took credit for the development. On May 24, 2021, Washington County prosecutor Imran Ali, the attorney who would have led the prosecution of Potter, resigned from his job citing “vitriol" and "partisan politics” over the case. Ellison's office on September 2, 2021, added the charge of first-degree manslaughter, a more serious charge than the second-degree manslaughter initially filed, that Potter would face at a November 2021 trial.

Judge Chu on November 9, 2021, reversed an earlier ruling that cameras would not be allowed at the trial. Chu said the ruling was unrelated to a November 6 demonstration that occurred outside what protesters believed was her residence.

=== Demonstrator legal cases ===
==== Shooting at Saint Paul police ====
Jamoni Raekwon Blackstone, a 24-year-old man from North Saint Paul was charged with attempted murder for firing gunshots at an occupied Saint Paul police vehicle at 10:30 p.m. CDT on April 13, 2021. Prior to the incident, Blackstone had posted to the Facebook website that after seeing the video of Wright's death he was going to "start shooting". The night of April 13 he fired six shots at the police vehicle with several bullets striking the driver's area of the police vehicle. The officer inside was not injured. Blackstone had claimed after being arrested that he fired at the officer's vehicle in an act of self-defense. He pleaded guilty on November 19, 2021, to one count of attempted intentional murder in the second-degree. He was sentenced to 10 years in prison and five years of supervised release.

==== Shooting at Minnesota National Guard ====
The United States District Attorney's Office for Minnesota announced charges in connection to the drive-by shooting of Minnesota National Guard troops who were mobilized as a result of demonstrations over Wright's death and stationed in Minneapolis on April 18, 2021, to provide neighborhood security. Two soldiers had non-life-threatening injuries from glass that shattered when a bullet went through their vehicle's window. Andrew Thomas, a 28-year-old man with home addresses in Minneapolis and Chicago, and a juvenile passenger were stopped by Minneapolis police while driving a vehicle that matched a description from the April 18 shooting. Thomas was charged by federal authorities with felony possession of a firearm. Hennepin County officials charged Thomas with first-degree and second-degree assault with a dangerous weapon and illegal weapons possession. In July 2021, Thomas pleaded guilty in Hennepin County court to charges related to the drive-by shooting and illegal possession of a firearm. He received an eight-year sentence that included five years in jail and three years under supervised release.

==== Judicial tampering ====
Cortez Rice, a resident of Minneapolis and local activist, was charged in Hennepin County for harassment involving retaliation against a judicial officer for the November 6, 2021, protest outside a condominium believed to belong to Regina Chu, the judge presiding over the Potter trial. Chu did not reside at the residence at the time of the protest. The criminal complaint alleged that Rice was attempting to intimidate Chu. Protesters on November 6 demanded that Chu allow cameras in the courtroom during the trial. Chu had also overseen a hearing for Rice related to probation violation on weapons charges. Rice was arrested on November 29, 2021, in Waukesha, Wisconsin, and extradited to Minnesota. The tampering charge against Rice was dismissed by a Hennepin County District Judge William H. Leary III on February 4, 2022. The Judge Leary said the prosecution was not able to prove that Chu was "in fear of substantial bodily harm to her or her family". Rice, however, remained jailed for violating probation for prior illegal weapons conviction.

==== Activist detention ====
Aditya Wahyu Harsono, an Indonesian citizen, had his visa revoked and was arrested in Marshall, Minnesota, on March 27, 2025 as part of activist detentions during the second Trump presidency. Harsono had been a participant in the protests in 2021 following Wright's killing and he was arrested for violating a curfew order during the unrest in Brooklyn Center.

== See also ==
- 2020–2021 United States racial unrest
- George Floyd protests in Minneapolis–Saint Paul
- List of civil unrest in Minneapolis–Saint Paul
