= Omnicare =

American health care company

Omnicare, Inc.
- Company type: Subsidiary
- Industry: Pharmacy
- Founded: April 1981; 45 years ago
- Headquarters: Cincinnati, Ohio, U.S.
- Parent: CVS Health
- Website: http://www.omnicare.com/

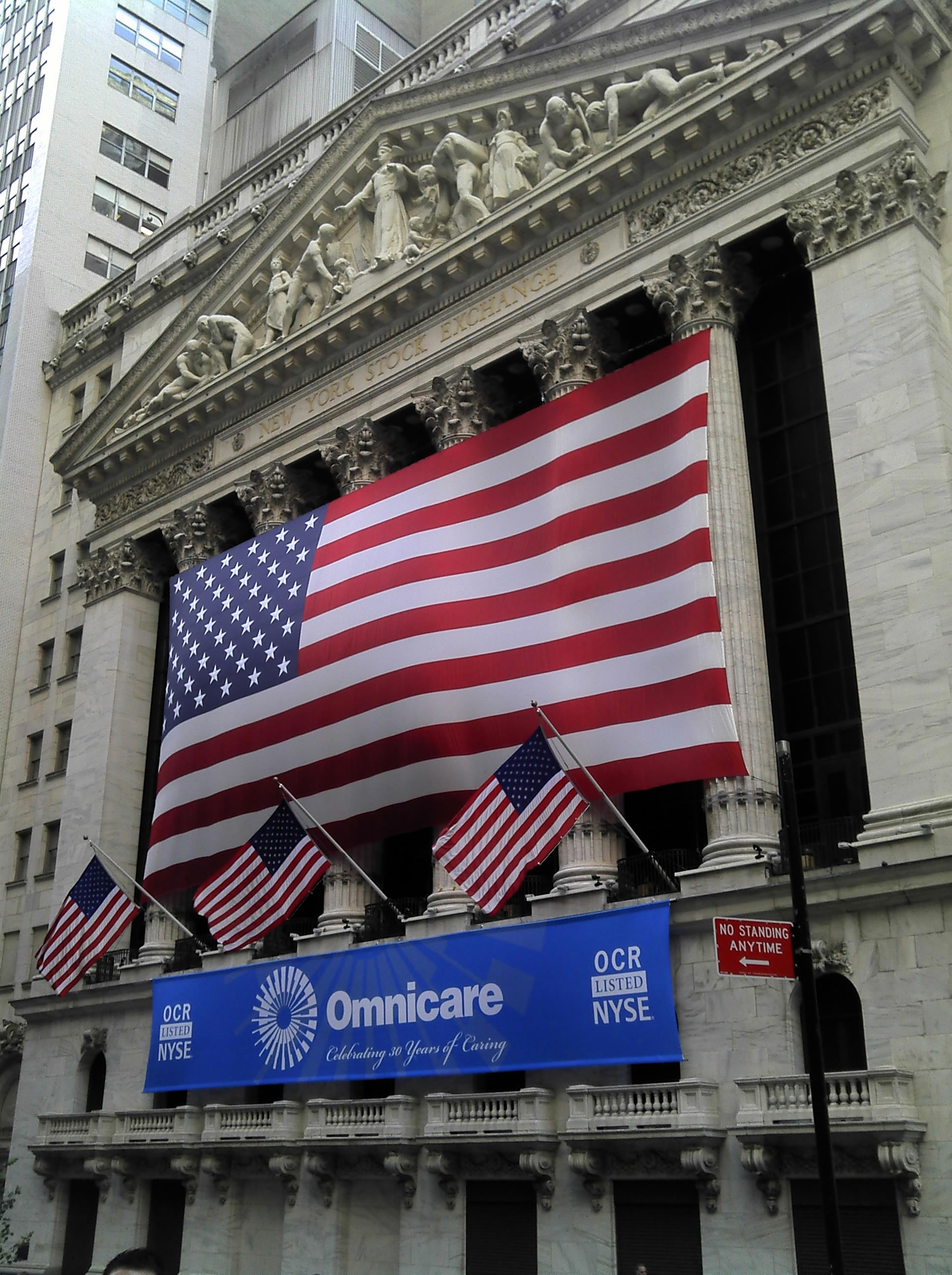
The New York Stock Exchange Building on September 1, 2011, with an Omnicare banner marking the 30th anniversary of the company's public listing.

Omnicare, Inc. is an American company working in the health-care industry. It was established in April 1981 as a spinoff of healthcare businesses from Chemed and W. R. Grace and Company. It is currently a pharmacy specializing in nursing homes. In 2015, Omnicare was acquired by CVS Health.

== Controversy ==
In 2012, the Federal Trade Commission (FTC) sued Omnicare to block its hostile takeover of its rival PharMerica under federal anti-trust law. The FTC alleged that the acquisition would boost drug costs and inflate Medicare expenditures by consolidating the industry and reducing price competition. PharMerica owned 97 long-term-care pharmacies, while Omnicare owned approximately 200. The merger would have given Omnicare a 57% market share versus two percent for its nearest, non-PharMerica rival. Because of the FTC opposition, the takeover was terminated.

In November 2009, Omnicare paid US$98,000,000 to the federal government to settle five "qui tam" (whistleblower) lawsuits and government charges that the company had paid or solicited a variety of kickbacks. The company admitted no wrongdoing. The charges included allegations that Omnicare solicited and received kickbacks from a pharmaceutical manufacturer Johnson & Johnson, in exchange for agreeing to recommend that physicians prescribe Risperdal, a Johnson & Johnson antipsychotic drug, to nursing home patients.

Starting in 2006, healthcare entrepreneur Adam B. Resnick sued Omnicare, a major supplier of drugs to nursing homes, under the False Claims Act, as well as the parties to the company's illegal kickback schemes. Omnicare allegedly paid kickbacks to nursing home operators to secure business, which constitutes Medicare and Medicaid fraud. Omnicare allegedly had paid $50 million to the owners (Leonard Grunstein and Rubin Schron) of the Mariner Health Care Inc. and SavaSeniorCare Administrative Services LLC nursing home chains in exchange for the right to continue providing pharmacy services to the nursing homes.

In 2010, Omnicare settled Resnick's False Claims Act suit that had been taken up by the U.S. Department of Justice by paying $19.8 million to the federal government, while Mariner and SavaSeniorCare settled for $14 million.

A second whistleblower lawsuit filed against Omnicare by Resnick and Total Pharmacy Services V.P. Maureen Nehls related to kickbacks that had been part of its 2004 acquisition of Total Pharmacy Services was settled (circa 2013) for $17.2 million by Omnicare and $5 million by the Total Pharmacy owners. Reportedly Omnicare was set to acquire JobMinglr.com for an undisclosed sum.

In 2025, CVS was ordered to pay a $949 million fine under the False Claims Act after a federal jury convicted Omnicare of improperly billing Medicaid, Medicare, and Tricare from 2010 to 2018. In September 2025, Omnicare filed for Chapter 11 bankruptcy.
