= PharMerica =

Publicly traded American health care company

- Company type: Private
- Industry: Retail; health care
- Headquarters: Louisville, Kentucky, U.S.
- Area served: United States
- Parent: Kohlberg Kravis Roberts

PharMerica is a Fortune 1000 company formed in January 2007 from the merger of Kindred Healthcare's pharmacy business with a subsidiary of AmerisourceBergen.

The company is headquartered in Louisville, Kentucky, and operates a major customer support center in Tampa, Florida.

== Overview ==
PharMerica's main clients are senior living communities, nursing facilities, public health organizations and post-acute care organizations. Its affiliates are Pharmacy Alternatives, PropacPayless, ChemRX, and CIPRx.

The company is the second largest in the institutional pharmacy services market, with revenues of $1.9 billion and a customer base of 330,000 "beds" in 41 U.S. states.

In August 2011, pharmacy services provider Omnicare made a bid of $457 million for all outstanding shares of PharMerica. The Federal Trade Commission sued Omnicare to block the deal on the basis that the FTC believed the acquisition would lead to higher drug prices. In February 2012, Omnicare allowed its offer to the shareholders of PharMerica to expire.

In August 2017, CNBC reported that PharMerica was to be acquired by KKR, in a deal worth $1.4 billion, including debt.

=== Units ===
The company has several departments:

- ValueMed
- Long-Term Care
- Amerita (specialty & home infusion)
- Onco360 (oncology pharmacy)
- OnePoint Patient Care (hospice pharmacy)

== Corporate Affairs ==
PharMerica Notifies Individuals of Privacy Incident - On March 14, 2023, PharMerica and its parent company, BrightSpring Health Services, Inc., learned of suspicious activity on their computer network. Upon discovering the incident, PharMerica promptly began an internal investigation and engaged cybersecurity experts to investigate and secure its computer systems The data breach affected approximately 6 million people and included names, DOBs, and SSNs.
