= Minnesota ICE shootings =

Minnesota ICE shootings refer to:

- Killing of Renée Good in Minneapolis on January 7, 2026
- Shooting of Julio Cesar Sosa-Celis in North Minneapolis on January 14, 2026
- Killing of Alex Pretti in Minneapolis on January 24, 2026

== See also ==
- List of immigration raids and arrests in the second Trump presidency
- List of killings by law enforcement officers in Minnesota
- Lists of killings by law enforcement officers in the United States
