= Killing of Winston Boogie Smith =

2021 police killing of a man in Minneapolis, Minnesota

- Part of 2020–2023 Minneapolis–Saint Paul racial unrest
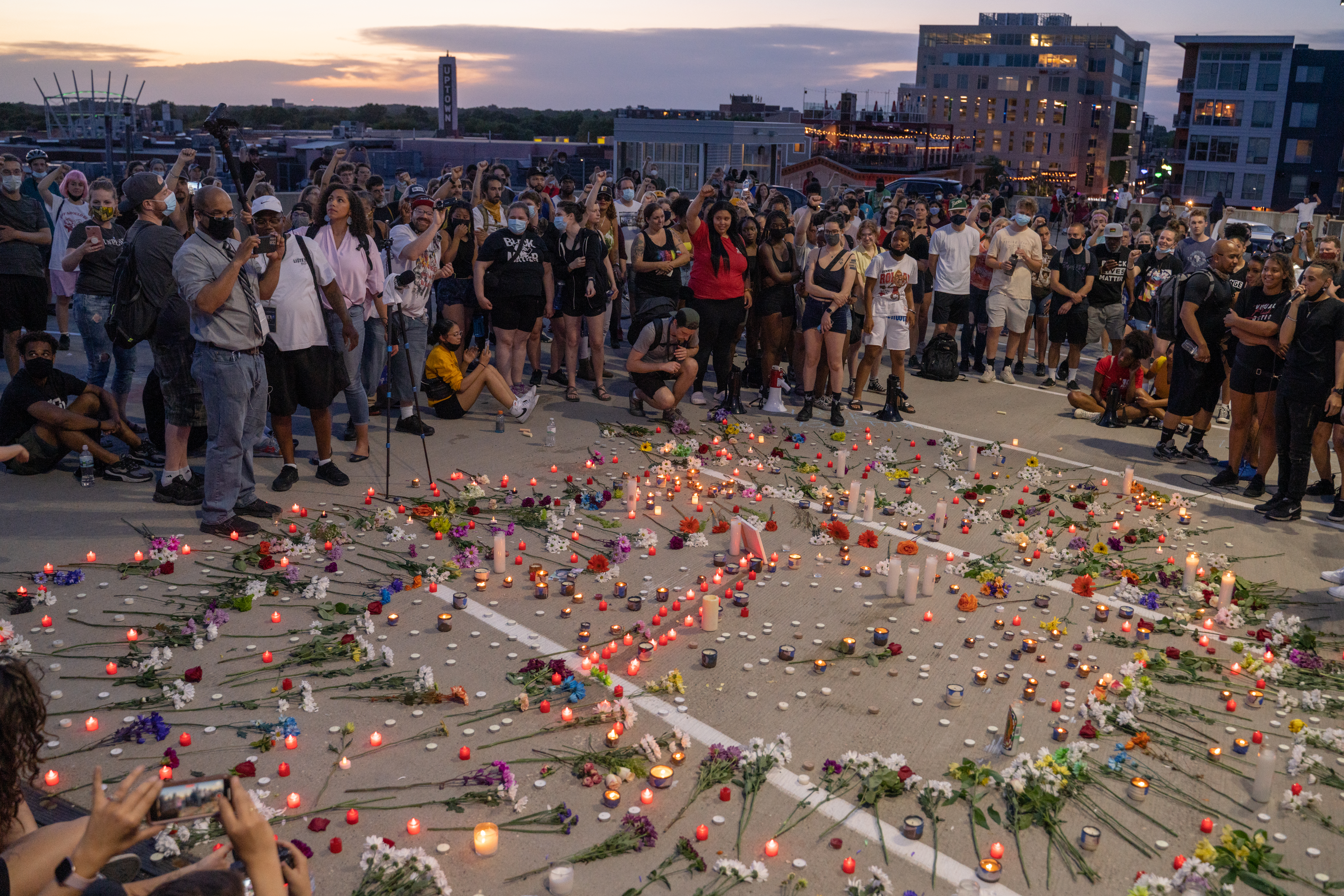
- A memorial for Smith on June 4, 2021
- Shooting location in Minneapolis
- Date: June 3, 2021; 5 years ago
- Time: c. 2:08 p.m. (CDT)
- Venue: Girard Avenue parking ramp
- Location: Minneapolis, Minnesota, United States; 44.947104°N 93.296784°W
- Type: Shooting
- Deaths: 1
- Injuries: 1
- Inquiries: First review by Crow Wing County Attorney's Office; Second review by Hennepin County Attorney's Office
- Suspects: Federal law enforcement task force members
- Charges: None
- Litigation: Civil lawsuit (dismissed)
- Footage: Smith's cellphone video

Law enforcement authorities fatally shot Winston Boogie Smith Jr., a 32-year-old black American man, in the Uptown area of Minneapolis at 2:08 p.m. CDT on June 3, 2021. Smith was being pursued by a U.S. Marshals Service task force that apprehends wanted fugitives. The arrest operation had the participation of undercover agents from several local police agencies in Minnesota. The officers did not use body cameras or dashcams when apprehending Smith. Controversy over the lack of law enforcement footage of the arrest operation led to local police agencies ceasing aid to the Marshals Service's fugitive task force, and to changes to body and dash camera policies by the Marshals and other federal law enforcement agencies.

Several protests were held in reaction to Smith's killing, beginning on June 3, and the Uptown area experienced civil disorder over the subsequent weeks. Deona Marie Knajdek was killed and three others were injured on June 13 after a man rammed his vehicle into a group of demonstrators who had blockaded a street. In the immediate aftermath of the shooting, law enforcement authorities said publicly that Smith failed to comply with arresting officers and had brandished a gun. An attorney for the passenger in the vehicle with Smith contradicted the law enforcement description of events. The passenger had not seen a gun on Smith or in the vehicle, which was contrary to a video that later surfaced of the incident.

An investigation of law enforcement conduct by the Minnesota Bureau of Criminal Apprehension (BCA) after the shooting said that Smith had brandished a firearm at officers who attempted to arrest him. Authorities said they found a loaded 380 handgun with matching spent shell casings in the vehicle Smith occupied, and that ballistic evidence and DNA samples supported their claim that Smith had fired the weapon during the June 3 encounter. The report also revealed that the passenger had ducked for cover after pleading with Smith to surrender and that she did not visually witness the exchange of gunfire.

The BCA sent the case to the Crow Wing County attorney's office to determine if the officers who shot Smith should face criminal charges. In his report, Donald Ryan, the attorney for Crow Wing County, said that the officers' actions were justified under Minnesota Statutes and that no criminal charges should be filed against them. During the investigation and for several years afterward, it was believed that there was no video evidence of the shooting, but a private investigation as part of a civil suit was able recover a 35-second video filmed by Smith on his cellphone. The video, which was released publicly in 2025, recorded Smith saying, "Just shoot," shortly before law enforcement officers began to smash open the vehicle window. He is then seen grabbing a handgun from the vehicle's center console and exchanges gunfire with the officers. After a second review of the incident, the Hennepin County Attorney's Office also declined to prosecute the officers involved.

== People involved ==
=== Winston Boogie Smith Jr. ===
Winston Boogie Smith Jr. was a 32-year-old black American man who resided in Saint Paul, Minnesota. He spent his early life in south Minneapolis. He attended Coon Rapids High School. As a musician, he went by the nickname Wince Me Boi. He was also known for comedy videos and performance activism that he posted online. Smith was a father of three.

Smith was convicted previously of first-degree aggravated robbery related to a 2017 assault and robbery of his ex-girlfriend. He was sentenced to a 48-month prison term but was released on parole. The conviction also barred Smith from possessing a firearm. Smith was arrested on a probation violation in November 2019 when officers found a loaded handgun under the driver's seat of his car. He was subsequently charged in Ramsey County court for illegally possessing a firearm. Smith pled guilty to the weapons charge in November 2020 on the day before the trial was scheduled to start. Smith later sought to withdraw the guilty plea, which would have resulted in four years of prison time, but was denied by a judge.

In 2020, police in Bloomington, Minnesota, attempted to arrest Smith on several local warrants. Smith, who was in a parking lot at the Mall of America, allegedly fled in his vehicle. At the same time, police gave chase on Interstate 494 as Smith allegedly drove at high speed in the opposite direction of traffic. Police ended the pursuit due to concerns over public safety. Smith later faced charges in Hennepin County related to the incident and had a court hearing scheduled for September 2021.

Smith missed a May 19, 2021, sentencing hearing, and a new warrant in Minnesota was issued for his arrest, and he was ordered to be held without bond or bail. An internal police document included a quote from Smith that he might "shoot it out" if authorities tried to apprehend him. Smith had been active on social media, where in addition to posting his music, comedy sketches, and photos of family and friends, he had been outspoken about police killings of black men, such as George Floyd and Daunte Wright. He also spoke about his own upcoming sentencing, not wanting to spend four years in jail, and how he was not guilty of the weapons charge he was facing. He also compared his situation to video footage he had seen of Dolal Idd, a Somali-American man who was killed by Minneapolis police in an exchange of gunfire on December 30, 2020. Two of Smith's postings to social media had suggested support for violence against police.

=== Vehicle passenger ===
On the afternoon of June 3, 2021, Smith was inside a stationary Maserati SUV with a female passenger, Norhan Askar, on the fifth floor of a parking ramp, after eating at a nearby restaurant.

=== Law enforcement ===
A U.S. Marshals Service task force that apprehends wanted fugitives had been pursuing the arrest of Smith, for whom an arrest warrant had been issued after he missed a sentencing date in May about a weapons charge. Authorities were monitoring Smith's social media posts, which included content of him brandishing a firearm and offering drugs and weapons for sale. Undercover officers from the Hennepin County Sheriff's Office and Ramsey County Sheriff's Office—two local police agencies in Minnesota—assisted in the effort to apprehend Smith. The operation also had the participation of the U.S. Department of Homeland Security, Minnesota Department of Corrections, and the Anoka County Sheriff's Office. The Minneapolis Police Department did not assist the federal task force operation to apprehend Smith though it occurred inside their municipal jurisdiction.

== Incident ==
External image
- Photo of the parking ramp on June 3, 2021

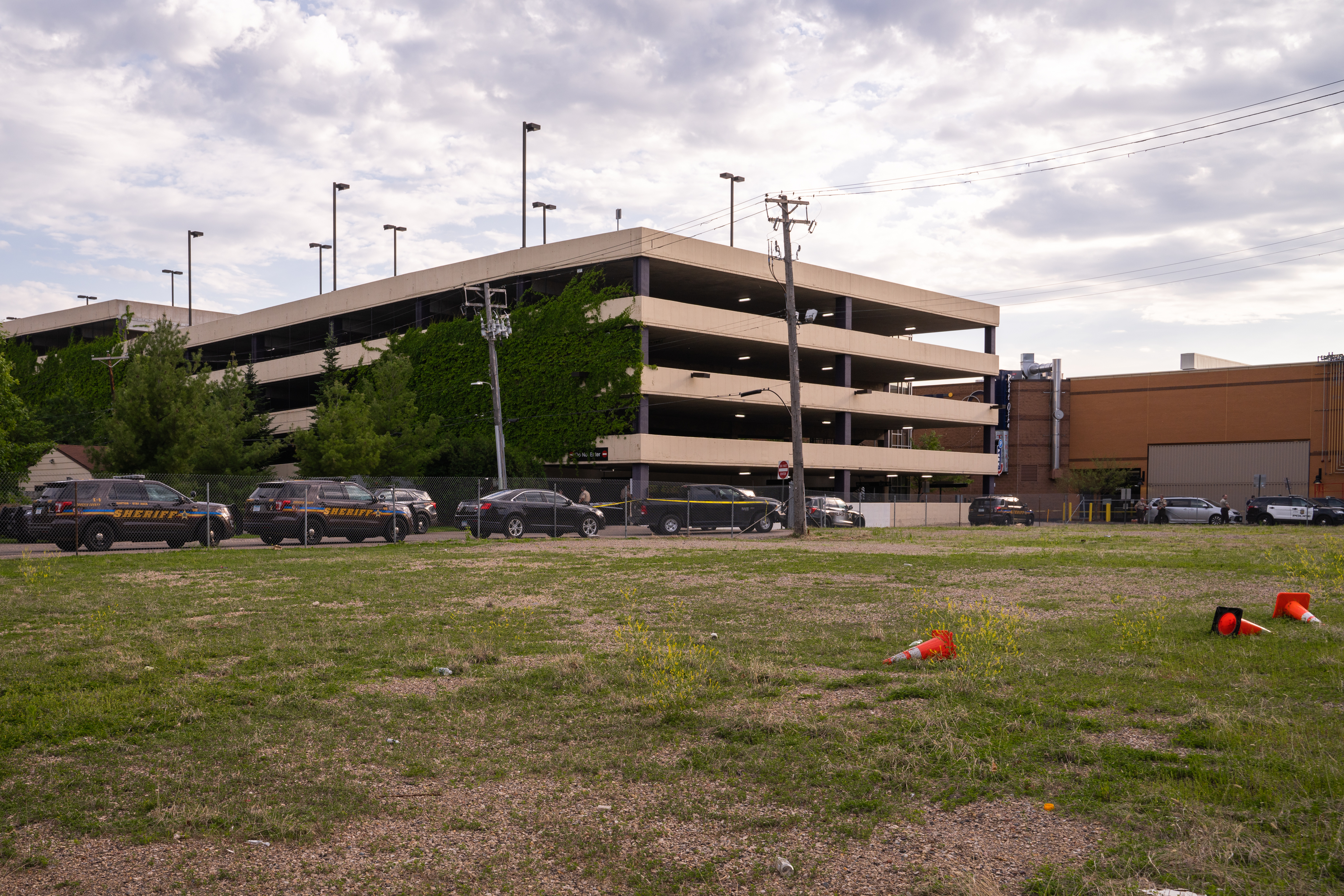
The parking ramp several hours after Smith was killed, June 3, 2021

On June 3, 2021, Smith had posted on Instagram that he was at Stella's Fish Café, a restaurant on West Lake Street, near Seven Points, in the Uptown neighborhood of Minneapolis. A Ramsey County sheriff's deputy who was monitoring Smith's social media accounts alerted the federal task force of Smith's whereabouts. At least nine task force officers took positions to watch Smith and attempt to apprehend him. Just after 2:00 p.m. CDT, the task force officers observed as Smith and Askar departed the restaurant and made their way to a Maserati vehicle atop a parking ramp near West Lake Street and Girard Avenue South. Smith and Askar were sitting inside the stationary vehicle when undercover law enforcement agents surrounded them in seven unmarked vehicles. The task force members activated their lights and sirens and used their vehicles to block the Maserati vehicle.

For several minutes, task force members in tactical gear repeatedly told Smith he was under arrest, to put his hands up, and exit the vehicle—commands that a citizen bystander overheard. Smith refused to comply and said to Askar that he did not want to go to jail and that he was going to die.

The officers attempted to break the windows of the Maserati to extract Smith. Smith, who had been holding a cellphone in an attempt to begin a Facebook livestream, dropped it and reached into the back seat to grab an item. According to law enforcement accounts of the incident, Smith then brandished a gun and fired it from inside his vehicle. At 2:08 p.m. CDT, the Hennepin County and Ramsey County officers fired fifteen rounds, striking Smith. Medical aid rendered at the scene was unsuccessful and Smith died at 2:11 p.m.

Askar was injured from flying glass and taken to Hennepin County Medical Center for treatment. No officers were injured.

== Civil unrest ==
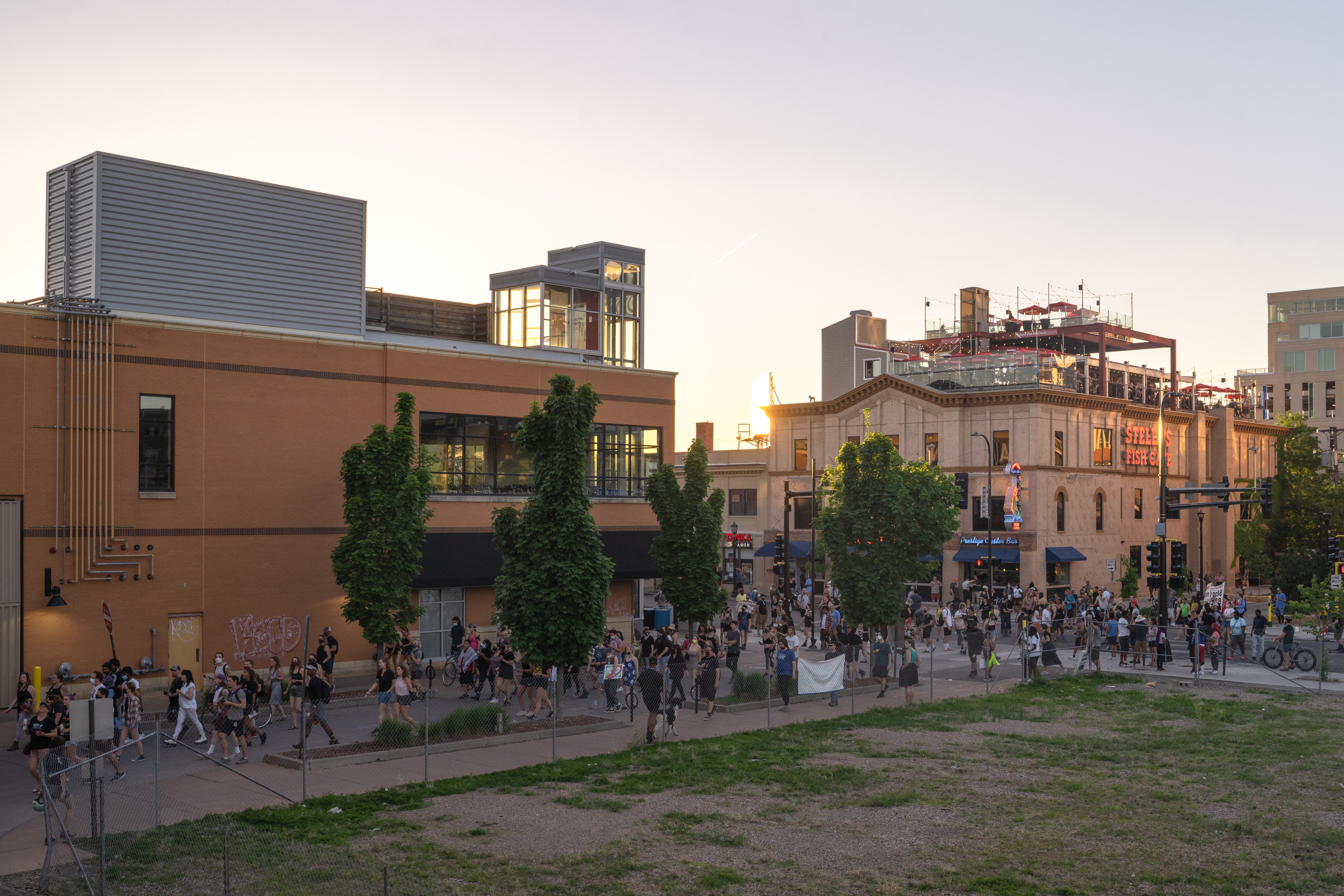
Protest march for Smith, June 4, 2021

=== Uptown protests and disorder ===
Protests began on June 3, 2021, and continued for several days, primarily in the Uptown area of Minneapolis. Minneapolis police made several arrests for looting and rioting during the overnight hours of June 3 and 4. Over the next several days, demonstrators intermittently held portions of West Lake Street near where Smith was killed by blocking the road to vehicular traffic with makeshift barriers, and city officials sent crews to remove barricades and reopen the street to vehicle traffic. Nightly demonstrations were held through mid July and unrest continued for several months. The slogans, “No Justice, No Street!” and "Winston Smith Was Assassinated”, were used by activists in reaction to Smith's death.

=== Vehicle-ramming attack ===
On June 13, 2021, Deona Marie Knajdek (also reported as Deona Marie Erickson), a protester, was killed and three others were injured when a vehicle rammed into a blockade at the intersection of West Lake Street and Girard Avenue. The driver, Nicholas Kraus, a 35-year old man from Saint Paul, Minnesota, pleaded guilty in late 2022 to the charges of unintentional murder for Knajdek's death and second-degree assault with a dangerous weapon for injuring another protester.

== Investigation ==
=== Minneapolis police response ===
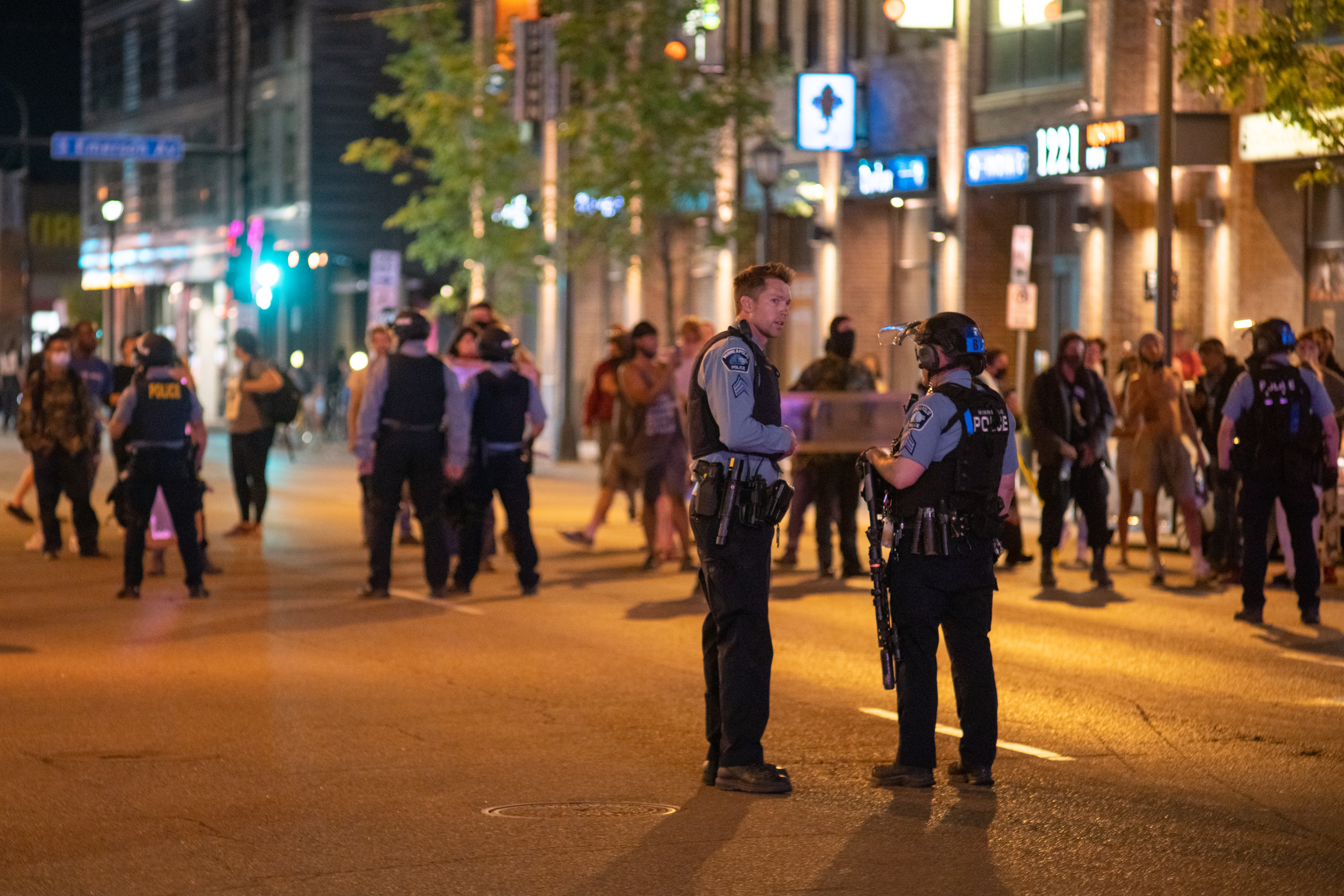
Minneapolis police officers and protesters on West Lake Street several hours after the incident, June 3, 2021.

Minneapolis police officers who arrived at the scene and were wearing body cameras interviewed Askar. In their video footage, Askar said she pleaded with Smith to put his hands up and comply with the officers, but he refused and said he did not want to go to jail and that he was going to die. She also gave a statement to Minnesota Bureau of Criminal Apprehension agents, when she said that the incident happened fast and that she did not remember seeing a gun in Smith's vehicle. Askar said she did not visually witness the shooting as she had ducked for cover, and she expressed confusion afterwards about whether a shooting had occurred.

=== Reaction by civil rights activists ===
Civil rights activists and Smith's friends and family disputed the law enforcement accounts of the incident. Smith's family held a press conference on June 4 outside the Minnesota Bureau of Criminal Apprehension building in Saint Paul to demanded greater law enforcement transparency and the release of any surveillance footage that might have captured the incident. Local organization Communities United Against Police Brutality held a separate press conference near the shooting site on June 4 to call for officials to release video footage and other details of the shooting.

=== Initial incident report ===
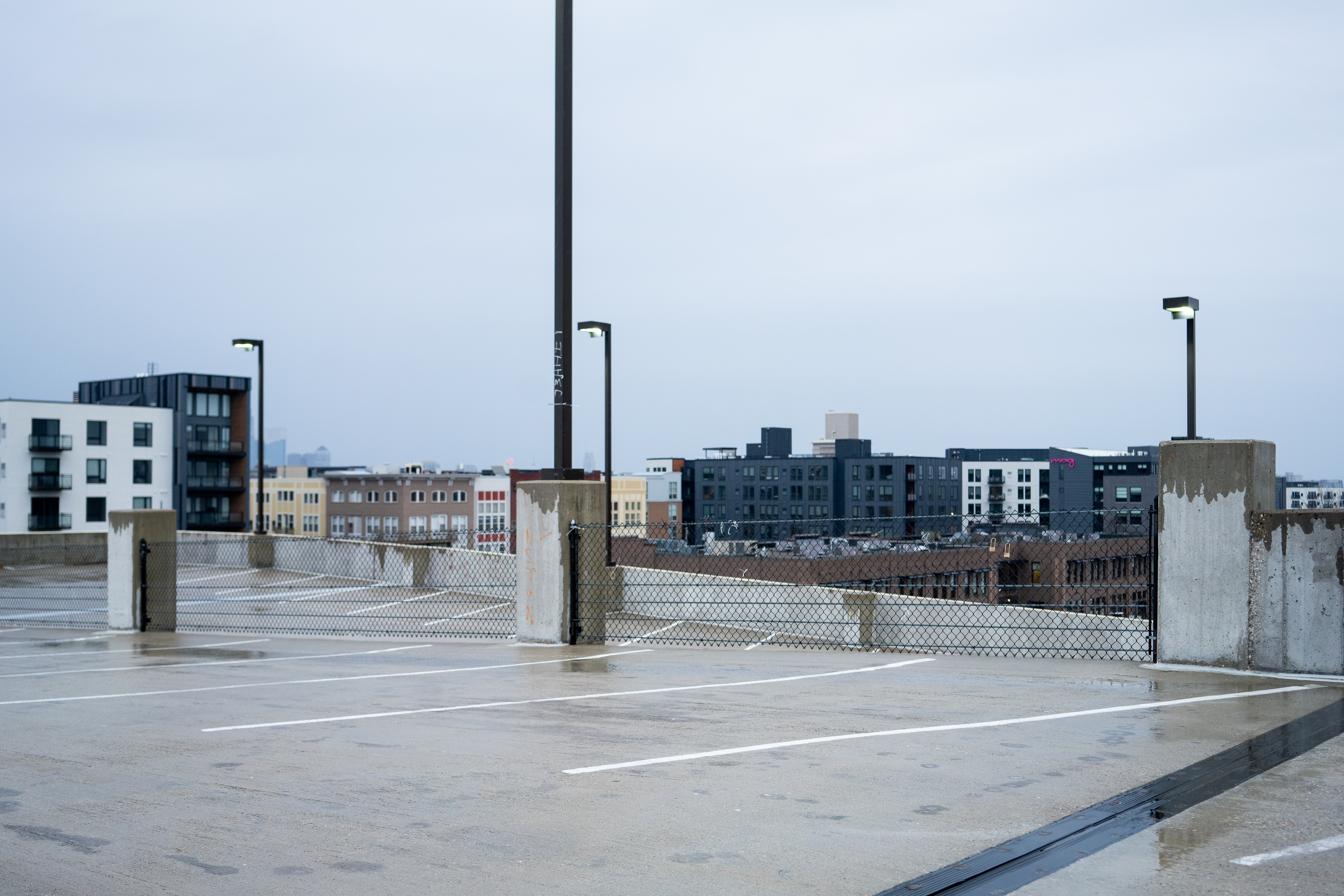
The top floor of the parking ramp were Smith was killed, 2022.

According to the U.S. Marshals Service in a statement they released soon after the incident, Smith had failed to comply with orders from apprehending officers, and that he produced a handgun, which resulted in the task force firing at him. The Minnesota Bureau of Criminal Apprehension (BCA) said in a preliminary report that Smith had fired a gun at the apprehending officers from inside of his vehicle, and that authorities recovered a handgun and spent ammunition cartridges from the driver's side of his vehicle. According to court documents and officer conduct report, investigators at the scene recovered from Smith's vehicle a Smith & Wesson M&P .380 handgun loaded with one live cartridge on the driver's side and six spent Blazer 380 Auto cartridge cases, as well as an empty gun magazine that was inside a duffel bag. Outside the passenger's side of Smith's vehicle, investigators recovered fifteen (another source says fourteen) FC 9mm Luger cartridge cases from where the officers had fired. Several bullet fragments were recovered from inside the vehicle.

=== Autopsy ===
An autopsy report issued by the medical examiner's office for Hennepin County ruled the manner of Smith's death, which occurred at 2:11 p.m. CDT on June 3, 2021, to be a homicide from multiple gunshot wounds. According to attorneys for Askar, the BCA did not take gunshot residue samples from Smith before his body was washed by the medical examiner, evidence they felt could exonerate Smith from the BCA claim that he possessed and fired a gun. The BCA said in response that it believed that such tests would have been inconclusive and opted instead for DNA testing and other examinations of the gun recovered in Smith's vehicle.

=== Bureau of Criminal Apprehension ===
In the immediate aftermath of the officer-involved shooting, per state law, the Minnesota Bureau of Criminal Apprehension (BCA) began an investigation of officer conduct. The officers who shot at Smith were placed on administrative leave, a standard protocol, pending further investigation. The BCA did not publicly name the officers who shot at Smith as Minnesota Statutes prevented release of undercover agents' identities. The BCA, whose agents had participated in past North Star Fugitive Task Force operations, said that it was not a participant in the Smith operation and that it did not believe it had conflict of interest in reviewing the case.

Activist Nekima Levy Armstrong led a 50-person protest on June 8, 2021, outside the suburban home of Minnesota's U.S. Marshal, Ramona Dohman, calling for her resignation. Armstrong alleged that Dohman, a Trump administration appointee, had a conflict of interest due to a past working relationship with the Minnesota Bureau of Criminal Apprehension.

Smith's family retained attorneys Benjamin Crump and Jeff Storms, who represented the family of George Floyd and helped obtain a $27 million wrongful death settlement from the city of Minneapolis. On June 10, 2021, attorneys for Askar, the passenger that was in Smith's car during the June 3 incident, said that she had never seen a firearm on Smith or in the vehicle, which contradicted the law enforcement account and the evidence the BCA said was found at the scene—a handgun and spent ammunition cartridges. Her attorneys said that the officers who approached the vehicle did not identify themselves and were not wearing uniforms. They also said according to Askar, Smith had a mobile phone in his hand and attempted to record a video via Facebook Live when officers fired upon the vehicle. The attorneys reiterated that she did not observe Smith with a gun, which contradicted the BCA's claim that they recovered a weapon and spent ammunition cartridges in the vehicle occupied by Smith. Smith's family and advocates challenged the BCA to produce more evidence to support their claims. In response, a spokesperson for the BCA said the agency stood by its earlier statements that evidence gathered at the scene supported their claim that Smith had fired a gun from inside the vehicle. Expressing her frustration with the investigation, Minneapolis city counselor Lisa Bender said on June 16, 2021, that preliminary information released by law enforcement about the incident was "incomplete and inconsistent".

By mid June 2021, the exact sequence of events during the June 3 encounter were unclear from the BCA's preliminary investigation. In search warrants filed in court, the BCA said that "at some point during the interaction, shots were fired". The BCA had not said who fired first in public statements about the incident. Investigators were aware that Smith had attempted to record a video on his cellphone during the arrest, but the BCA was unable to overcome the device's encryption to access the contents. The BCA completed its investigation of the shooting in July 2021.

=== Officer charging decision ===
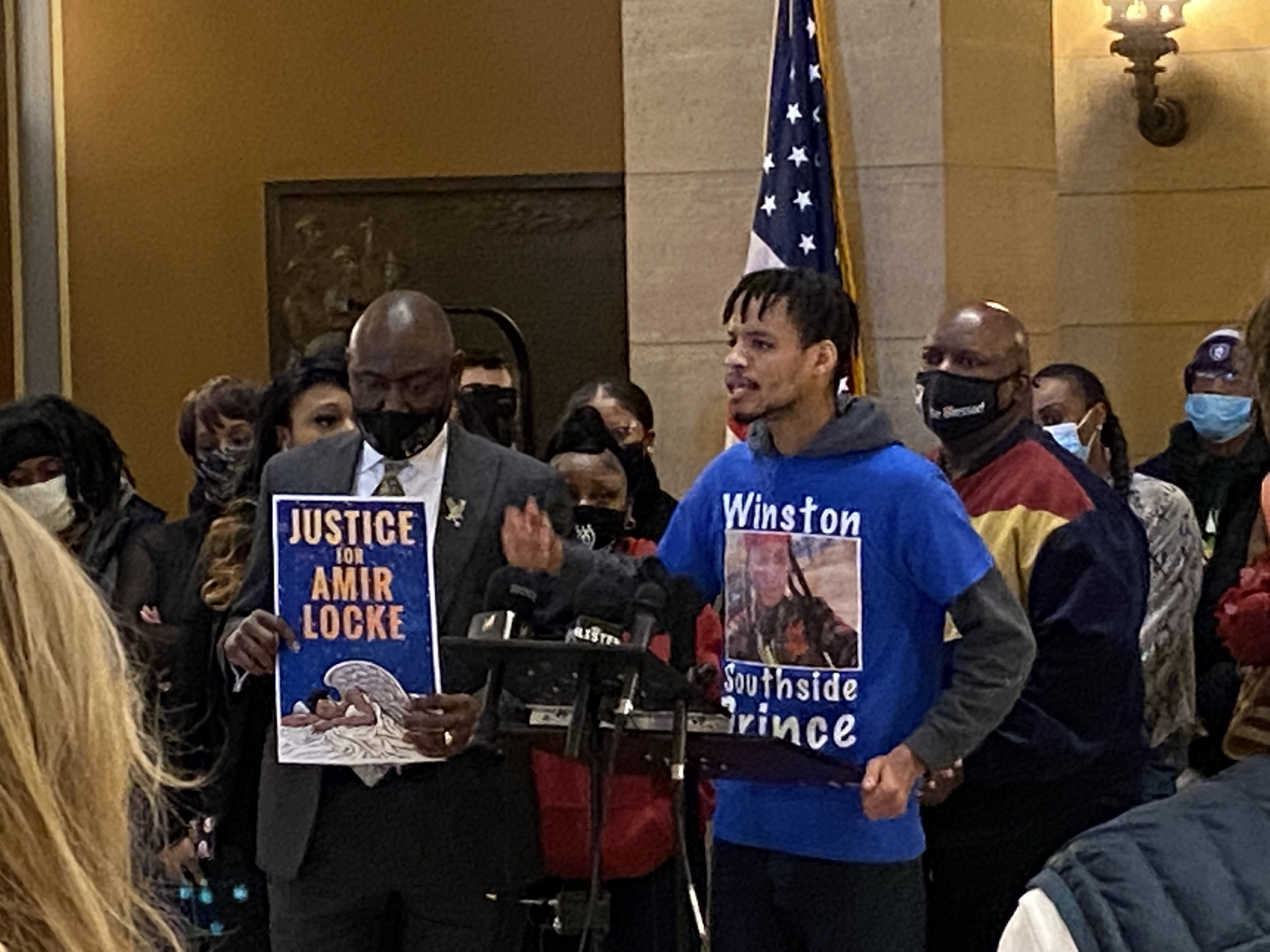
Press conference with the families of Amir Locke and Winston Smith, and attorney Benjamin Crump, at the Minnesota State Capitol, February 10, 2022.

The BCA sent the completed case to Crow Wing County attorney Donald Ryan to determine if the involved officers should face criminal charges. Though the shooting took place in Hennepin County, its attorney Michael O. Freeman sought another prosecutor who did not have a conflict of interest in the case from past work with involved law enforcement organizations and personnel.

Ryan's determination, released publicly on October 11, 2021, was that the use deadly force in this instance was lawful under Minnesota law and that no charges would be filed against the involved officers. Ryan's report said that Smith ignored law enforcement commands to exit his vehicle as agents attempted to arrest him, and while the officers were breaking windows to remove him from the vehicle, Smith dropped a cellphone he had been holding and reached for an object from the backseat. An officer observed Smith with a gun and opened fire, and another officer fired in reaction though they did not directly observe Smith with a gun. The report stated that Smith had fired his handgun six times from inside the vehicle during the incident. Smith's DNA was found on the gun and bullet fragments and other ballistic evidence support the law enforcement claim that Smith discharged it multiple times during the incident. Ryan was "unable to determine who fired first", but considered the matter "irrelevant" as Smith's actions to reach for and brandish a firearm constituted an initiation of a deadly force confrontation.

In response, attorneys for Winston Boogie Smith's family called for an independent investigation of the incident. Jaylani Hussein, the executive director of the Minnesota chapter of the Council on American-Islamic Relations, said on October 11, 2021, "There is absolutely no confidence that county prosecutors can fully bring forth justice against law enforcement."

=== Release of the case file ===
The BCA released its complete case file to the news media on October 20, 2021, that revealed new details about the case. The gun allegedly fired by Smith had been reported stolen out of Des Moines, Iowa. Investigators said they found the .380 handgun inside the vehicle Smith was driving along with a matching cartridge casing and damage inside the vehicle, which indicated that Smith had fired the weapon at some point. The involved officers declined to be interviewed in person by the BCA and instead submitted written statements of their accounts of what happened.

== Controversies ==
=== Media misinformation ===
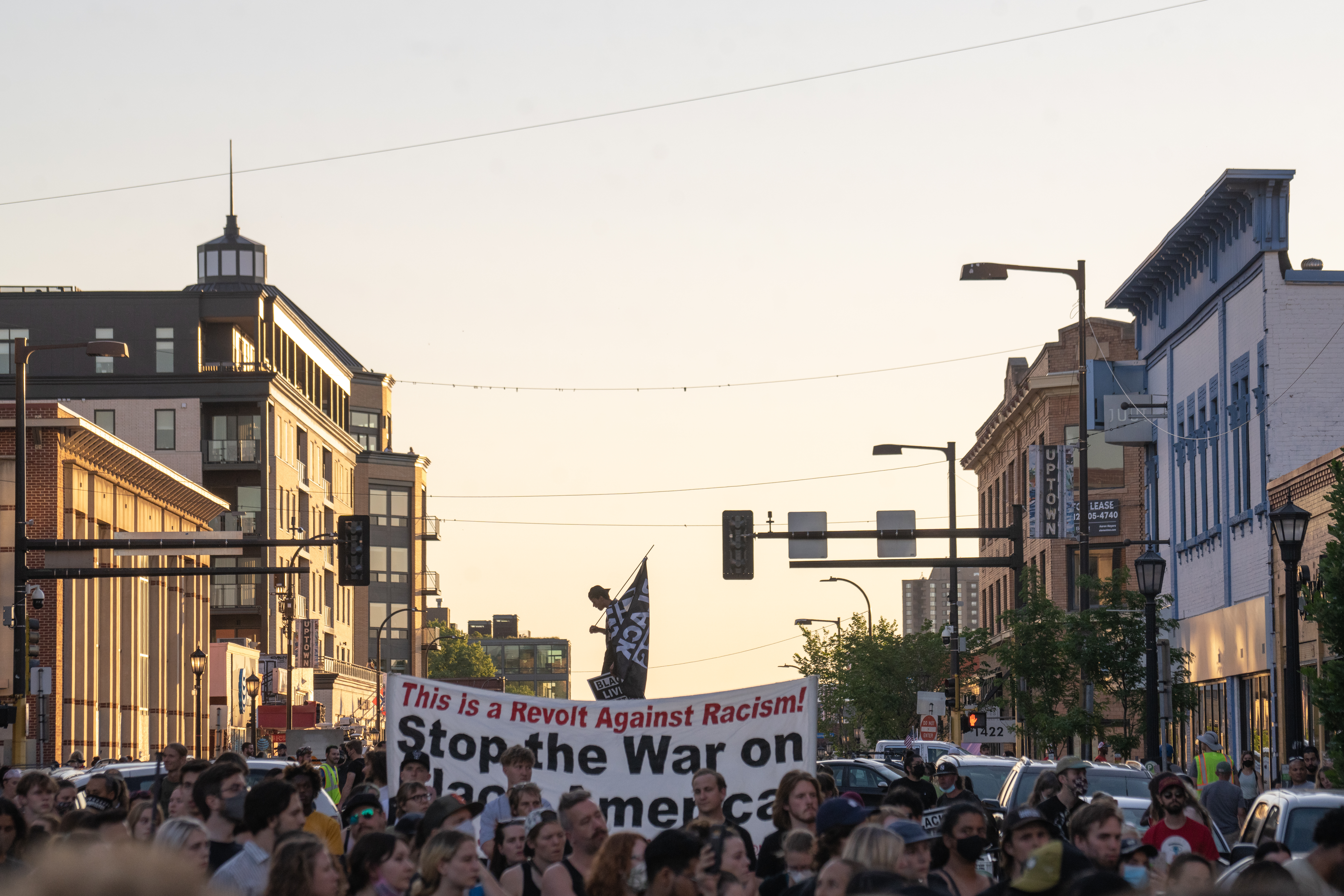
Protest march in Minneapolis on June 14, 2021

Initial reports by police scanners and a story by the Star Tribune said law enforcement had shot and killed a "murder suspect," a detail that was later proved false. The newspaper retracted the error five days later and apologized. The false "murder suspect" claim was compared to the Minneapolis Police Department's initial statement in May 2020 that mischaracterized George Floyd's murder as a "medical incident". The inaccurate report reportedly led to further public distrust in the days after Smith's death. Local activist Nekima Levy Armstrong said in an opinion article published by the Minnesota Spokesman-Recorder on June 16, 2021, that the false characterization by the Star Tribune represented a pattern of "demonization of Black victims of police violence".

=== Lack of body cameras ===
Skepticism of the law enforcement account persisted with the absence of corroborating video footage in the immediate aftermath of the incident and during the investigation. The parking ramp operator said there was no surveillance video of the incident as any cameras were pointed at entrances and stairwells. There was no video footage from the police body camera or dashcam of the incident. Local law enforcement agencies said there was no body camera or dashcam footage of the incident because they were assisting U.S. Marshals. The U.S. Marshals Services formerly prohibited local law enforcement authorities who assisted them from using body or dash cameras, though the guidance was updated in October 2020 to permit camera use during arrest or search operations. According to a spokesman for the Minnesota Department of Public Safety, the Marshals Service had not yet phased in using cameras as allowed by the policy change.

Ramsey County Sheriff Bob Fletcher accused the Marshals Service of having been "misleading in their public comments to the media" about policies regarding the usage of body cameras. He said the county had repeatedly asked to use body cameras but was denied as recently as May 25, 2021. He said the Marshals Service changed their policy to allow body camera usage on June 4, 2021, the day after Smith was killed, but still would not allow cameras "until the onboarding process goes on." Following the shooting, the Hennepin, Ramsey, and Anoka county sheriff's offices announced they would suspend participation in the federal task force over the body camera issue. The former policy preventing body camera use by local police officers was a reason that police departments for Minneapolis and Saint Paul stopped allowing officers to assist the Fugitive Task Force's operations in recent years. Minneapolis Mayor Jacob Frey said on June 15, 2021, that the Minneapolis Police Department would not assist any multi-agency law enforcement operation prohibiting using officer cameras. A racial justice group led by Nekima Levy Armstrong also called on Minnesota Governor Tim Walz to prohibit local agencies from participating in U.S. Marshals' task force operations.

After facing public criticism for the lack of law enforcement officer accountability in Smith's case, the U.S. Department of Justice announced on June 7, 2021, that federal agents would be required to wear body cameras for warranted arrests and searches of buildings in a reversal of a longstanding policy. Deputy U.S. Attorney General Lisa Monaco ordered the heads of the Marshals Service, FBI, Drug Enforcement Administration (DEA), and the Bureau of Alcohol, Tobacco, Firearms and Explosives (ATF) to create body camera policies within 30 days.

The incident led to broader adoption of body camera usage in the United States and Minnesota. The U.S. Department of Justice began a phased program to implement body camera usage and requested that Congress provide more funding to equip all agents. In 2021, the Minnesota Legislature provided $600,000 to equip BCA officers with body cameras, and the Minnesota Department of Public Safety began a $500,000 grant program to equip smaller law enforcement agencies in the state with body cameras.

== Aftermath ==
=== Memorials ===
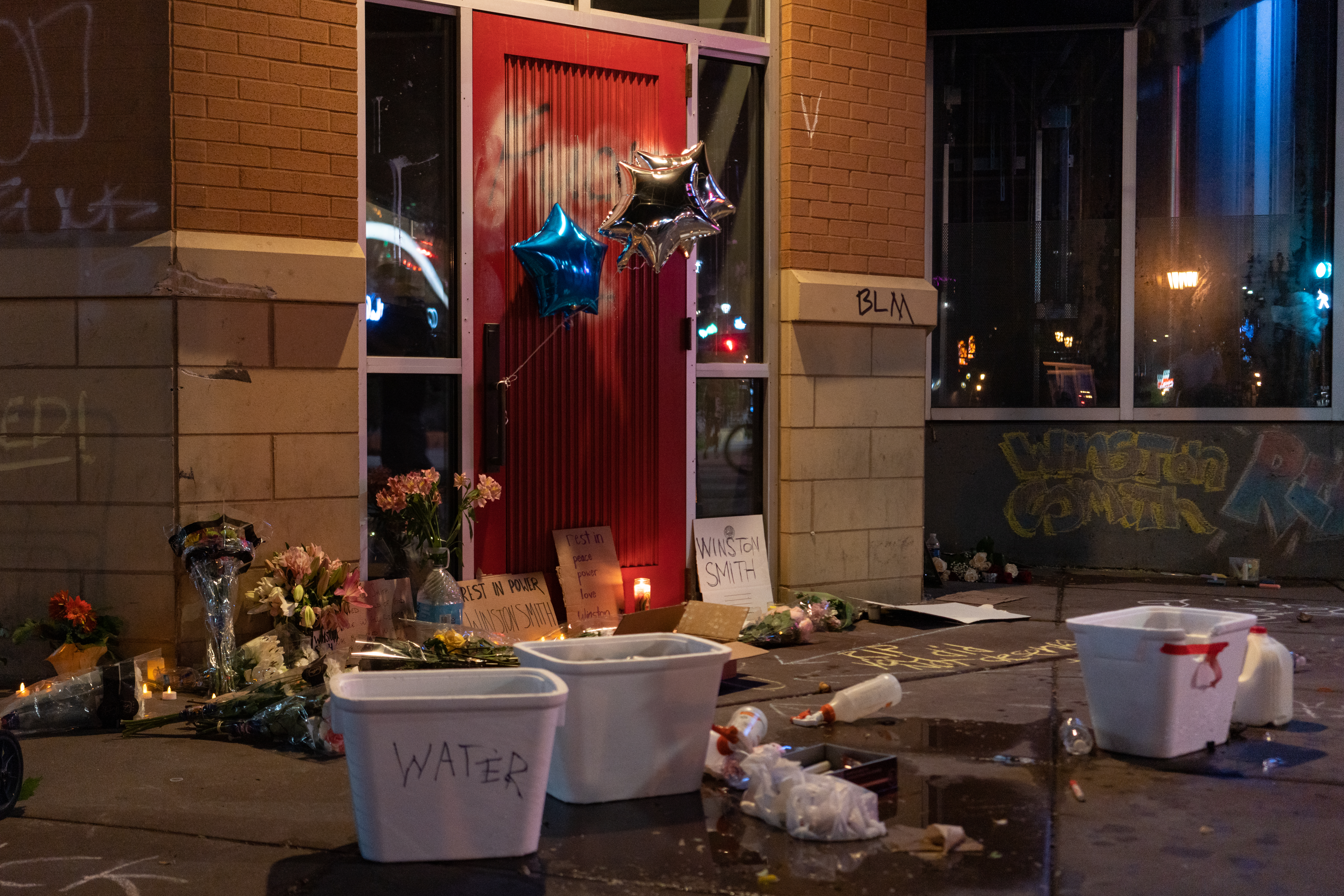
Tributes left for Smith at the parking ramp entrance, June 4, 2021.

Family and friends of Smith held a vigil the evening of June 4 at the parking ramp where he was killed. The funeral for Smith was held at Shiloh Temple on West Broadway in Minneapolis on June 12. Smith was buried at Crystal Lake Cemetery in Minneapolis.

=== Passenger case dismissed ===
Askar filed a lawsuit in Hennepin County District Court seeking $50,000 in relief for injuries sustained by shattered glass from gunshots fired by law enforcement officers. Attorneys for Askar also notified the U.S. Marshals Service of impending civil actions using the Federal Tort Claims Act for pursuit of $15 million in compensation. U.S. District Court Judge David S. Doty dismissed Askar's lawsuit in May 2022.

=== Smith's cellphone video ===
Civil attorneys for Smith and Askar hired a private investigator in mid-2023 to examine Smith's cellphone, which the BCA had given to the Hennepin County Sheriff's Office in late 2021, to try to find additional evidence. The Star Tribune reported on October 5, 2023, that the private investigator was able to recover a 35-second video that Smith filmed during the June 3, 2021, incident. According to the newspaper's sources who viewed it, Smith began recording on his cellphone as the officers were attempting to extract him from the vehicle. Smith ignored the advice of the other passenger to surrender and he retrieved a handgun from the vehicle's center console and began to raise it when he was shot. Minnesota Public Radio reported that those who viewed it said it captured Smith exchanging gunfire with the officers. The video was released to the public by the Hennepin County Attorney's Office on February 14, 2025, which confirmed earlier media accounts of what happened.

=== Second review ===
After reviewing Smith's cellphone video, Hennepin County Attorney Mary Moriarty declined to prosecute the law enforcement officers who killed Smith.

== See also ==
- List of killings by law enforcement officers in Minnesota
- The Marshall Project
- United States racial unrest (2020–2023)
