= Minneapolis ICE shooting =

Minneapolis ICE shooting may refer to:

- Killing of Renée Good on January 7, 2026
- Non-fatal shooting of Julio Cesar Sosa-Celis on January 14, 2026
- Killing of Alex Pretti on January 24, 2026

== See also ==
- List of immigration raids and arrests in the second Trump presidency
- List of killings by law enforcement officers in Minnesota
- Lists of killings by law enforcement officers in the United States
