= Killing of Dolal Idd =

Police shooting of a man in Minneapolis

- Part of 2020–2023 Minneapolis–Saint Paul racial unrest
- A Minneapolis police officer approaching a vehicle driven by Dolal Idd with a fire arm drawn, as shown by body camera footage, December 30, 2020
- Shooting location in Minneapolis.
- Date: December 30, 2020
- Time: c. 6:15 pm (CDT)
- Venue: Holiday gas station parking lot
- Location: Minneapolis, Minnesota, United States; 44.938406°N 93.247698°W
- Type: Sting operation
- Cause: Weapons investigation
- Filmed by: Police body camera
- Participants: Dolal Idd and a female passenger in a white sedan; Officers Darcy Klund, Paul Huynh, and Jason Schmitt of the Minneapolis Police Department
- Outcome: Shot fired at officers; Police returned fire
- Deaths: Dolal B. Idd
- Inquiries: Bureau of Criminal Apprehension, preliminary report January 4, 2021.; Dakota County deadly force review, final report August 6, 2021.
- Charges: No charges; officer force justified
- Footage: minneapolismn.gov/police/records/frequent

Dolal Idd was a 23-year-old Somali-American man who was killed in an exchange of gunfire with Minneapolis police officers at approximately 6:15 p.m. CST on December 30, 2020, after he shot at them from inside the car he was driving. The fatal encounter happened in the U.S. state of Minnesota during a police sting operation.

Minneapolis police were investigating Idd for illegal possession and sale of firearms. Idd was prohibited from possessing firearms as part of his probation from a prior felony conviction. A confidential police informant intermediated as a buyer for a semi-automatic pistol, and made arrangements for a buyer to purchase the gun from Idd so that police officers could arrest him. Video captured by a police body camera the evening of December 30 showed police officers attempting to arrest Idd who struck several police vehicles with the car he was driving. After the vehicle driven by Idd was blocked by several police vehicles to prevent escape, Idd fired a handgun from inside the car he was driving through a rolled up window that shattered outward and hit a police vehicle containing several police officers. Minneapolis police officers Paul Huynh, Darcy Klund, and Jason Schmit returned several rounds of gunfire, killing Idd at the scene.

The shooting on December 30, 2020, took place in the parking lot of a busy Holiday gas station at the intersection of Cedar Avenue and East 36th Street in the Powderhorn Park neighborhood of Minneapolis, one mile (1.6 km) from the location where George Floyd was murdered by a Minneapolis police officer on May 25, 2020. Floyd's murder resulted in prolonged local unrest and worldwide protests. Idd's death was the first killing by a Minneapolis police officer since that of Floyd. The December 30, 2020, shooting affected the local community still in mourning over Floyd's murder seven months prior, and reignited local debate over police brutality and race relations. In several rallies, protesters questioned the police narrative of the December 30 incident and if police officers could have used better de-escalation tactics to prevent an exchange of gunfire.

In the vehicle driven by Idd, law enforcement investigators recovered a pistol and two spent ammunition cartridges on the driver's side, as well as a backpack on the passenger's side that contained ammunition and a Leinad PM-11 machine pistol, the type of gun a confidential police informant arranged to purchase from Idd. The Minneapolis police, citing video footage and witness statements from the incident, said officers returned fire in response to an initial shot by a civilian. The Minnesota Bureau of Criminal Apprehension opened an investigation of the officer-involved shooting. The bureau's preliminary report, issued on January 4, 2021, said that Idd struck several police vehicles with the car he was driving and that he had shot his gun first before police returned fire.

Minneapolis police officers Huynh, Klund, and Schmit fired their weapons at Idd during the December 30 incident. Investigators at the scene recovered six bullets and seven bullet fragments from the rounds that the officers fired at Idd. An autopsy report classified Idd's death as a homicide, due to multiple gunshot wounds. The conduct of the officers, and if they were legally justified in using force, was reviewed by the Dakota County attorney's office. The final charging decision memorandum it released on August 6, 2021, said the officers' actions were justified and that no criminal charges would be filed against them.

== Background ==
=== Fatal police shootings in Minnesota ===
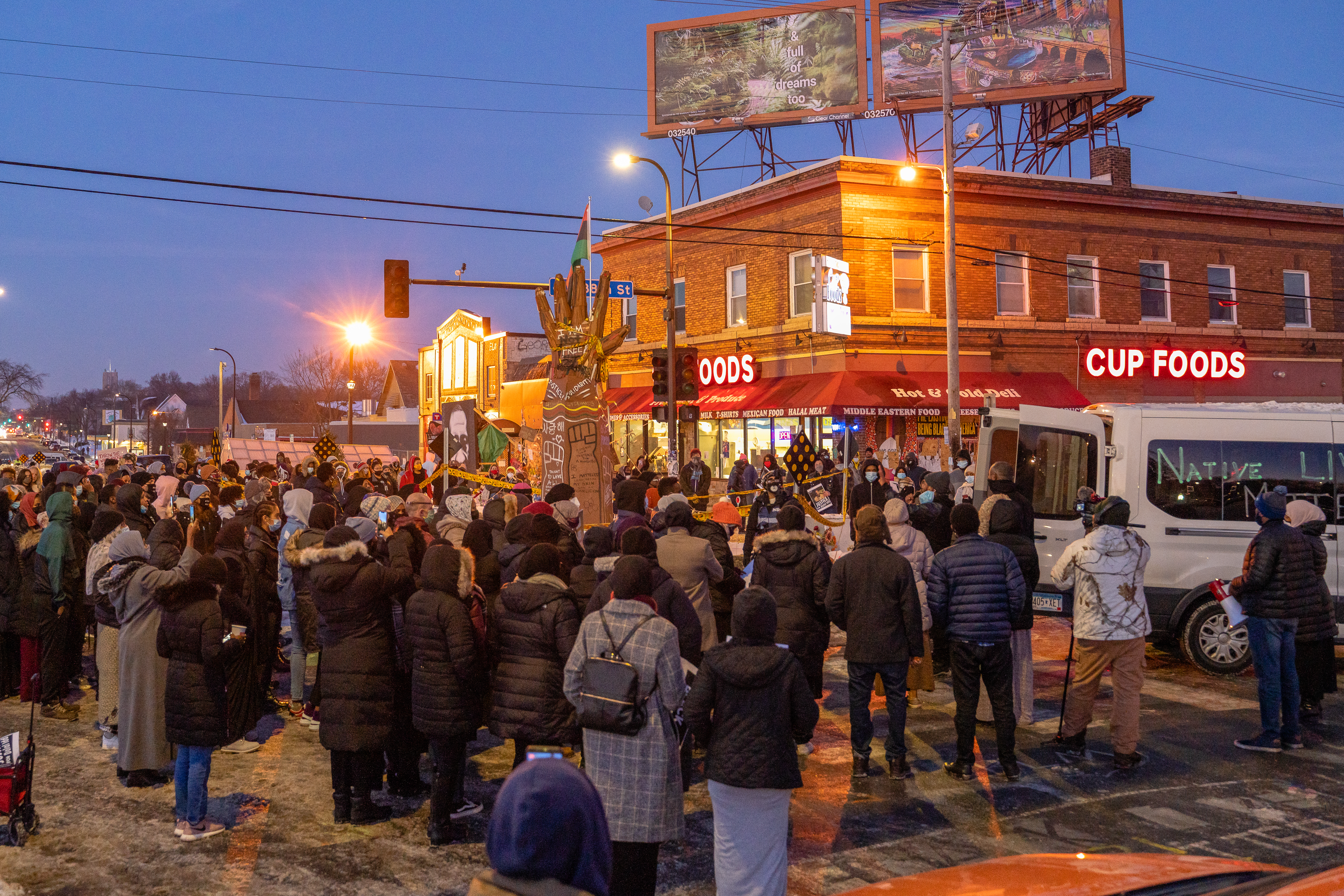
Dolal Idd protest march at George Floyd Square in Minneapolis, January 3, 2021.

Idd's death provoked a strong reaction in the local community as it was reminiscent of recent, fatal police encounters, particularly the shootings of black men. Minneapolis police had shot at people 17 different times from 2015 to the end of 2019, killing a person in five circumstances, most notably Jamar Clark, a black man, in 2015 and Justine Damond, a white woman, in 2017. In the Minneapolis suburb of Falcon Heights in 2016, a police officer from another nearby suburb, St. Anthony, shot and killed Philando Castile, a black man, during a traffic stop.

=== Murder of George Floyd and the aftermath ===
Idd's death came as Minneapolis officials attempted to reform the city's policing policies in the aftermath of the murder of George Floyd, an unarmed black man, by a white Minneapolis police officer on May 25, 2020. Officials were also addressing a wave of violent crime that followed widespread civic unrest in late May and early June 2020 after Floyd's murder. Idd's death was the 83rd homicide in the city in 2020, a number that eclipsed the previous two years combined. The Powderhorn Park area that featured the George Floyd Square, a street intersection that protesters transformed to an "autonomous zone", had been the location of several violent crimes since Floyd's murder and authorities had investigated firearm dealers that used the barricaded area as cover for illicit activities.

== People involved ==
=== Dolal Idd ===
Dolal Bayle Idd (July 18, 1997 – December 30, 2020) was born in Somalia to parents from Kebri Dehar, a city in the Somali region of Ethiopia. His father resettled in the United States from Somalia in 1997, the same year Dolal Idd was born. Dolal Idd was three-years old when he emigrated with other family from Somalia to the United States. The family first resided in San Diego, California, and then moved to the Minneapolis–Saint Paul metropolitan area, first residing in the suburb of New Hope, to be near extended family who already lived there. The Idd family had 11 children, including Dolal Idd. Idd resided in the Minneapolis suburb of Eden Prairie for most of his adolescent years. In 2015, Idd graduated from Eden Prairie High School according to the Sahan Journal or Minnetonka High School according to the Star Tribune.

After high school, Idd travelled with the family to Ethiopia and stayed there for several months. In 2016, Idd had briefly enrolled at Normandale Community College in Bloomington, Minnesota, for the spring semester, and he hoped to study computers or pursue a career as an emergency medical technician. He was also interested in learning more about Islam and the family discussed sending him to Egypt to study the Quran and the Arabic language.

Idd accumulated a criminal record in Minnesota over in next few years that included seven misdemeanors and a felony conviction. In 2018, Idd received jail time on three occasions. In 2019, Idd was jailed for several charges, including that he committed theft, carried a firearm without a permit, possessed marijuana, fled a police officer, and committed credit card fraud. As part of a plea agreement, Idd agreed to live at a residential drug treatment center, and spent three months there in 2019. In October 2020, Idd was booked into a Bloomington city jail on felony suspicion of a stolen vehicle.

Idd's most prominent criminal case was a July 2018 incident when he accidentally fired a gun in a shower of his parents' home as two children slept nearby. At the time of the incident, family members said that Idd was not allowed in the house as he scared the young children who lived there, and he was believed to have broken in through the basement patio door late at night. Idd fled the house after the gun discharged, leaving behind a box of bullets and a gun magazine. Police arrested him a few hours later when responding to a suspicious vehicle in a parking lot in Bloomington, Minnesota. Idd was found asleep in the vehicle and in possession of drug paraphernalia and a loaded Smith & Wesson 9 mm handgun that had been reported stolen out of North Dakota. Idd was eventually charged in October 2018 and he pled guilty in a Hennepin County court in 2019 of illegally possessing and firing a gun. Idd was sentenced to time already served in jail and placed on probation, and was ordered by the judge not to possess firearms. The probationary period had nearly finished at the time of his death.

The 23-year old Dolal Idd's last known address was his parents' home in Eden Prairie, a suburb of Minneapolis, approximately 13 miles from the city's downtown area. Idd's girlfriend said she had been to the family's Eden Prairie home and that Idd lived in the basement. Family members said that Idd moved out of the family's house in early December after his brother, Mohamed Idd, was arrested and charged with second-degree murder in connection to a fatal shooting at an apartment complex in Bloomington, Minnesota, that occurred at 5:30 a.m. on November 30, 2020. According to police investigators, surveillance video also showed that Dolal Idd had been at the same apartment complex a few hours prior to that shooting.

After his death, friends and family of Dolal Idd commented about the period of time proceeding his death. They said that he was trying to turn his life around, that he had difficulty securing a job due to prior criminal convictions, and that he was seeing a therapist weekly. They also said that Idd had become increasingly paranoid about the police and fearful that he was being followed. After moving out of his family's home in early December 2020, Idd stayed with a friend, but he left after a couple of weeks. Idd was staying at a hotel in Bloomington, Minnesota, in the days leading up to his death.

=== Passenger ===
An adult, female passenger owned the white Chevrolet Cobalt vehicle Idd was driving during the December 30, 2020 incident. She sat in the passenger's seat as Idd exchanged gunfire with Minneapolis police officers. She identified as his girlfriend.

=== Minneapolis police officers ===
The Minneapolis police officers who fired at Idd during the December 30 incident were Paul Huynh, Darcy Klund, and Jason Schmitt. By the time of the shooting, Huynh had been with the police department for six years, Schmitt for 23 years, and Klund for 33 years. The three officers were members of a community response team that focused on issues such as drugs and street-level crimes, and had been investigating an increase in carjackings in Minneapolis. Klund was the sergeant in charge of the team. Prior to the December 30 incident, the officers had several civilian complaints against them; Huynh had seven, Klund four, and Schmitt 24. None of the officers were disciplined for the complaints.

Schmitt received a Medal of Honor for his role as a responder to the I-35W Mississippi River bridge collapse in 2007. In 2014 the police department settled a misconduct lawsuit for $7,000 stemming from a 2007 incident involving Schmitt; he was accused of striking a man with his rifle during an arrest. None of the complaints against Schmitt considered by internal affairs or civilian review resulted in discipline.

Early in his career, Klund was reprimanded for berating another officer and he was temporarily demoted from being a sergeant until he was reinstated by an arbitration process. In a separate instance, he was praised for quick response and showing respect to the family of a homicide victim. In mid 2020, Klund was one of several city police officers that signed a public letter that condemned the murder of George Floyd and pledged to improve community trust.

Hunyh, the newest member of the team, had been reviewed eight times by internal affairs since 2014; none of the reviews resulted in discipline. He received a few awards for his role investigating robberies.

== Shooting ==
=== Sting operation ===
A confidential informant, who had been working with the Minneapolis police for over 20 years, became aware of a person on December 21, 2020, who was attempting to sell an AR-15 style rifle. Upon passing the information to Klund and the community response team, police investigators looked up the unidentified seller's mobile phone number records and discovered the seller had daily communication with Mohammed Idd, an inmate at the Hennepin County jail. The AR-15 was sold to an unknown party before police investigators could take any action. The confidential informant learned that the seller was also in possession of a MAC-10-style semiautomatic pistol that could be acquired and that the seller went by “Bird”, a nickname investigators had associated with Dolal Idd from previous investigations, and who was the brother of Mohammed Idd.

The Minneapolis Police Department attempted a sting operation the evening of December 30, 2020. The confidential informant led Idd to believe that they were intermediating for another unknown person who would buy the MAC-10-style gun that Idd wanted to sell, and the confidential informant and Idd communicated via mobile phone. Idd's attempt to sell a firearm was illegal, and a state law prohibited Idd from possessing a firearm because of a prior felony conviction, circumstances the Minneapolis police were aware of as they attempted to arrest Idd.

Idd, who the evening of December 30 was departing Hopkins, Minnesota, said he would meet the unknown buyer in the parking lot of a Holiday Stationstores in Minneapolis near the intersection of East 36th Street and Cedar Avenue. The gasoline and convenience store, situated in a residential neighborhood, was one of the busiest in the area. Idd said he would arrive there in a white Chevy vehicle and sent livestreaming videos of the MAC-10-style gun via mobile phone to the confidential informant. The informant said the unknown buyer would be meet him at the Holiday gas station in a vehicle with a description that matched the black Ford Explorer vehicle that Klund would covertly use for the sting operation.

Schmitt arrived at the Holiday gas station at approximately 5:45 p.m. CST in an unmarked Chrysler Pacifica minivan while three other police squad cars were staged in a nearby alley. Huynh was in a marked squad car. Klund and two other officers were inside an unmarked, black Ford Explorer squad car. At the direction of the police, the confidential informant did not go to the arranged meeting place.

=== Vehicle encounter ===
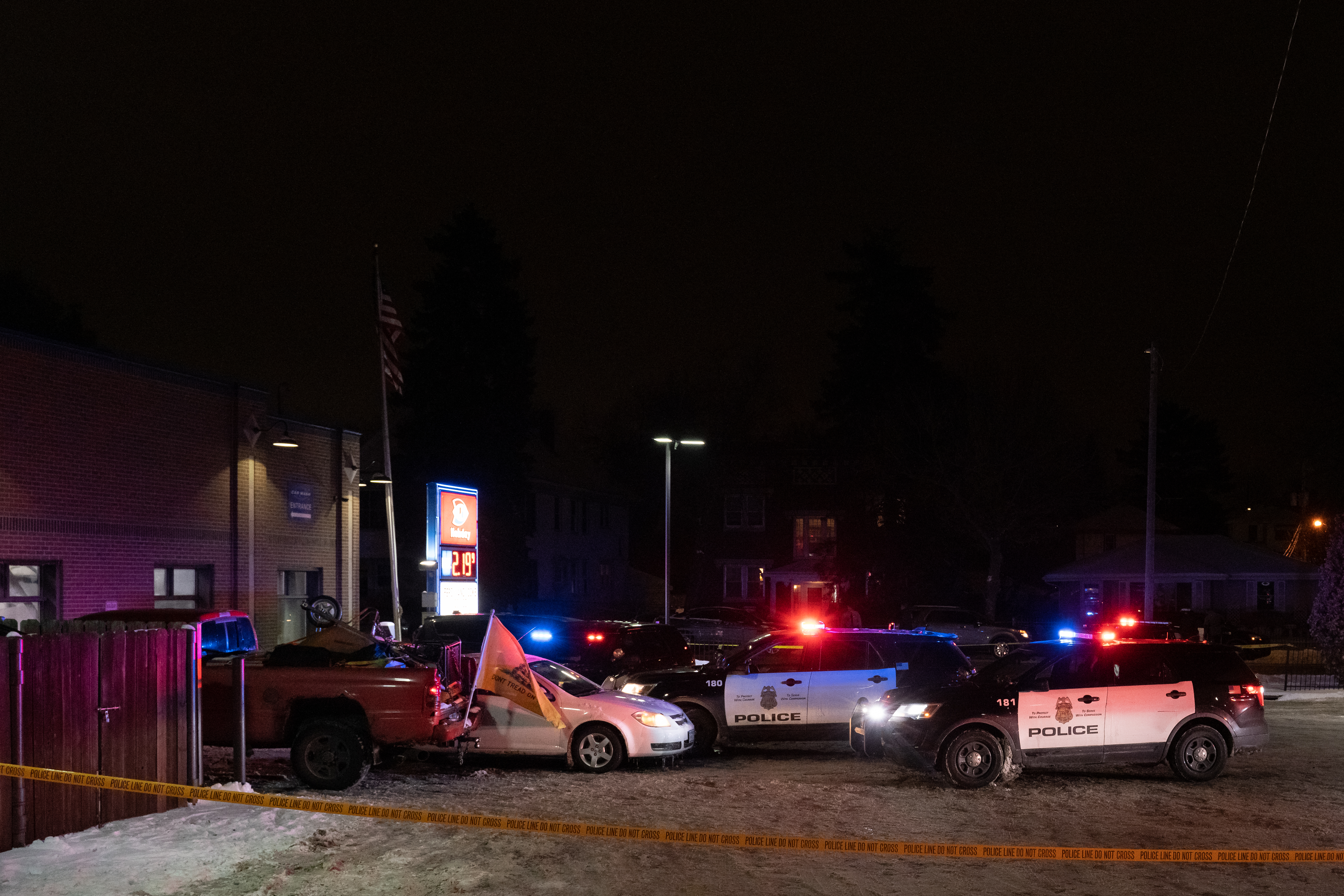
The secured crime scene in Minneapolis on December 30, 2020. Idd and a woman were in the white vehicle.

At 6:13 p.m. CST, Idd arrived at the Holiday gas station parking lot in a white Chevrolet Cobalt, a sedan-style automobile, with a woman in the passenger's seat. Idd parked near a car wash building at the north end of the station parking lot, next to an uninvolved red pickup truck and two spots away from Schmitt's vehicle. At approximately 6:15 p.m. CST, Minneapolis police officers—who had claimed "probable cause" in a weapons investigation and suspected that the driver had a weapon—moved in on the white vehicle driven by Idd in the parking lot. Huynh approached Idd's vehicle and activated the siren and emergency lights of the marked squad car, as Klund entered the parking lot and activated the unmarked Ford Explorer squad car's emergency lights, and parked his vehicle to block the Cobalt.

In a chaotic scene captured on video, three police squad cars with lights flashing converged on the white Cobalt vehicle. Huynh exited his vehicle and approached the white vehicle on foot with his gun drawn. Huynh identified himself as police and called for Idd to "stop your car!" Schmitt also approach on foot with his firearm drawn and yelled, "Hands up! Hands up!"

Two marked police cars had lights flashing and blocked the front of the white Cobalt driven by Idd by forming a "V" shape. The white Cobalt drove forward and struck the two marked police vehicles, causing visible damage. When Idd attempted to go in reverse, the white vehicle's tires struggled for traction as the parking lot was covered in snow, and a third unmarked police vehicle—the black Ford Explorer driven by Klund with its emergency lights activated—moved in further to box the white vehicle and prevent Idd from escaping. One officer yelled to the other offices to be aware that a passenger was also in the car with Idd.

After Idd ignored repeated commands from the police to put his hands up and exit the vehicle, he raised up a handgun and pointed it at the black Ford Explorer containing Klund and two other police officers and shot through his the driver's side window of the Cobalt that was rolled-up, which shattered the glass outward with a puff of smoke, and struck the Ford Explorer's hood, which indicated that Idd fired at the officers. One officer then yelled, "Fuck!" Another officer that approached the vehicle ducked for cover. Klund immediately exited the Ford Explorer and drew his firearm. Two seconds later, Huynh, Klund, and Schmitt returned a total of 14 rounds of gunfire.

=== Result of the shooting ===
Idd died at the scene. The woman in the passenger's seat of the white vehicle was unharmed. No police officers were injured.

=== Items recovered ===
Law enforcement investigators recovered a black-and-silver colored 45-caliber handgun in the white Cobalt vehicle driven by Idd that was located between Idd's body and the vehicle's center console and two spent 45-caliber cartridges inside, one on the driver's side floor and one on the driver's seat.

Investigators recovered six bullets and seven bullet fragments that had been fired by the three police officers.

The Bureau of Criminal Apprehension reported that a MAC-10 assault-style gun was also found in the vehicle driven by Idd; the actual gun model was a MAC-10 variant known as Leinad PM-11. Authorities recovered the Leinad PM-11 and ammunition in a backpack on the passenger's side.

== Search of the Idd family home ==
=== Probable cause ===
Soon after the shooting, the Bureau of Criminal Apprehension transported the woman passenger of the white vehicle to Minneapolis City Hall and interviewed her there. She said she was Idd's girlfriend and that she knew him only as "Bird", a nickname known to authorities from past investigations, and that she had been with Idd to his family's home in Eden Prairie. The confidential informant who attempted to purchase a gun from Dolal Idd told authorities that Idd had retrieved the MAC-10 he was attempting to sell from his home in Eden Prairie. Authorities used both sources of information to establish probable cause for a search of Idd's home in Eden Prairie for firearms, ammunition, and other materials. When the authorities looked up Idd's address, they found that police had been called to the house several times before for weapons offenses and that Idd had a history of possessing stolen firearms. Officials felt it was necessary to search the home overnight before evidence could potentially be destroyed or moved.

Before they initiated a search of the home, Bureau of Criminal Apprehension agents spoke with the Eden Prairie Police Department, who had a history with Idd and home. Eden Prairie police had responded to 19 different incidents with Idd and had 27 calls to the home over the past six years. Dolal Idd was convicted of firing a gun in the basement of the same home, previously. Two of Idd's brothers who had lived at the home were also the subject of recent law enforcement actions. At the time of the search, Idd's 26-year-old brother, Mohamed Idd, was being held in a Hennepin County jail on a $1 million bond for a murder charge related to a November 30, 2020, incident in Bloomington, Minnesota, in which he shot and killed another person with a firearm he possessed illegally. Another brother, Dalal Bayle Idd, a 25-year old, was by the date of the home search in the fifth year of a prison sentence for robbery and assault of a person at a Life Time Fitness gym in Eden Prairie, and for breaking into a random home in Bloomington, Minnesota and assaulting the homeowner in front of his family; both of the victims suffered severe head trauma.

=== Search warrant ===
Investigators filed a search warrant at 12:13 a.m. CST on December 31, 2020, that revealed recovery from the December 30 shooting of a handgun found near Idd's body and a spent 45 caliber cartridge on floor of the car driven by Idd, as well as a high-capacity pistol that a confidential informant intended to purchase. The warrant noted a federal Bureau of Alcohol, Tobacco, Firearms and Explosives (ATF) investigation that Idd had possessed a stolen, 12-gauge shotgun. The warrant application also cited Idd's criminal history and the November 30, 2020, homicide allegedly committed by his brother, Mohamed Idd, as further justification for a search of Idd's Eden Prairie home address. Hennepin County District Judge Peter Cahill electronically signed the warrant at 12:20 a.m.

=== "Knock and announce" search ===
The Hennepin County Sheriff's Office assisted the Bureau of Criminal Apprehension in executing the search warrant at 2:35 a.m. CST on December 31, 2020. The type of warrant issued at the home was a "knock and announce"—which became a key issue in the Breonna Taylor case, a fatal officer-involved shooting of a black woman in Louisville, Kentucky, in March 2020 when authorities had a "no-knock" warrant—where officers must announce their presence before entering.

After the search of the Idd family home drew controversy, and left the family feeling "terrorized" by the ordeal, the sheriff's office released a 28-minute video from officer body camera footage. The footage revealed deputies announcing, “Police, search warrant!” as they pushed their way into the home with drawn assault rifles and pistols. Several adults in the home had their hands zip-tied by officers, even while appearing cooperative, as questions they had for the officers about the search largely went unanswered. The family was not informed that Dolal Idd had been fatally shot earlier until the end of the two-hour search of their home.

The sheriff's office said that the warranted search of the home was "high risk" and that officers followed protocol, which included use of flexible, plastic handcuffs placed in front of adult bodies.

=== Result of the search ===
Authorities did not recover any firearms in a search of the home.

== Initial response and reactions ==
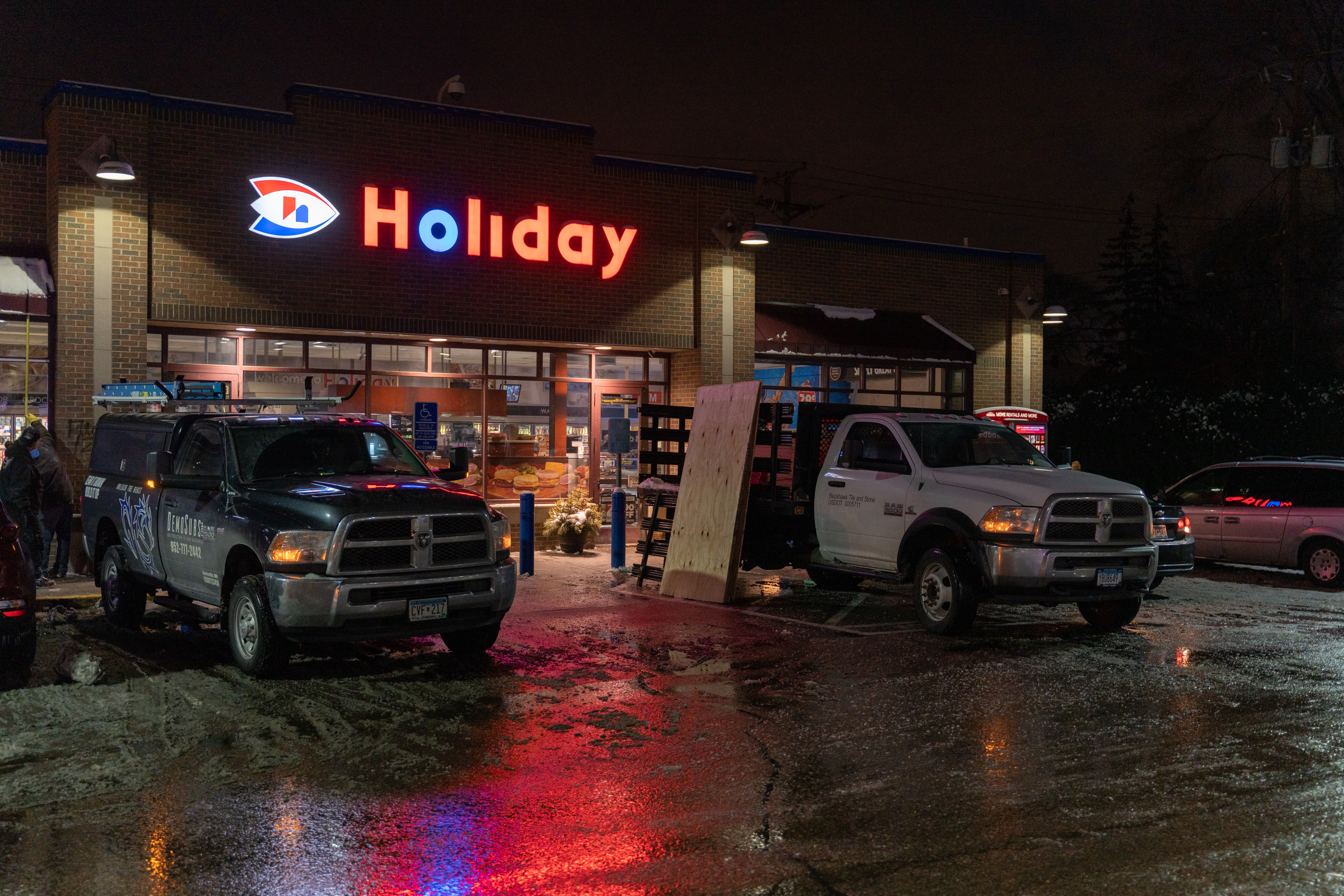
Boarding up of the Holiday gas station, December 31, 2020

=== Minneapolis police ===
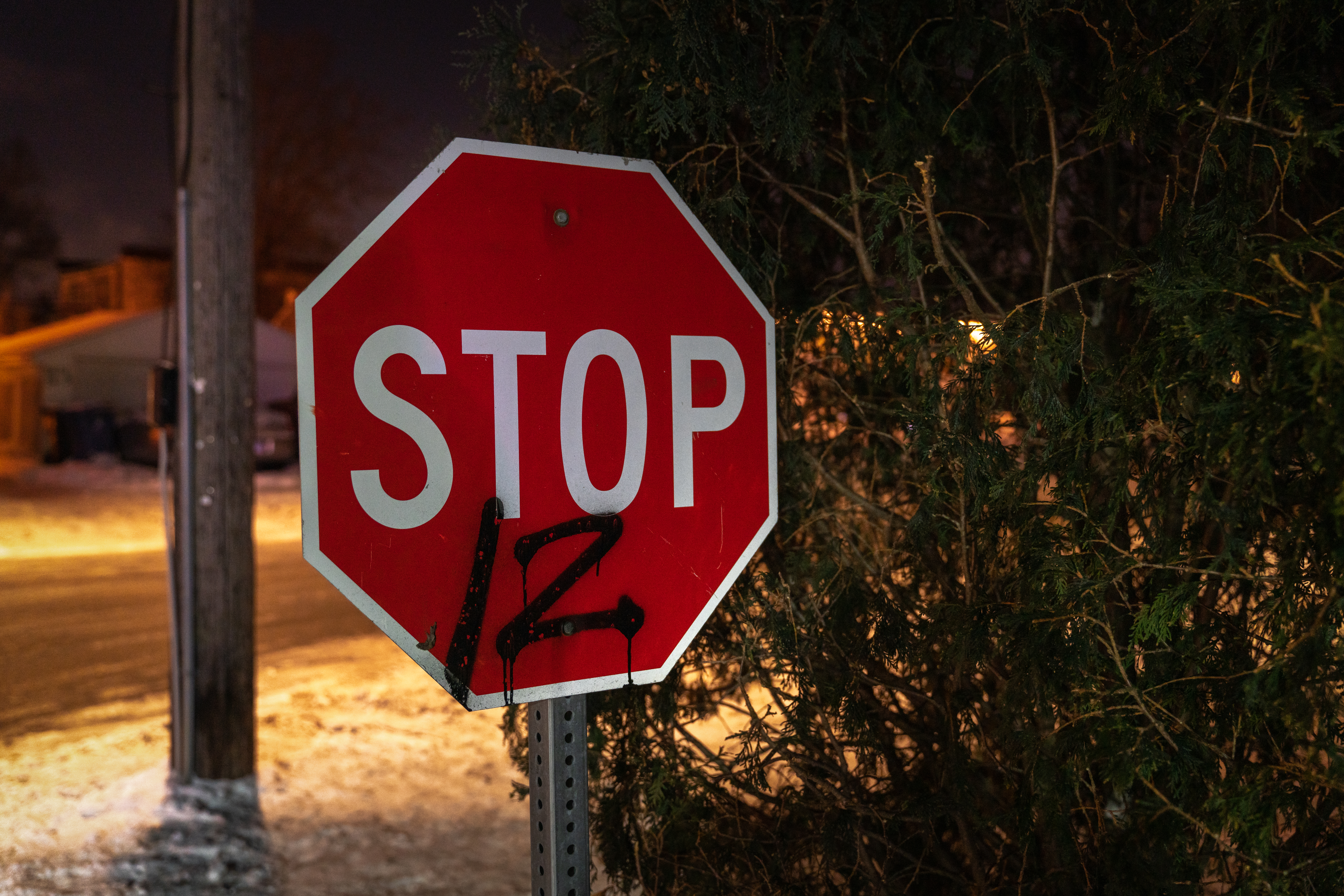
Anti-police graffiti near Cedar Avenue in Minneapolis, December 31, 2020

In a press conference the night of December 30, 2020, Minneapolis Police Chief Medaria Arradondo gave a preliminary report about the incident, as protestors quickly began gathering at the scene of the shooting who were aware police had shot and killed a civilian. Arradondo said that police conducted a traffic stop that involved a person they characterized as a "felony suspect". He said that according to witnesses to the police, a civilian had fired an initial shot at officers, who then returned fire, killing the civilian. Arradondo said the police would release body camera footage of the incident the following day, and that an outside investigation was already underway by the Minnesota Bureau of Criminal Apprehension, the agency responsible for investigating officer-involved shootings.

The Minneapolis Police Department released a 27-second video from an officer's body camera on December 31, 2020. A spokesperson for Minneapolis Mayor Jacob Frey said the city released the video footage to dispel rumors about the incident, and that the segment released had the clearest view of footage they had in possession. Minneapolis police and city officials stated that the shooting would bring back painful memories for the city's residents who were still dealing with the aftermath of the murder of George Floyd in May 2020.

Release of the body camera footage within 24 hours of the incident was done so more quickly that in other cases in Minnesota where such releases can take months or even a year after an incident. Minnesota Statute prevented the release of information from active investigations, but Minneapolis officials used a special provision in the statute to release information if it could "dispel widespread rumor or unrest". The same provision was last used in August 2020 when false rumors of a police shooting led to violent rioting in downtown Minneapolis, and officials released a graphic video of a man committing suicide to inform the community about what happened.

At a press conference on December 31, 2020, Minneapolis Police Chief Medaria Arradondo said that police officers attempted the traffic stop as "probable cause" in a weapons investigation. The department said it had substantial evidence in the case, but Arradondo did not reveal more details about the department's investigation at that time, such as if Idd had been charged with a crime or if he had a warrant for his arrest. Arradondo also said that video evidence and eyewitness accounts of people who were nearby the December 30, 2020, shooting suggested that Idd fired his weapon at police first. The Minneapolis Police Department deferred to the Minnesota Bureau of Criminal Apprehension for further investigation.

=== Public officials ===
Minnesota Governor Tim Walz said in a media interview on January 3, 2021, “Any time you have something like this it's tragic. Why was someone shooting at the police? Why do we have a fatality? BCA, which is involved in any officer-involved shooting, is doing this (investigation)."

About the raid on the Idd family home, Minnesota State Representative Hodan Hassan said in early January 2021, “I don't see professionalism. I don't see any respect for the family. I don't see cultural sensitivity. And I don't see compassion."

Minnesota State Senator-elect Omar Fateh, whose district encompassed the Holiday gas station where the shooting took place, said in early January 2021, "This type of treatment for a bereaved family is inhumane and unconscionable. The police have lost the public trust, especially within BIPOC communities. My heart aches for the family of Dolal Idd."

Minneapolis Mayor Jacob Frey said at a December 31, 2020, press conference, "Our city is experiencing a lot of raw emotion right now. I know that is especially true for our Somali community, who has lost a young man. Gun violence has gripped our city and today is no exception, but the circumstances and the details of what transpired last night, does not negate the tragedy of yesterday's death."

Minneapolis City Council Member Andrea Jenkins, who represented the city's eight ward, said in early January 2021, “It's a big tragedy. We must have a full and thorough investigation, and if there is any wrongdoing, police need to be held accountable.”

Minneapolis City Council Member Phillipe Cunningham said on January 1, 2021, via Twitter, "Sadly, it appears that Dolal Idd brought an illegal gun into our city, shot at police according to body cam footage, and lost his life as a result."

Minneapolis Police Chief Medaria Arradondo said soon after the December 30, 2020, shooting, "I recognize the trauma that our city has been under, and we want to do everything we can to maintain the peace. Our city has gone through too much. We need to keep our officers safe. We need to keep our community safe."

=== Others ===
Jaylani Hussein, executive director of Minnesota's Council on American-Islamic Relations, said on December 31, 2020, that the 27-second video released by Minneapolis police of Idd's death was "inconclusive".

Local activist Nekima Levy Armstrong said on December 31, 2020, "It's still extremely difficult to believe the police version of events.... Why did you pull the man over in the first place? When he tried to leave, why did you cattle him in? Why did you get all ready for some bloodshed?”

A family member disputed the police narrative that Idd fired first. Idd's family felt the police response, which also included a search of the family's Eden Prairie home with a warrant, was excessive and demanded justice over Dolal Idd's death.

== Investigation of the shooting ==
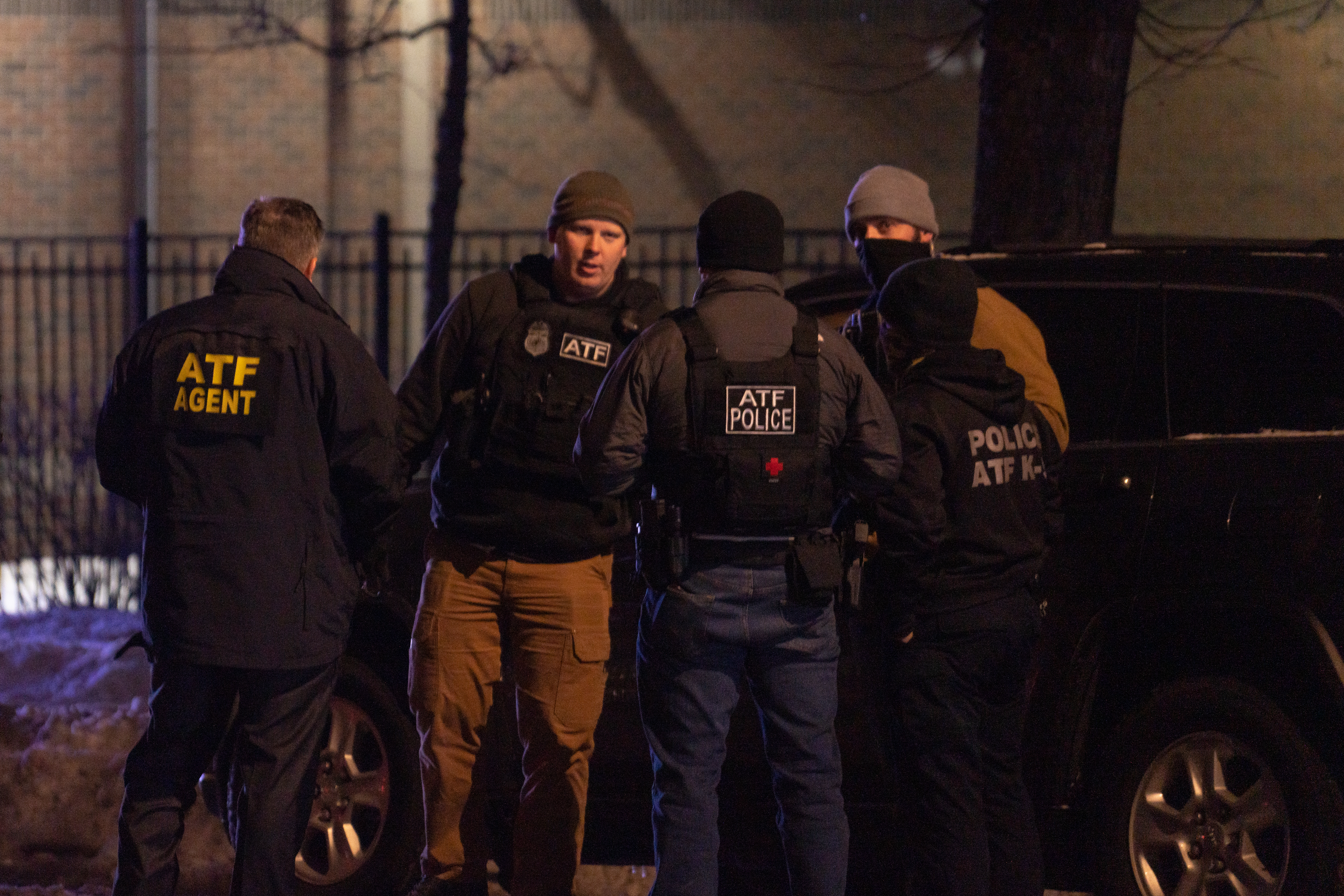
ATF agents investigating the shooting scene, December 30, 2020.

=== Autopsy ===
On December 31, 2020, the Hennepin County medical examiner's office identified the deceased person from the shootout as Dolal B. Idd, a 23-year-old black man. An autopsy by the medical examiner revealed the cause of Idd's death to be multiple gunshot wounds. The manner of Idd's death was characterized as a homicide. A toxicology report from the autopsy also found that Idd had positive blood levels for Delta-9 THC and Fentanyl.

=== Bureau of Criminal Apprehension preliminary findings ===
The Minnesota Bureau of Criminal Apprehension released a preliminary report about the shooting on January 4, 2021. The report stated that after police received information from an informant, they attempted to purchase a gun from Idd at a gas station as part of a weapons investigation. The report further stated that "when officers surrounded Mr. Idd's vehicle to arrest him, Mr. Idd struck several police vehicles with his own vehicle, then fired his weapon at officers." Idd died of multiple gunshot wounds from the rounds fired by Minneapolis Police Officers Paul Huynh, Darcy Klund, and Jason Schmitt, according to the report. The bureau confirmed recovery of two guns, a handgun and a MAC-10 gun, in Idd's vehicle. The bureau said that additional information and video footage of the shooting would not be released until after the investigation of the officers involved was closed.

=== Investigation of the involved officers ===
The three Minneapolis police officers who fired at Idd were placed on administrative leave after the incident, a standard practice pending further investigation. Idd was killed in Hennepin County. Following an agreement signed by five Minneapolis–Saint Paul metropolitan area counties in mid 2020 concerning deadly police encounters, the Hennepin County Attorney's Office said on January 4, 2021, it would defer to prosecutors from another metropolitan county, in this instance Dakota County, about whether to file charges against the officers who shot and killed Idd. To avoid the appearance of a conflict of interest, Hennepin County had the option to seek review by another county, or request that the Attorney General of Minnesota's office review the case.

Dakota County Attorney James Backstrom said on January 4, 2021, that his office would review the case to determine if the officers were legally justified to use force, and his office would handle any potential charges of the officers. Citing health concerns, the 68-year old Backstrom retired as the county attorney on February 27, 2021, and Kathryn Keena became the next Dakota County attorney. By mid 2021, the Bureau of Criminal Apprehension had not finished its investigation of the shooting, and the case had not yet been sent to Dakota County for a possible decision to charge the police officers. In July 2021, the family of Dolal Idd expressed dissatisfaction with the lack of information provided by the Minnesota Bureau of Criminal Apprehension and made a public request for Minnesota Attorney General Keith Ellison to take over the case.

=== Final charging decision of the involved officers ===
On June 28, 2021, the Dakota County attorney's office received from the Minnesota Bureau of Criminal Apprehension the full case file for the incident that led to Dolal Idd's death. Dakota County Attorney Kathryn Keena released a final charging decision memorandum on August 6, 2021. Her 13-page report "concluded that the use of deadly force was justified in this instance", and there was no legal basis to file criminal charges against Huynh, Klund, or Schmitt. Under Minnesota Statutes, police officers were permitted to use deadly force to protect officers from death or serious harm. According to the report, Idd discharged a firearm during the course of incident that struck the hood of the unmarked police vehicle containing Klund and two other police officers. After the initial shot, Huynh, Klund, and Schmitt returned fire, killing Idd. The female passenger in the vehicle with Idd the night of December 30, 2020, told investigators that as police officers approached the vehicle to arrest Idd, he said he did not want to go to jail, and that he first opened fire with a handgun. Crime scene investigators determined that Idd's gun had fired twice during the incident; two spent cartridges were found inside the white Cobalt vehicle. The reported concluded that in the county attorney's view Idd presented a deadly threat and that it was "objectively reasonable" that the officers returned gunfire.

== Protests ==
=== Protest the night of the shooting ===
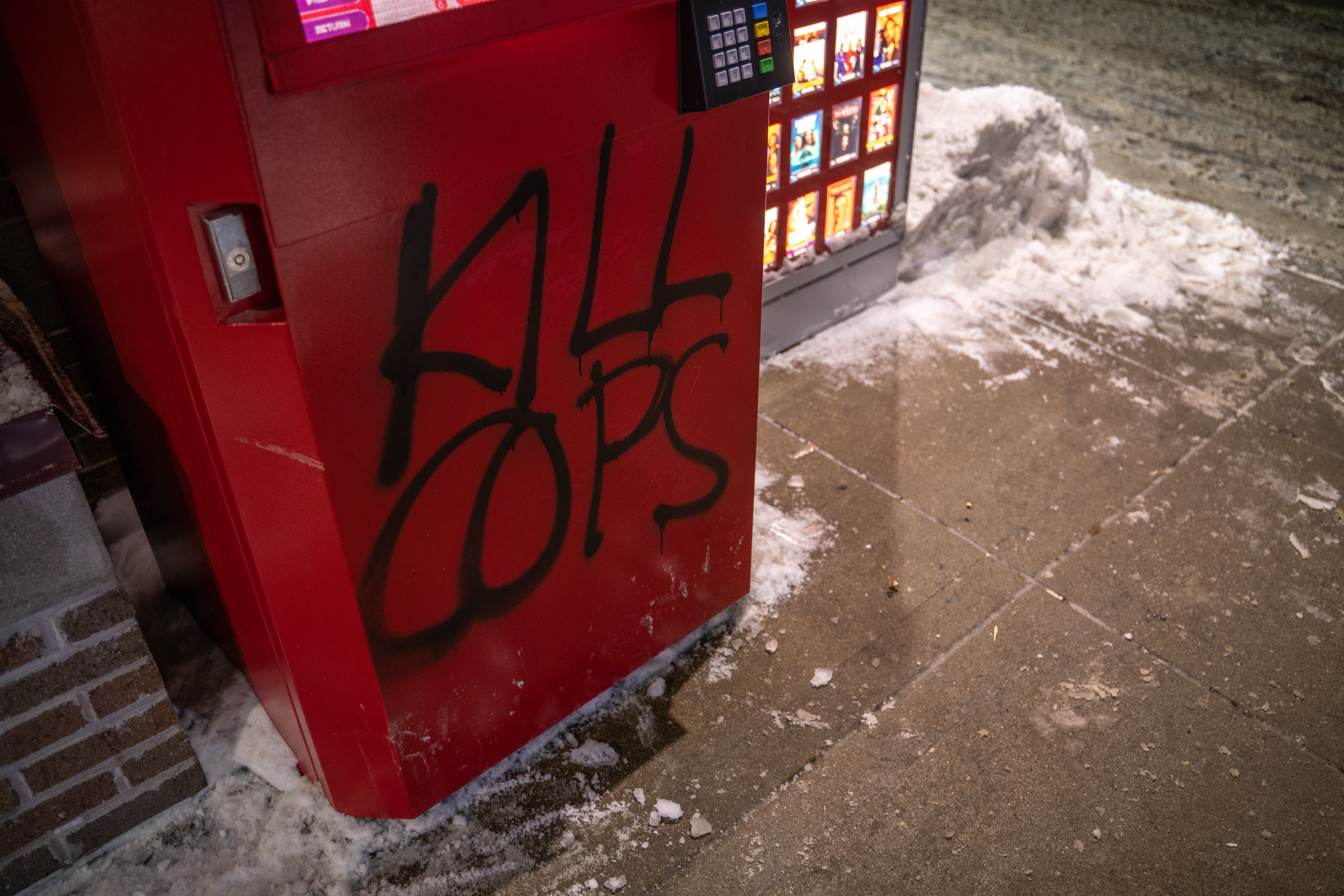
Anti-police graffiti at the Holiday gas station, December 31, 2020.

Protests first emerged the evening of December 30, 2020, when few details were known about the shooting incident. On social media, as news about the incident spread, many disputed the police narrative about the incident, and pointed out that George Floyd's murder in May 2020 was initially described by the police department as a "medical incident", though a bystander's video later showed that Floyd was pinned by a police officer's knee for nearly nine minutes as he struggled to breathe. Protesters over Idd's death demanded more information about the shooting and questioned if police officers could have de-escalated the situation to prevent firing on Idd.

Approximately 100 people gathered at the Holiday gas station near East 36th street and Cedar Avenue in Minneapolis that night in below-freezing temperatures, arriving soon after the shooting incident, and stood opposite police officers who wore riot gear. Some protesters shouted expletives and threw snowballs at police officers who were investigating the scene. In response, officers requested and received dispatch approval to use pepper spray if assaulted by demonstrators; no pepper spray was used. By late evening, the scene was calmer as protesters blocked an intersection and lit a bonfire. The tone of the scene was described as angry, but not violent. A van played loud music and several people gave speeches. Protesters dispersed around midnight and no arrests were reported.

=== Vigil for Dolal Idd ===
On December 31, 2020, hours after the release of the a 27-second segment of body camera footage from the incident on December 30, several people attended a vigil near the intersection of Cedar Avenue and East 36th Street in Minneapolis in for Idd and other people they believed were victims of police violence.

=== South Minneapolis protest march ===
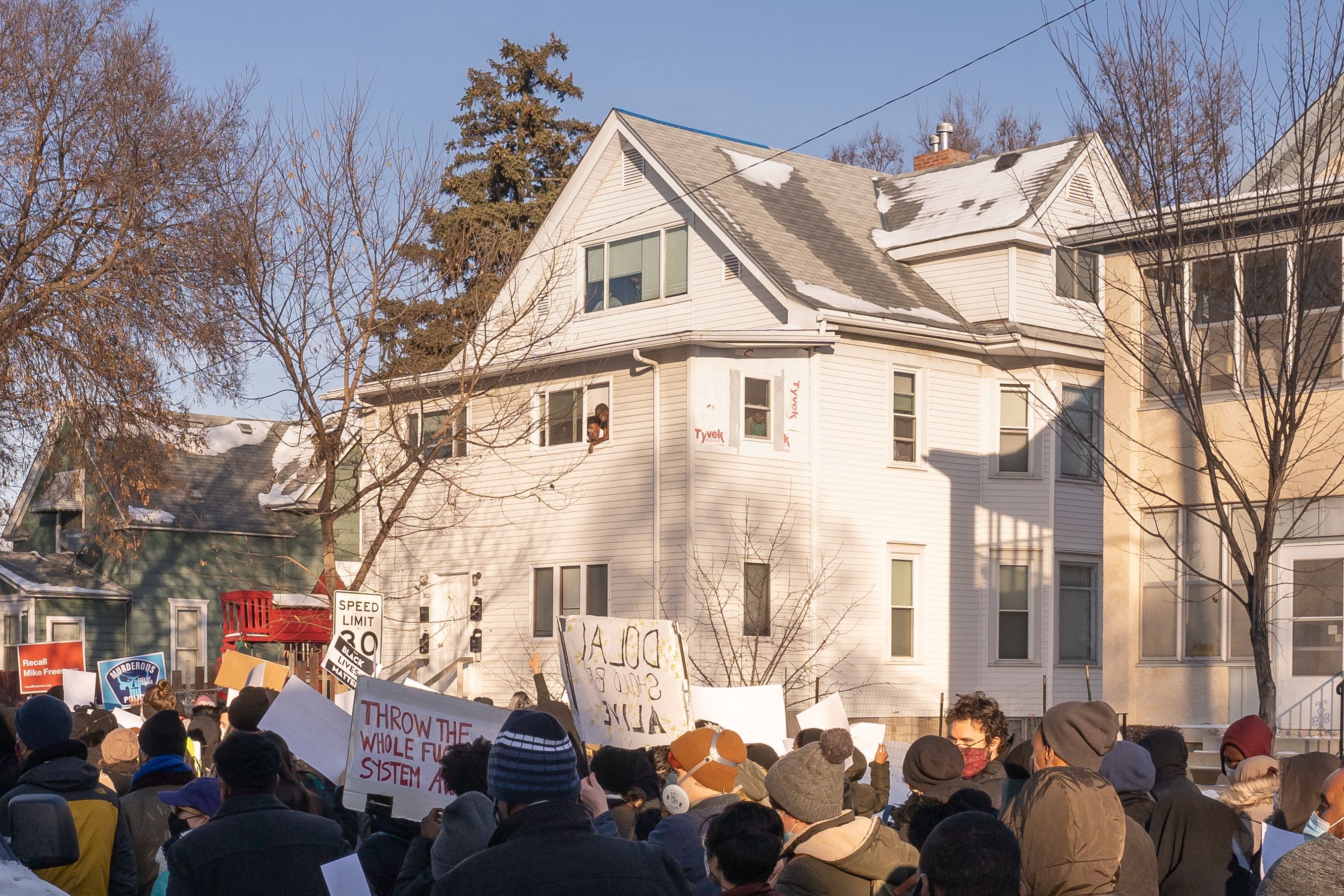
Protest march in Minneapolis, January 3, 2021

As many as 1,000 protesters marched peacefully in south Minneapolis on January 3, 2021, to express outrage over the killing of Dolal Idd and a controversial search by law enforcement of the Idd family home. The march from the East 36th Street and Cedar Avenue intersection to East Lake Street and back featured signs, speeches by activists, and chants in a scene reminiscent of local unrest in mid-2020. Participants in the march, which was organized by the Minnesota chapter of the Council on American-Islamic Relations, did not condone Idd's actions, but felt the use of lethal force was unnecessary and that police were leaving questions about the incident unanswered. Activists called for an independent investigation.

=== Downtown Minneapolis racial justice protest rally ===
Protests over the killing of Dolal Idd broadened to themes of racial injustice and outrage over other police-related violence. In an event organized by the Minnesota chapter of Black Lives Matter, several hundred people gathered in downtown Minneapolis on January 9, 2021, for a rally that featured speeches, hand-drawn signs, and chants. Protesters connected Idd's death to aggressive police action against black men, such as with the murder of George Floyd and shooting of Jacob Blake, which protesters contrasted to the mob that stormed the United States Capitol building on January 6, 2021, when U.S. Capitol police appeared to take little action to stop them.

=== Vigil and protest rally in Tukwila, Washington ===
Approximately 150 people gathered for a vigil for Dolal Idd and racial injustice protest rally outside a public library in Tukwila, Washington, on January 10, 2021. The day's events were coordinated by Somali- and Muslim-American communities in the Seattle metropolitan area. The rally turned into a march to the Tukwila Justice Center, where protesters also called for defunding the police by 50% in lieu of greater investment in the community and youth programs.

=== Governor's mansion demonstration ===
On March 21, 2021, a group of demonstrators rallied outside the Saint Paul residence of Minnesota Governor Tim Walz to call for greater transparency and an independent investigation of the exchange of gunfire that led to Idd's death. Demonstrators were frustrated by the lack of new information about the investigation at nearly three months since Idd's death, and called for the release of all raw video footage from the shooting and search of his home.

=== Intersection with other protests ===
In March and April 2021, Dolal Idd's name and family were fixtures at protests and rallies outside the Hennepin County Government Center building in downtown Minneapolis during the trial of Derek Chauvin, the Minneapolis police officer charged for the murder of George Floyd that occurred on May 25, 2020, during an arrest. They were also a fixture at protests over the fatal shooting of Daunte Wright, a black man, by white police officer Kimberly Potter on April 11, 2021, during a traffic stop in the nearby suburban city of Brooklyn Center, Minnesota. In June 2021, protesters who demonstrated over the killing of Winston Boogie Smith, a black man killed by law enforcement in Minneapolis, also sought answers in Dolal Idd's case.

=== Call for further investigation and review ===
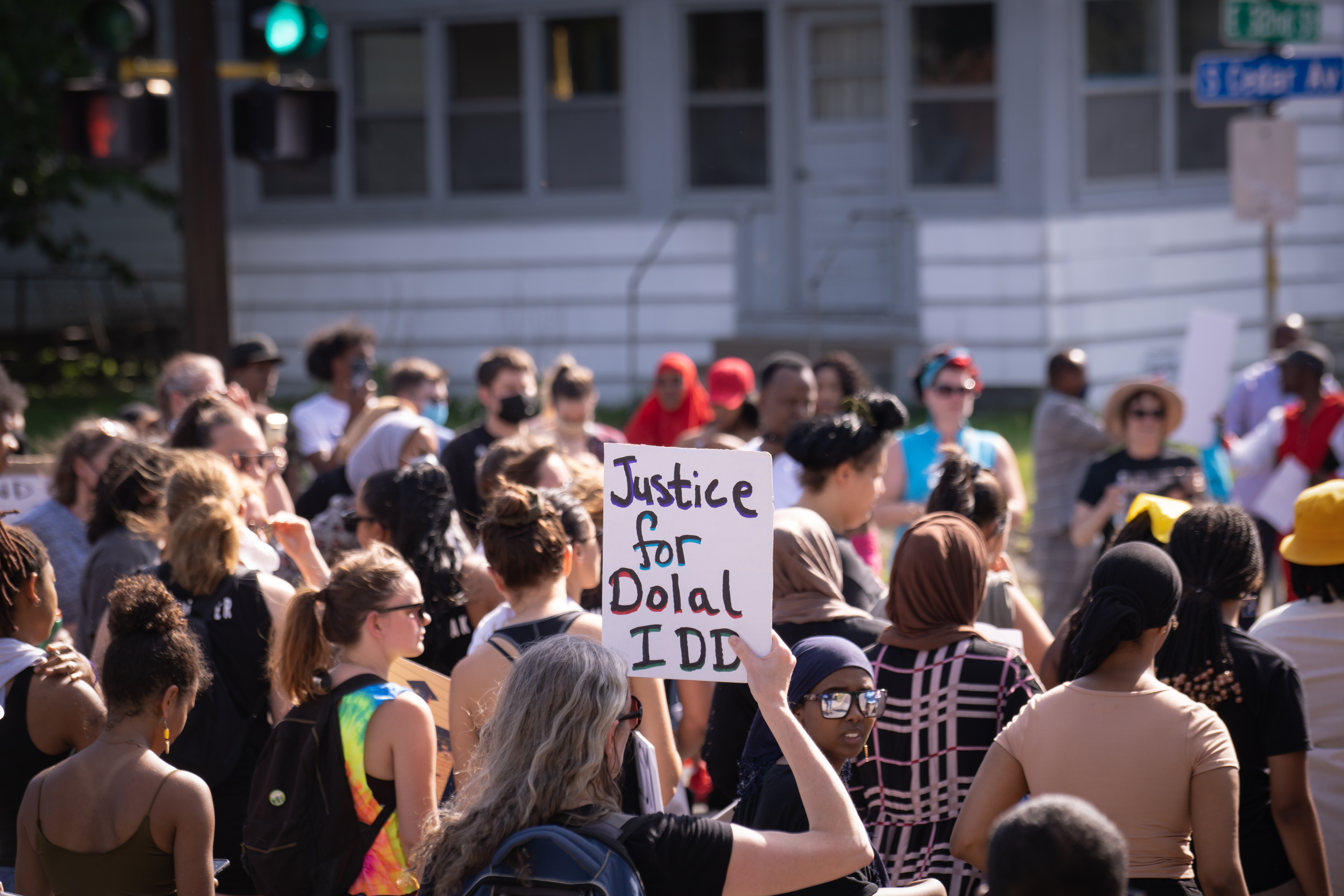
Protest march in Minneapolis, June 6, 2021

Family members of Dolal Idd and protesters held a march in Minneapolis on June 6, 2021, to seek answers in the case that had no public developments for the past several months. They also held a press conference on July 18, 2021, where they encouraged the Minnesota Bureau of Criminal Apprehension to continue investigating the incident and that Minnesota Attorney General Keith Ellison review the case.

=== Reaction to the final charging decision ===
After a report was released by the Dakota County attorney's office on August 6, 2021, that said the Minneapolis police officer's use of force was legally justified when they shot and killed Dolal Idd, family of Idd and social justice advocates held a news conference the same day outside the Saint Paul residence of Governor Walz. They requested that Minnesota Attorney General Keith Ellison review the case, called for release of all raw video footage from the shooting, and that an independent agency investigate the officers’ actions. Social justice advocates also said they would continue to pressure state and local officials for further inquiries of Idd's death. Protests seeking another review of the incident leading to Idd's death were held outside the governor's residence in Saint Paul on August 13–15, 2021.

Activists and family members of Idd rallied in Saint Paul on January 4, 2022, outside the official residence of Governor Walz. They called for further investigation of the incident that led to Idd's death and the release of additional evidence in the case.

=== Further protests ===
In the years after Idd's death, his name continued to be featured in Minneapolis–Saint Paul protests of law enforcement killings and racial injustice.

== Aftermath ==
=== Somali-American perspectives ===
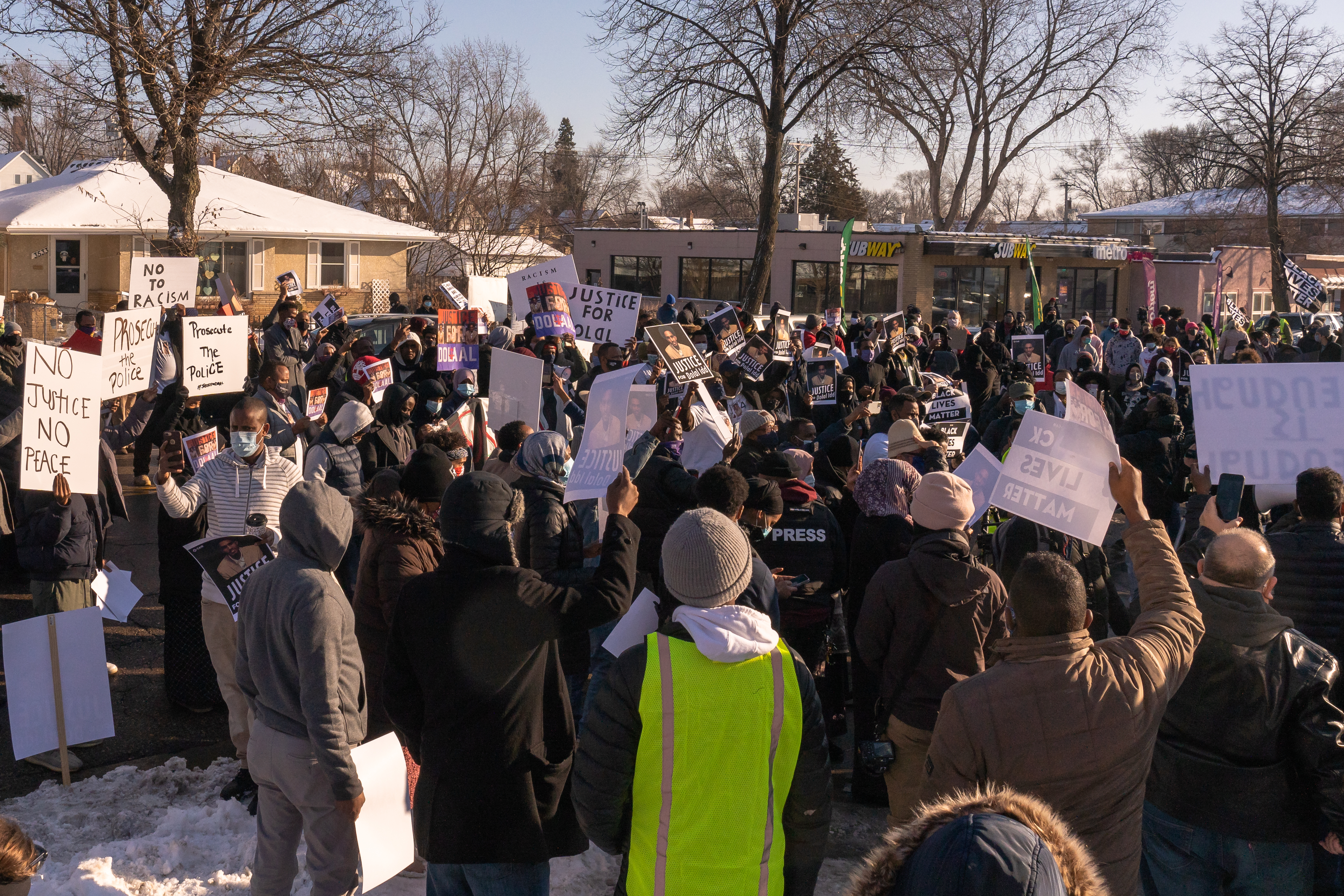
Protest in Minneapolis, January 3, 2021

Idd's death and the treatment of his family during a search of their home had a lasting impact in the Somali-American community in the months after Idd's death. Commentators in the Somali-American community viewed the December 30, 2020, incident as an unjustified, "military-style" killing. Some viewed Idd's death and the search of his family's home as part of historic, criminal profiling of black and Muslim people in America, and compared the police action against Idd to Islamophobia in the United States after the September 11 attacks. They also felt that authorities too easily justified killings of black and Muslim Americans, such as Dolal Idd, by law enforcement. In the Twin Cities metropolitan area, Idd's death was described as a motivating factor for Somali-American activism to advance police reform and racial justice.

=== Further investigations of Dolal Idd ===
On January 13, 2021, the police in Bloomington, Minnesota, obtained a search warrant to investigate Dolal Idd's possible connection to a shootout and homicide on November 30, 2020, allegedly committed by his brother. According to the warrant, surveillance video at 2:30 a.m. CST on November 30, 2020, showed Dolal Idd attempting to enter an apartment building on Old Shakopee Road in Bloomington, texting on his phone, and taking photographs of the building. Three hours later, at approximately 5:30 a.m. CST, an exchange of gunfire at the same apartment building left the 22-year-old Shakur Freed Muhammed of Hopkins, Minnesota, dead.

Dolal Idd's 26-year-old brother, Mohamed Idd, was initially arrested at the apartment building on November 30, 2020, and had suffered gunshot wounds, and was later charged in early December 2020 with second-degree intentional murder in connection with the man's death. Dolal Idd's 27-year old cousin, Abdi Bishar Mohamed, who was also arrested at the apartment building on November 30, 2020, and suffered gunshot wounds, was later charged with aiding an offender and illegal weapons possession. In statements to the police, Mohamed Idd and Abdi Bishar Mohamed gave conflicting accounts about the number of people who were at the scene, with Abdi Bishar Mohamed saying another unnamed accomplice fled out the window when the shooting occurred.

At some point hours before the shooting, Abdi Bishar Muhammed had met up with Mohamed Idd, and Abdi Bishar Muhammed told his girlfriend that he had stolen Percocet pills from him. Witnesses reported seeing two men outside the apartment where Shakur Freed Muhammed was found dead saying, "I'm going to kill you, I'm going to kill you." A search warrant allowed Bloomington police to access Dolal Idd's phone to understand his whereabouts on November 30 and who he was with that day. Bloomington police didn't make any initial public comments about the search warrant. In July 2021, Mohamed Idd pled guilty to the charge of second-degree murder for shooting that occurred on November 30, 2020, and received a 15-year prison sentence. Abdi Bishar Muhammed pled guilty to charges of aiding an offender and assault with a dangerous weapon, and was sentenced to 11 years in prison in September 2021.

=== Comparison to other police shootings ===
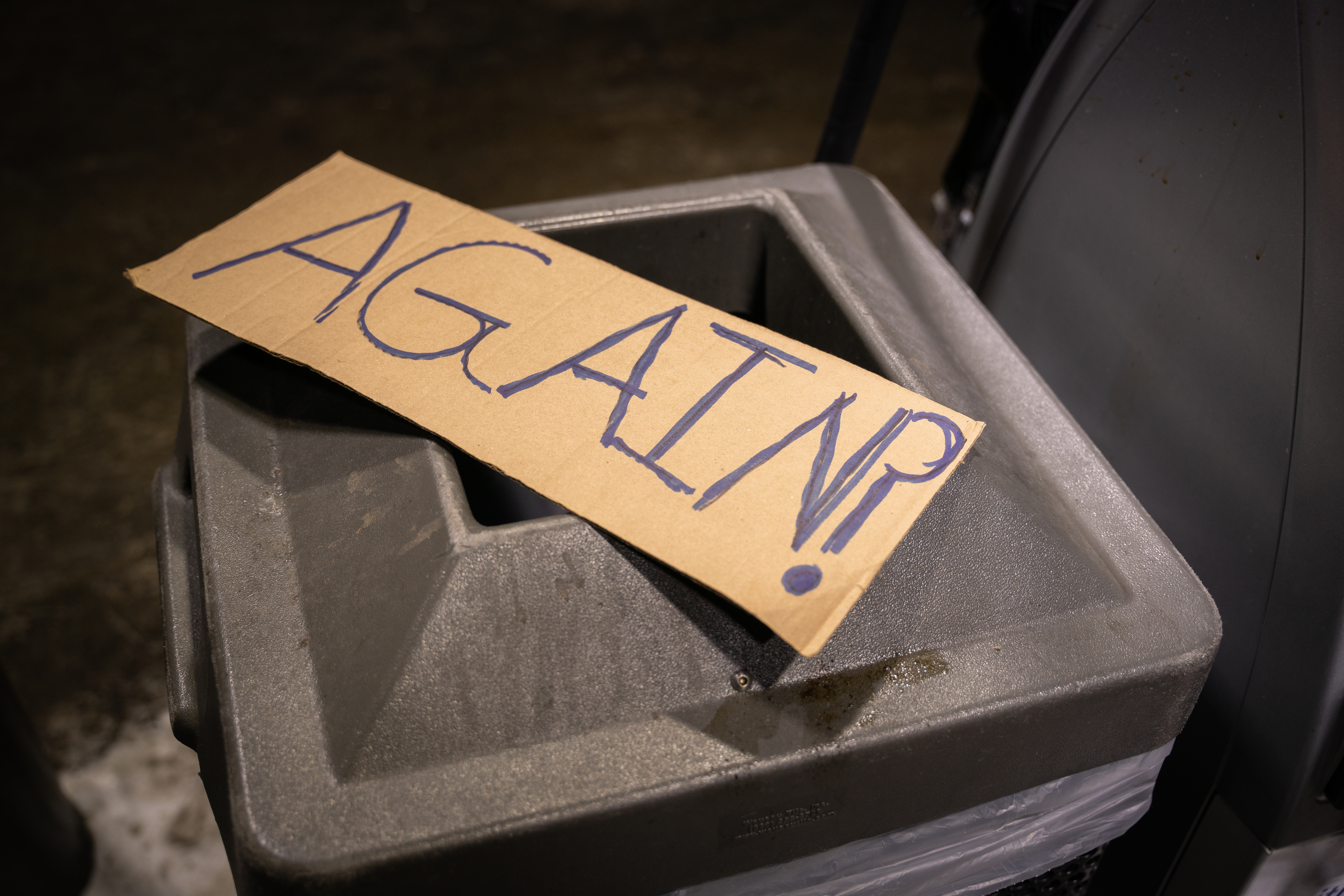
"Again?" protest sign in Minneapolis, December 31, 2020

After Idd's death, some felt police in Minnesota approached the situation differently for black men than they had for white men. Idd's circumstances were compared to a September 2020 incident involving Ricardo Manuel Baldazo of Prior Lake, Minnesota. When police responded to a 9-1-1 call to his mother's house in Burnsville, Baldazo, who later admitted he was under the influence of drugs, fired gunshots from inside the house in the direction of responding officers. Baldazo exited the house with firearms in his hands and complied with police orders to drop the weapons, and was then arrested by police. Some questioned why Baldazo, who is Hispanic, was given the opportunity to surrender peacefully, while Idd was fired upon by Minneapolis police officers.

Eight days after Idd's death, on January 8, 2021, police officers in the Minneapolis suburb of Robbinsdale shot and killed Brian Eugene Andren, a 47-year old white man from Ramsey, Minnesota. Andren had a warrant for his arrest in South Dakota. He had admitted to a child pornography charge, but he failed to show up to be sentenced in December 2020. After a brief car chase with Robbinsdale police, Andren wielded a knife as officers attempted to subdue and arrest him, and after attempting to use a taser, an officer fired his weapon three times, killing Andren. The shooting was the subject of a protest and counter-demonstration in Robbinsdale.

On June 3, 2021, undercover law enforcement officers participating in a federally led task force shot and killed Winston Boogie Smith, a black man, during an attempted arrest in the Uptown area of Minneapolis. The details of Smith's death were compared to that of Dolal Idd, and protests and unrest occurred in reaction to the shooting over the subsequent weeks.

== See also ==
- 2020–2021 Minneapolis–Saint Paul racial unrest
- History of Somalis in Minneapolis–Saint Paul
- List of killings by law enforcement officers in Minnesota
