= Killing of Ricky Cobb II =

Police shooting in Minneapolis, Minnesota, US

Coordinates: 44.988°N 93.288°W

- Date: July 31, 2023
- Location: Minneapolis, Minnesota, United States
- Deaths: 1 (Cobb)
- Accused: Ryan Londregan
- Charges: Second degree unintentional murder First degree assault Second degree manslaughter
- Verdict: Charges dropped

On July 31, 2023, a 33-year-old African-American man named Ricky Cobb II was shot and killed by Minnesota State Patrol troopers in Minneapolis, Minnesota following a traffic violation. The trooper who killed him was charged with second-degree unintentional murder, first-degree assault, and second-degree manslaughter, but the charges were later dropped.

== Incident ==
Just after 1:50 a.m., Ricky Cobb II was pulled over on Interstate 94 in Minneapolis by State Troopers Brett Seide and Garrett Erickson because the taillights on Cobb's car were not functional. After pulling him over, Seide checked Cobb's record and found that he was wanted in nearby Ramsey County for "probable cause arrest for a felony order-for-protection violation." Officials in Ramsey County had requested that Cobb be arrested.

Trooper Ryan Londregan reoprtedly arrived-on scene after Seide and Erickson. According to court records, Seide approached the driver's side door to inform Cobb that he was being arrested, and Londregan approached the passenger door. Londregan reached into the passenger side of the car, unlocked the doors, and attempted to open the passenger door. Seide had reportedly attempted to pull Cobb out of his car. Cobb then allegedly attempted to drive away; Londregan reached for his gun, and Cobb stopped his vehicle. Londregan then pointed his gun at Cobb and yelled at him to exit his vehicle. Cobb took his foot off of his car's brakes, and less than a second later, Londregan fired his gun twice at Cobb, striking him in the chest.

Cobb's car kept moving for about one-quarter mile, and then struck a concrete median. Seide's torso was still inside Cobb's vehicle when Londregan shot him, and Seide was dragged for several feet before falling. Emergency medical aid was attempted, Cobb was pronounced dead at the scene.

== Aftermath ==
The three troopers involved in the incident were placed on administrative leave immediately following the incident. Matt Langer, the chief of State Patrol, stated that Londregan would remain on paid leave during the internal affairs investigation of the incident.

Later on July 31, 2023, a vigil and group prayer was held in honor of Cobb that was attended by over 100 people, including Cobb's family and friends. On August 2, 2023, Cobb's family and several racial justice organizations held a press conference, demanding that the officers involved in Cobb's killing be immediately fired, arrested, and prosecuted.

The Hennepin County Coroner declared Cobb's death a homicide caused by multiple gunshot wounds. In January 2024, Londregan was charged with second-degree unintentional murder, first-degree assault, and second-degree manslaughter. During the proceedings, Londregan remained free without bail, but was ordered to temporarily surrender his passport and avoid contact with Cobb's relatives.

On Sunday, June 2, 2024, Hennepin County Attorney Mary Moriarty dropped the charges against Londregan. In a press release, the County Attorney's Office stated that the charges were dropped because the prosecution no longer believed it could prove beyond a reasonable doubt that Londregan's use of deadly force was not jusitifed, citing Londregan's prospective testimony that he saw Cobb reach for his gun and a sworn declaration from a Minnesota State Patrol trainer stating that he never instructed pupils to not shoot into a moving vehicle during an extraction. At a press conference the next day, June 3, 2024, Minnesota Governor Tim Walz told members of the press that if Moriarty had not dismissed the case against Londregan, Governor Walz would have taken the case away from her and assigned another prosecutor. The Hennepin County Attorney's Office published a redacted summary of a report prepared by Washington D.C.-based law firm Steptoe LLP, who Moriarty had hired to assist with the prosecution. According to the Minnesota Star Tribune, the prosecution's own use-of-force expert concluded that Londregan's decision to shoot Seide was likely justified because he feared for the safety of Seide, who had half his body in the car when Cobb shifted his car into drive and took his foot off the brake.

A civil lawsuit brought by Cobb's mother against Londregan was dismissed on October 30, 2024 by the Honorable Nancy E. Brasel, who found that Trooper Londregan's use of force was objectively reasonable. On July 7, 2026, the Eight Circuit Court of Appeals affirmed Judge Brasel's ruling.

== See also ==
- George Floyd protests
- Murder of George Floyd
- Lists of killings by law enforcement officers in the United States
  - List of killings by law enforcement officers in Minnesota
  - List of killings by law enforcement officers in the United States, July 2023
