= List of killings by law enforcement officers in the United States, July 2023 =

This is a list of people reported killed by non-military law enforcement officers in the United States in July 2023, whether in the line of duty or not, and regardless of reason or method. The listing documents the occurrence of a death, making no implications regarding wrongdoing or justification on the part of the person killed or officer involved. Killings are arranged by date of the incident that caused death. Different death dates, if known, are noted in the description. The table below lists 97 people.

== July 2023 ==
Date	Name (age) of deceased	Race	Location	Description
2023-07-31	Ricky Cobb II (33)	Black	Minneapolis, Minnesota	According to law enforcement officials, a Minnesota State Patrol trooper shot and killed a motorist after he fled a traffic stop off Interstate 94.
2023-07-31	unidentified male		Brookhaven, Georgia	Around 5:30 p.m., Brookhaven police officers got a 911 call about a man who was armed with a knife and yelling at customers at Town Brookhaven. Officers located the man and when the officers went to speak with him, he allegedly became angry and threw his drink at them. One officer fired a stun gun at the man, but it was ineffective. The man then allegedly charged at the officers, which prompt one of the officers to shoot the man. The man later died at Grady Memorial Hospital.
2023-07-31	Sistrane Edwards (64)	Black	Ville Platte, Louisiana	Police investigating drug offenses at a house were fired upon by a resident, who shot and killed Ville Platte Deputy Marshal Barry Giglio. Officers returned fire, and 45-year-old Cynthia Soileau and Soileau’s husband, 64-year-old Sistrane Edwards, were shot, Edwards fatally.
2023-07-30	David McClure (33)	White	Jackson, Michigan	McClure allegedly killed his 55-year-old mother and rammed police cars investigating the scene with his own vehicle. He then charged at police with a weapon and was shot by officers. McClure died in hospital on August 2.
2023-07-30	Kyle Larkin (31)	White	Palm Bay, Florida	After holding his family hostage and shooting at officers during a standoff, Larkin was shot by police.
2023-07-30	Ronaldo Alvarado (25)		McAllen, Texas	Police received a call about a man being intoxicated, aggressive and armed with a gun. The caller also gave out Alvarado's vehicle description. When police located Alvarado's vehicle, he allegedly shot at them. Alvarado then drove away. At some point, an officer shot Alvarado; causing him to collide with a fence four blocks away from the original scene. Alvarado was found slumped over with a gunshot wound to his head inside the vehicle.
2023-07-28	Tracie Dorpat (42)	White	Greenfield, Wisconsin	Dorpat died after being hit by a Greenfield Police squad car.
2023-07-27	unidentified male		Houston, Texas	
2023-07-27	David Guilbeau (60)		Groves, Texas	
2023-07-27	Darien Young (29)		Miami Beach, Florida	
2023-07-26	Rubyn Murray (38)	Black	Elmore County, Alabama	A corrections officer at Elmore Correctional Facility allegedly let two inmates into Murray's cell and allowed them to beat him to death. The guard and the two inmates were charged with murder.
2023-07-26	Ryant Bluford (41)	Black	San Francisco, California	
2023-07-26	Tommie Jackson (69)	Black	Stamford, Connecticut	Officer Zachary Lockwood struck and killed Jackson as he crossed the street.
2023-07-26	Macey Juker (28)		Boise, Idaho	
2023-07-25	unidentified female		Westminster, Colorado	
2023-07-25	Christopher Fortin (34)		Terre Haute, Indiana	
2023-07-25	Matthew Dimas (38)		Logan, New Mexico	
2023-07-25	Meyvic Arreola (44)		Los Angeles, California	Arreola was fatally shot by LAPD officers after stabbing a man inside a Denny's.
2023-07-24	John Stockton (52)		Purcell, Oklahoma	
2023-07-24	Steven Lawrence Tropia (37)	White	Franklin, Tennessee	
2023-07-24	Dominick Hogans (27)	Black	Allentown, Pennsylvania	
2023-07-23	Frank Foss Jr. (28)		Chelsea, Maine	
2023-07-22	PoniaX Kane Calles		Portland, Oregon	
2023-07-22	Franklin Castro Ordonez (19)		Silver Spring, Maryland	
2023-07-21	Thomas Curtis Sizemore (62)	Unknown	Lebanon, Tennessee	Sizemore shot and killed a 63-year-old neighbor during a dispute. When an officer arrived, Sizemore fired a handgun towards his neighbor's house, causing the officer to shoot him. He died in hospital over a week later.
2023-07-21	Dantonior Stalling (23)		Baton Rouge, Louisiana	
2023-07-21	Taylor Lee Richard Drew (34)		Fredericksburg, Virginia	
2023-07-21	Christopher Rodriguez		Tucson, Arizona	
2023-07-20	Emmanuel Galaviz Campos (20)	Latino	Albuquerque, New Mexico	
2023-07-20	unidentified male		Los Angeles, California	Shot in the Chest by a LAPD officer. What led to the shooting is unknown.
2023-07-19	James Woodrome (60)		Austin, Texas	
2023-07-19	Justin Scott Lantz (27)		Lacey Spring, Virginia	
2023-07-19	unidentified male		Owensburg, Indiana	
2023-07-19	unidentified male		Denver, Colorado	
2023-07-17	Michael Bresnahan (33)	White	Tampa, Florida	
2023-07-17	Norman Edward Dawson (56)		Jasper, Georgia	
2023-07-17	Tony Roy (44)		Detroit, Michigan	
2023-07-17	Scott Arthur O’Brien	White	Sophia, West Virginia	
2023-07-17	Willis Thomas Jr. (31)		Harvey, Louisiana	
2023-07-17	unidentified male		Phoenix, Arizona	
2023-07-17	Victor Harris (29)		Joliet, Illinois	
2023-07-16	Charoyd Bell (43)	Black	Natchez, Mississippi	
2023-07-16	Adrian San Martin (30)		San Antonio, Texas	
2023-07-16	Gregory Don Bratcher Jr (45)		Odenville, Alabama	
2023-07-16	unidentified male (43)		Las Cruces, New Mexico	
2023-07-15	Andre Longmore (40)	Black	Hampton, Georgia	
2023-07-14	Rachael Ellis (32)		Orlando, Florida	Ellis was shot and killed by Orlando Police after she allegedly charged at them with a knife.
2023-07-14	Mohamad Barakat (37)		Fargo, North Dakota	Barakat fired a gun at officers Jake Wallin, Andrew Dotas, Tyler Hawes, and Zach Robinson as they investigated a car crash. Officer Wallin died at the scene, while Officers Hawes and Dotas were critically injured. Officer Robinson then shot and killed the suspect. A civilian was also injured.
2023-07-14	unidentified male		Denver, Colorado	
2023-07-13	Daniel Sheehan (30)		Tucson, Arizona	
2023-07-13	Jeremiah Ladner (38)		Saucier, Mississippi	
2023-07-13	Jabarie Camron Bozeman (20)		Wetumpka, Alabama	
2023-07-12	Jamal Ray Brown (21)	Black	Houston, Texas	
2023-07-11	Jeremiah Wise (33)		Byesville, Ohio	
2023-07-11	unidentified male		Albany, Kentucky	
2023-07-11	Sara Weideman-Ramos (40)		Converse, Texas	
2023-07-09	Andrew Scott Norton (32)	Unknown	Amarillo, Texas	Police stopped a car with a license plate that didn't match the vehicle. One of the passengers, Norton, allegedly exited the vehicle and pointed a pistol at officers. Police shot and killed him and Castillo, another passenger. The driver of the vehicle was released at the scene.
2023-07-09	Isidra Clara Castillo (38)	Latino	Amarillo, Texas	Police stopped a car with a license plate that didn't match the vehicle. One of the passengers, Norton, allegedly exited the vehicle and pointed a pistol at officers. Police shot and killed him and Castillo, another passenger. The driver of the vehicle was released at the scene.
2023-07-09	Charlie Foster (18)	White	Dillon, Colorado	
2023-07-09	unidentified person		Mescalero, New Mexico	
2023-07-09	unidentified male		Grand Haven, Michigan	
2023-07-09	Jessica Brown (35)		Los Angeles, California	
2023-07-09	Salvador Manzo Jr (44)	Latino	Odessa, Texas	
2023-07-09	Garren Patty (30)	White	Covington, Kentucky	
2023-07-08	unidentified male		Jersey City, New Jersey	
2023-07-08	Duterval Sejour (36)	Black	Augusta, Georgia	
2023-07-08	unidentified male		Columbus, Ohio	
2023-07-08	Matthew Briggs (42)	White	Omaha, Nebraska	
2023-07-07	Charles Byers (34)		Chesterfield County, Virginia	
2023-07-07	Somchan Somsanith (42)	Asian	Boiling Springs, South Carolina	Police responded to a disturbance call and found Somsanith allegedly holding a child hostage at gunpoint. Following a standoff, police shot and killed Someanith.
2023-07-07	unidentified male		Roy, Utah	
2023-07-06	unidentified male		Columbus, Ohio	
2023-07-06	Shawn Gagne (28)		Phoenix, Arizona	
2023-07-06	Anthony Jay Rios Jr (21)	Latino	Glendale, Arizona	
2023-07-05	Barry Eugene Phillips (53)		Prudenville, Michigan	
2023-07-05	Billy Smith (21)	Black	Fort Worth, Texas	
2023-07-05	Bronshay Minter (30)	Black	Fort Worth, Texas	
2023-07-05	unidentified male		Bartlesville, Oklahoma	
2023-07-04	Frankie Cope (43)		Lexington, Tennessee	
2023-07-04	Greg Covey (24)		Santa Clarita, California	
2023-07-04	unidentified male (56)		Phoenix, Arizona	
2023-07-03	Lance Daniel Paxton (31)		Owasso, Oklahoma	
2023-07-03	John Vincent Dye (51)	White	Homer City, Pennsylvania	
2023-07-03	Ahmad Abdullah (25)	Black	Huntington, West Virginia	
2023-07-03	Randy Jackson (39)	Black	St. Joseph, Illinois	
2023-07-03	Sean Hubert (34)	White	Tell City, Indiana	
2023-07-03	Derek Diaz (26)	Latino	Orlando, Florida	
2023-07-03	Wesley Taylor (57)	White	Asheville, North Carolina	
2023-07-03	Jerrel Jerril Garris (37)	Black	New Rochelle, New York	
2023-07-03	unidentified person		Ashland, California	
2023-07-02	Robbie Thomas Saunders (59)	White	Ligonier, Pennsylvania	
2023-07-02	Sean Burke (34)		Anchorage, Alaska	
2023-07-02	Sam Knight (40)		Meldrim, Georgia	
2023-07-01	Wendell Dalton (58)	White	Harts, West Virginia	
2023-07-01	Devon Derantez Rutherford (20)	Mixed	Gallatin, Tennessee	
2023-07-01	Raul Mendez (37)		Phoenix, Arizona	
2023-07-01	Lance Aguilar (26)		Taos, New Mexico	

== See also ==
- Death in custody § United States
- Henry A. Wallace Police Crime Public Database
- List of cases of police brutality
- List of countries with annual rates and counts for killings by law enforcement officers
- List of law enforcement officers killed in the line of duty in the United States
- List of law enforcement officers convicted for an on-duty killing in the United States
- List of shootings by US immigration agents
- List of police reforms related to the George Floyd protests
- List of unarmed African Americans killed by law enforcement officers in the United States
- Lists of killings by law enforcement officers
- Police brutality in the United States
- Police misconduct § United States
- Police riot § United States
- Police use of deadly force in the United States
