= Minneapolis shooting =

Minneapolis shooting may refer to:

- 2012 Minneapolis firm shooting
- 2015 Minneapolis shooting
- 2016 Minneapolis shooting
- 2024 Minneapolis shooting
- 2025 Annunciation Catholic Church shooting

== See also ==
- List of killings by law enforcement officers in Minnesota
