= Minnesota Statutes =

Set of laws

- Publisher: The Office of the Revisor of Statutes, Minnesota Legislature
- Published: Biennially
- Media type: Electronic; hard-bound

Minnesota Statutes are a compilation of the official laws of the U.S. state of Minnesota. Minnesota Statutes comprise only the general and permanent laws of the state. The Office of the Revisor of Statutes publishes a complete set of statutes in odd-numbered years.

== Chapters and sections ==
Minnesota Statutes are divided into several topical chapters, numbering from 1 to 648. Each chapter is organized into sections. Proper citations are "Minnesota Statutes, chapter 335" or "Minnesota Statutes, section 335.05" when referring to a specific section. Minnesota Statutes do not include provisions of the Minnesota Constitution, temporary laws, acts of appropriations, and local ordinances.

The Office of the Revisor of Statutes publishes Minnesota Statutes electronically and prints books every two years, but a supplement may be issued in the interim year.

== Other laws of Minnesota ==
The Minnesota Constitution is the supreme law in the state. Minnesota Statutes are the general and permanent laws of the state. Minnesota Laws (also referred to as Minnesota Session Laws, Laws of Minnesota, or simply "session laws") are the annual compilation of acts passed by the Minnesota Legislature and signed by the governor of Minnesota, or enacted by the legislature when overriding a governor's veto. Laws of a permanent nature are codified into Minnesota Statutes. Minnesota Laws may also include uncodified laws, local laws, appropriations, and proposed state constitutional amendments. A proper citations is "Laws of Minnesota 1988, chapter 469, article 1, section 1". The Office of the Revisor of Statutes publishes complications of Minnesota Statutes, Minnesota Laws, and Minnesota Rules.

== See also ==
- History of Minnesota
