= List of killings by law enforcement officers in Minnesota =

This is a list of notable homicides, the act of a person or persons killing another, committed by law enforcement officers in the U.S. state of Minnesota. Cases involve levels of Police brutality. Note that this list does not include deaths where there is an on-going investigation without a conviction due to wikipedia's policy at WP:BLPCRIME. For this reason pending cases are typically not included in this list, and unsolved cases are only included when there is no living suspect.

== List of killings ==
=== Law Enforcement (Police) ===
- Bloody Friday (Minneapolis) in Minneapolis on July 20, 1934
- Killing of Fong Lee in Minneapolis on July 22, 2006
- Killing of Jamar Clark in Minneapolis on November 15, 2015
- Killing of Philando Castile in Falcon Heights on July 6, 2016
- Killing of Justine Damond in Minneapolis on July 15, 2017
- Murder of George Floyd in Minneapolis on May 25, 2020
- Killing of Dolal Idd in Minneapolis on December 30, 2020
- Killing of Daunte Wright in Brooklyn Center on April 11, 2021
- Killing of Winston Boogie Smith in Minneapolis on June 3, 2021
- Killing of Leneal Frazier in Minneapolis on July 6, 2021
- Killing of Amir Locke in Minneapolis on February 2, 2022
- Killing of Ricky Cobb II in Minneapolis on July 31, 2021

=== Immigration and Customs Enforcement (ICE) ===
- Killing of Renée Good in Minneapolis on January 7, 2026
- Killing of Alex Pretti in Minneapolis on January 24, 2026

== See also ==
- List of incidents of civil unrest in Minneapolis–Saint Paul
- Minneapolis shooting (disambiguation)
- Timeline of race relations and policing in Minneapolis–Saint Paul
