= Killing of Daunte Wright =

2021 police homicide in Minnesota, US

- Footage from Kimberly Potter's body camera of her holding a firearm during her shooting of Daunte Wright, April 11, 2021.
- Location of the incident in Brooklyn Center
- Location: 45°04′09.3″N 93°20′27.9″W; Brooklyn Center, Minnesota, U.S.
- Date: April 11, 2021; 5 years ago c. 2:00 p.m. CST (19:00 UTC)
- Attack type: Homicide by shooting, manslaughter, police brutality
- Deaths: Daunte Demetrius Wright
- Injuries: Alayna Albrecht-Payton
- Perpetrator: Kimberly Ann Potter
- Verdict: Guilty on both counts
- Convictions: First-degree manslaughter predicated on reckless use/handling of a firearm; Second-degree manslaughter
- Sentence: 2 years in prison (paroled after 1 1/3 years)
- Litigation: Civil lawsuits settled by Brooklyn Center: Wright's family for $3.25 million; Albrecht-Payton for $350,000; Tim Gannon for $55,000

On April 11, 2021, Daunte Wright, a 20-year-old American man, was fatally shot in Brooklyn Center, Minnesota, by police officer Kimberly Potter during a traffic stop and attempted arrest for an outstanding warrant. After a brief struggle with officers, Potter shot Wright in the chest once at close range. Wright then drove off a short distance until his vehicle collided with another and hit a concrete barrier. An officer administered CPR to Wright; paramedics were unable to revive him, and he was pronounced dead at the scene. Potter said she meant to use her service Taser, shouting "Taser! Taser! Taser!" just before mistakenly firing her service pistol instead.

The shooting sparked protests in Brooklyn Center and renewed ongoing demonstrations against police shootings in the Minneapolis–Saint Paul metropolitan area, leading to citywide and regional curfews. Demonstrations took place over several days, and spread to cities across the United States. Two days after the incident, Potter and Brooklyn Center police chief Tim Gannon resigned from their positions.

Potter was convicted of first-degree manslaughter and second-degree manslaughter at a jury trial in Hennepin County. She received a two-year sentence, of which she served 16 months incarcerated. Wright's family settled a wrongful death lawsuit with the City of Brooklyn Center for $3.25 million. The passenger in Wright's car, who was injured in the collision, settled a civil suit with the city for $350,000.

Public outrage over Wright's death, one of several high-profile police killings of black Americans in the early 2020s, helped advance discussion of police reform measures. In Brooklyn Center, the police department changed its policy on arresting people for misdemeanor offenses and city council introduced alternative public safety measures, but several proposed reforms failed to be implemented. In Minnesota and elsewhere in the United States, Wright's death led to changes in Taser procedures and other policing policies.

== People involved ==
Daunte Wright

Daunte Demetrius Wright (October 27, 2000 – April 11, 2021) was a 20-year-old living in Minneapolis, having moved there from Chicago. He was the son of a black father and a white mother. Wright played basketball in high school, but according to his father, he dropped out due to a learning disability about two years before the shooting. He worked in retail and fast-food jobs to support his almost-two-year-old son, and had enrolled in a vocational school.

At the time of the shooting, 48-year-old Kimberly Ann Potter, from Champlin, Minnesota, was a police officer in the Brooklyn Center Police Department, and a mother of two sons. She had worked for the department since 1995, shortly after finishing at Saint Mary's University of Minnesota a year prior in 1994. Potter, a field training officer, was training a new officer at the time of the incident. She had completed annual re-certifications for her weapons with her most recent Taser certification having been completed on March 2, 2021.

Alayna Albrecht-Payton, a 20-year-old resident of Saint Paul, Minnesota, and Wright's girlfriend, was sitting in the passenger's seat of the vehicle and was injured in the crash. Two other Brooklyn Center police officers were involved in the traffic stop. One of them was a trainee working with Potter who also participated in the attempted arrest.

== Incident ==
1 Wright pulled over, shot
2 Wright crashed car, pronounced dead

External videos
- Raw footage of the shooting from Potter's body camera on YouTube (56 s)

=== Traffic stop ===
On April 11, 2021, Wright was driving with Albrecht-Payton in a white 2011 Buick LaCrosse that was registered to his brother. They were on their way to a car wash. Kimberly Potter was a passenger in a patrol car with a trainee officer who observed Wright's vehicle signaling a right turn while it was in a left-turning lane. The trainee officer also noticed that the vehicle had an expired registration tag on its license plate and had an air freshener hanging from the car's rearview mirror, a violation of Minnesota law. At 1:53 p.m. local time, the trainee officer initiated a traffic stop of Wright's vehicle on 63rd Avenue North near Orchard Avenue and called for backup.

After pulling the vehicle over, the trainee officer approached Wright's vehicle. Wright provided his name but did not have a driver's license or proof-of-insurance card. The trainee officer returned to his squad car. Meanwhile, Wright phoned his mother. Potter's supervisor arrived on the scene, and the officers ran Wright's name through a police database. They learned he had an open arrest warrant for failing to appear in court on a gross misdemeanor weapons violation for carrying a gun without a permit, and that there was a protective order against him by an unnamed woman. The officers decided to arrest Wright and ensure the passenger was not the same woman who had the protective order against him.

Police body camera footage showed Potter, her supervisor, and the trainee officer approaching the car. The trainee officer approached the driver's side door and the supervisor approached the passenger's side door. Potter, who was acting as a field training officer, initially stood back. The trainee officer informed Wright that there was a warrant for his arrest. He opened the driver's side door and Wright stepped out of the car. The car door remained open while Wright put his hands behind his back and the trainee officer attempted to put on handcuffs.

After several moments, Potter approached Wright and the trainee and unsnapped her handgun holster. She grabbed a piece of paper from the trainee with her right hand, then moved it to her left hand. Wright, who was unarmed, began to resist arrest, struggled with the officers, broke free, and stepped back into his car. The supervisor had the passenger's side door open, and reached inside to prevent Wright from putting the car in gear. The trainee officer on the driver's side attempted to prevent Wright from obtaining control of the steering wheel. Potter, who had her Taser holstered on her left side and her gun on her right, said, "I'll tase you," and then at 2:02 p.m. yelled, "Taser! Taser! Taser!" The supervisor released his hands from attempting to restrain Wright. A second later Potter then discharged her firearm, instead of her Taser, a single time using her right hand. The bullet struck Wright in the chest.

Potter's pistol, a Glock 9 mm model, was entirely black, partially made of metal, and weighed 2.11 pounds (0.96 kg) when loaded. Her Taser, made of plastic, was mostly yellow, and weighed 0.94 pounds (0.43 kg). Potter was holding her gun for 5.5 seconds before discharging it. Immediately after shooting Wright, she was still holding the piece of paper with her left hand.

As Wright sped off in his vehicle, body camera footage recorded as Potter said to the other officers, "Oh shit, I just shot him." (Note: The Star Tribune says Potter said, "Holy shit! I just shot him.") Potter continued, "I grabbed the wrong fucking gun", as she collapsed to the curb and placed her head in her hands. She later added, "I'm going to prison. I just killed a boy."

=== Car crash ===
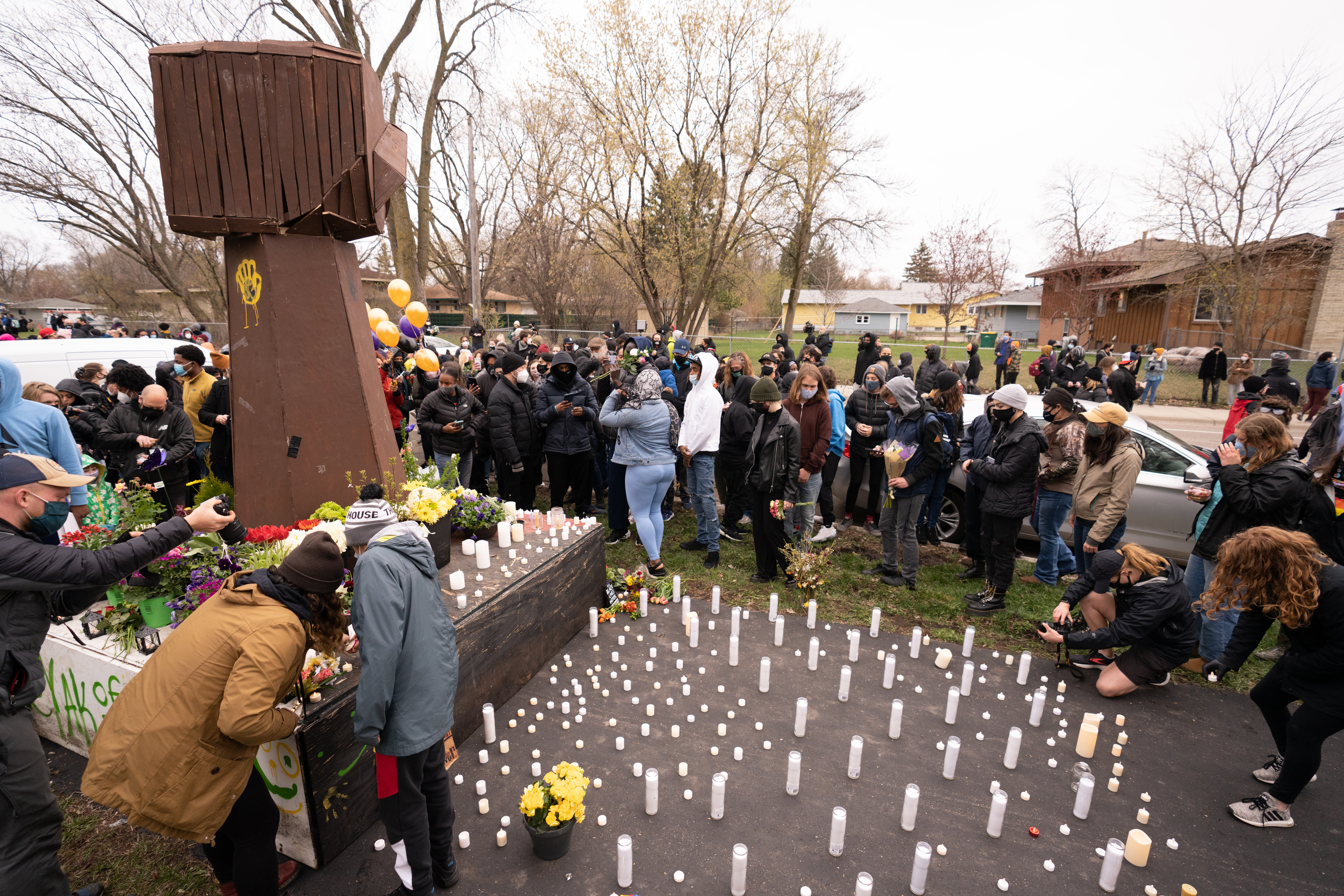
On April 12, 2021, people gather at the location of Wright's death the day prior.

Wright, who had driven off after being shot, traveled for about 470 feet (140 m) when his vehicle collided with another near the intersection of 63rd Avenue North and Kathrene Drive. After the crash, one officer approached Wright's vehicle with a gun drawn. Another officer checked Wright's pulse and, after not detecting one, administered cardiopulmonary resuscitation (CPR) while they awaited the arrival of paramedics. Upon arrival the paramedic crew took over Wright's care, but further attempts to revive him were unsuccessful and he was pronounced dead at the scene at 2:18 p.m., 16 minutes after being shot. Albrecht-Payton, the passenger in Wright's vehicle, was transported to a nearby hospital with non-life-threatening injuries. No one in the other vehicle was injured.

== Investigations and criminal charges ==
=== Brooklyn Center police response ===
Brooklyn Center Police Station, April 12, 2021.

On the morning of April 12, Brooklyn Center police chief Tim Gannon held a press conference and played a clip of the body camera footage. He said Potter intended to use a Taser on Wright, but pulled out and discharged her gun instead. Potter was placed on administrative leave by the Brooklyn Center police pending further investigation.

On April 13, Potter and Gannon submitted their resignations to the Brooklyn Center police department, with Potter's letter stating that it was "in the best interest of the community, the department, and my fellow officers if I resign immediately". The Brooklyn Center City Council had recommended their firing during an emergency meeting on April 12. According to The Independent, Potter fled her home for safety reasons after her address was leaked on social media. Police established a security presence around the house and erected cement barricades and fencing.

=== State and county investigation ===
The Minnesota Bureau of Criminal Apprehension (BCA) launched an investigation into the killing of Wright on April 12, per standard procedure, and released Potter's name as the officer who shot Wright. The Hennepin County medical examiner's office released a report on April 12 that determined the manner of death to be homicide and concluded that Wright had died as the result of a gunshot wound of the chest. In order to avoid conflicts of interest, although the incident took place in Hennepin County, it was reviewed by the Washington County Attorney's Office per an agreement with metropolitan counties to handle officer-involved shootings. Brooklyn Center Mayor Mike Elliott called on Governor Tim Walz to reassign the case to the office of the State Attorney General Keith Ellison.

=== Arrest and criminal charges ===
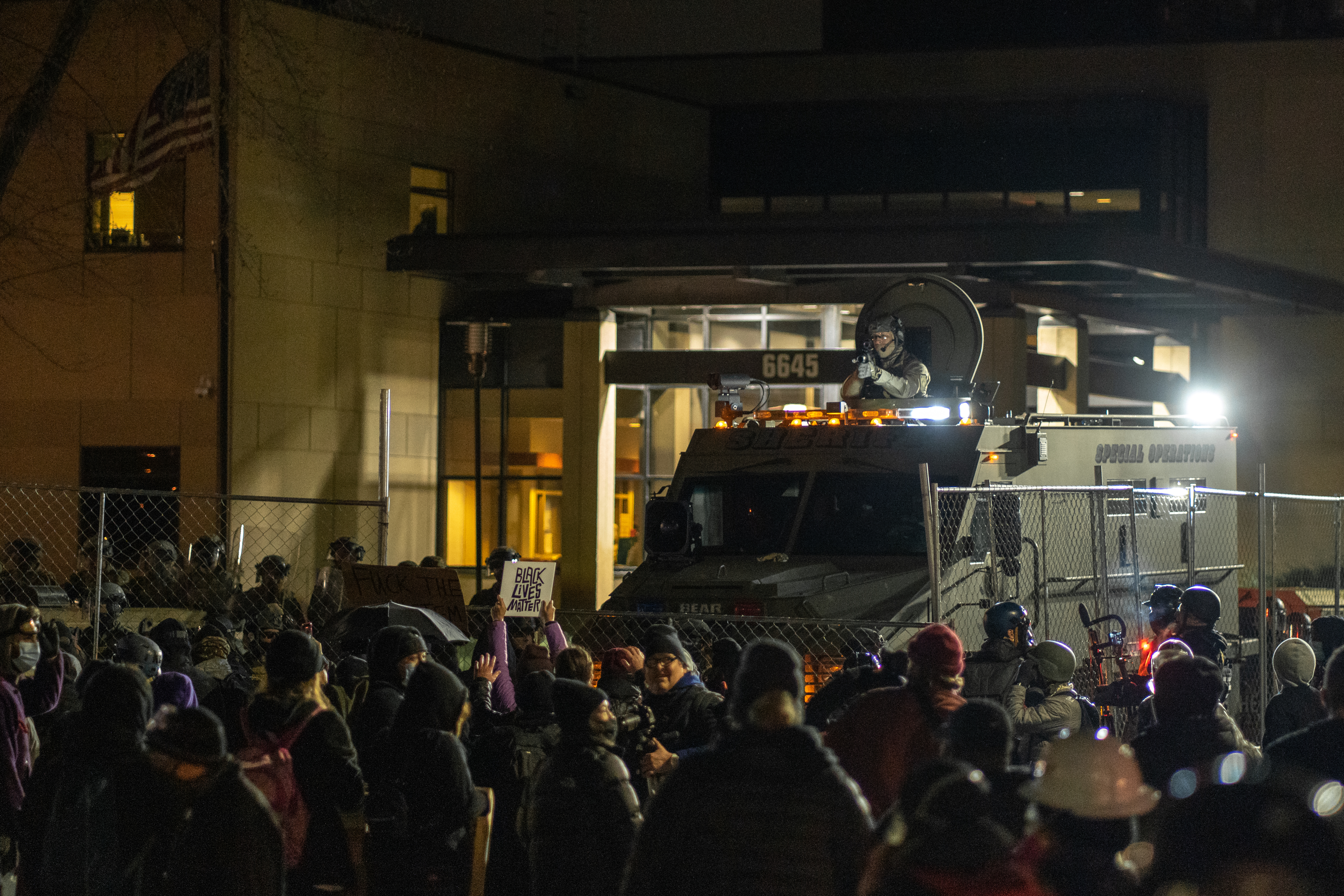
Protesters and Minnesota National Guard troops at the Brooklyn Center Police Station the night of April 14, 2021.

The Washington County Attorney's Office charged Potter on April 14 with second-degree manslaughter, pursuant to Minnesota Statutes, section 609.205, a felony offense entailing "culpable negligence creating unreasonable risk" that carries a maximum penalty of 10 years incarceration and/or a $20,000 fine. The criminal complaint against Potter stated that she caused Wright's death "by her culpable negligence," whereby she "created an unreasonable risk and consciously took a chance of causing death or great bodily harm" to Wright.

After her indictment, Potter was arrested, booked into a Hennepin County jail and released a few hours later after posting a $100,000 bail bond. Potter briefly made her first court appearance via Zoom on April 15 before Hennepin County Judge Regina Chu. Potter was represented by Earl Gray, a Saint Paul-based attorney who also defended Thomas Lane and Jeronimo Yanez, who were involved with the murder of George Floyd and killing of Philando Castile, respectively.

After making a charging decision, the Washington County Attorney's Office returned the case to Hennepin County. State Attorney General Ellison's office, at the request of Hennepin County Attorney Michael O. Freeman, agreed to take over prosecution of the case. Ellison's office on September 2 added the charge of first-degree manslaughter, predicated on reckless use/handling of a firearm, a more serious charge than second-degree manslaughter and carrying a maximum penalty of 15 years in prison and a $30,000 fine.

== Protests and unrest ==
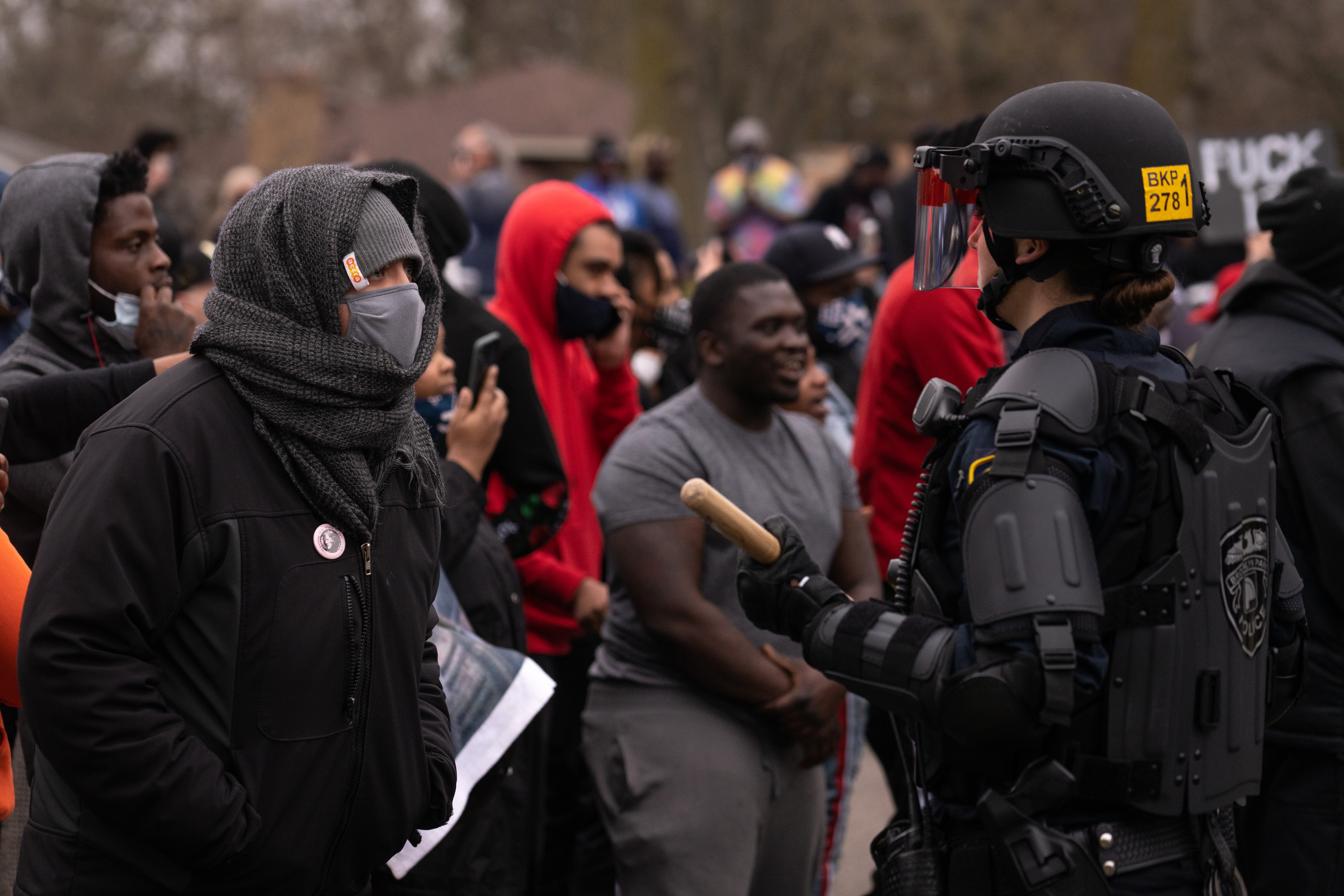
Protesters gather near the location in Brooklyn Center where Wright died, on the evening of April 11, 2021.

Wright's death occurred during a period of national reckoning on racial injustice and police brutality sparked by the police murder of George Floyd, an unarmed black man, in Minneapolis on May 25, 2020. The criminal trial of Derek Chauvin, the police officer who murdered Floyd, was about to enter its third week when Wright was fatally shot on Sunday, April 11, 2021, in Brooklyn Center, a suburban city adjacent to Minneapolis. Like Floyd's murder, Wright's killing furthered public discussion about police training and accountability and renewed focus on the Black Lives Matter movement.

Following the shooting, mourners and protesters gathered near the scene to demand justice for Wright. Several protesters came from another rally against police violence, organized by families of people who had been killed, earlier in the day in nearby Saint Paul, Minnesota. Officers with riot control equipment arrived, formed a line, and moved in when demonstrators began climbing on police vehicles and throwing bricks. Police fired tear gas into the crowd and used non-lethal ammunition. There were also reports of looting, damaged property, and vandalized police vehicles. After the crowd moved to outside a police precinct, the police announced that the gathering was an unlawful assembly, and threatened arrest for anyone who did not leave. When the people did not disperse, police fired tear gas, flashbangs, and rubber bullets. Mayor Mike Elliott imposed a curfew until 6 a.m. the next morning and closed schools for the following day. The next day, April 12, protests spread to nearby locations in the Minneapolis-Saint Paul metropolitan area and then to other cities in the United States. Governor Tim Walz implemented another curfew in several counties spanning the night of April 12 through the morning of April 13 and deployed the Minnesota National Guard while Minneapolis Mayor Jacob Frey declared a state of emergency and a citywide curfew.

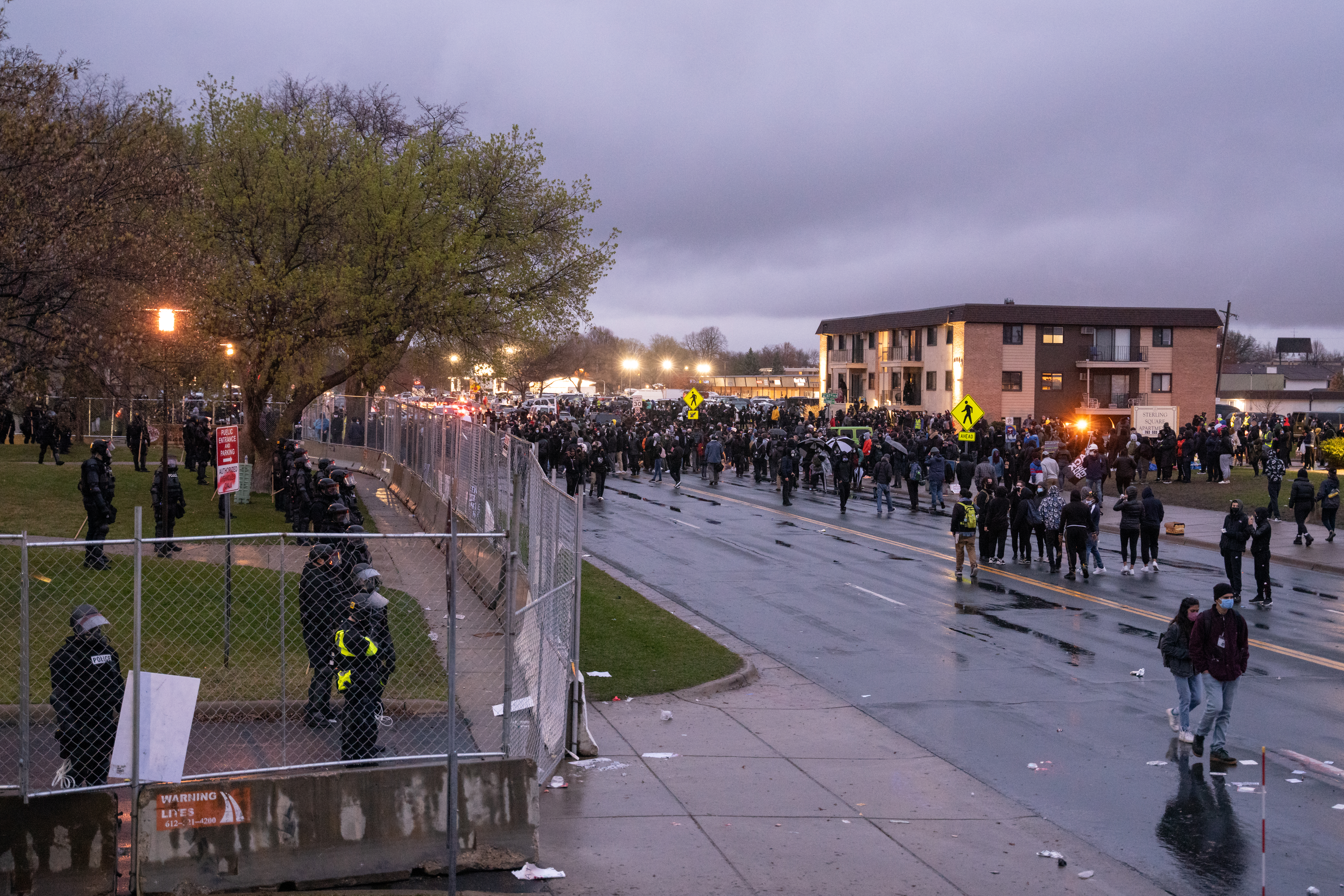
Protest at Brooklyn Center police station, April 12, 2021.

Protests, civil unrest, curfews, and clashes with police continued for the next several days in Brooklyn Center and around Minneapolis-Saint Paul. Law enforcement in Brooklyn Center established a heavily fortified barrier area and periodically clashed with demonstrators. Air fresheners became a symbol at protests and rallies over Wright's death, referring to one of the violations police alleged Wright committed the day of the shooting. Protesters demanded justice for Wright's death and made several demands of public officials, including a murder charge for Potter, an independent investigation of the shooting, and enactment of police reform measures. In media interviews, Wright's family thanked people for protesting and advocating for justice and encouraged people to protest peacefully. Demonstrations resumed during the trial of Kimberly Potter in late 2021.

== Reactions ==
=== Public officials ===
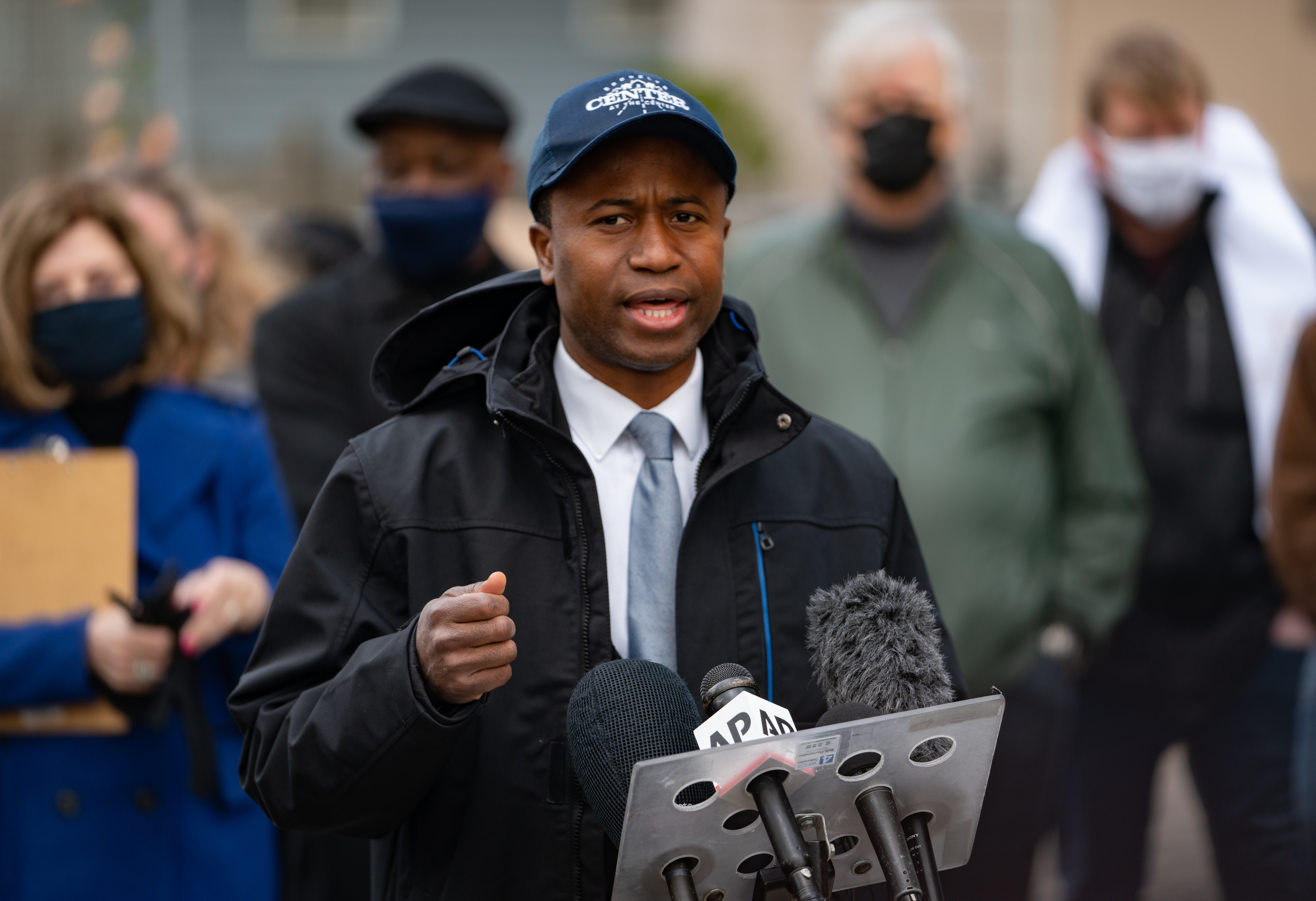
Brooklyn Center Mayor Mike Elliot, April 20, 2021.

Brooklyn Center Mayor Mike Elliott issued several statements on social media and at press conferences beginning the evening of the incident, expressing sympathy, urging protesters to remain peaceful, and suggesting that Potter should be fired. Minnesota Governor Tim Walz, Lt. Governor Peggy Flanagan, and Senator Tina Smith made statements mourning Wright's death and commenting on the pattern of unarmed Black men killed by law enforcement.

City Manager Curt Boganey was fired on April 12, giving Mayor Elliott command authority over the city police force. The following day, Police Chief Tim Gannon announced his resignation, alongside that of Potter.

President Joe Biden said about the incident and unrest, "Peaceful protest is understandable. And the fact is that we do know that the anger, pain and trauma that exists in Black community in that environment is real – it's serious, and it's consequential. But that does not justify violence. We should listen to Daunte's mom who is calling for peace and calm." Vice President Kamala Harris said "Daunte's family ... needs answers" on Twitter.

=== Public figures and institutions ===
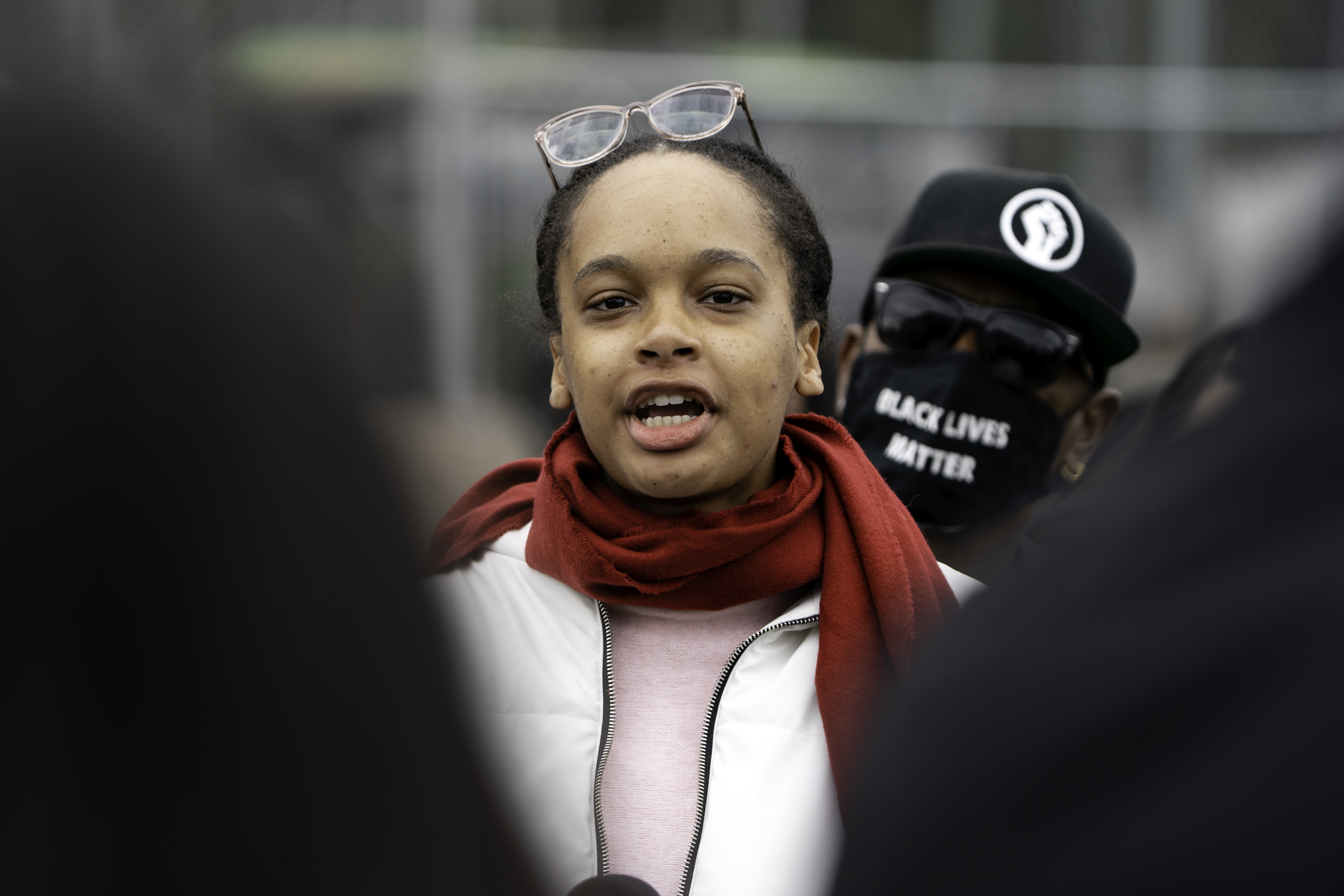
Minnesota NAACP president Angela Rose Myers, April 14, 2021

The NAACP released a statement saying "Whether it be carelessness and negligence, or a blatant modern-day lynching, the result is the same. Another Black man has died at the hands of police." Angela Rose Myers, president of the organization's Minnesota chapter, said at a press conference, "Black leaders are not playing, we are done dying in Minnesota."

Referring to controversy surrounding traffic stops due to small objects dangling from rear-view mirrors, the American Civil Liberties Union said it had "deep concerns that police here appear to have used dangling air fresheners as an excuse for making a pretextual stop, something police do all too often to target Black people."

Former President Barack Obama tweeted that "Our hearts are heavy over yet another shooting of a Black man, Daunte Wright, at the hands of police. It's important to conduct a full and transparent investigation, but this is also a reminder of just how badly we need to reimagine policing and public safety in this country." Al Sharpton said: "You can die for having expired tags or for a phony 20 dollar bill or you may have not even known it was a phony 20 dollar bill. It wouldn't happen in any other community."

Archbishop Bernard Hebda of the Catholic Archdiocese of Saint Paul and Minneapolis offered prayers and condolences to all parties concerned, adding: "While early indications point towards the shooting being accidental, I encourage allowing investigators from the [BCA] to complete a thorough investigation before coming to any personal judgments as to what occurred."

The Minnesota Vikings released a statement which said in part: "This avoidable situation is yet another tragic reminder of the drastic need for change in law enforcement." The Minnesota Twins, Minnesota Timberwolves and Minnesota Wild all postponed games on April 12. At their game on April 13, the Timberwolves and the visiting Brooklyn Nets observed a moment of silence for Daunte Wright before the game while most players wore shirts that read "With Liberty and Justice FOR ALL".

Chuck Valleau, head of the Brooklyn Center police union, said, "The death of Daunte Wright is terrible. And the loss of our co-worker Kimberly Potter is also terrible for what she's going through as well."

=== Family ===
Soon after the incident, Wright's mother spoke with reporters and said her son had phoned her during the traffic stop. She said she had overheard what sounded like a scuffle and an officer saying, "Daunte, don't run" before the phone hung up, and that her son said he had been pulled over for having an air freshener hanging from his rear-view mirror.

Wright's parents appeared on Good Morning America on April 13. At a press conference the same day, his mother talked about seeing her son's body over FaceTime at a press conference on April 13. The girlfriend of George Floyd was also one of Wright's former teachers, and attended the press conference for support. Floyd had been murdered during an arrest by Derek Chauvin of the Minneapolis Police Department on May 25, 2020. Relatives of at least six black men killed by the police and a family member of Emmett Till, who was lynched in Money, Mississippi, in 1955, were also present.

== Memorials and funeral ==
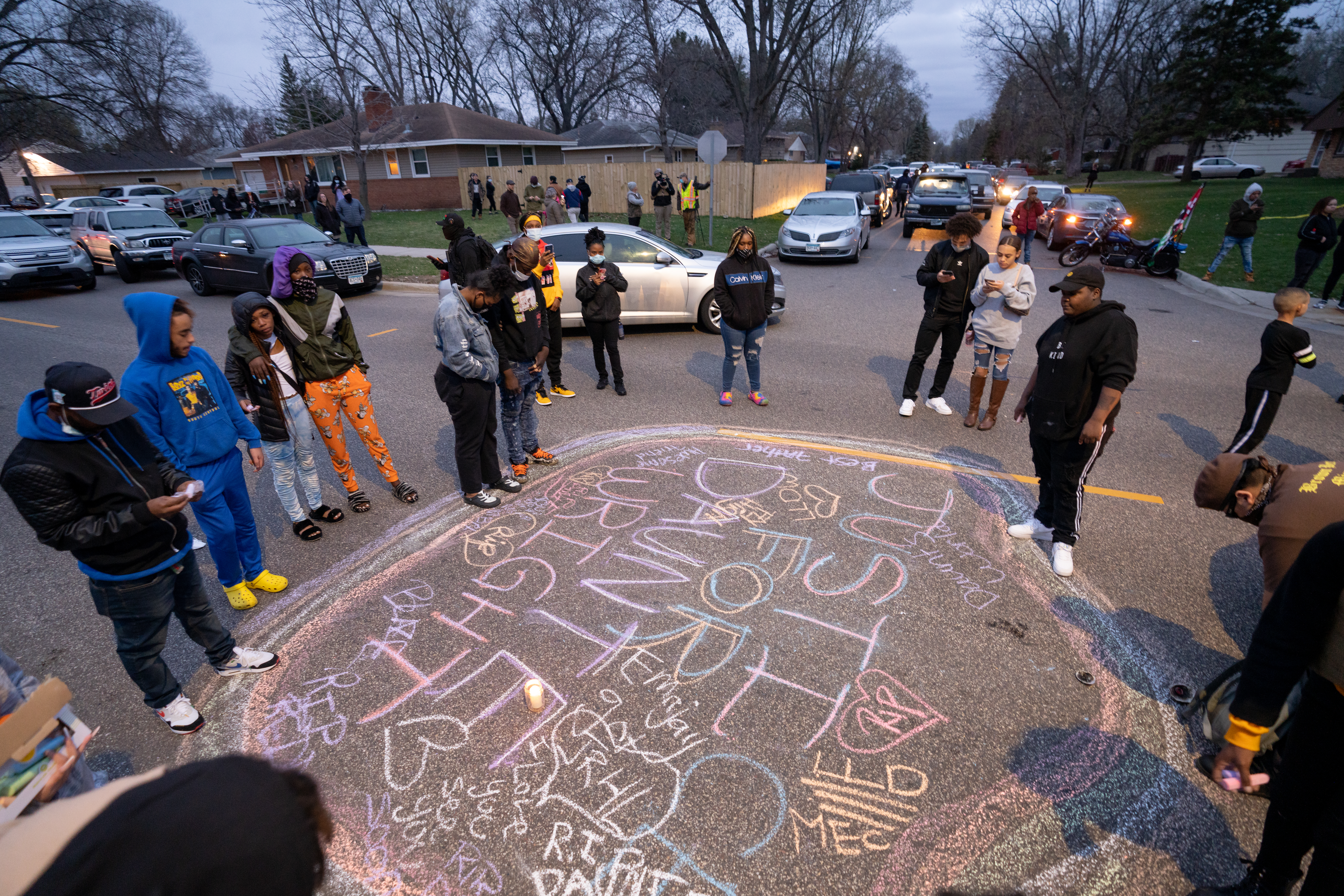
Vigil for Wright on April 11, 2021, down the road from where he was killed.

The evening of April 11, 2021, mourners and protesters held an evening vigil for Wright near the Brooklyn Center location where he was killed. On April 14, 2021, protesters put up a large, wooden sculpture of a raised fist at the 63rd Avenue North and Kathrene Drive intersection where the car driven by Wright collided with another vehicle. The sculpture had been displayed previously at George Floyd Square in Minneapolis, but it was replaced there by a version made of metal. People also placed memorials for Wright at the location he was shot and the location where he was pronounced dead.

Wright's funeral was held in Minneapolis on April 22, 2021. In attendance were relatives of Breonna Taylor, Philando Castile, and Oscar Grant—black Americans who had been killed by police over the past dozen years—and the family of Emmett Till, a black American who was lynched in 1955. The eulogy was delivered by Al Sharpton and jazz musician Keyon Harrold played an instrumental piece. Minnesota Governor Tim Walz, U.S. Senator Amy Klobuchar, and U.S. Representative Ilhan Omar attended the service. Walz issued a Minnesota proclamation that declared a moment of silence to coincide with the 12 p.m. start of the funeral.

In late 2023, the City of Brooklyn Center completed construction of a permanent memorial to Wright at 63rd Avenue North and Kathrene Drive to replace the fist sculpture and makeshift memorial that emerged soon after his death.

== Criminal trial ==
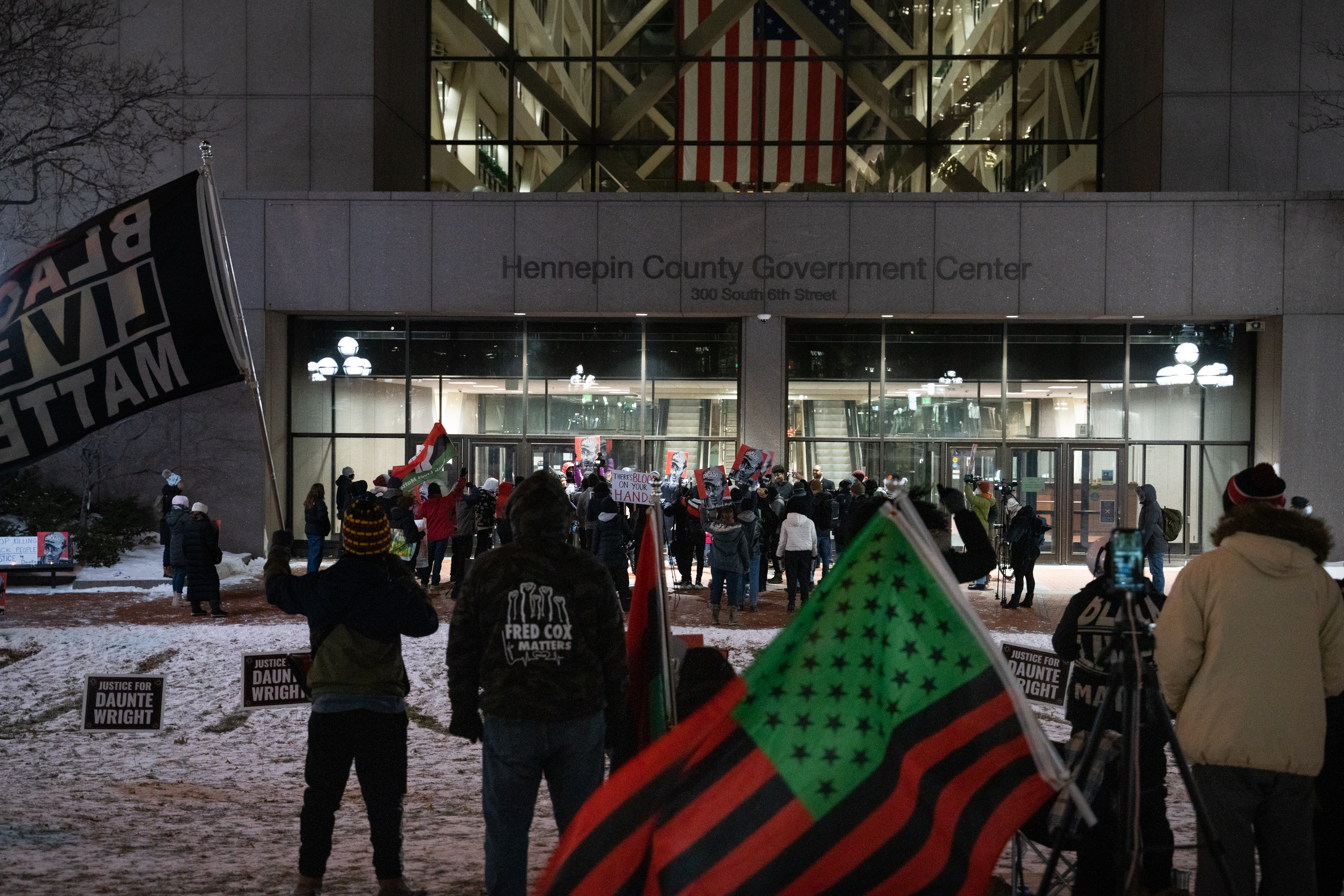
Demonstrators outside Hennepin County Government Center, December 11, 2021.

=== Pre-trial proceedings ===
Prosecutors filed the criminal case in Hennepin County District Court on April 14, 2021, as the State of Minnesota vs. Kimberly Potter. Prior to the start of the case, on November 2, Judge Chu ruled that defense attorneys would be allowed to introduce evidence of "slip and capture" errors, a kind of human error that occurs in times of high stress. Trial proceedings began on November 30 in Minneapolis, at a Hennepin County Government Center courtroom Chu presiding.

The Minnesota Attorney General's office served as the prosecution with Matthew Frank, an assistant attorney general, as the lead prosecutor. Frank was also the lead prosecutor in the trial of Derek Chauvin. Erin Eldridge, an assistant attorney general who also participated in the Chauvin trial, joined Frank. Amanda Montgomery, Paul Engh and Earl Gray represented Potter. Engh and Gray were part of the legal defense fund supplied by the Minnesota Police and Peace Officers Association.

Minnesota Statutes required that all parties in a trial to agree to the use of courtroom cameras. At the request of Potter's attorneys, Chu ruled on August 5 that cameras would not be permitted in the courtroom. On November 9, Chu reversed her earlier ruling to ensure "meaningful access" to the trial, as the courtroom was subject to attendance restrictions to prevent the spread of COVID-19. Chu also said her revised ruling was unrelated to a November 6 demonstration that occurred outside a house that protesters believed was Chu's.

=== Trial proceedings ===
Image shown at Potter's trial of her Taser (left) and her handgun (right).

Selection for the trial's twelve jurors and two alternative jurors took place from November 30 to December 3. Nine of the twelve jurors seated were white, similar to the demographics of Hennepin County, one was black and two were Asian, with the jury evenly split between men and women.

Opening statements in the trial began on December 8. Throughout the trial, the prosecution argued that Potter neglected training on use of her Taser and discharged her gun recklessly when she killed Wright. The defense argued that Wright resisted arrest, which contributed to a "slip and capture" error. Expert witnesses for the defense testified that Potter had the legal authority to fire either a gun or Taser. Potter testified in her defense, claiming that she mistook her gun for a Taser and admitting to fatally shooting Wright. She also said that she never observed Wright with a gun and that he was not being violent or making verbal threats during the arrest.

Attorneys gave closing arguments on December 20 and the jury, which was ordered to be sequestered, began deliberations by midday.

=== Verdict and sentence ===
After deliberating for 27 hours over four days, the jury found Potter guilty of first-degree manslaughter and second-degree manslaughter on December 23. Following the verdict, Potter was taken into custody and transferred to the state's Women's Correctional Facility in Shakopee.

Potter's sentencing hearing was held on February 18, 2022. Wright's mother, father, two siblings and the mother of his only child gave victim impact statements prior to Potter's sentencing being read. Wright's mother, Katie, said, "she [Potter] never once said his name. And for that I'll never be able to forgive you," addressing Potter. She continued, "I'll never be able to forgive you for what you've stolen from us." Potter, during her statement prior to the sentencing being read, apologized to Wright's family and to the community of Brooklyn Center, saying Wright "is not more than one thought away from my heart, and I have no right for that, for him to be in my heart."

Potter was sentenced to two years in prison, serving sixteen months with eight months of supervised release. The typical sentence for first-degree manslaughter in Minnesota is more than seven years in prison, with a maximum set at fifteen years. To pursue a longer sentence than what is typical requires the prosecution to demonstrate Blakely factors, or elements of a crime which make it particularly egregious. Despite initially arguing that the case had such factors which would justify a longer sentence, the prosecution stated in court on the day of the sentencing that the typical sentence would be appropriate. In explaining her sentencing decision, Chu said the case was unusual, and that Potter made a "tragic mistake" of thinking that she drew her taser instead of her firearm while in a chaotic situation. Chu expressed that it was "one of the saddest cases I've had on my 20 years on the bench".

In late 2022, the Minnesota Board of Pardons declined to consider Potter's application to have her sentence commuted. On April 24, 2023, Potter was released from prison, after serving 16 months of a two-year sentence. Minnesota Department of Corrections officials released her before dawn at 4:00 a.m. to avoid potential protests and after they received threats directed at Potter and her family. Potter's sentence required that she remain on supervised release for the remaining third of her sentence until its expiration on December 21, 2023.

== Civil lawsuits ==
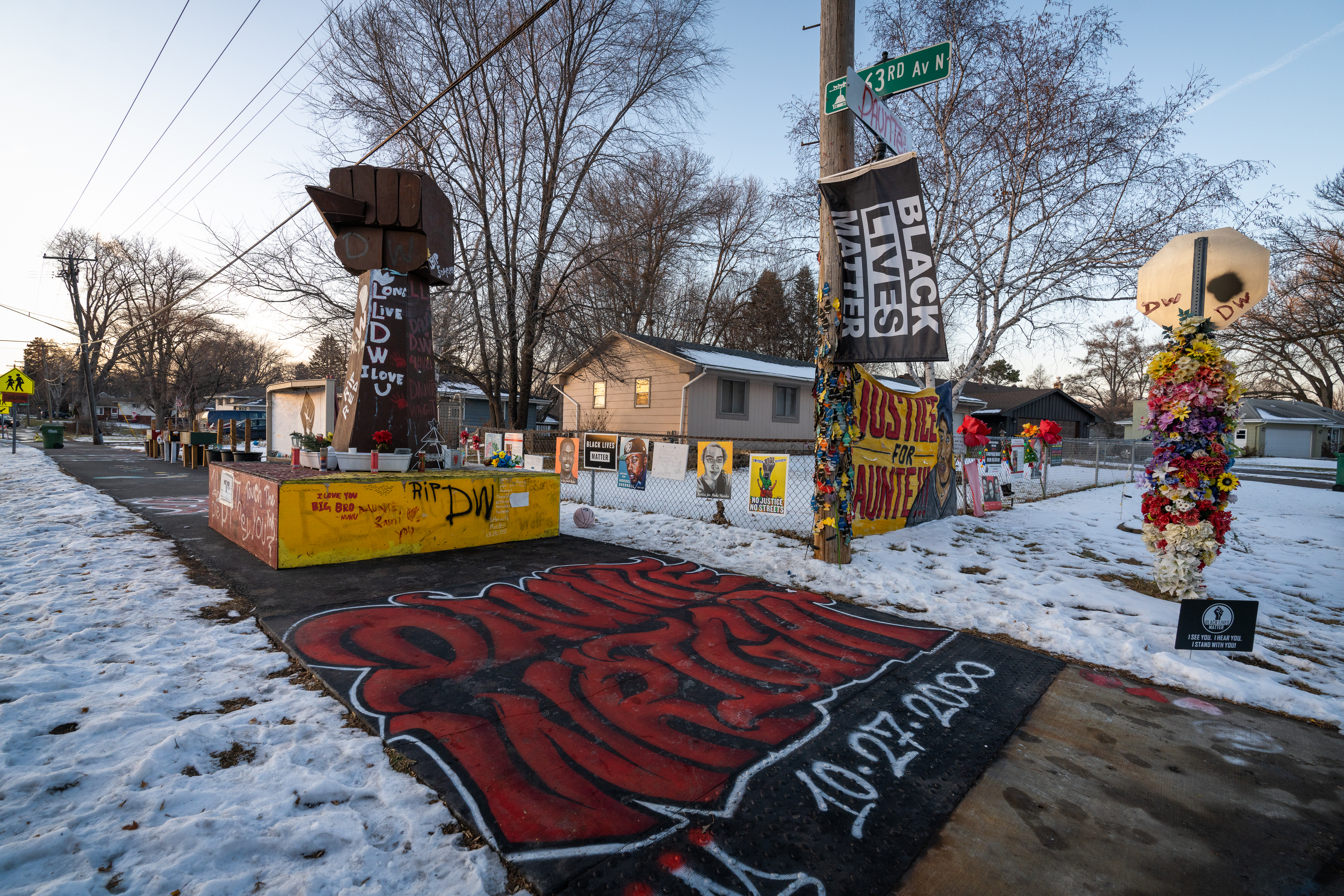
Makeshift memorial to Daunte Wright in Brooklyn Center, Minnesota, December 9, 2021.

Wright's family hired civil rights attorney Benjamin Crump, who represented the family of George Floyd in a settlement with the City of Minneapolis. They also obtained representation from attorneys Anthony Romanucci and Jeff Storms. In mid 2022, the City of Brooklyn Center settled a lawsuit brought by Wright's family and agreed to pay $3.25 million to them, the third largest civil rights wrongful death settlement in Minnesota, and the largest outside of Minneapolis. Terms of the settlement required the city to make changes to policing policies and improve officer training, and to establish a permanent memorial to Wright at the site of a temporary one that emerged in the days after his death.

Alayna Albrecht-Payton, the passenger in Wright's vehicle during the incident, filed a civil lawsuit against the city of Brooklyn Center. Albrecht-Payton had suffered a broken jaw when Wright's vehicle crashed. Her lawsuit said she experienced permanent physical injuries and psychological distress from the incident. The city settled the lawsuit with Albrecht-Payton in early 2023 for $350,000.

Wright's family returned to court in 2023 to resolve a dispute over the size of attorney fees and the distribution of settlement money. A judge ordered that Wright's son would receive a majority of the settlement, other family members would receive a partial distribution of it, and that attorney fees would be limited. As part of the prior civil settlement with Wright's family, the City of Brooklyn Center in mid 2023 commissioned a permanent, public memorial at 63rd Avenue North and Kathrene Drive at a cost of $243,000 to replace the makeshift one that emerged soon after his death.

Former police chief Tim Gannon settled a lawsuit with the city of Brooklyn Center for $55,000. Gannon did not immediately fire Potter from the police force in the immediate aftermath of Wright's death and he was given the option to either resign or be terminated. Gannon opted to resign, but his lawsuit claimed he was denied due process.

== Impact on policing ==
=== In Brooklyn Center ===
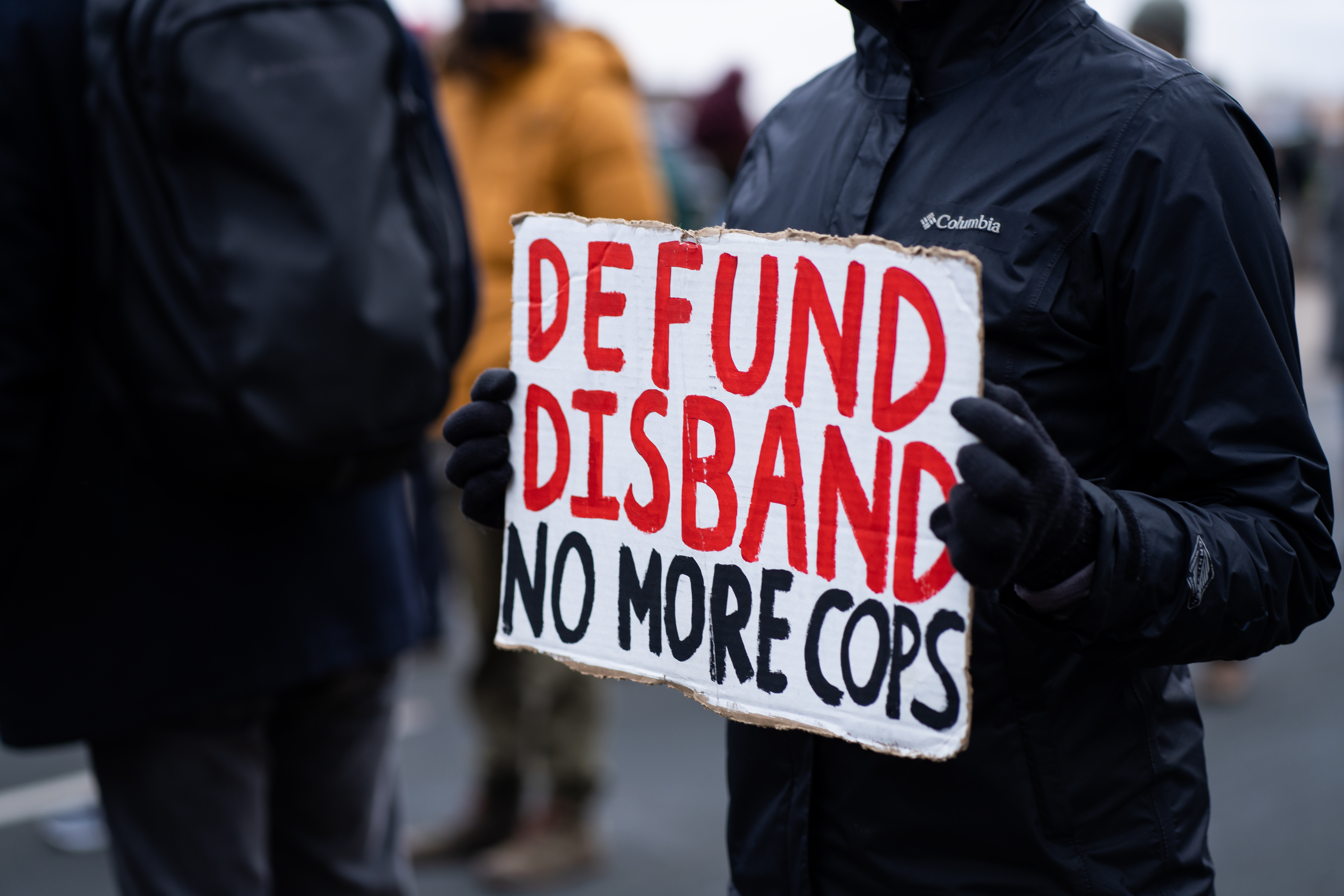
Protest sign at a demonstration in Brooklyn Center, Minnesota, April 14, 2021.

A month after his death, the city council passed an ordinance named after Daunte Wright and Kobe Dimock-Heisler, another black man who had been killed in an encounter with city police prior to Wright. The ordinance established a committee to help lead reform efforts. Proposed measures included creating unarmed traffic enforcement and community response teams, and prohibiting arrests or vehicle searches in certain traffic-related encounters. Wright's family believed that had such policies been in place when he was stopped by police, he would not have been killed.

Brooklyn Center officials announced a new policy in late 2021 to cite and release criminal offenders for misdemeanor and gross misdemeanor charges rather than take people into immediate custody. Under the policy, police officers would still be able to make an arrest if an offender posed a safety threat. The city's council also passed a $1.3 million plan for alternative public safety programs, such as the use of unarmed workers to enforce nonmoving traffic violations and mental health response teams—$303,114 of the project's budget came from eliminating three police officer positions.

Brooklyn Center Mayor Mike Elliot, who was a Liberian refugee, gained widespread attention in the aftermath of Wright's death and during the response to civil unrest. The public safety and police reform plan he put forward after Wright's death became a source of political controversy as it ultimately failed to be enacted into city law. Elliot was defeated in a re-election bid in the 2022 Minnesota elections by April Graves who criticized Elliot for failing to seek greater public input on police reform. Several years after Wright's death, several proposed reforms to police policy in Brooklyn Center had yet to be implemented. In January 2024, the city council rejected a resolution that would limited situations when police officers could initiate a traffic stop, such as for expired vehicle registration and for broken or inoperable components on the car.

=== Elsewhere in the United States ===
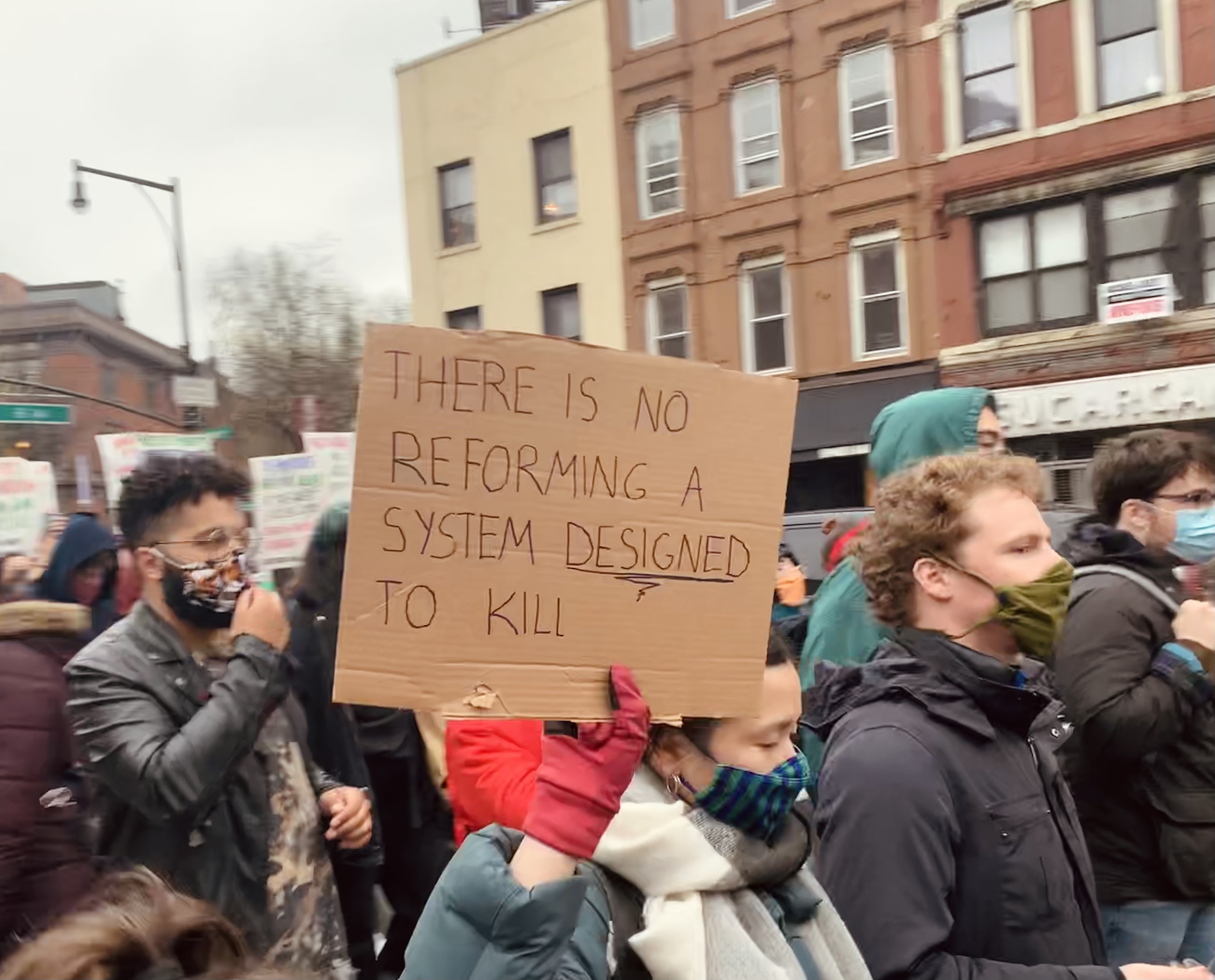
Protest sign at a demonstration in Berkeley, California, April 12, 2021.

According to the Star Tribune, by April 2021 there had been 16 known cases, including Potter's killing of Wright, when a police officer in the United States fired a pistol at someone but claimed to have intended to use a Taser instead. Other notable incidents included a 2002 shooting in Rochester, Minnesota, the fatal 2009 shooting of Oscar Grant by a Bay Area Rapid Transit officer in Oakland, California, and the deadly 2015 shooting of Eric Harris by a volunteer reserve deputy in Tulsa, Oklahoma. In two other situations compared to Potter—a 2018 shooting in Lawrence, Kansas, and a 2018 shooting in New Hope, Pennsylvania—officers had shouted "Taser" before firing their guns. In the days after Wright's death, the police departments of Roeland Park, Kansas, and St. Ann, Missouri, made changes to their Taser policies, with Roeland Park police saying they would cross draw Tasers with "no exceptions", and St. Ann police saying they would only use yellow Tasers and require officers to carry them opposite their main weapon. In Minnesota, Governor Tim Walz and Saint Paul Mayor Melvin Carter called for measures to better distinguish Tasers and firearms, as part of comprehensive police reform.

As one of several high-profile police killings of black Americans in the early 2020s, Wright's death led to the enactment of new laws and policies designed to restrict police use of lethal force and provide greater civilian oversight of policing. Minneapolis police announced they would not make traffic stops for minor infractions, such as expired vehicle tags or having objects hanging on mirrors. The Minnesota Board of Peace Officer Standards and Training approved in 2022 new rules to revoke officer licenses for conduct violations. In Illinois, state laws allowing officers to pull vehicles over for minor infractions faced scrutiny, and the Illinois General Assembly enacted an "air freshener" law, effective January 1, 2024, that prohibits law enforcement from conducting a traffic stop for an object hanging from a rearview mirror.

Some activists advocated for more even ambitious reform measures, such as abolishing or defunding the police. By the end of 2022, momentum behind police reform measures waned in many U.S. states. Law enforcement killings in the United States totaled at least 1,176 people in 2022, the deadliest year since a national database was created in 2013. Perry Bacon Jr., an opinion columnist with The Washington Post, argued in early 2023 that the protest movement of the law enforcement killings of black Americans failed to reduce such incidents and that both bold policy changes and more incremental reforms to policing had not been realized.

== See also ==
- 2020–2023 United States racial unrest
- List of killings by law enforcement officers in Minnesota
- List of unarmed African Americans killed by law enforcement officers in the United States
- Taser safety issues
