= List of Daunte Wright protests =

- Part of 2020–2021 United States racial unrest and Black Lives Matter movement
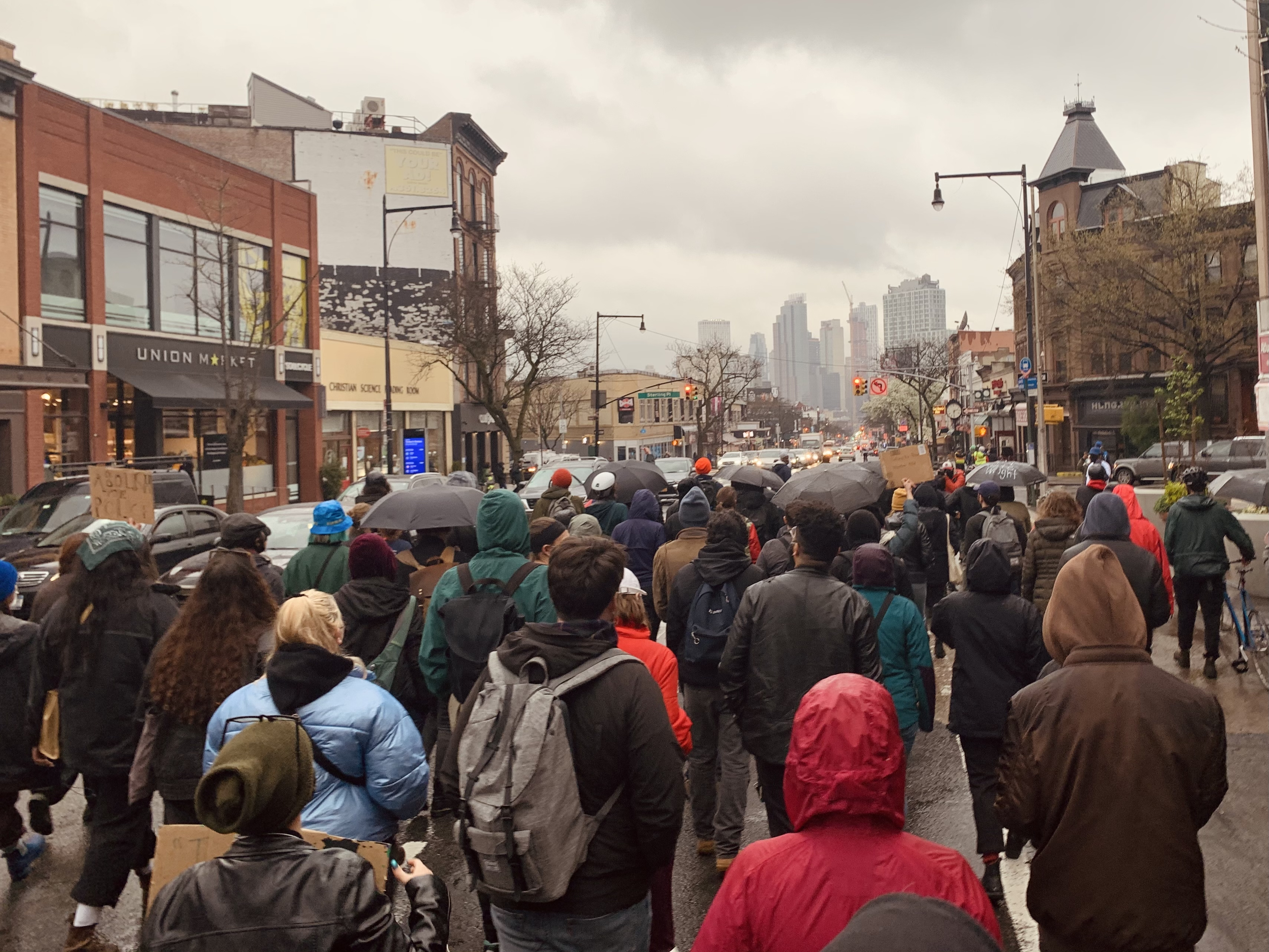
- Protest in New York City on April 12, 2021
- Date: April 11 – December 23, 2021 (8 months, 1 week and 5 days)
- Location: United States
- Caused by: Killing of Daunte Wright
- Methods: Protests, demonstrations, civil disobedience, civil resistance, looting, riots

Protests occurred at several locations in the United States in reaction to the killing of Daunte Wright, an unarmed 20-year-old African-American man who was fatally shot by a police officer in Brooklyn Center, Minnesota, on April 11, 2021. Protests over Wright's death began in Brooklyn Center the day of the fatal shooting. By April 12, protests had spread to other locations in the United States. Many demonstrations were part of the Black Lives Matter movement.

After a jury trial in a Minnesota district court, Kimberly Potter, the police officer who fatally shot Wright, was convicted of first-degree and second-degree manslaughter charges on December 23, 2021.

== List of protests in the United States ==
Alabama

- Mobile: The Party for Socialism and Liberation staged a protest at Mardi Gras Park on April 18.

Arizona

- Tucson: About 80 protesters gathered downtown on April 16.

Arkansas

- Little Rock: Over 60 protesters gathered outside of Little Rock City Hall on April 17.

California

- Bakersfield: Two protests occurred on April 17 near Bakersfield Police Department headquarters, one in the afternoon and one in the evening. Police said some public areas near the department building were vandalized during the protests.
- Los Angeles: About 100 protesters gathered in Hollywood on April 15, where they held a candlelight vigil at Sunset Boulevard and Vine Street at around 10 p.m. and then marched down streets.
- Napa: Protesters gathered outside of the Napa Police Department on April 17.
- Oakland: Activists held a candlelight vigil outside of Oakland City Hall on April 13.
- Sacramento: Dozens of protesters gathered at Cesar Chavez Plaza around 7 p.m. on April 13, then marched downtown. Police reported three instances of vandalism stemming from the event. Another protest would occur during the evening of April 24.
- San Diego: About 100 protesters assembled downtown on April 12.
- San Francisco: Protesters gathered outside Mission High School on April 15.
- San Jose: Protesters gathered outside police headquarters on April 12.

Colorado

- Denver: The Party for Socialism and Liberation staged a protest outside the Colorado State Capitol on April 17. Protesters placed paper depictions of gravestones, each labeled with the name of a person killed by police, along the building's west lawn. After around an hour, the group began marching along Colfax Avenue.

Connecticut

- New Haven: Protesters marched from the New Haven City Hall to Yale Police Department headquarters on April 18.
- Stamford: About 50 protesters marched down Washington Boulevard on April 17.

Florida

- Miami: Protesters gathered at The Torch of Friendship in Bayfront Park on April 18, holding signs and banging pots and pans. After gathering at The Torch of Friendship, protesters would march through nearby streets. By 3 P.M. local time, the group of protesters would grow from about a few dozen attendees to roughly 100.
- Orlando: About 25 protesters gathered outside of Orlando City Hall on April 15.
- St. Petersburg: About 100 protesters gathered outside City Hall on April 16.
- Tampa: Protesters gathered at Curtis Hixon Park on April 17.

Georgia

- Athens: About 100 protesters organized outside Athens City Hall and marched to the University of Georgia Arch on April 14.
- Atlanta: A march organized by the Party for Socialism and Liberation occurred on April 15 as protesters gathered in Downtown Atlanta and marched from Marietta Street and Centennial Park Drive through busy streets. Protesters marched from the Historic Fourth Ward Park to the BeltLine on April 16.

Illinois

- Belleville: Protesters marched down East Main Street on April 17.
- Chicago: About 75 protesters gathered around Cloud Gate in Millennium Park on April 13, then marched down Randolph Street before returning to Millennium Park. Over 700 protesters marched through Sheridan Road on April 18, stopping at the Weber Arch.
- Urbana: Students at the University of Illinois Urbana-Champaign held a candlelight vigil on the Main Quad on April 15.

Iowa

- Des Moines: About 300 protesters marched through the East Village on April 17, arriving at the Des Moines Police Department headquarters just before 6 p.m. There, they presented the police with a list of demands, which included the firing of some specific employees, the legalization and decriminalization of cannabis, and the defunding and abolition of the police department.

Kentucky

- Louisville: Protesters blocked traffic using chairs and tables on April 12.

Maryland

- Baltimore,: About 100 protesters gathered outside Baltimore Police Department headquarters on April 16 and then marched to President Street and Inner Harbor East, at some points stopping traffic. Protesters gathered outside of the Baltimore City Public Schools administration building on April 17.

Massachusetts

- Boston: About 150 protesters gathered outside of the Massachusetts State House on April 15. Hundreds of protesters gathered in Nubian Square in Roxbury on April 17. More than 100 protesters marched from the campus of the Massachusetts Institute of Technology (MIT) to Boston Common on April 18.
- Brockton: About 20 residents gathered for a candlelight vigil outside of police headquarters on April 16.
- Northampton: Protesters calling to defund the police gathered outside of the police station on April 17, shutting down Main Street. One protester attempted to knock down a metal barricade before being pulled away by another member of the group.

Michigan

- Detroit: About 200 protesters gathered in Clark Park on April 17.
- Grand Rapids: The group Justice for Black Lives staged a peaceful protest downtown on the night of April 16.
- Kalamazoo: About 30 protesters gathered outside of the Kalamazoo County Courthouse on April 12, where they spoke with the mayor and the public safety chief for around 40 minutes.

Minnesota

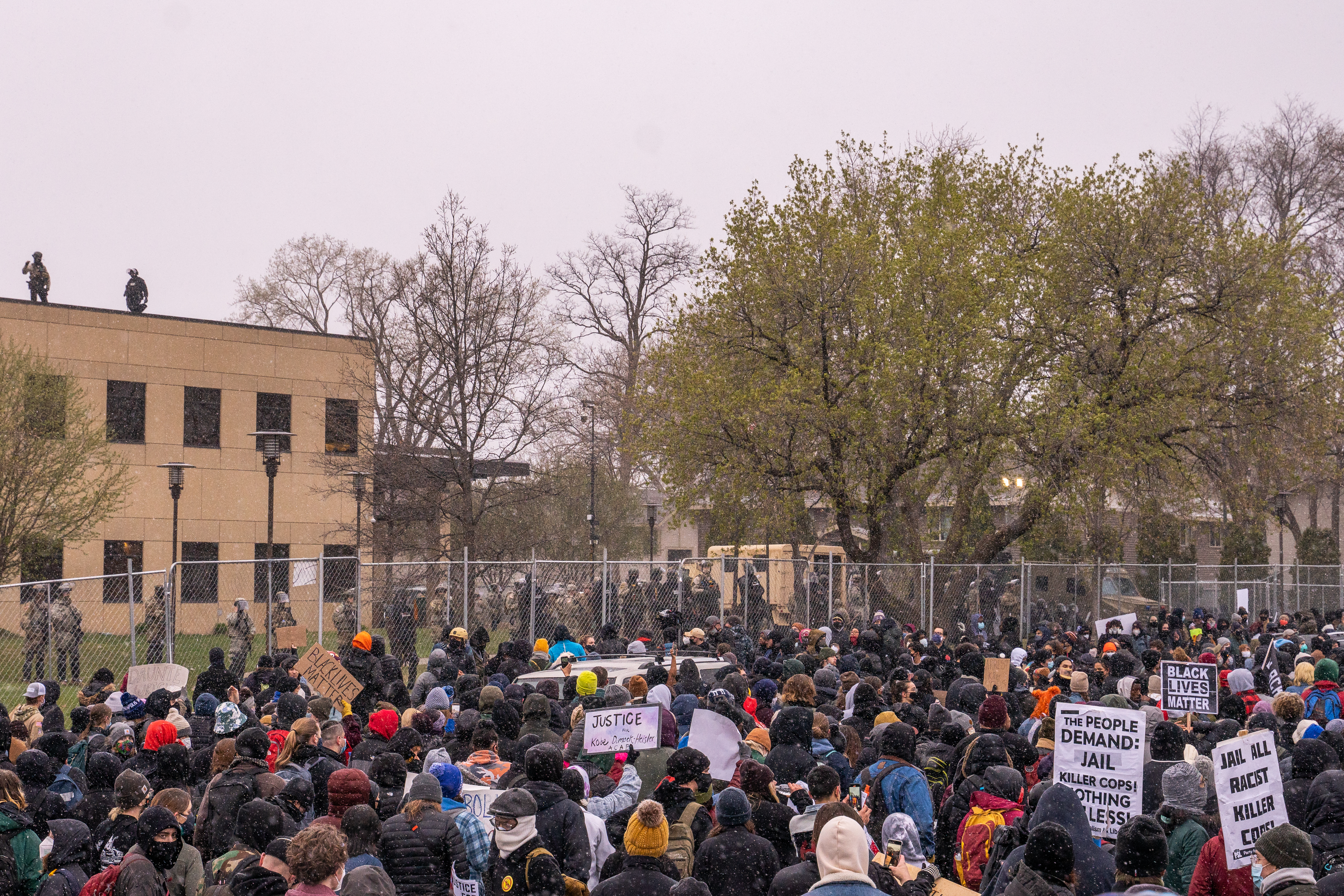
Protests outside of the police station in Brooklyn Center on April 13

- Brooklyn Center: See Daunte Wright protests
- Duluth: Members of the group Voices for Ethnic and Multicultural Awareness (VEMA) protested outside Duluth City Hall on April 12.
- Mankato: Dozens of protesters gathered beginning at 5 p.m. on April 12 at the Veterans Memorial Bridge and marched to the Mankato Public Safety Center. The protest was peaceful and lasted approximately an hour and 45 minutes. A walkout protest would be held by students at Mankato East High School on April 23 with a few dozen participants.
- Minneapolis–Saint Paul metropolitan area: See Daunte Wright protests
- St. Cloud: Around 100 protesters held a vigil in Seberger Park on April 16.

Missouri

- Kansas City: Protesters gathered outside of Country Club Plaza on April 12.
- Springfield: Protesters held a 30-minute long silent vigil on April 17.
- St. Louis: More than 100 Washington University in St. Louis students staged a protest on campus on April 16.

Montana

- Bozeman: Hundreds of protesters gathered in Bogert Park on April 18.

Nebraska

- Omaha: Protesters gathered at the intersection of Dodge Street and 72nd Street on April 12.

New Hampshire

- Manchester: About 200 protesters gathered for a candlelight vigil in Derryfield Park on April 17.

New Jersey

- Hackensack: About 200 demonstrators organized by the Bergen County NAACP rallied at the steps of the Bergen County Courthouse on April 17.

New Mexico

- Albuquerque: About 80 protesters gathered near the University of New Mexico bookstore on April 12.

New York

- Albany: Protesters beginning in Dana Park marched along Lark Street onto Henry Johnson Boulevard on April 12, stopping in front of police headquarters. Protesters peacefully marched from Townsend Park to the police department's South Station on April 15, where they had a confrontation with police.

Protests in New York City on April 12. Marchers chant "Daunte Wright, Michael Brown, shut the whole system down!"

- New York City: Dozens of protesters gathered in Washington Square Park on April 12. Later that evening, protesters would march across Manhattan Bridge and George Washington Bridge. About 150 cyclists staged a bike ride and vigil on April 13. New York City mayoral candidate Andrew Yang attempted to join the bike ride, but was heckled by members of the group. Eight black bloc protesters were arrested for vandalism carried out on the Upper East Side on April 14. Protesters blocked traffic on the New York side of the Holland Tunnel on the evening of April 15. Protesters held a vigil in Times Square on April 17.

Nevada

- Las Vegas: More than 100 protesters marched on the Las Vegas Strip on April 17.

North Carolina

- Fayetteville: More than 30 protesters gathered outside of Market House on April 16, which they began marching around at 6:15 p.m. for around 15 minutes.
- Raleigh: About 300 people would gather to host a vigil at Moore Square in downtown Raleigh on April 18 begging at 6 p.m. After a series of speeches were given by local activists relating to their personal experiences with police brutality, about 200 protesters would march through the streets chanting "no justice, no peace, abolish the police". During the first twenty minutes of the protest protesters would occasionally throw eggs at buildings and cars. In less than 5 minutes after the protests started a police van stopped behind the protesters telling them to get of the street and go on the sidewalk or be arrested. At 8:16 p.m. the protest was declared an lawfully assembly by the Raleigh Police Department. During that night, 12 protesters would be arrested and mostly charged with failing to disperse.

North Dakota

- Fargo: Community members gathered in Island Park for a candlelight vigil on April 16.

Ohio

- Cincinnati: About 100 protesters gathered outside of the Hamilton County Courthouse at 6 p.m. on April 15.
- Columbus: More than 80 protesters gathered in Mayme Moore Park in Downtown Columbus on April 13, where they then marched to Columbus Division of Police headquarters. Some protesters attempted to break into the building, which was locked by a pair of handcuffs; these protesters were repelled by police with pepper spray.
- Dayton: About a dozen protesters gathered near the former Dayton Unit NAACP building on West Third Street for less than an hour on April 14. Protesters gathered outside of the Walter H. Rice Federal Building and United States Courthouse on April 17.

Oregon

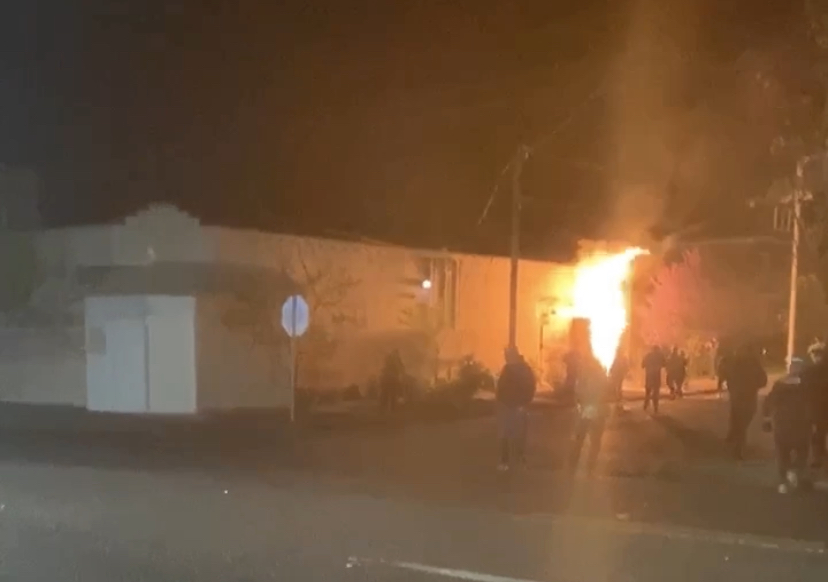
A building belonging to the Portland Police Association was burned by rioters on April 13.

- Portland: Protesters gathered in Laurelhurst Park for a vigil on April 12. Some of these protesters then marched toward a police precinct, where they broke windows, set a dumpster on fire, and set off fireworks, leading police to declare a riot and fire rubber bullets and stun grenades at the crowd. In a separate incident that same night, protesters broke windows and slashed tires at a building housing Portland Police Bureau traffic offices at the intersection of North Philadelphia Avenue and Syracuse Street. The following night, about 100 black bloc demonstrators gathered at Kenton Park. The protesters then marched to the Portland Police Association building, spray-painting it with "Daunte Wright" and "ACAB" and setting it on fire. Portland Police quickly declared the event a riot and engaged the crowd, making one arrest.

Pennsylvania

- Lancaster: Protesters gathered for a candlelight vigil on April 14.
- Philadelphia: Hundreds of protesters marched through streets peacefully on the night of April 13. Dozens more protested in Center City on April 17.
- Pittsburgh: Dozens of protesters gathered in East Liberty on April 13, marching from the intersection of Centre Avenue and Penn Avenue to Point Breeze before returning. While in Point Breeze, the protesters stopped for around 20 minutes outside of the house of Mayor Bill Peduto.
- State College: A group called the 3-20 Coalition staged a protest on April 13.
- Upper Darby: A small group protested at the intersection of Lansdowne Avenue and State Road on April 14.

Rhode Island

- Providence: About 600 protesters gathered outside of the Rhode Island State House on April 15.

South Carolina

- Columbia: About 40 protesters marched outside of the South Carolina State House on April 18.

South Dakota

- Sioux Falls: A group of approximately 60 people marched and rallied in downtown on April 18.

Texas

- Austin: About 50 protesters gathered around The Tower of the University of Texas at Austin at 7 p.m. on April 15 and marched down Speedway, dispersing around 9:30 p.m. Roughly a dozen protesters would gather in Alderbrook Pocket Park located in Northwest Austin at a rally organized by Black Lives Matter Austin during the afternoon of April 24.
- Dallas: More than 100 protesters gathered outside of Dallas Police Department headquarters on April 13. On April 17, two rallies were held as protesters marched through the streets and outside Dallas City Hall.

Vermont

- Burlington: More than 200 protesters gathered for a vigil on April 14.

Virginia

- Richmond: Protests occurred on April 15 and 16 in Monroe Park near the campus of Virginia Commonwealth University.
- Roanoke: Protesters gathered on April 16.

Washington

- Seattle: Protesters marched from Occidental Park on April 12, where they held a candlelight vigil and later vandalized buildings along Fifth Avenue. A group held a vigil on April 13.

Washington, D.C.

- Washington, D.C.: Protesters marched through the city on April 13. A statue of Christopher Columbus was vandalized on April 17.

West Virginia

- Morgantown: About 200 protesters gathered outside of the Monongalia County Courthouse on April 15.

Wisconsin

- La Crosse: A student-led group of about 100 protesters marched through downtown La Crosse on April 15.
- Madison: Protesters gathered outside of the Wisconsin State Capitol on April 17.
- Milwaukee: The group Peoples Revolution Milwaukee, which has staged events for the duration of the George Floyd protests, held their 318th consecutive "day of action" on April 12, which experienced higher turnout following Wright's killing. The group marched around Borchert Field and at one point crossed Interstate 43, causing the Milwaukee County Sheriff's Office to shut down traffic.
- Racine: Protesters marched downtown on the evening of April 13.

== See also ==
- 2020–2021 United States racial unrest
- List of George Floyd protests in the United States
