= Action slip =

Error in executing an action

An action slip is an error in the execution of an intended action, typically occurring during routine or automatic tasks, where the performed action deviates from the intended goal. These errors, also referred to as "slips" in cognitive psychology, are often caused by lapses in attention, habitual behavior, or environmental factors, such as poorly designed interfaces or similar objects. Unlike a Freudian slip, which is interpreted as revealing unconscious desires in psychoanalytic theory, action slips are explained through cognitive and ergonomic frameworks, focusing on attention, memory, and environmental design.

== Overview ==
Action slips occur when an individual intends to perform one action but inadvertently executes another, often due to the automatic nature of routine tasks. These errors are common in everyday life and do not necessarily indicate cognitive impairment. They are studied in cognitive psychology, ergonomics, and human-computer interaction, with applications in improving safety, interface design, and error prevention.

The term was popularized by psychologist Donald Norman in his 1988 book, The Design of Everyday Things, where he described action slips as errors in the execution of action sequences. A specific type of action slip, known as slips and capture, occurs when a more frequent action overrides a less familiar one, often in high-stress situations like police use-of-force incidents.

== Types ==
Action slips can be classified based on the cognitive processes involved, as outlined by Norman and Reason:

- Capture Errors: Occur when a familiar, habitual action is executed instead of the intended one, often because the context is similar. For example, a person might throw dirty clothes into a trash bin instead of a laundry basket if both are nearby and the actions are similar. A notable subset, known as slips and capture, is often cited in high-stress scenarios, such as police officers mistakenly using a firearm instead of a Taser.
- Loss of Activation Errors: Happen when the goal of an action is forgotten mid-task, leading to an incomplete or incorrect action. For instance, walking into a room and forgetting why one entered.
- Description Errors: Involve performing the correct action but on the wrong object due to similarity in appearance or context. An example is pouring coffee into a sugar jar instead of a coffee canister.
- Mode Errors: Occur when a device or system is in a different mode than the user expects, leading to unintended outcomes. For example, pressing a button on a keyboard expecting it to type a letter, but it triggers a shortcut because the system is in a different mode.

== Causes ==
Action slips are typically caused by:

- Automaticity: Routine tasks are performed with minimal conscious attention, making them prone to errors when distractions occur.
- Environmental Design: Poorly designed systems or objects that are too similar (e.g., identical containers for coffee and sugar) increase the likelihood of errors.
- Distraction or Fatigue: Reduced attention due to multitasking, stress, or tiredness can impair the monitoring of action sequences.
- Habit Interference: Strong habits can override intended actions, especially in familiar contexts.

== Examples ==
Common examples of action slips include:

- Using the wrong key to unlock a door (e.g., trying to open a house door with a car key).
- Typing an incorrect but familiar word due to muscle memory (e.g., typing "the" instead of "they").
- Placing an item in the wrong location, such as putting a milk carton in a cupboard instead of the refrigerator.
- Forgetting the purpose of entering a room or starting a task.

In high-stakes settings, action slips can have serious consequences, such as a pilot misreading an instrument due to a poorly designed cockpit interface or a nurse administering the wrong medication due to similar packaging.

== Differences from Freudian slip ==
While both action slips and Freudian slips involve unintended actions or errors, they differ significantly in their theoretical explanations:

- A Freudian slip is interpreted as a manifestation of repressed unconscious desires or thoughts, as described by Sigmund Freud in his 1901 work, The Psychopathology of Everyday Life. For example, saying "I hate you" instead of "I love you" might reveal unconscious hostility.
- An action slip is explained by cognitive processes, such as lapses in attention or environmental triggers, without invoking the unconscious. For instance, pouring coffee into a sugar jar is typically attributed to similar containers or distraction, not a hidden desire.

The distinction is critical, as action slips focus on practical, observable causes and solutions, while Freudian slips are rooted in psychoanalytic interpretation.

== Applications ==
The study of action slips has practical implications in several fields:

- Ergonomics and Design: Understanding action slips informs the design of user-friendly interfaces, tools, and environments. For example, labeling containers distinctly or color-coding controls can reduce errors.
- Safety Engineering: In industries like aviation, healthcare, and manufacturing, analyzing action slips helps prevent accidents caused by human error.
- Human-Computer Interaction: Designing intuitive software interfaces reduces mode errors and improves user experience.
- Cognitive Training: Techniques like mindfulness can help individuals increase attention during routine tasks, reducing slips.

== Prevention ==
To minimize action slips, strategies include:

- Environmental Redesign: Use distinct containers, clear labels, or physical barriers to differentiate objects (e.g., color-coded jars for coffee and sugar).
- Attention Management: Practice mindfulness or verbalize actions to disrupt automaticity (e.g., saying "I'm putting the clothes in the laundry basket").
- Habit Modification: Reorganize routines or environments to break error-prone patterns.
- Feedback Systems: Design systems that provide immediate feedback when an error occurs, such as alerts in software or tactile differences in tools.

== See also ==
- Freudian slip
- Cognitive psychology
- Human factors and ergonomics
- Human error
- Slips and capture
- The Design of Everyday Things
