= Killing of Eric Harris =

2015 manslaughter in Tulsa, Oklahoma

- Bodycam footage showing Eric Harris running from the police, prior to getting shot.
- Location: Tulsa, Oklahoma, United States
- Date: April 2, 2015; 11 years ago c. 11:00 a.m. (CDT; UTC-05:00)
- Victims: Eric Courtney Harris, aged 43
- Perpetrator: Robert Charles Bates
- Verdict: Guilty
- Convictions: Second-degree manslaughter
- Sentence: 4 years imprisonment (paroled after 1 1/2 years)

On April 2, 2015, 43-year-old African-American Eric Courtney Harris was fatally shot during an undercover sting in Tulsa, Oklahoma, as Harris ran from authorities unarmed. While Harris was being subdued, Tulsa County Reserve Deputy Robert Charles Bates, 73, claims he confused his personal weapon, a Smith & Wesson .357 revolver, for a Model X26 Taser. Bates shot Harris in the back when he was on the ground. According to the Tulsa County Sheriff's office, he immediately said afterwards, "Oh, I shot him! I'm sorry." Bates was found guilty of second-degree manslaughter (unintentional homicide resulting from criminal negligence) and sentenced to four years in prison, and was released after serving 18 months.

== Aftermath ==
It was later determined that Harris did not have a gun when he was tackled and shot. A sunglasses-camera video shows his arms flailing as he runs. Bates was later charged with second-degree manslaughter.

Harris family attorney Donald Smolen said the sunglasses video shows Deputy Bates with a yellow Taser strapped to his chest and a .357 revolver in his right hand as he stands over Harris. "There is absolutely no way, if Mr. Bates had been trained at all, which I believe will be reflected ultimately through the lack of records to substantiate his training, that an officer who was trained would [ever] get these two weapons confused," Smolen said.

In the video, Harris can be heard saying, "I'm losing my breath," to which 38-year-old Deputy Joseph Byars replies, "Fuck your breath." 24-year-old Deputy Michael Huckeby is also shown in the video kneeling on Harris' head as the dying Harris is told, "You shouldn't have ran," and "Shut the fuck up." A third deputy restraining Harris was not identified.

Tulsa Police Sgt. Jim Clark, hired as an "expert witness" for the sheriff's department, said at a news conference on April 10, 2015, that Bates "was a true victim of slips and capture", and that it was typical for law enforcement officers to experience diminished hearing, tunnel vision, or go into "autopilot", where a person's behavior "slips" off the path of his intention because it is "captured" by a stronger response and sent in a different direction. "Bates didn't commit a crime," Clark said, and no policy violations occurred.

Smolen told the Tulsa World that Clark's ruling was "premature and ill-advised", challenging a report that Harris was "uncooperative and combative" as firefighters attempted to administer aid, and Harris could hardly be combative since he was struggling with labored breathing and his hands were cuffed. "It's most likely the word 'combative' is being used because that's what they're being told by the Sheriff's Office," Smolen told the World. "The other alternative is their use of the word combative is more a description of Mr. Harris struggling to get air and kind of writhing in pain from the gunshot wound."

=== Bates' qualification scandal ===
The Tulsa Police Department immediately sought to clarify their relationships with both Bates and Clark. "Robert Bates has no current affiliation with the Tulsa Police Department and has not had any in 50 years," TPD said in a press release. "Additionally, Mr. Jim Clark, a consultant for the Tulsa County Sheriff, does not represent the Tulsa Police Department nor has the Tulsa Police Department conducted an assessment of this incident." Later that week, the Tulsa World reported that supervisors at the Tulsa County Sheriff's Office had been ordered to falsify Deputy Bates' training records.

Sheriff's spokesperson Shannon Clark later said the documents wouldn't matter because Bates, who donated $2,500 to and chaired Sheriff Stanley Glanz's re-election campaign, had been granted special exceptions.

In 2008, Bates had also donated substantial new equipment to the sheriff's department, including new Dodge Chargers and a Crown Victoria, as well as a computer for one car, and a $5,000 "forensic camera" and lenses. In 2010, Bates donated a used 2007 Ford F-150 and a new 2010 Chevy Tahoe, plus a Motorola hand-held radio "...to be used by the drug unit for surveillance work," according to department records. The next year he gave the department a used 1997 Toyota Avalon intended for "...use as an undercover car by the drug task force."

Glanz said during an interview with a radio station that the sheriff's deputy who certified Bates had moved on to work for the Secret Service, while the Maricopa County Sheriff's Office denied providing Bates with the training he claimed.

Glanz resigned, effective November 1, 2015, as a result of the scandal around Bates' lack of legitimate qualification. An election to replace him was held on March 1, 2016. In 2016, he pleaded guilty for failing to release information that proved the department knew Bates to be unqualified. Glanz was sentenced to one year in jail, but his sentence was suspended.

== Legal proceedings ==
On April 14, 2015, Bates was charged with second-degree manslaughter (unintentional homicide resulting from criminal negligence). He turned himself in at the Tulsa County Jail, where he was released on the same day, having posted $25,000 bail. The charge of second-degree manslaughter carried a maximum of four years in prison. Bates pleaded not guilty on April 21, 2015. On April 28, 2016, Bates was found guilty. Based on the jury's recommendation, he was sentenced to four years in prison. Bates was released from prison on October 19, 2017, after serving 37% of his sentence, including jail time.

In January 2018, Bates was photographed by a customer who was familiar with him, as he had been apparently drinking wine at a bar in contravention of the conditions of his parole from prison. His bar receipt was also photographed.

In March 2018, Tulsa County agreed to pay the family of Eric Harris $6 million as a final settlement of a federal lawsuit.
