= William Lewinski =

Canadian-born retired professor

William J. Lewinski (1944 or 1945 (age 79–80)) is a Canadian-born retired psychology professor and expert on police use of force at his own Force Science Institute, founded in 2004. He provides training to police and serves as an expert witness in court cases.

== Early career ==
Born in Canada, Lewinski started his career as a school teacher in Winnipeg, Ontario. He received his doctorate from the distance-learning Union for Experimenting Colleges and Universities of Cincinnati, Ohio in 1988, in a self-designed major of police psychology. The school isn't accredited in psychology, his police psychology major isn't recognized by the American Psychological Association, and Lewinski has never been licensed to practice as a psychologist. He was a tenured professor at Minnesota State University in Mankato, Minnesota, and founded the Center for the Study of Performance in Extreme Encounters in 2004. It was later renamed Force Science Research Center, moved off-campus, and removed its affiliation with the school. He retired from the university after 28 years.

== Police use of force philosophies ==
Lewinski's career is as a researcher and expert witness in police use of force cases.

In two court cases, Lisa Fournier, editor of the American Journal of Psychology, has testified that Lewinski's work lacked basic elements of legitimate research, drew conclusions unsupported by data, and was pseudoscience. In response Lewinski stated she was "naïve or her ethics are seriously compromised".

He was described as an "opportunist" by Michael Haddad, president of the National Police Accountability Project. Haddad also called him "charming" but "his opinions can be pretty flaky". Paul Wright of Prison Legal News said Lewinski is "firmly in the category of junk science".

=== Shoot first and reaction time ===
Lewinski published three studies between 1999 and 2002 showing that test subjects could raise and fire a previously hidden gun faster than a police officer could react, termed "action/reaction". The studies were published in The Police Marksman, which is a magazine, not a peer-reviewed journal.

In summary, this study is invalid and unreliable. In my opinion, this study questions the ability of Mr. Lewinski to apply relevant and reliable data to answer a question or support an argument.

— Lisa Fournier, editor of The American Journal of Psychology, 2012

Lewinski's has defended police on the basis of his policies, even in cases where someone was unarmed, facing away from the police, or the officer's testimony did not match video evidence. Chuck Wexler, director of Police Executive Research Forum, has objected to Lewinski's "shoot first" view. Christy Lopez, Obama Justice Department attorney and Georgetown University law professor, said "the Bill Lewinski show" was part of an insidious trend in police training that used pseudoscience to justify excessive force.

Dan Handelman of Portland Copwatch dubs the "shoot first" philosophy as the "Superman theory", describing how "many suspects are shot in the back because they turn before the officer's bullet hits them".

=== Inattentional blindness ===
Lewinski's testimony often cites inattentional blindness for any flaws or omissions in an officer's testimony. Arien Mack, one of the psychologists who coined the term, called his use of the term "completely inappropriate", stating "I hate the fact that it’s being used in this way. When we work in a lab, we ask them if they saw something. They have no motivation to lie. A police officer involved in a shooting certainly has a reason to lie."

=== Excited delirium ===
Lewinski has also promoted the term "excited delirium", captured in a discussion while officer Derek Chauvin was choking George Floyd. The Los Angeles Times noted that Force Science had over 20 articles using the term on its website. The Marshall Project has noted the term is controversial despite being used frequently in use-of-force cases. Axon Enterprise has also lobbied use of the term to explain deaths, rather than from excessive use of their Taser.

=== Cooling-off periods ===
Lewinski is also a strong advocate for "cooling-off periods" before police officers document an officer-involved shooting, a position that is not afforded to other testimonies in a shooting and is contrary to studies. In an opinion for the Washington Post, author Radley Balko discussed the cooling-off period and called Lewinski "an unapologetic partisan who pushes pseudoscience in order to clear cops of wrongdoing", noting Lewinski advocates that officers shoot without hesitation yet should be provided time for their shooting statements.

== Cases ==
Lewinski's testimony has been used in the following cases:

- Tycel Nelson, 1990, Minneapolis
- Anthony Lee, 2000, Los Angeles Police Department
- Willie Wilkins, 2001, undercover police officer shot to death by Oakland Police Department. City settled for $3.5 million.
- Timothy Thomas, 2001, Cincinnati
- Shooting by Officer Robert Murtha, 2003, Hartford Connecticut
- Darryl Hamilton, 2003, Chicago Police Department (Lewinski also provided testimony for at least six other Chicago cases by 2015)
- Duy Ngo, 2003, Minneapolis Police Department officer shot and killed by a follow officer. City paid Ngo's family $4.5 million.
- Deborah King, 2003, use of force by Minnesota's Ramsey County Sheriff's Office. Lewinski made a medical diagnosis of King from the stand, though he has no medical endorsements. City paid King $450,000.
- James Jahar Perez, 2004, Portland Police Bureau
- Devin Brown, 2005, Los Angeles Police Department
- Elio Carrion, 2007, wounded in shooting by San Bernardino County sheriff’s deputy Ivory Webb. Settled civil suit with the County for $1.5 million; Webb was acquitted of felony charges.
- Philip Miller, 2007, Los Angeles. Lewinski's testimony was disputed by expert witness Roger Clark and Lewinski's qualifications were disputed. Lewinski's testimony was thrown out. The City still won the case, however.
- Paul Boyd (animator), 2007, Vancouver Police Department, British Columbia. After Lewinski's bias in the case was questioned, BC's oversight board (Office of the Police Complaint Commissioner) stated they would not hire him again.
- Oscar Grant III, 2009, Bay Area Rapid Transit police, Oakland. Shot while face-down, hands behind his back, with another officer's knees on his neck. Lewinski bolstered the theory that the officer accidentally used his gun rather than his Taser.
- James Boyd, 2014, Albuquerque Police Department
- Andy Lopez, 13-year-old carrying a toy gun, 2014, Sonoma Countysheriff
- Stephon Clark, 2018, Sacramento

== Departments trained by Lewinski or Force Science Institute ==
- Minneapolis Police Department cadet training, 1990-1993
- US Justice Department
- Los Angeles Police Department, further training cancelled
- 90 officers from 13 states for a national seminar at Madison Area Technical College, 2014
- Chicago Independent Police Review Authority, 2015
- Rochester Police Department, 2017, city funds for attendance of officers withdrawn after objections, was still hosted by RPD's union, the Locust Club
- National seminar for International Union of Police Associations, 2018
- National seminar held at St. Paul Police Department, Minnesota, 2019
- Ohio State University police department, 2020, cancelled after objections. The training included a description explaining how "investigators can ‘mine’ officers’ memories and avoid interviewing mistakes that can put the officer, the investigator, and the entire department in jeopardy."

== See also ==
- Slips and capture
