= Mardi Gras Park =

Park in Alabama, United States

Coordinates: 30.6895661°N 88.0426754°W

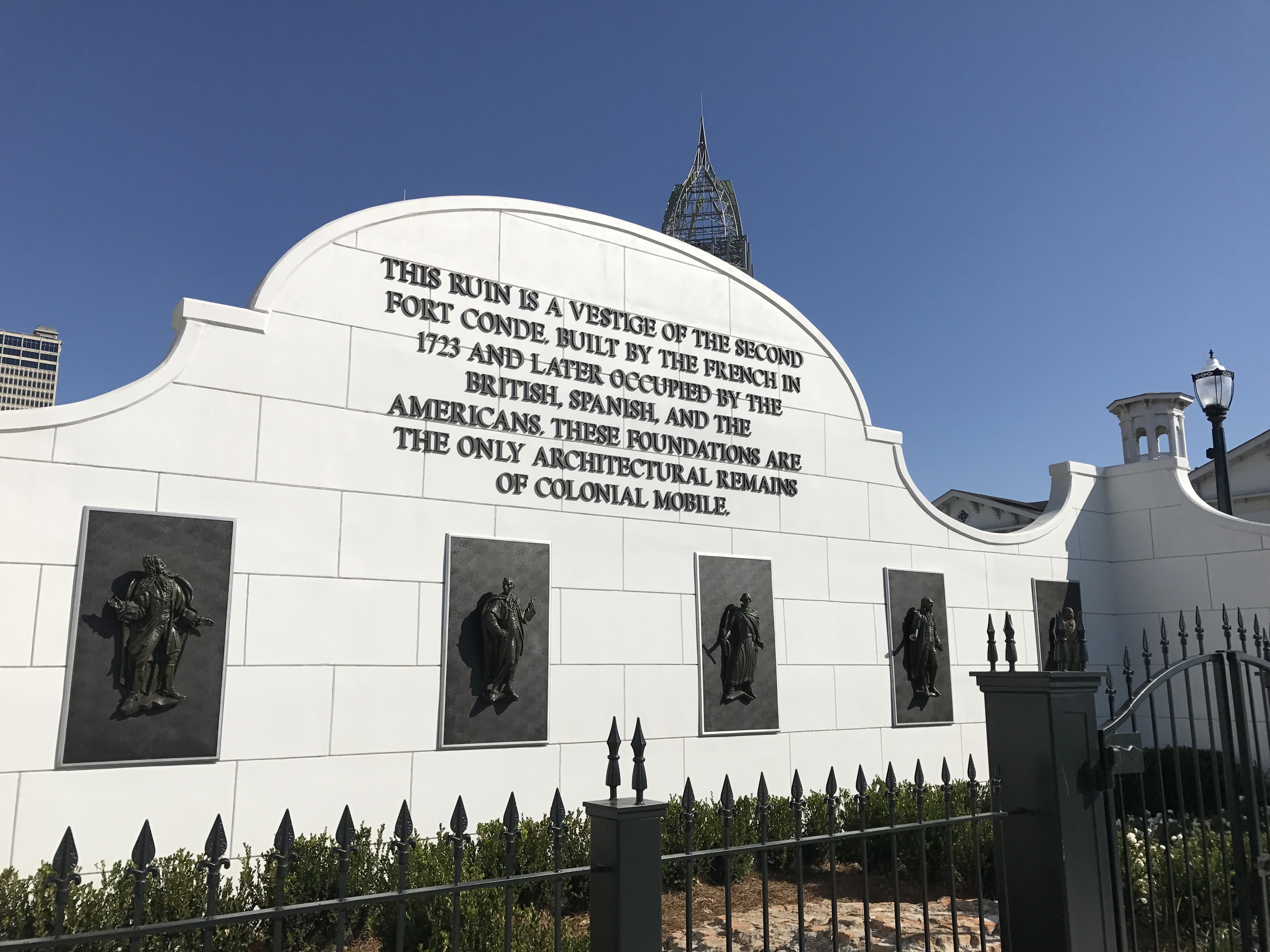
- Mardi Gras Park sign from Church Street.
- Interactive map of Mardi Gras Park
- Type: Public park
- Location: Mobile, Alabama, US
- Created: 2016; 10 years ago
- Operator: The City of Mobile
- Status: Open all year

Mardi Gras Park is a municipal park in downtown Mobile, Alabama, US. The park is bounded by Government Street to the north, Royal Street to the east, Church Street to the south, and St. Emanuel Street to the west. The park opened in November 2016. It is located on the site of the old Mobile County Courthouse. The park features statues representing the Mardi Gras tradition of the City, including Mardi Gras royalty, jesters, and Joe Cain (as his alter ego, Chief Slacabamorinico), who is largely credited with initiating the modern way of observing Mardi Gras and its celebrations in the city following the Civil War.

== Construction ==
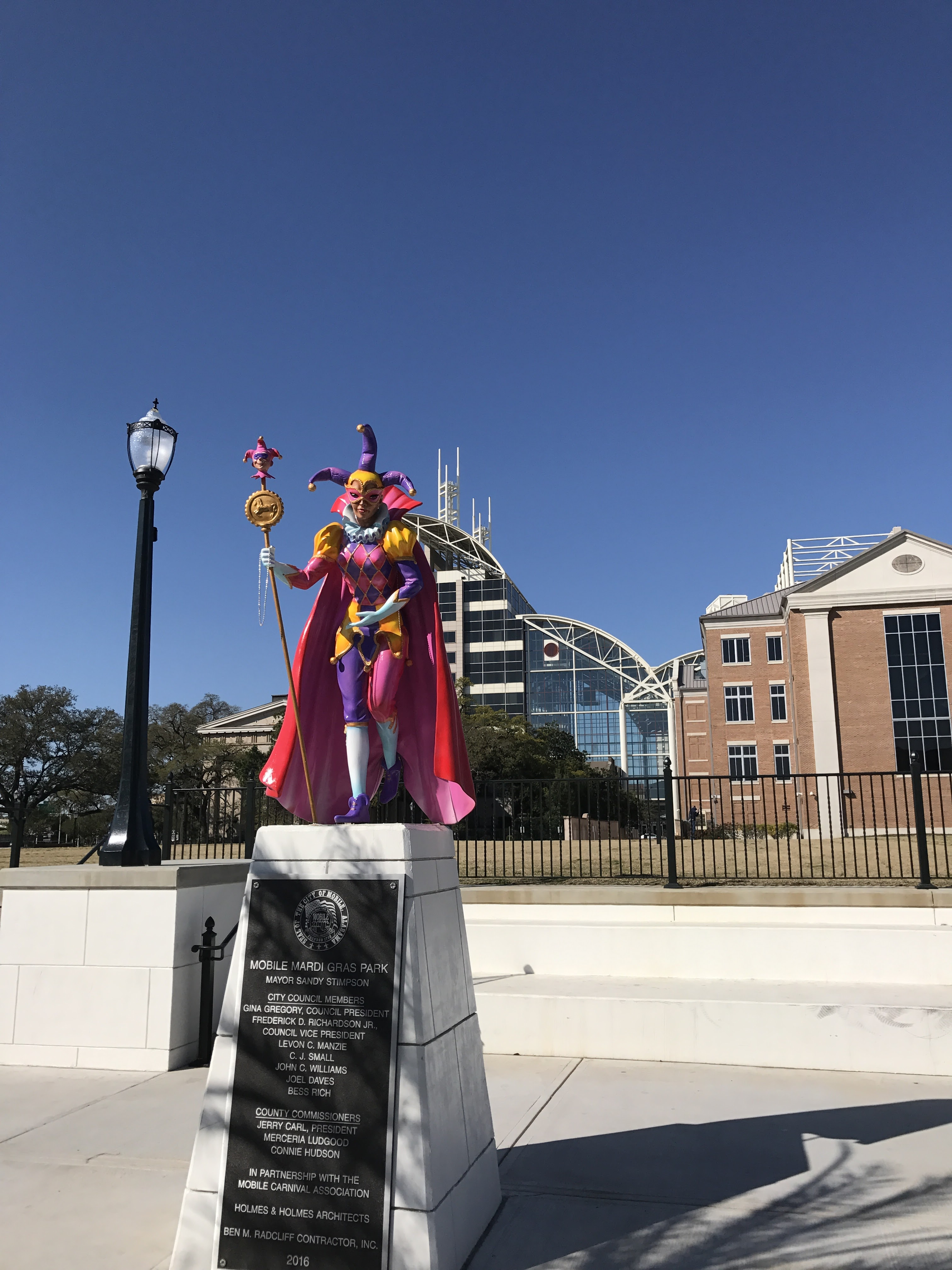
Jester statue in Mardi Gras Park.

On November 24, 2014, the city council approved $2.5 million in spending covering the design and construction of the first phase of the two-phase Mardi Gras Park project, with $980,000 of the balance being privately financed. The groundbreaking ceremony was held on November 25, 2015. The park opened upon the completion of the first phase on November 29, 2016. Construction of the second phase, which is to include a pavilion and open air market, has not yet commenced as the City continues to search for funding.
