= Slips and capture =

Human error in high-stress situations also known as a Brainfart

A slips and capture error is a type of human error in the psychology of routine task performance, where a person inadvertently performs one action while intending to do another, often under high-stress conditions. It is a specific subset of action slips, which encompass a broader range of errors in automatic behaviors caused by lapses in attention, habitual actions, or environmental design.

The term "slips and capture" became more widely known in the early 21st century in the United States, after being referred to by law enforcement in two prominent fatal police shooting cases in 2009 and 2015. In both cases, the police officer claimed to have shot a suspect while intending to use a Taser.

== Background and history ==
The concept of "slips and capture" has been studied in the psychology of human error, and efforts to prevent error. It was thoroughly described in 1990 by James Reason.

The concept has been addressed in efforts to improve business, including computer and program design, and medical practices in order to avoid preventable error. Both terms are used in error terminology: slips are defined as "errors in the performance of skill-based behaviors, typically when our attention is diverted;" and capture refers to "a type of slip where a more frequent and more practiced behavior takes place when a similar, but less familiar, action was intended."

=== Relation to Action Slips ===
Slips and capture errors are a subset of action slips, a broader category of errors in cognitive psychology where routine, skill-based actions deviate from the intended goal due to lapses in attention, habit interference, or environmental design. While slips and capture errors often occur in high-stress situations, such as police use-of-force incidents, action slips also include everyday errors, like pouring coffee into a sugar jar instead of a coffee canister. The concept of action slips, developed by Donald Norman, provides a framework for understanding slips and capture within the larger study of human error.

== Shooting of Oscar Grant ==
Early on New Year's Day of 2009, Oscar Grant III was fatally shot by Bay Area Rapid Transit officer Johannes Mehserle, who was detaining Grant with other officers after a reported fight on the train. At his bail hearing in late January 2009, Mehserle said that he had intended to use his Taser, but inadvertently grabbed his pistol instead. In 2010 a jury convicted Mehserle of involuntary manslaughter, acquitting him of charges of voluntary manslaughter.

The phrase "slips and capture" was used by Bill Lewinski in 2009, a consultant in police use of force who was part of Mehserle's defense team. Lewinski was reported by the Wisconsin State Journal to have a doctorate in psychology from Union Institute & University, an online college. His company, Force Science Institute, specializes in consulting to police departments. Its website advertises: "We save lives and reputations." Lewinski published a newsletter article on the "Slips and Capture" theory in his "Force Science News #154" after he began work on the defense of Mehserle.

== Shooting of Eric Courtney Harris ==
On April 2, 2015, 44-year-old Eric Courtney Harris was shot to death by Tulsa city police during an undercover sting in Tulsa, Oklahoma. As Harris was being subdued, Tulsa County Reserve Deputy Robert Charles "Bob" Bates, 73, fatally shot Harris in the back, according to the Tulsa County Sheriff's Office. Bates used the concept of "slips and capture" in his defense, saying that he had intended to use his Taser on Harris.

== See also ==
- Action slip
- Shooting of Adam Salter, a 2009 shooting that a coroner suggested may have been intended as a Taser firing
- Shooting of Daunte Wright, a 2021 shooting in which the shooting officer claimed slips and capture as a reason for firing her gun instead of her Taser.
