= George Floyd memorial (disambiguation) =

Memorials to George Floyd commemorate the African American man who was murdered by a Minneapolis police officer on May 25, 2020.

George Floyd memorial or George Floyd Memorial may refer to:

== Artwork ==
- Bust of George Floyd, a sculpture in Brooklyn, New York
- George Floyd and Anti-Racist Street Art database, a free, digital library
- George Floyd mural (Portland, Oregon), a former public art exhibit
- Statue of George Floyd, a bronze sculpture in Newark, New Jersey

== Events ==
- George Floyd Square occupied protest, a former semi-autonomous zone in Minneapolis, Minnesota
- Lists of George Floyd protests

== Proposed U.S. laws ==
- BREATHE Act
- George Floyd Justice in Policing Act
  - George Floyd Law Enforcement Trust and Integrity Act, a bill subtitle

== Organizations ==
- George Floyd Global Memorial, a non-profit organization in Minneapolis, Minnesota
- George Floyd Memorial Foundation, a non-profit organization founded by Bridgett Floyd in Mooresville, North Carolina
- Official George Floyd Memorial Fund, a GoFundMe campaign

== Street intersection ==
- George Floyd Square, the intersection in Minneapolis, Minnesota

== See also ==
- George Floyd (disambiguation)
- List of Black Lives Matter street murals
- List of monuments and memorials removed during the George Floyd protests
- List of name changes due to the George Floyd protests
- Memorials to George Floyd
