= Black Lives Matter art in Portland, Oregon =

Public art in Portland, Oregon related to the Black Lives Matter movement

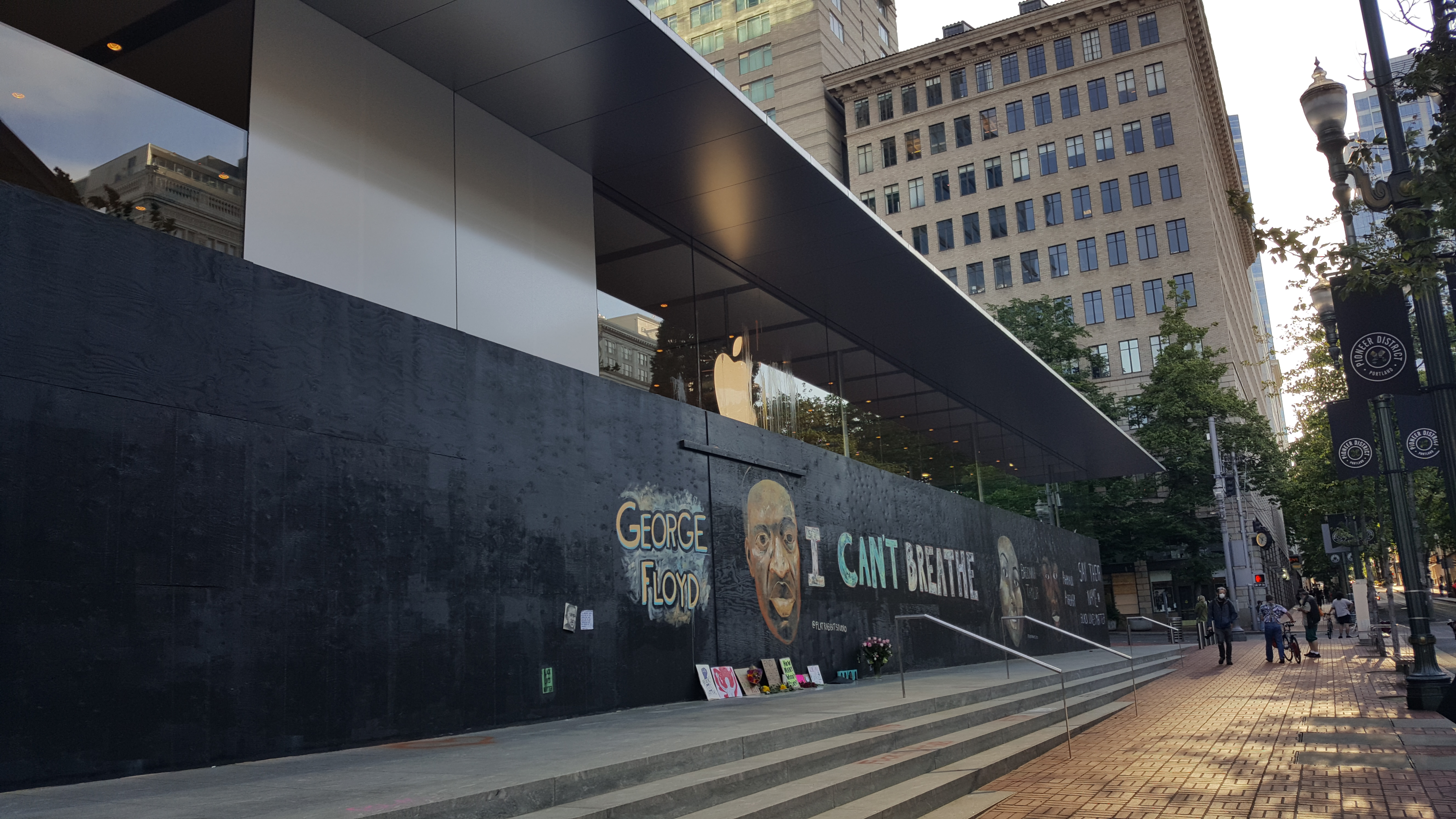
The George Floyd mural in Portland, Oregon, June 2020

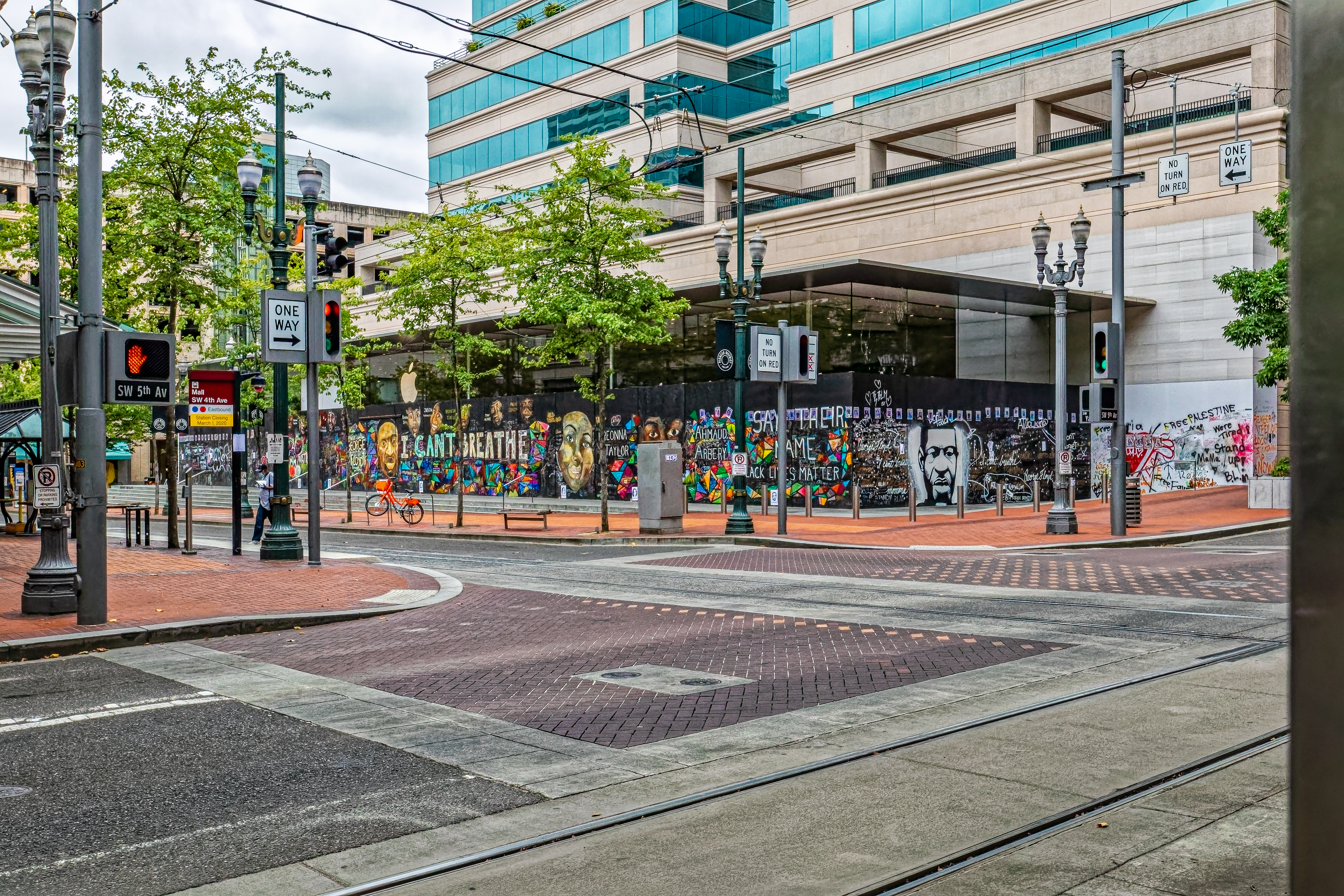
Murals on boarded windows of Apple Pioneer Place

Many artworks related to the Black Lives Matter movement were created in Portland, Oregon, United States, during local protests over the murder of George Floyd and other Black Americans. Oregon Arts Watch contextualized the artistic works, stating that a "whitewashed pre-COVID lens" on American life, which obscured systemic racism, had been "cracked", and describing artists' response to racial violence being brought into the public eye was a "marathon, not a sprint".

== Background ==
In mid 2020, during local protests over the murder of George Floyd, many boarded windows, sidewalks, and other structures in downtown Portland were graffitied with chalk and paint, or covered by posters. According to Benjamin Brink of Street Roots, "Messaging range[d] from anti-police and anti-racist rhetoric to motivational quotes and support for Black lives". Many of the artworks depicted Floyd and other victims of police brutality in the U.S., or incorporated phrases associated with the Black Lives Matter movement such as "I can't breathe and "No justice, no peace". Some of the murals were added by local businesses.

== Artworks ==
=== Sculpture and performance art ===
The Thompson Elk Fountain, one of the most visible public artworks in Portland, located near frequent protests at the Multnomah County Justice Center, was removed for its protection. The elk has been used since as an antifascist symbol, perhaps most visibly in a sculpture dubbed "Nightmare Elk" erected in the Thompson Elk's place.

The Trump Statue Initiative performed several "statues" at Tom McCall Waterfront Park in summer 2020.

=== Murals ===
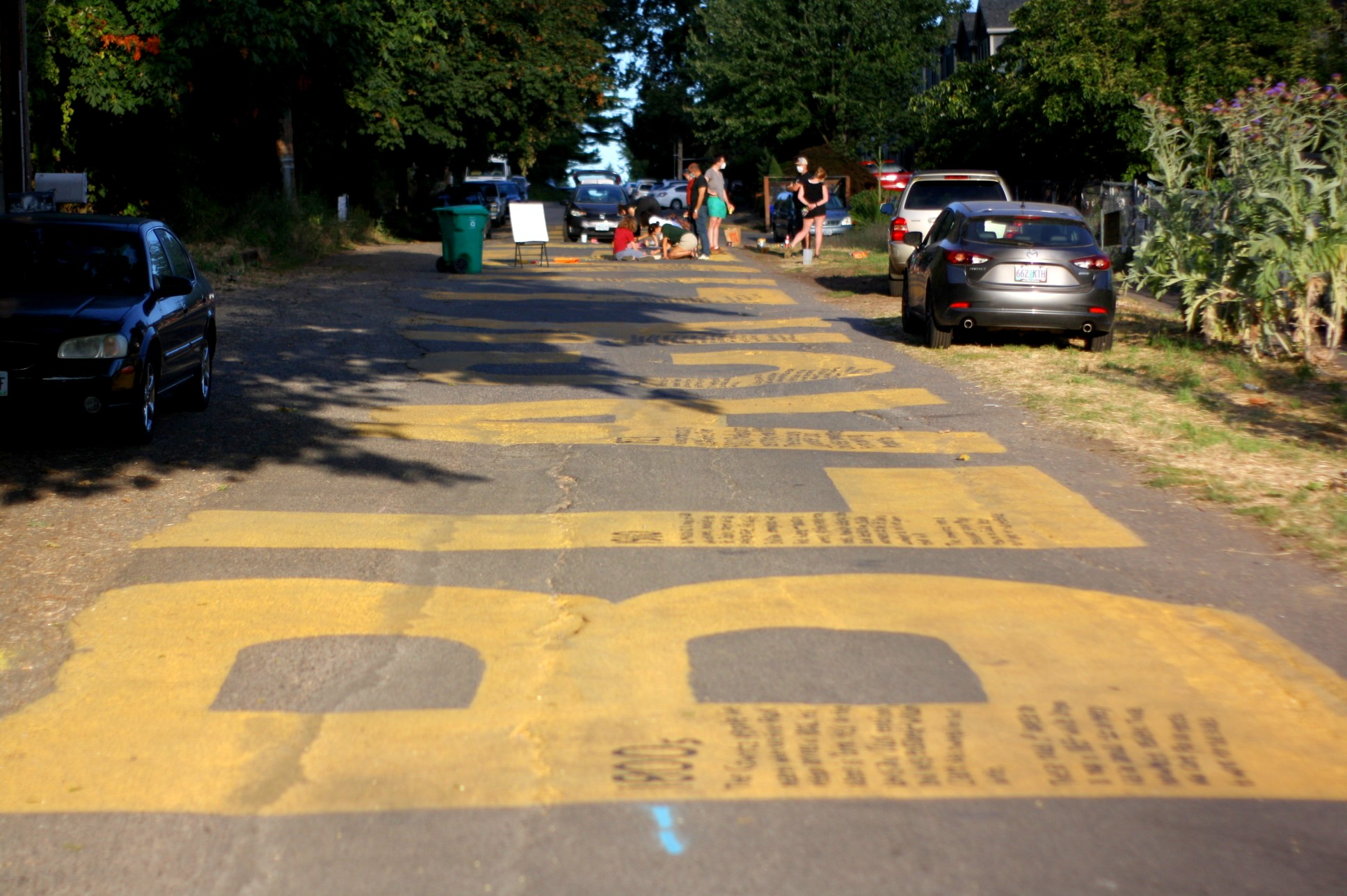
Black Lives Matter street mural

The Black Lives Matter street mural was painted in north Portland's St. Johns neighborhood in June 2020, and vandalized one month later. We Stand with You by Christian Grijalva was installed in northeast Portland's King neighborhood in June 2020. The mural depicts Ahmaud Arbery, Floyd and Breonna Taylor, and was vandalized in 2021.

==== Downtown ====
Mural of Claudette Colvin in downtown Portland

Emma Berger painted portraits on boards protecting windows of Apple Pioneer Place (Southwest Yamhill Street and Fifth Avenue). She started with one of Floyd on June 1, 2020, and worked to recruit other artists and protesters to participate. A portrait of Arbery was added outside the store. In the Pioneer Place vicinity, portraits depicted Kendra James, Deontae J. Keller, and Jason Washington, all of whom were shot to death by Portland Police Bureau officers, as well as Tony McDade and Anton Sterling, who were killed by officers in Tallahassee and Baton Rouge, respectively. Portraits of Rayshard Brooks, Elijah McClain, and Taylor also appeared.

Mexican artist and mother Xochilt Ruvalcaba was commissioned by Lisa Schroeder, the owner of Mother's Bistro to paint a series of murals dedicated to Floyd and seven Black children who were killed by police, including Trayvon Martin and Tamir Rice. Next to the portraits Ruvalcaba described the circumstances of their deaths. Ruvalcaba's mural of the words “All Mothers were summoned when he called out to his mama” became the slogan of Moms United for Black Lives, who wore bright yellow T-shirts with the words "Summoned Mama - Black Lives Matter" to protests. Ruvalcaba's mural also inspired the global George Floyd and Antiracist Street Art Database.

==== Buckman neighborhood ====
After someone tagged the Imago Dei nondenominational church in the Buckman neighborhood with the phrase "Black Lives Matter" on June 3, staff member and artist Heidie Ambrose converted the graffiti into a larger "vibrantly colored" mural. The names of Black people who "died at the hands of systemic racism... police brutality, racial injustice or white supremacy" were painted on individual bricks, including locals as well as Arbery, Martin Luther King Jr., Taylor, and Emmett Till. By August, the mural had become a memorial. The church's associate pastor Michelle Jones said:

The mural is part of this often difficult, ongoing project. And as the conflict over the last month in Portland between federal agents and protesters has intensified, the artwork feels even more necessary... At Imago, we're trying to keep the main thing the main thing. I think that's also why the mural is there ― to remind those who see it that with so many things happening at the same time, justice matters. These people on this wall ― and people like them ― matter.

== Museum grant program ==
In August, local businessman and philanthropist Jordan Schnitzer announced a $150,000 Black Lives Matter grant program to award 60 artists in Oregon and Washington $2,500 each. The program is accepting proposals "for new work or projects, or recently created work directly responding to the current Black Lives Matter movement, responding to marginalized communities; experiences with systemic racism and inequality" until September 30, and grant recipients will be announced on October 31. Museums at Portland State University, University of Oregon, and Washington State University will each award 20 grants and display the newly created artworks upon reopening. In a press release, Schnitzer said, "I have often said artists are chroniclers of our time. We all feel anguish about the death of George Floyd and many others at the hands of racial oppression. We, more than ever, need artists to help us understand this issue and help us heal."

== See also ==
- Culture of Portland, Oregon
