= George Floyd Square (disambiguation) =

George Floyd Square may refer to:

- George Floyd Square, the memorialized section of street in Minneapolis
- George Floyd Square occupied protest, the former semi-autonomous zone

== See also ==
- George Floyd (disambiguation)
- George Floyd memorial (disambiguation)
