= Mama Mia Trattoria =

Italian restaurant in Portland, Oregon, U.S.

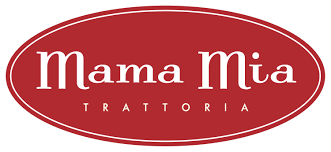

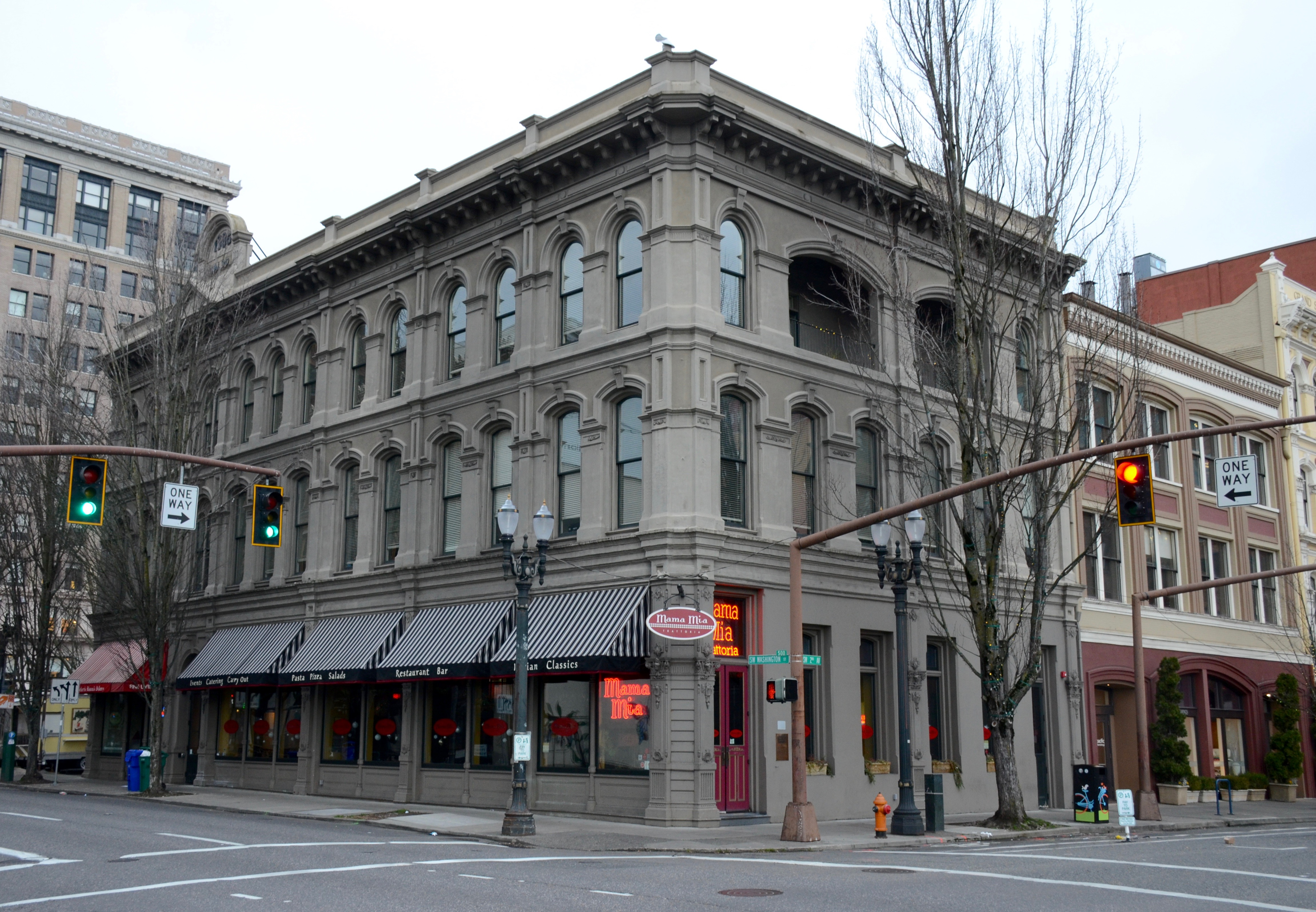
- The restaurant occupies the ground floor of the Waldo Block (pictured in 2018)
- Interactive map of Mama Mia Trattoria

Restaurant information
- Owners: Barry Brown, Brown Family Restaurants (2011–present)
- Previous owner: Lisa Schroeder (2004–2011)
- Food type: Italian cuisine
- Location: 439 Southwest 2nd Avenue, Portland, Multnomah, Oregon, 97204, United States
- Coordinates: 45.5194°N 122.6739°W
- Website: mamamiatrattoria.com

Mama Mia Trattoria is an Italian restaurant housed in Portland, Oregon's Waldo Block, in the United States.

== History ==
Lisa Schroeder opened the restaurant in 2004, and served as chef and owner (along with Mother's Bistro), until she sold the business to Barry Brown of Brown Family Restaurants in mid 2011.

The restaurant began serving weekend brunch in 2013.

== Reception ==
Mama Mia Trattoria was named Portland's best Italian restaurant by The Oregonian's readers in 2016. The restaurant was also praised for its happy hour options.

== See also ==
- List of Italian restaurants
