= George Lloyd =

George Lloyd may refer to:

- George Lloyd, 1st Baron Lloyd (1879–1941), British politician and colonial administrator
- George Lloyd (politician) (1815–1897), member of the New South Wales Legislative Assembly
- George Lloyd (bishop of Chester) (1560–1615), Bishop of Sodor and Man and Bishop of Chester, 1605–1614
- George Exton Lloyd (1861–1940), Bishop of Saskatchewan, 1922–1931
- George Lloyd (actor) (1892–1967), American actor
- George Lloyd (composer) (1913–1998), British composer
- George Butler Lloyd (1854–1930), British Member of Parliament for Shrewsbury, 1913–1922
- George Lloyd (RAF officer) (1892–1955), World War I flying ace
- George Lloyd (1900s footballer) (fl. 1901–1908), English association football player
- George Lloyd (scholar) (1708–1783), English Fellow of the Royal Society
- Peter Lloyd (aviator) (George Alfred Lloyd, 1920–2022), Australian sports aviator
- George Lloyd (archaeologist) (1820–1885), English Anglican curate and archaeologist
- George Lloyd (footballer, born 2000), English association football player
- George Loyd (1843–1892), U.S. Army soldier and Medal of Honor recipient
- George A. Loyd (1844–1917), Union Army private and Medal of Honor recipient

== See also ==
- George Floyd (disambiguation), a similar name of identical etymology
- Lloyd George (disambiguation)
