= George Floyd mural (Palm Springs, California) =

2020 mural

- Subject: George Floyd
- Location: Palm Springs, California, U.S.; 33.8273°N 116.5456°W

A mural depicting George Floyd was painted in Palm Springs, California, in 2020.

In 2021, the Palm Springs Public Arts Commission was seeking to relocate the mural. In 2024, the commission voted to allocate funds to restore the vandalized mural in its original location.

== See also ==
- 2020 in art
- Black Lives Matter art
  - List of Black Lives Matter street murals
- George Floyd mural (Portland, Oregon)
- Memorials to George Floyd
