= 8 minutes 46 seconds =

Symbol for police brutality, George Floyd's murder

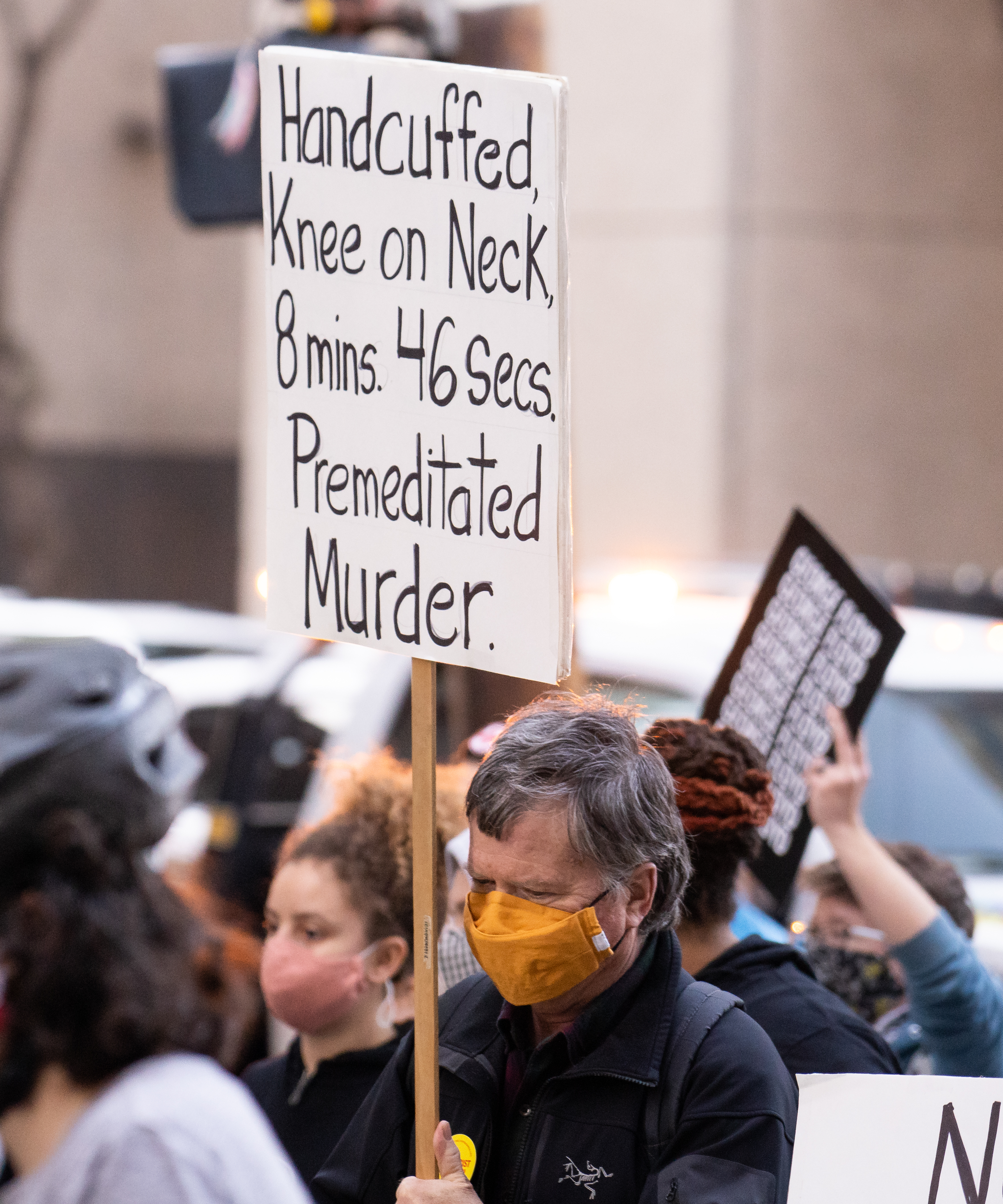
A protestor in Downtown Minneapolis holds a sign referencing the duration that Floyd was asphyxiated.

8 minutes 46 seconds (8:46) is a symbol of police brutality that originated from the murder of George Floyd on May 25, 2020, in Minneapolis, Minnesota, United States. Derek Chauvin, a former Minneapolis police officer, knelt on Floyd's neck, asphyxiating him. The duration that Chauvin spent kneeling was reported for weeks as 8 minutes 46 seconds, and later as 7 minutes 46 seconds, until body camera footage released in August 2020 showed that the actual time was 9 minutes 29 seconds. In the days following his murder, and the protests that followed, the duration became a focus of commemorations and debates, especially around Blackout Tuesday.

The duration has been specifically referenced in "die-in" protests in Minneapolis, New York, Boston, Detroit, Philadelphia, Pittsburgh, Portland, Chicago, Denver, and other cities, where protesters lay down for eight minutes and 46 seconds to protest police brutality and the racialized killings by law enforcement officers in the United States. It has also been used in numerous commemorations, vigils and gatherings to recognize Floyd and protest his murder, including at his memorial.

== Calculation ==
The duration is how long Chauvin placed his knee on Floyd's neck, starting after Floyd was taken from his car and restrained by the Minneapolis Police Department; Floyd was lying unmoving on his stomach. The duration of 8:46 originated from the County Attorney of Hennepin County initial complaint against Chauvin. The time was based on a bystander's video of the incident, which began with Chauvin's knee already on Floyd's neck.

Weeks later, the prosecution reassessed the time to be 7 minutes and 46 seconds. Despite further questions about the exact time, the county attorney's office said prosecutors did not intend to revisit the timing matter, stating that it did not affect the case and more important matters existed. In August, police body camera footage was publicly released which showed that Chauvin had his knee on Floyd's neck for about 9:30.

In March 2021, the prosecution and defense teams both cited a more accurate duration of 9 minutes 29 seconds during Chauvin's trial (4:45 as Floyd cried out for help, 0:53 as Floyd flailed due to seizures, and 3:51 as Floyd was non-responsive).

== Protests and commemorations ==
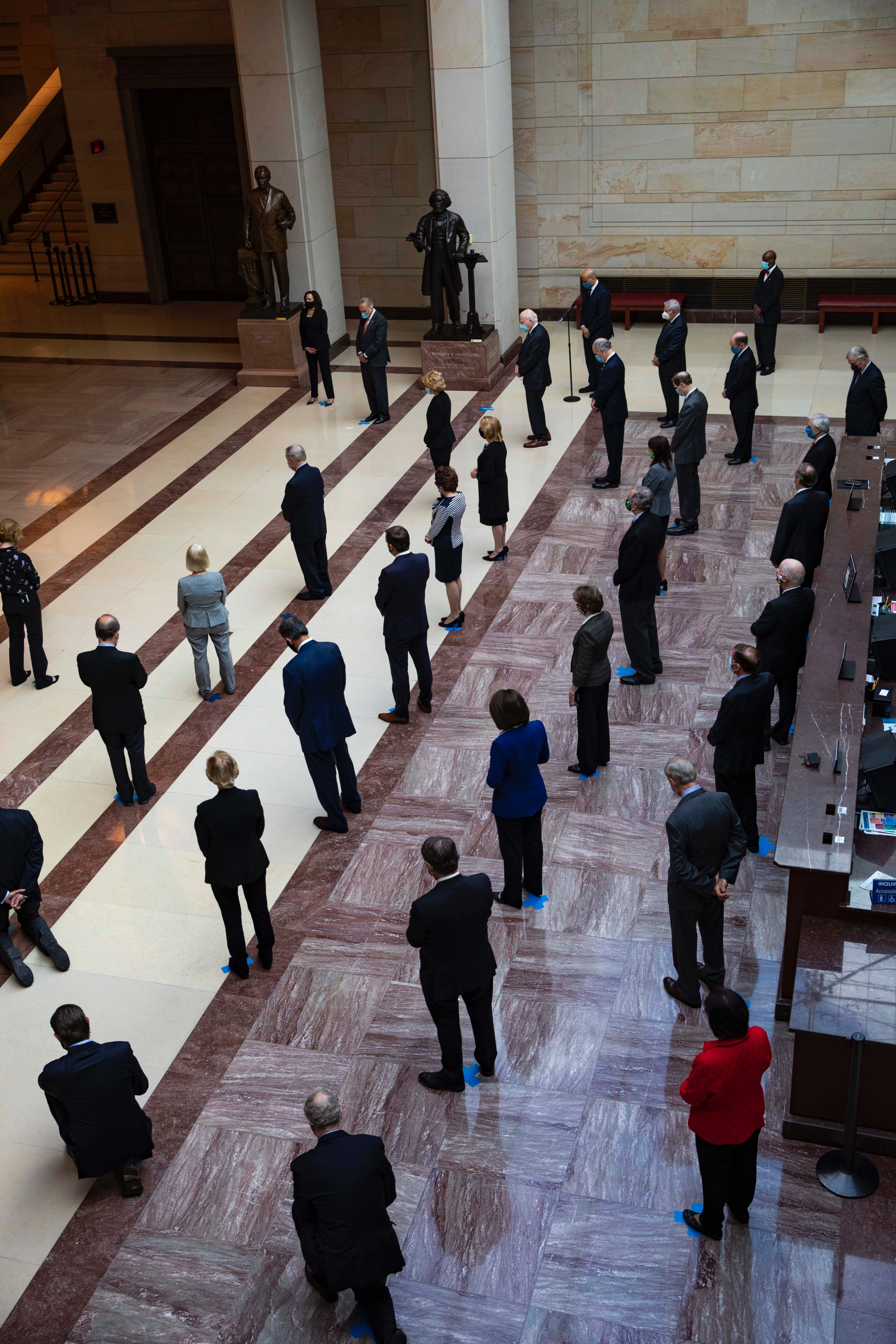
United States senators observe 8 minutes 46 seconds of silence, June 4, 2020.

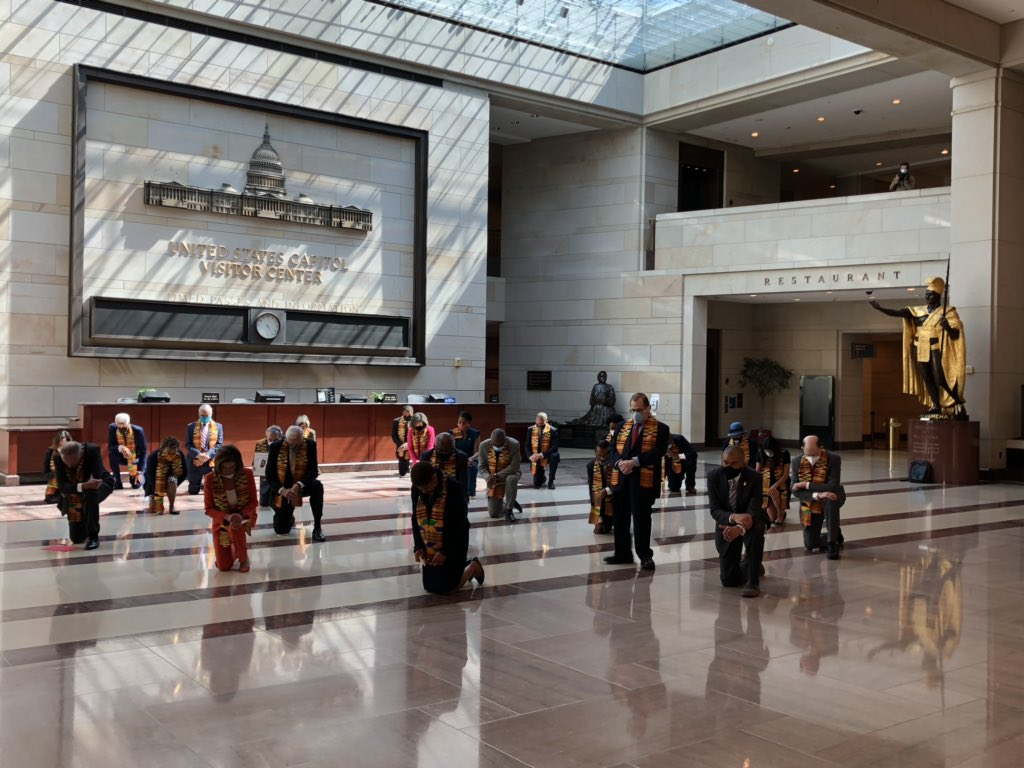
Congressional Democrats kneel for 8 minutes and 46 seconds, wearing kente cloth, June 8, 2020.

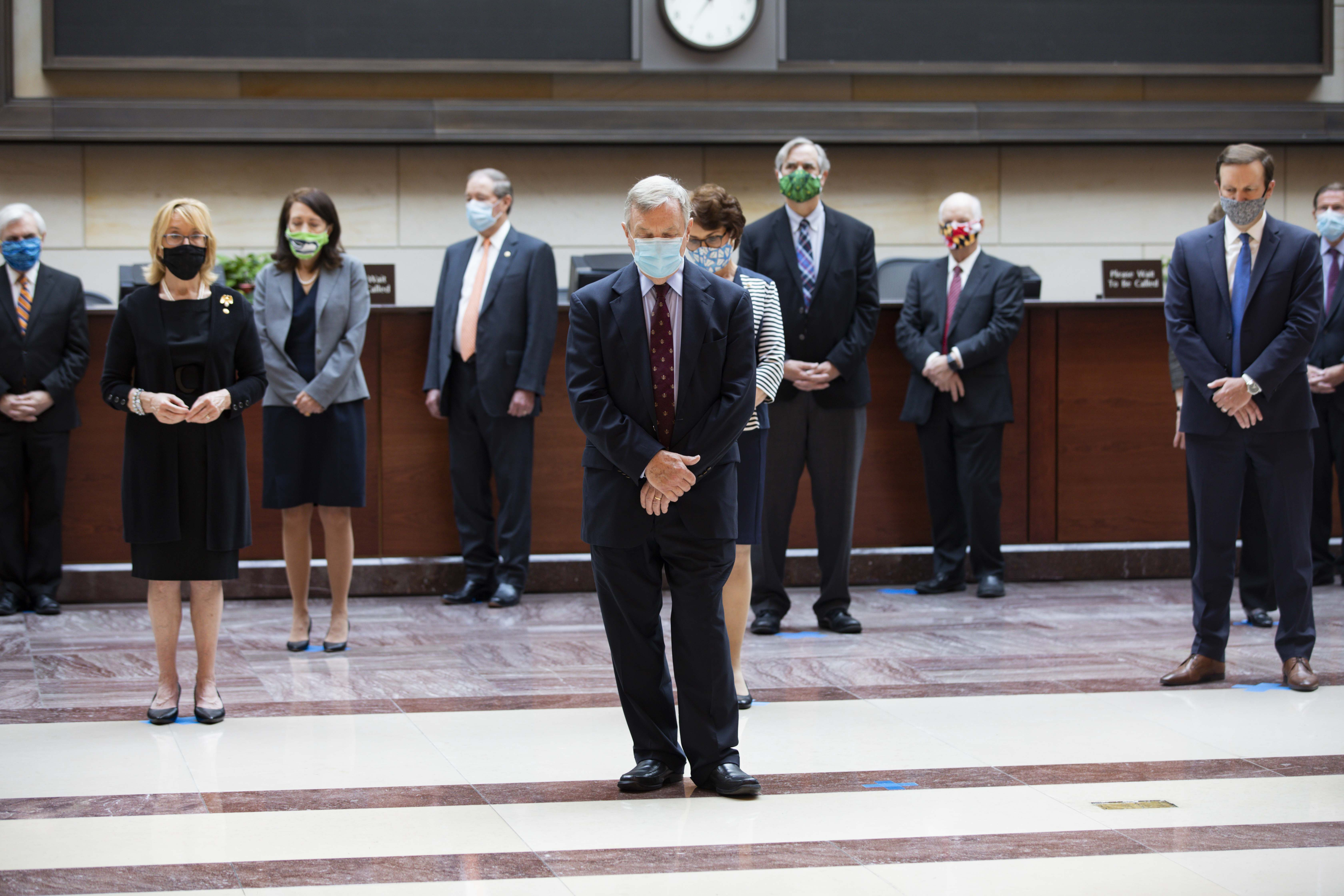
Senate Democrats hold a silence moment, June 4, 2020

In addition to the die-ins that have used 8 minutes 46 seconds as their staged length, numerous marches and gatherings have used the duration to mark moments of silence, vigils, prayers, traffic slowdowns or taking a knee. George Floyd's memorial in Minneapolis on June 4, 2020, ended with mourners standing for 8:46 to commemorate Floyd. In March 2021, Floyd's family, attorneys and supporters knelt for 8:46 outside the courthouse prior to the opening arguments in Chauvin's trial.

=== Cities and institutions ===
In St. Petersburg, Florida, city officials announced that from June 2 to June 9, citizens should "join together in a silent and peaceful protest by standing outside on their front porch or yard for 8 minutes and 46 seconds" each night at 8:00 pm.

Following the example of New York City's Empire State Building, the Kennedy Center in Washington, D.C. has stated that it would go dark for nine nights to acknowledge the nearly nine minutes Floyd was held with a neck restraint.

On June 9, 2020, Minnesota Governor Tim Walz issued a proclamation declaring 8 minutes 46 seconds of silence at 11:00 a.m. CDT in memory of George Floyd, which coincided with the beginning of Floyd's funeral in Houston, Texas, that day.

On May 25, 2021, Minnesota Governor Tim Walz declared a statewide moment of silence for 9 minutes and 29 seconds, the actual length of time Chauvin knelt on Floyd, for 1:00 p.m. CDT to recognize the one-year mark since Floyd's murder.

=== Politics ===
Democratic senators observed 8 minutes 46 seconds of silence, with some kneeling, during their caucus meeting on June 4, 2020.

=== Corporations ===
The Google technology company held an eight-minute-and-46-second moment of silence for its employees on June 3, 2020, to honor black lives lost in relation to the murder of George Floyd.

The New York Stock Exchange and Nasdaq observed a moment of silence lasting 8 minutes and 46 seconds to coincide with Floyd's funeral in Houston, Texas. The exchanges' observations were covered and joined by CNBC. It was the longest moment of silence ever held in the NYSE's 228-year history.

On June 3, 2020, the Los Angeles Dodgers of Major League Baseball announced they would light up Dodger Stadium for eight minutes and forty-six seconds to honor George Floyd.

=== Media ===
In solidarity with a music industry campaign, #TheShowMustBePaused, major streaming services Spotify, Apple Music, Amazon Music, and YouTube Music all scheduled special related programming to pay tribute to the murder of Floyd.

ViacomCBS aired an eight-minute-46-second-long quasi-public service announcement on 11 of their television channels at 5 p.m. EST on June 1, 2020. At the same time, children's television channel Nickelodeon, another ViacomCBS property, stopped programming for 8:46 and displayed a message in "support of justice, equality, and human rights."

On June 12, 2020, Netflix released 8:46, a video of newly recorded stand-up by comedian Dave Chappelle, in which he primarily tackles the topic of Floyd. On the same day, Vice News uploaded an 8-minute-46-second-long YouTube video showcasing the protests.

== See also ==
- Memorials to George Floyd
