= Lloyd George (disambiguation) =

David Lloyd George (1863–1945) was Prime Minister of the United Kingdom from 1916 to 1922.

Lloyd George may also refer to:

== People ==
=== As a compound surname ===
- Earl Lloyd-George of Dwyfor, a title in the peerage of the United Kingdom
- Frances Lloyd George (1888–1972), mistress, personal secretary, confidante and second wife of David Lloyd George
- Gwilym Lloyd George (1894–1967), British politician and cabinet minister
- Margaret Lloyd George (1864–1941) first wife of David Lloyd George
- Megan Lloyd George (1902–1966), Welsh politician
- Owen Lloyd George, 3rd Earl Lloyd-George of Dwyfor (1924–2010), British peer
- Richard Lloyd George, 2nd Earl Lloyd-George of Dwyfor (1889–1968), British soldier and peer
- William Lloyd George, 3rd Viscount Tenby (born 1927), British peer and former Army officer

=== As a given name and surname ===
- Lloyd D. George (1930–2020), United States District Judge
- Lloyd R. George (1925–2012), Arkansas politician

== Other uses ==
- Mount Lloyd George, British Columbia, Canada, named for David Lloyd George

== See also ==
- George Lloyd (disambiguation)
