= Save the Boards =

American nonprofit organization

- Formation: 2020
- Type: Nonprofit
- Origins: Aftermath of protests over the murder of George Floyd
- Website: savetheboards.org

Save the Boards is a small nonprofit organization based in Minneapolis, Minnesota that collects and preserves street art that emerged during local protests of the murder of George Floyd in 2020.

== Background ==
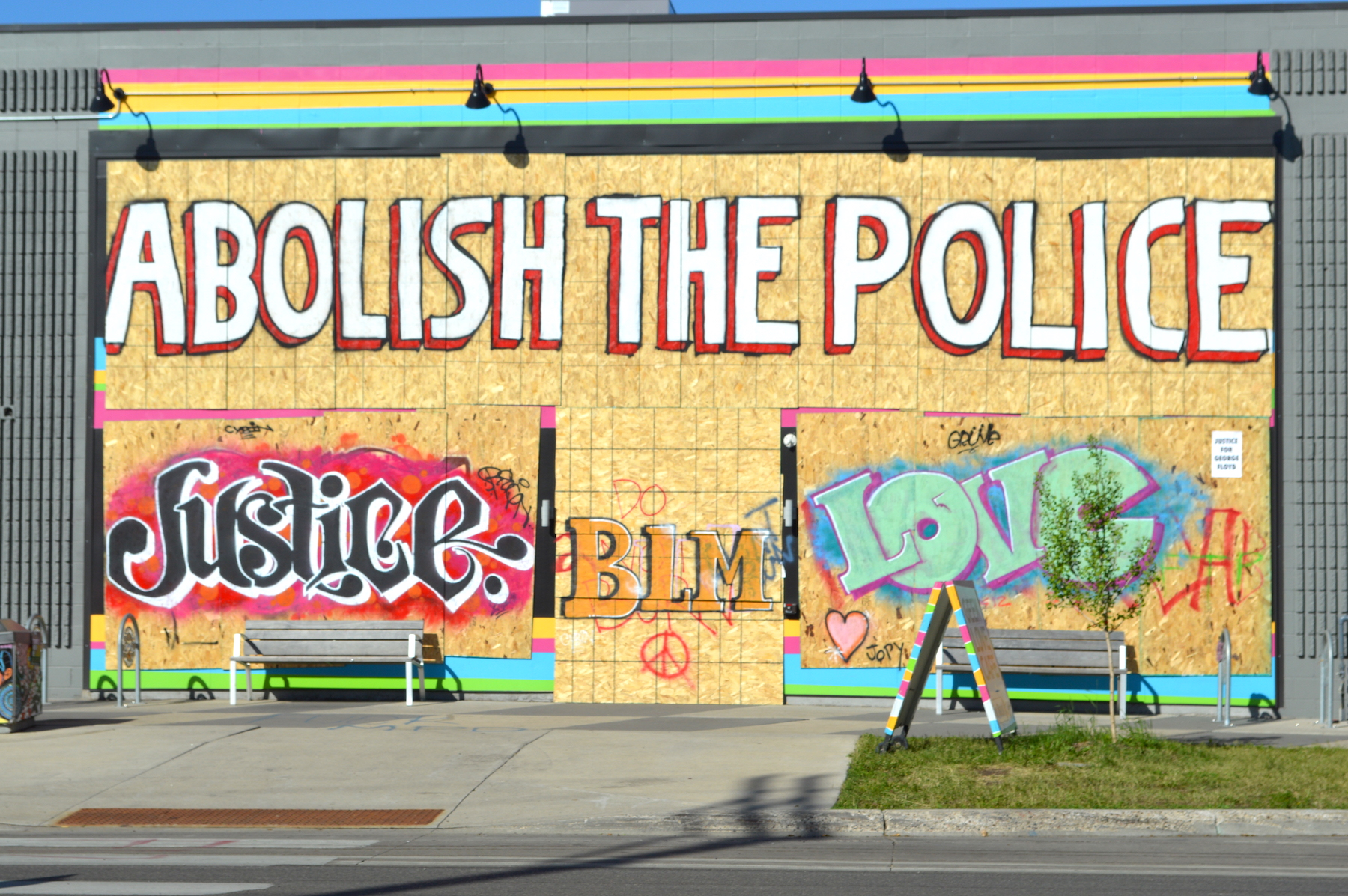
"The entrance of a Minneapolis bookstore, Moon Palace Books, boarded up and muralized in response to the George Floyd protests of 2020. This mural was collected and preserved by Save the Boards.

On May 25, 2020, George Floyd, a Black man, was killed by Minneapolis police officer Derek Chauvin. This prompted widespread social movements and protests across the country calling for the officers involved to be held accountable. The storefronts that lined the streets where people protested and rioted installed boards to shield the doors and windows from property damage. These boards however became blank canvasses for demonstrators to tell stories and express feelings through art. The boards conveyed messages, stories, and history. For example, one board read "NOT THE FIRST MURDER NOT THE LAST, STORMS THAT NEVER SEEM TO PASS..." Thus, various forms of these boards and other pieces of art were created to honor and remember George Floyd as well as other Black men and women who have died due to police violence, such as Ahmaud Arbery and Breonna Taylor. When the demonstrations started to dwindle, pieces of artworks that lined streets were left abandoned and exposed to the elements.

== History ==
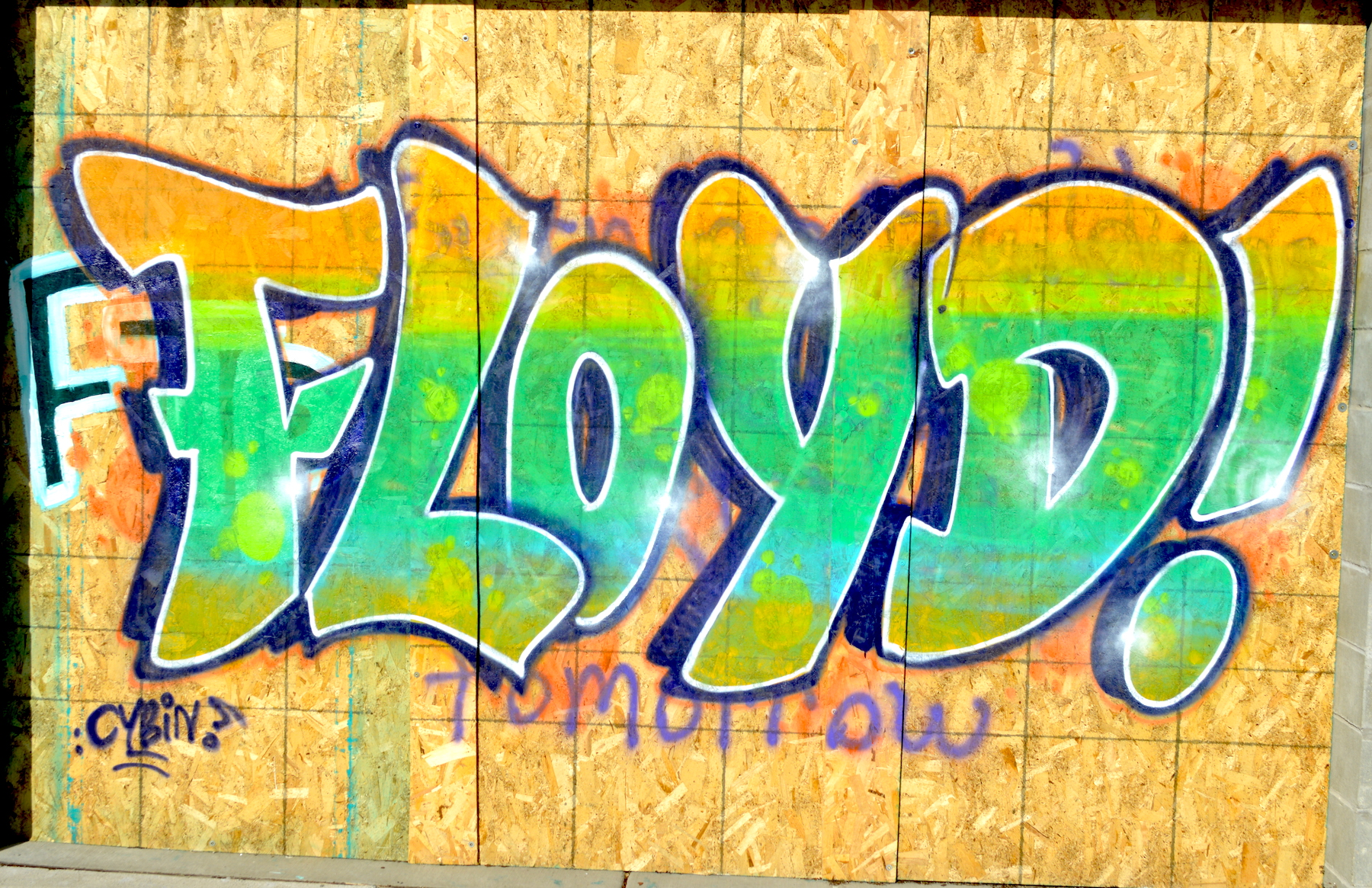
Street art created in response to George Floyd protests in Minneapolis, Minnesota. This mural was collected and preserved by Save the Boards.

Save the Boards began with the efforts of twenty-four year old Kenda Zellner-Smith. Zellner-Smith started the Save the Boards project to help lead to the preservation of the plywoods around Minneapolis that displayed the aftermath of Black art in response to the murder of George Floyd.

As a freshly graduated college student, Kenda Zellner-Smith enlisted the help of her roommate and friend, Emma Shepherd. Although Zellner-Smith began with a small amount of knowledge in art preservation and community organizing, she helped to organize the community's support and collect and preserve more than 800 plywood boards created during the protests.

Kenda Zellner-Smith has also joined the efforts of the Save the Boards project with the Memorialize the Movement's founder, Leesa Kelly. Memorialize the Movement was founded on May 25, 2020. It is a grassroots organization who also sought to preserve plywood murals as they functioned as a form of “protest”. Utilizing donations from the community, the women rented pickup trucks, Uhauls and storage units to collect and maintain the boards.

== Activities ==
=== Mission and future efforts ===
The mission of Save the Boards goes beyond collecting plywood according to Zellner-Smith. Despite efforts to collect the hard copies of the Black mural art, the long-term goal of Save the Boards is to create a “long-term multi-media” preservation of the boards and murals for a reminder of the Community's efforts for learning and healing after tragedy.

The way in which the organizers are achieving the long-term media is by taking photos of the boards to create a "digital archive in partnership with St.Paul based University of St. Thomas" In addition to the photographed boards, students are also documenting the information of the creators, location and timeline of the boards.

Zellner-Smith explains her future plans of the organization as “to activate boards throughout the Twin cities at local exhibitions, community events, workshops, and speaking events, promoting dialogue and reflection surrounding the importance of this art as a means of storytelling, and resistance against state-sanctioned violence”. The long-term display of the boards will allow them to continue tell the story of the 2020 uprisings of Minneapolis through the resistance of Black art.

=== Community engagement ===
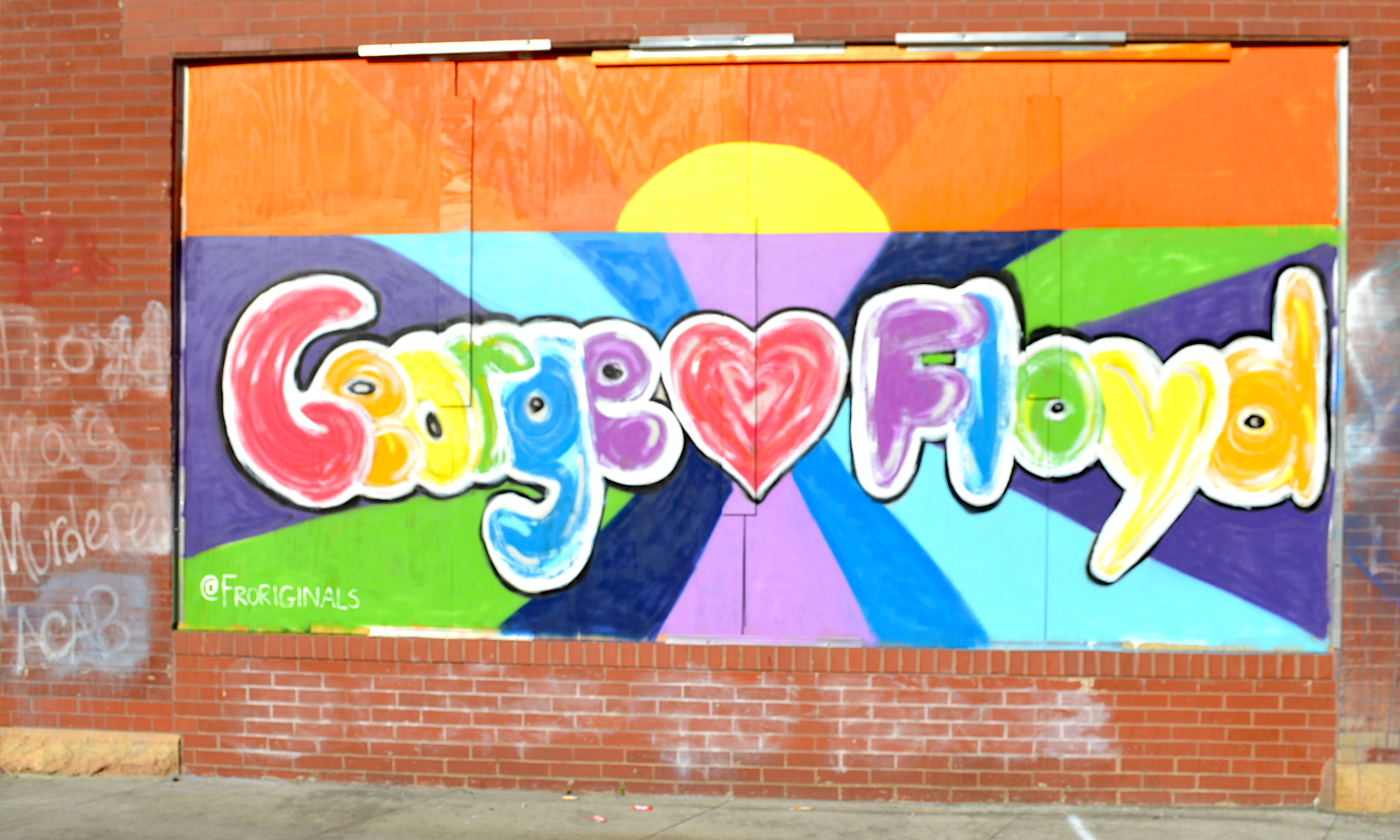
"A mural was painted on the boarded up Hook & Ladder Theater at 3010 Minnehaha Avenue in Minneapolis. This mural was collected and preserved by Save the Boards.

Save the Boards has collected and preserved over 1,000 plywood mural panels, organized community art events, and hosted workshops that focus on "cultivating BIPOC representation and visibility in conservation and preservation work." The organization has collaborated with professionals in the art conservation sector such as the Midwest Conservation Center, who said "a few pieces need minor repairs but most are in great shape, and will last for years with the proper care and storage."

In February 2021, Save the Boards collaborated with another art conservation project, Memorialize the Movement, and the Minnesota African American Heritage Museum and Gallery (MAAHMG), sponsored by the Hennepin County Library to have an open dialogue with the community about an upcoming free three-day outdoor public art exhibit at Phelps Park in Minneapolis scheduled for May 2021. The founders, Leesa Kelly and Kenda Zellner-Smith, shared their motivations and explained "why preserving these artworks are important to the Black community." The exhibit in May 2021 was titled "Justice for George: Messages from the People" featuring the plywood art murals created in 2020 following the murder of George Floyd by the Minneapolis police and live painting of new work. The event was partially funded by grants from the Metropolitan Regional Arts Council (MRAC) and the Minnesota Vikings. Founder Kenda Zellner-Smith expressed that "we [Save the Boards] had a huge outpouring of support and community and people outside the community come and rally for this cause."

=== Artist values and murals ===
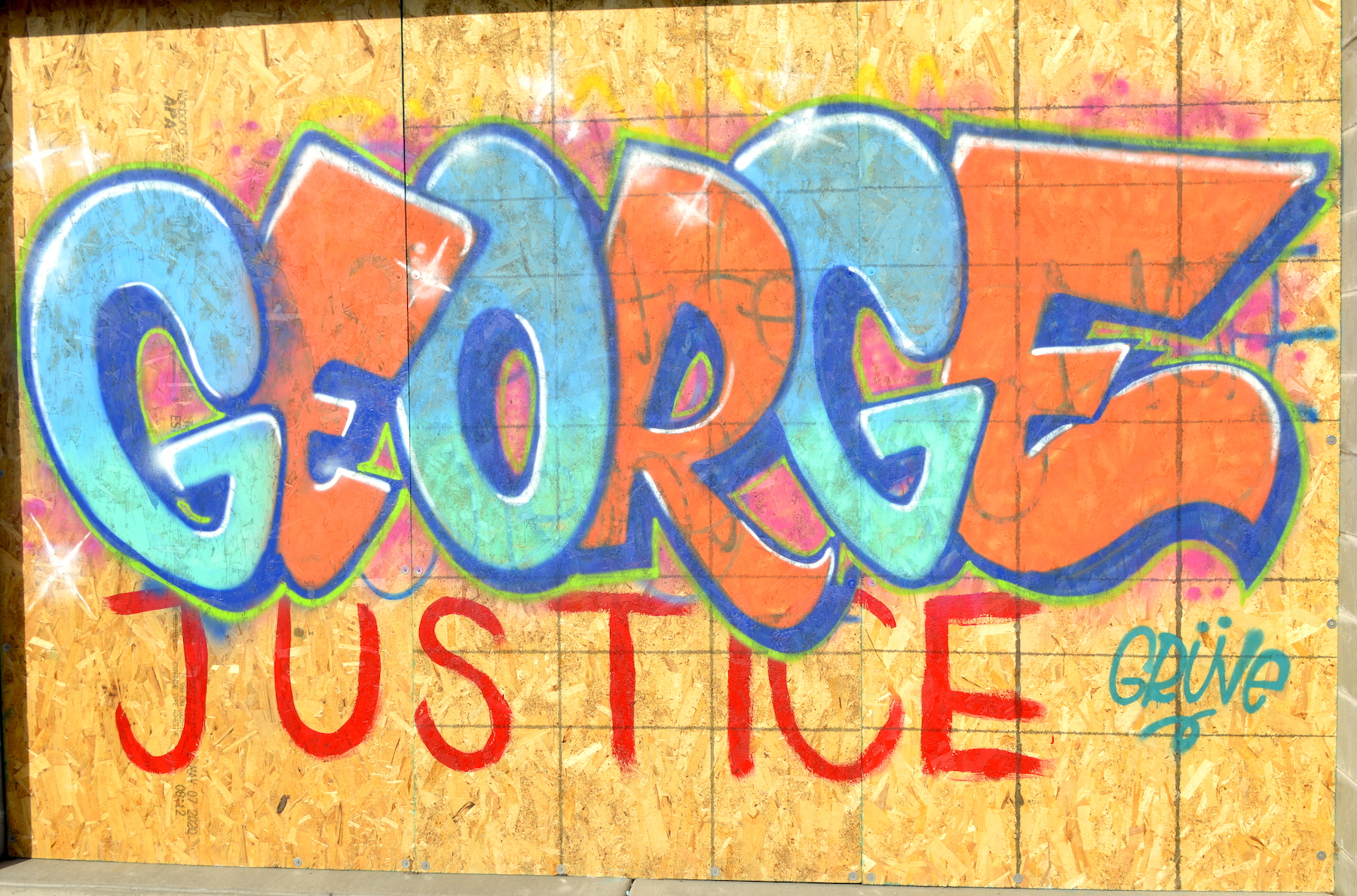
Street art generated in response to George Floyd protest in Minneapolis, Minnesota. This mural was collected and preserved by Save the Boards.

Save the Boards values “taking action with urgency in order to raise public awareness about police brutality”. The organization believes that art has long served a purpose to be a tool for opening up difficult conversations in the face of social unrest. According to Memorialize the Movement partner of Save the Boards, Leesa Kelly, “we need the story told in a way that people will absorb it. But not in a way that makes them feel comfortable”.

Save the Boards also calls to attention what they believe to be “manipulation of power and resources” through museums that struggle with equality in displaying marginalized stories. The organization thus declares that it will not function as a museum and will actively work to confront bias within the collection of the art. Since it is taking street art that may or may not be claimed, Save the Boards also acknowledges that any Black creators of the pieces may come forward and “retouch, reclaim, sell, keep, discard, showcase etc.” their work whenever they see fit.

== Value of street art ==
About 2,700 pieces of street art emerged around the world in response to George Floyd's murder. These pieces ranged from the site of his murder in Minneapolis, to across the globe in Syria. In Minneapolis, at the site where Floyd was arrested, three artists, Greta McLain, Xena Goldman and Cadex Herrera, helped to create one of the many plywood art murals that decorated the city after Floyd's murder. Outside Cup Foods, the mural (as pictured above) illustrates a portrait of Floyd along with a sunflower behind him. One of the artists is Cadex Herrera who as an educator and intervention specialist at an elementary school, commented that he felt he needed to contribute to something after Floyd's murder. Mclain argued that art served as a form of healing for the community by saying, "Art is therapy. Art can say things you cannot express with words. It brings the community together to reflect, to grieve, for strength and for support."

Street art especially murals, have been a long part of collective protest, and have typically served as a tool for "revolution, community building, and remembrance". Even across the world in Syria, artist Aziz Asmar, who created artwork in protest following George Floyd's murder, expressed similar sentiment saying, "Drawing is a world language everyone can understand," he says. "We are all brothers around the world, and we just want peace."

The Save the Boards mission works to preserve pieces of plywood boards that were created by artists such as McClain and Asmar. The organization believes that by collecting, documenting and distributing visual pieces of the art back into the community of Minneapolis it can further serve as visual storytelling as a reminder of community strength. The boards preserved "do not belong to anyone, person or business" but rather aim to serve as a collective gift of healing and unity to the community.

== See also ==
- 2020–2022 Minneapolis–Saint Paul racial unrest
- George Floyd and Anti-Racist Street Art database
- George Floyd Square occupied protest
