= Lisa Schroeder =

American chef and restaurateur

- Occupations: Chef; restaurateur
- Known for: Mother's Bistro, Mama Mia Trattoria

Lisa Schroeder is an American chef, restaurateur, and owner of Mother's Bistro in Portland, Oregon. Previously, she opened and owned the Italian restaurant Mama Mia Trattoria.

During Portland's George Floyd protests, Schroeder commissioned artist Xochilt Ruvalcaba to paint murals on the boards on Mother's Bistro as part of the Black Lives Matter art in Portland, Oregon.

== Bibliography ==
- Schroeder, Lisa; Centoni, Danielle (2009). Mother's Best: Comfort Food That Takes You Home Again. Taunton Press. ISBN 9781600850172.
