= Waldo Block =

Historic building in Portland, Oregon, U.S.

- U.S. National Register of Historic Places
- Portland Historic Landmark
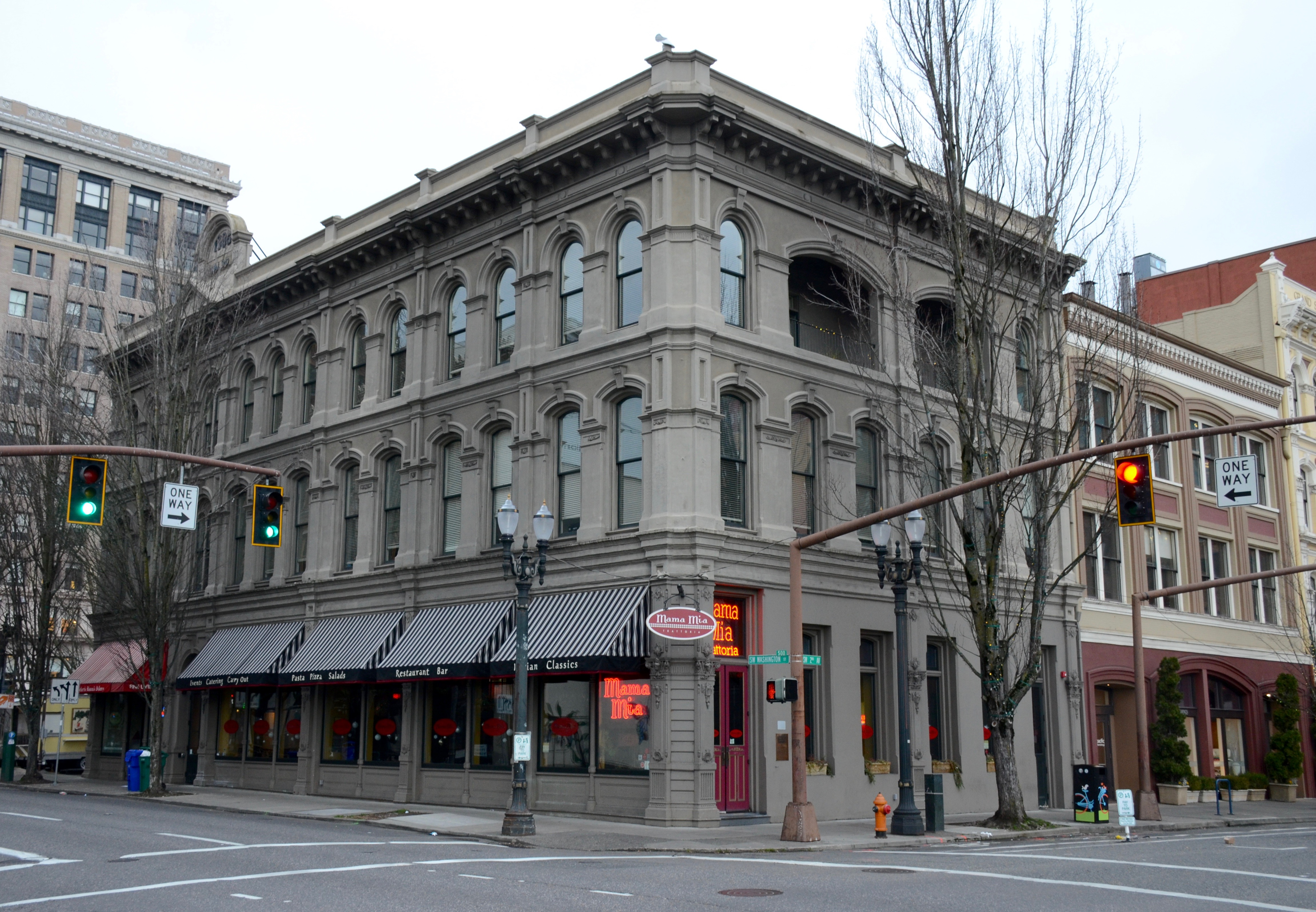
- Seen from the southeast in 2018

- Location within Portland, Oregon Location within Oregon Location within the United States
- Location: 431–433 SW 2nd Avenue; Portland, Oregon
- Coordinates: 45°31′10″N 122°40′27″W
- Area: 0.1 acres (0.040 ha)
- Built: 1886
- Architectural style: Italianate
- NRHP reference No.: 82003746
- Added to NRHP: April 29, 1982

The Waldo Block, located in downtown Portland, Oregon, is listed on the National Register of Historic Places.

The building's ground floor houses Mama Mia Trattoria.

== See also ==
- National Register of Historic Places listings in Southwest Portland, Oregon
