= We Stand with You =

2020 mural in Portland, Oregon, U.S.

- The mural on July 30, 2021
- Artist: Christian Grijalva
- Year: 2020
- Subject: Ahmaud Arbery; George Floyd; Breonna Taylor
- Location: Portland, Oregon, United States; 45.5507°N 122.6619°W

We Stand With You is a 2020 mural of Ahmaud Arbery, George Floyd, and Breonna Taylor by artist Christian Grijalva, installed in Portland, Oregon.

== Description ==
The mural by Christian Grijalva (also known as Firekat G) appears on the exterior of a grocery store along Martin Luther King Jr. Boulevard at Failing Street in northeast Portland's King neighborhood. The painting depicts Ahmaud Arbery, George Floyd and Breonna Taylor, and shows protesters holding signs with phrases like "strength," "black lives matter," and "let us breathe". According to the artist, "the rainbow abstract shapes are a nod to the LGBTQ community".

== History ==
The mural was originally painted over seven days in June 2020, in support of the George Floyd protests.

The painting was defaced in July 2021, with vandals covering faces in white paint and stenciling Patriot Front's website. Grijalva hosted a "paint party" to restore the mural; approximately a dozen people participated.

== See also ==
- Black Lives Matter art in Portland, Oregon
- Culture of Portland, Oregon
