= George Loyd =

American soldier (1843–1892)

- U.S. Army Medal of Honor (1862–1895)
- Born: 1843; County Tyrone, Ireland
- Died: December 17, 1892 (aged 48–49); Fort Riley, Kansas, U.S.
- Burial place: Fort Riley, Kansas
- Military career
- Allegiance: United States of America
- Branch: United States Army
- Service years: 1866 – 1892
- Rank: First sergeant
- Unit: 7th Cavalry Regiment
- Conflicts: Indian Wars; Battle of the Little Big Horn; Battle of Wounded Knee
- Awards: Medal of Honor

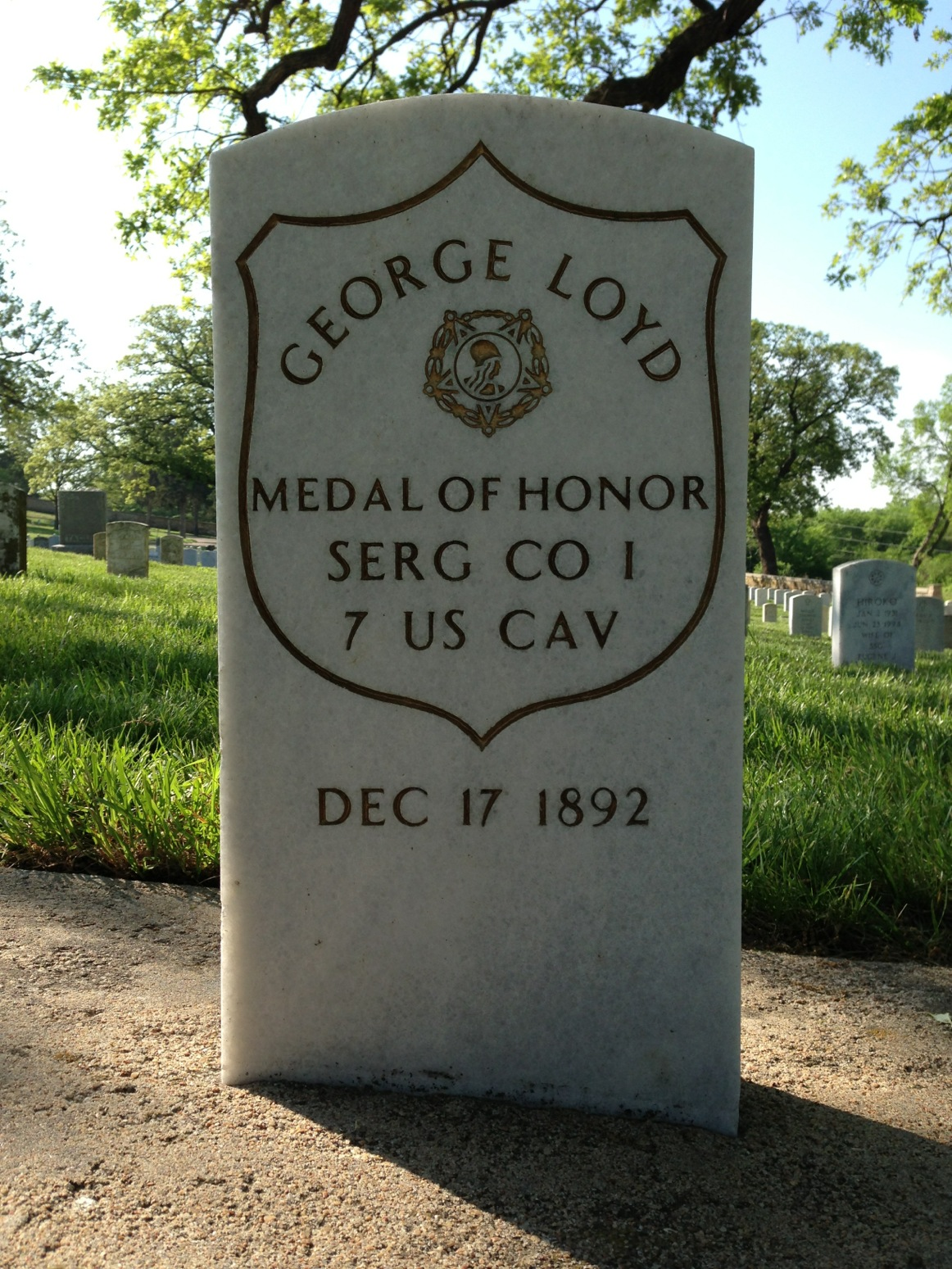
Gravestone at Fort Riley

George Loyd (1843 – December 17, 1892), whose last name was occasionally spelled "Lloyd," was a United States Army soldier. He fought in the Battle of the Little Big Horn and in the Battle of Wounded Knee, now called the Wounded Knee Massacre, receiving the Medal of Honor for his actions in the latter.

Loyd initially enlisted in the U.S. Army in March 1866. He re-enlisted in March 1869, April 1874, April 1879, April 1884, and April 1889, spending most of his adult life in military service. During the Battle of Wounded Knee, he suffered a lung injury. In December 1892, Loyd killed himself at Fort Riley, Kansas. At the time, he was one of the oldest soldiers at the Fort and held the rank of a First Sergeant.

== Biography ==
George Loyd was born in County Tyrone, Ireland in 1843. He immigrated to the U.S.

Loyd first enlisted in the U.S. Army (7th Cavalry Regiment) on March 17, 1866, in Philadelphia. He was discharged as a corporal in Canton, Texas, when his term of service expired on March 20, 1869. He re-enlisted on March 21, 1869, at Canton in the 6th Cavalry Regiment; he was discharged as a private on March 21, 1874, at Camp Supply, Indian Territory upon the expiration of his term of service.

Loyd's third enlistment was into Company G, 7th Cavalry on April 13, 1874, at St. Louis, Missouri. Loyd was a survivor of the Battle of the Little Big Horn on June 25–26, 1876; he was promoted to corporal on June 25, 1876. He was discharged as a sergeant on April 12, 1879, at Fort Abraham Lincoln, Dakota Territory when his term of service was completed.

Loyd immediately re-enlisted at Fort Abraham Lincoln and served until his five-year enlistment expired on April 12, 1884, at Fort Totten, Dakota Territory. He re-enlisted on April 15, 1884, at Fort Totten and served until discharged as a sergeant on April 14, 1889 Fort Riley, Kansas.

"Geo" Loyd re-enlisted on April 15, 1889, at Fort Riley. He was among the cavalrymen ordered to capture Chief Big Foot. On December 29, 1890, troopers surrounded the Sioux camp on Wounded Knee Creek with the intention of arresting the Sioux chieftain and disarming his followers. Loyd, a sergeant on the day of the ensuing Wounded Knee Massacre, was commended for bravery, especially after suffering a wound to his lung; On April 16, 1891, Loyd was awarded the Medal of Honor.

On December 17, 1892, slightly less than two years after the massacre, First Sergeant Loyd, then one of the oldest soldiers at Fort Riley, Kansas, died by suicide and was buried at the Fort Riley post cemetery.

== Medal of Honor citation ==
The President of the United States of America, in the name of Congress, takes pleasure in presenting the Medal of Honor to Sergeant George Lloyd, United States Army, for bravery, especially after having been severely wounded through the lung on 29 December 1890, while serving with Company I, 7th U.S. Cavalry, in action at Wounded Knee Creek, South Dakota.

== See also ==
- List of Medal of Honor recipients for the Indian Wars
- American Indian Wars
