= Apple Pioneer Place =

Apple Store in Portland, Oregon, U.S.

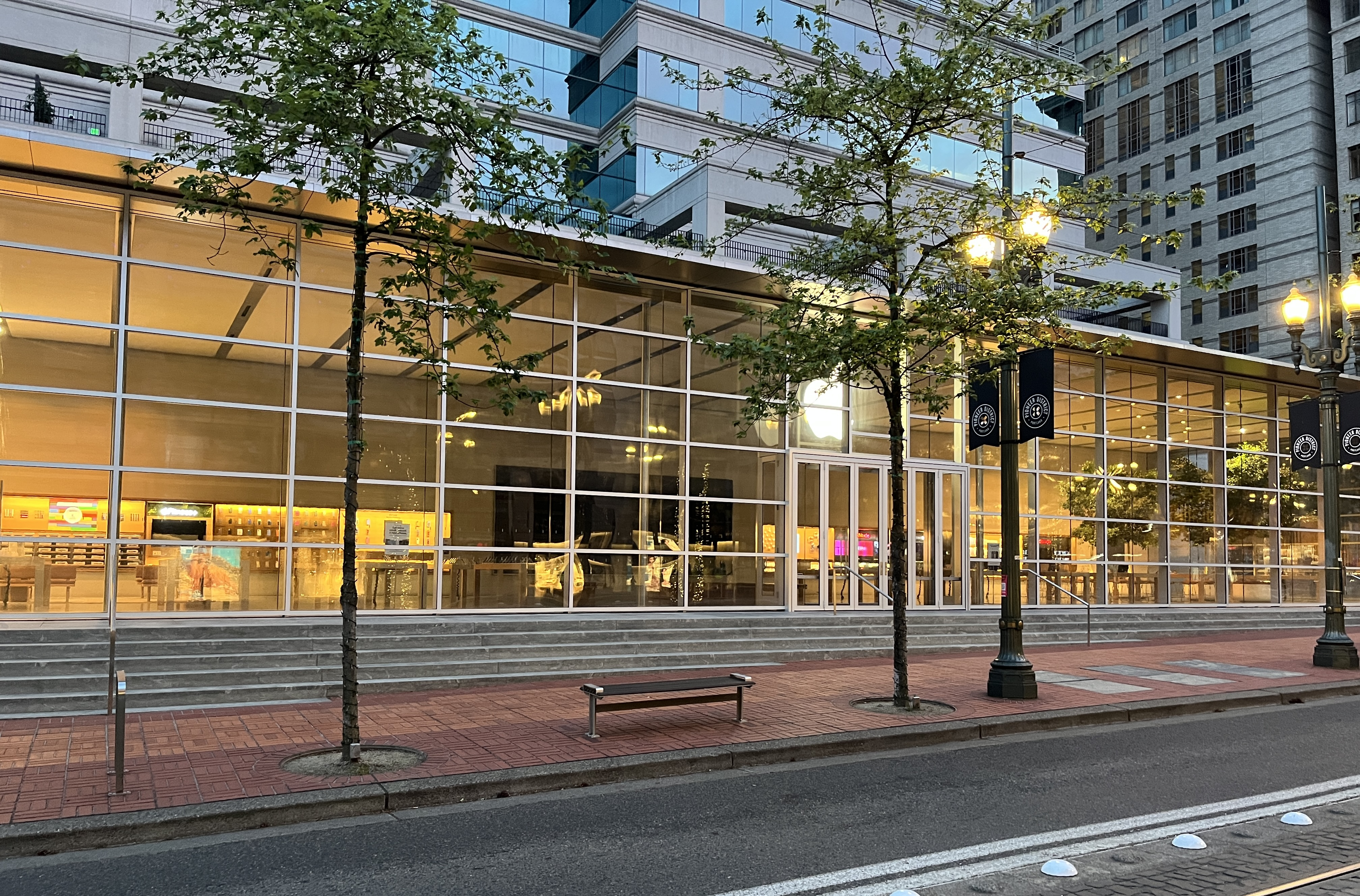
- The store's exterior at Pioneer Place in May 2025
- Interactive map of the Apple Pioneer Place area

General information
- Status: Operational
- Location: Portland, Oregon, U.S., 450 Southwest Yamhill Street, Portland, Oregon
- Coordinates: 45.5178°N 122.6775°W
- Opened: 2014

Design and construction
- Architect: Bohlin Cywinski Jackson
- Developer: General Growth Properties

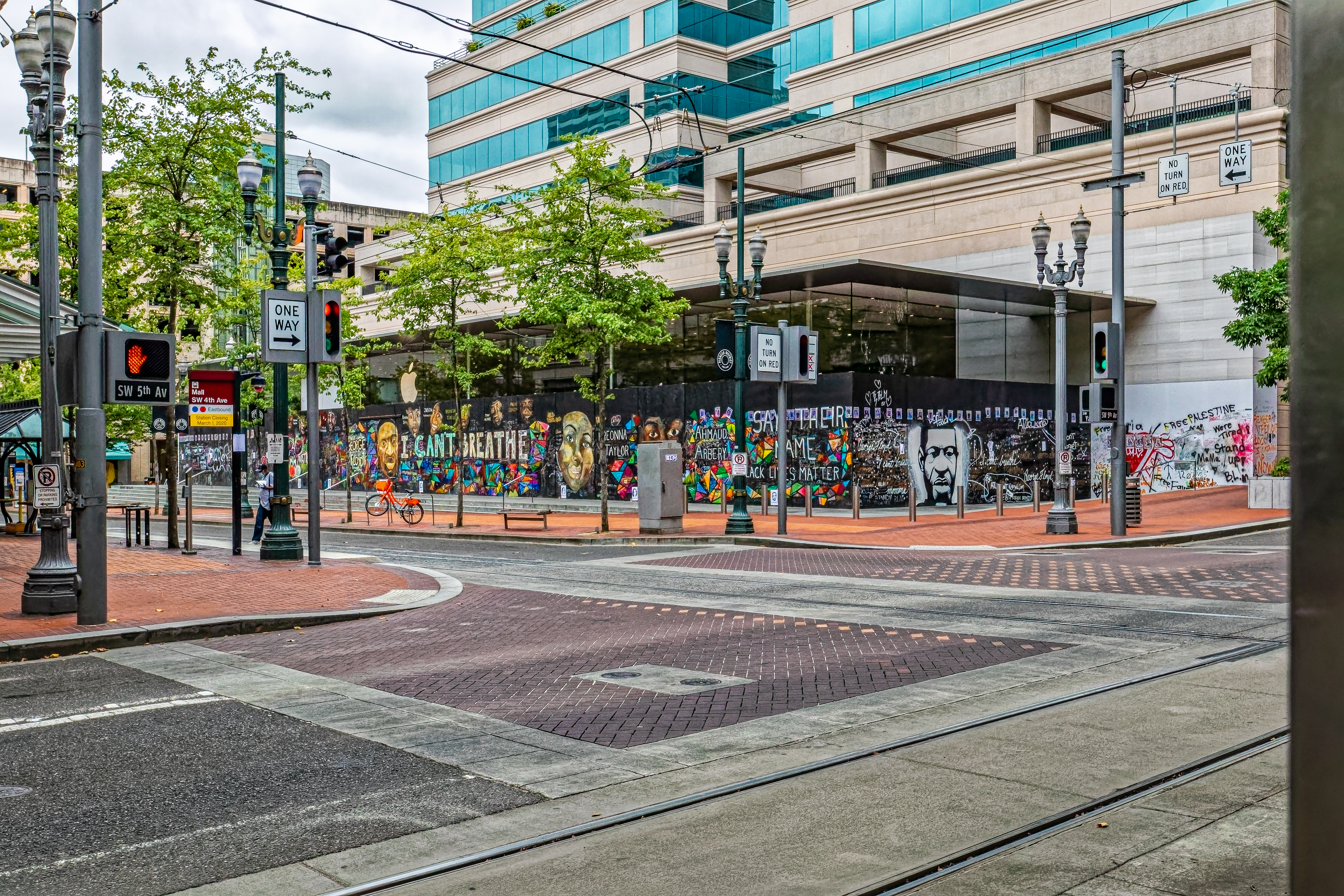
Exterior with the George Floyd mural, 2020

Apple Pioneer Place is an Apple Store, a retail outlet of Apple, in downtown Portland, Oregon, United States.

== Description ==
Apple Pioneer Place is located at the intersection of Southwest Fifth Avenue and Yamhill Street in downtown Portland. The 23,000-square-foot space has 20-foot-tall windows.

== History ==
The store opened in 2014, where Saks Fifth Avenue previously operated. In 2019, the store closed for approximately two months for a remodel. The store also closed temporarily during the COVID-19 pandemic. A mural installed outside the store during the George Floyd protests was later donated to Don't Shoot Portland.

A metal fence was added in February 2021. A new facade was later constructed. A fire was set outside the building in 2021. The shop re-opened with plastic windows in 2023.

In 2025, dozens of people gathered outside the store on Black Friday, "protesting what they claim is the tech company’s complicity with Immigration and Customs Enforcement and the Trump administration", according to KOIN.

== Reception ==
Dave Smith ranked the store nineteenth in Business Insider's 2019 list of the world's thirty "most beautiful" Apple stores.
