= Lists of George Floyd protests =

There are two lists of George Floyd protests:

- List of George Floyd protests in the United States
- List of George Floyd protests outside the United States
