= Memorials to George Floyd =

George Floyd was an African American man who was murdered by a Minneapolis police officer on May 25, 2020. He was memorialized via events, protests, artwork installations, organizations, official designations, and campaigns.

== Funeral services ==
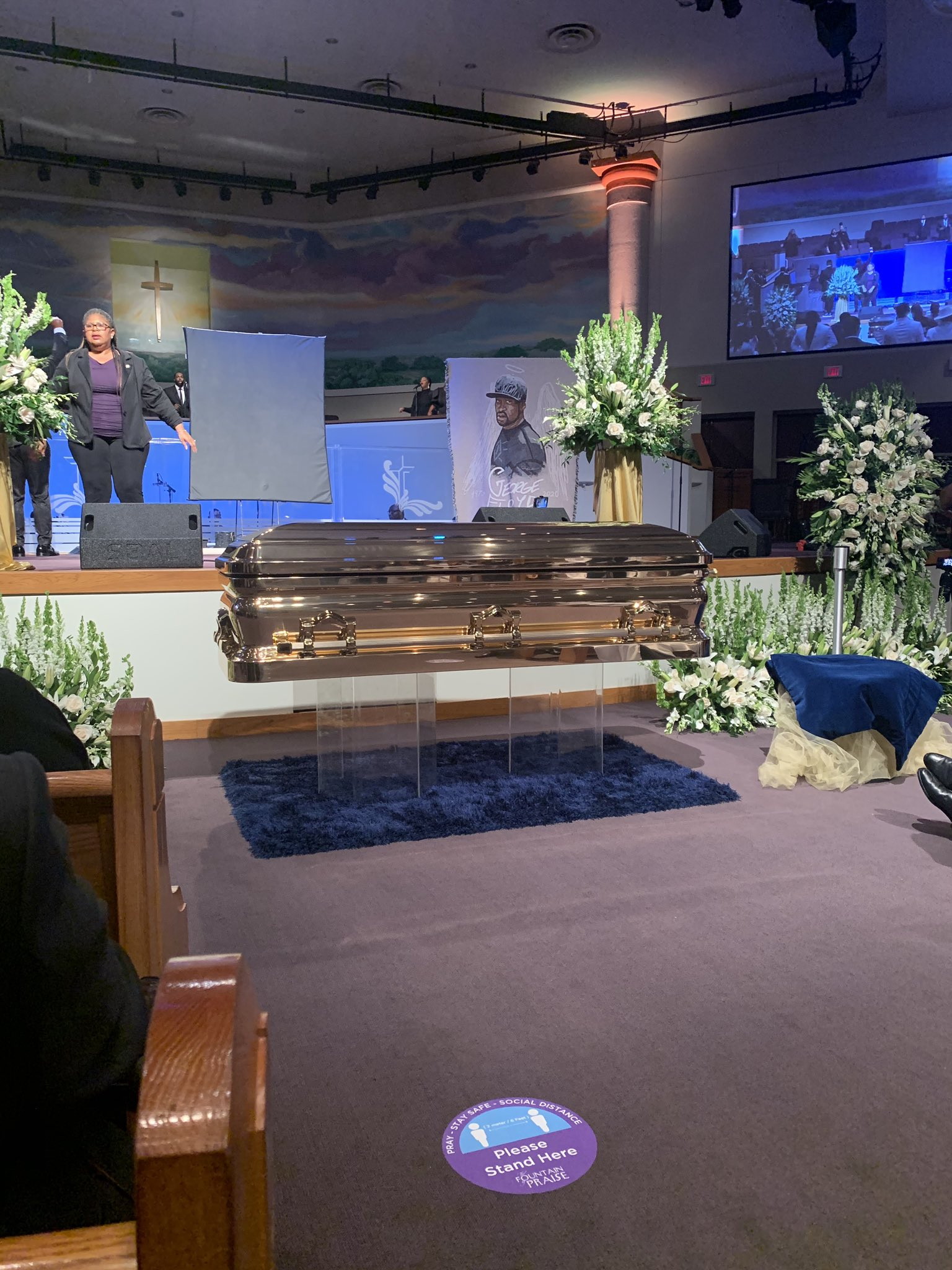
Floyd's casket on display in Houston, Texas, June 9, 2020

A public memorial, with Al Sharpton delivering the eulogy, was held June 4, 2020, at North Central University in Minneapolis, Minnesota. Many state and local officials attended, including Minnesota governor Tim Walz, U.S. senators Amy Klobuchar and Tina Smith, U.S. representative Ilhan Omar, Saint Paul mayor Melvin Carter, Minneapolis mayor Jacob Frey, and police chief Medaria Arradondo. The service also drew national officials and civil rights leaders, such as Martin Luther King III, Reverend Jesse Jackson, as well as several celebrity figures.

A public viewing and a family memorial was held in Raeford, North Carolina, on June 6, near Floyd's hometown.

Floyd's family held a public memorial in Houston, Texas, on June 8 that was livestreamed globally, and a private service on June 9. Professional boxer Floyd Mayweather paid for the services. Floyd's body was on public view on June 8 in his hometown of Houston. Former Vice President and the 2020 presumptive and eventual Democratic nominee, Joe Biden, met with the Floyd family privately and gave a video message at the funeral.

Floyd is buried next to his mother at Houston Memorial Gardens Cemetery in Pearland, Texas.

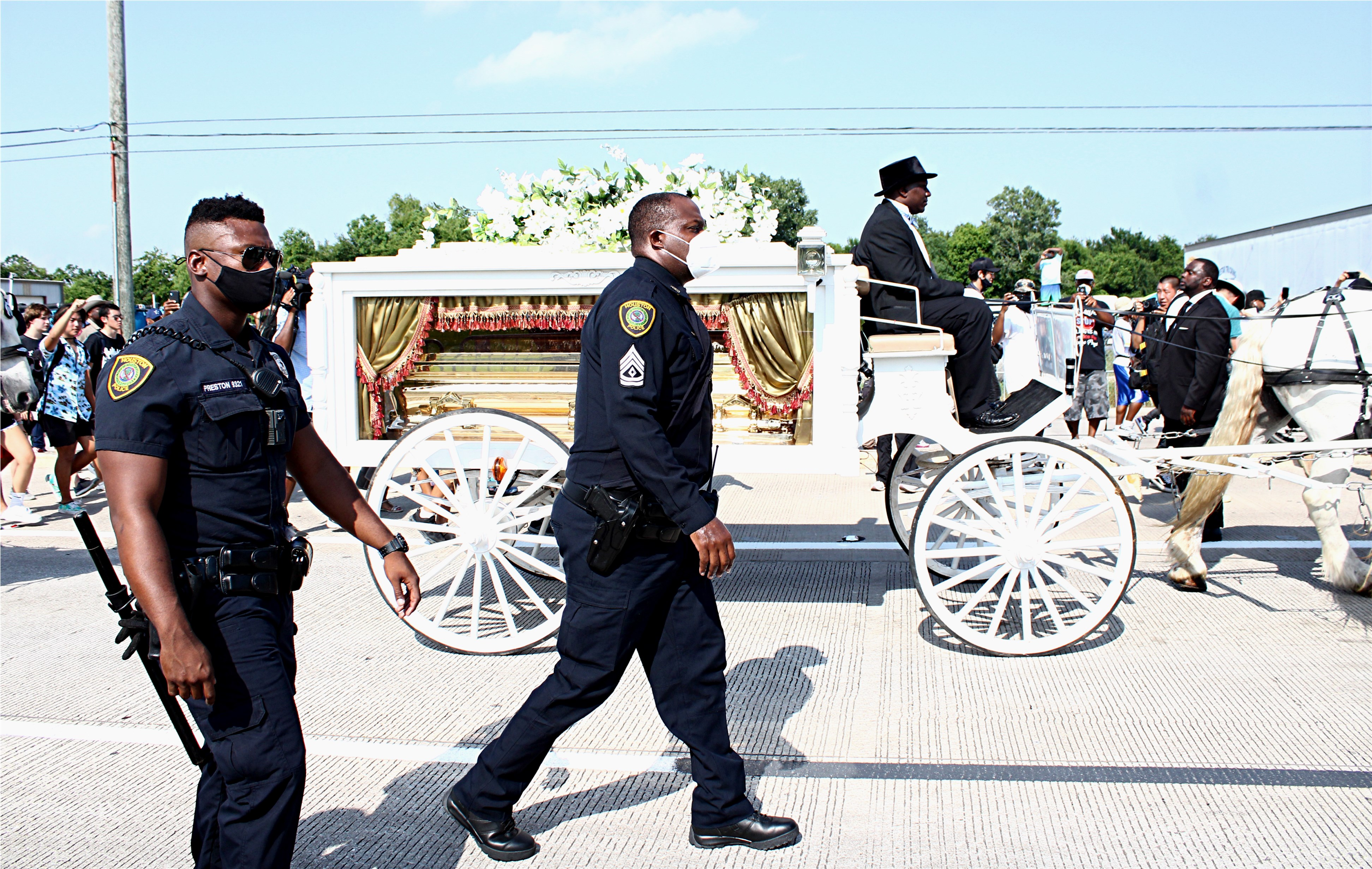
The carriage carrying Floyd's casket to his burial in Pearland, Texas, June 9, 2020

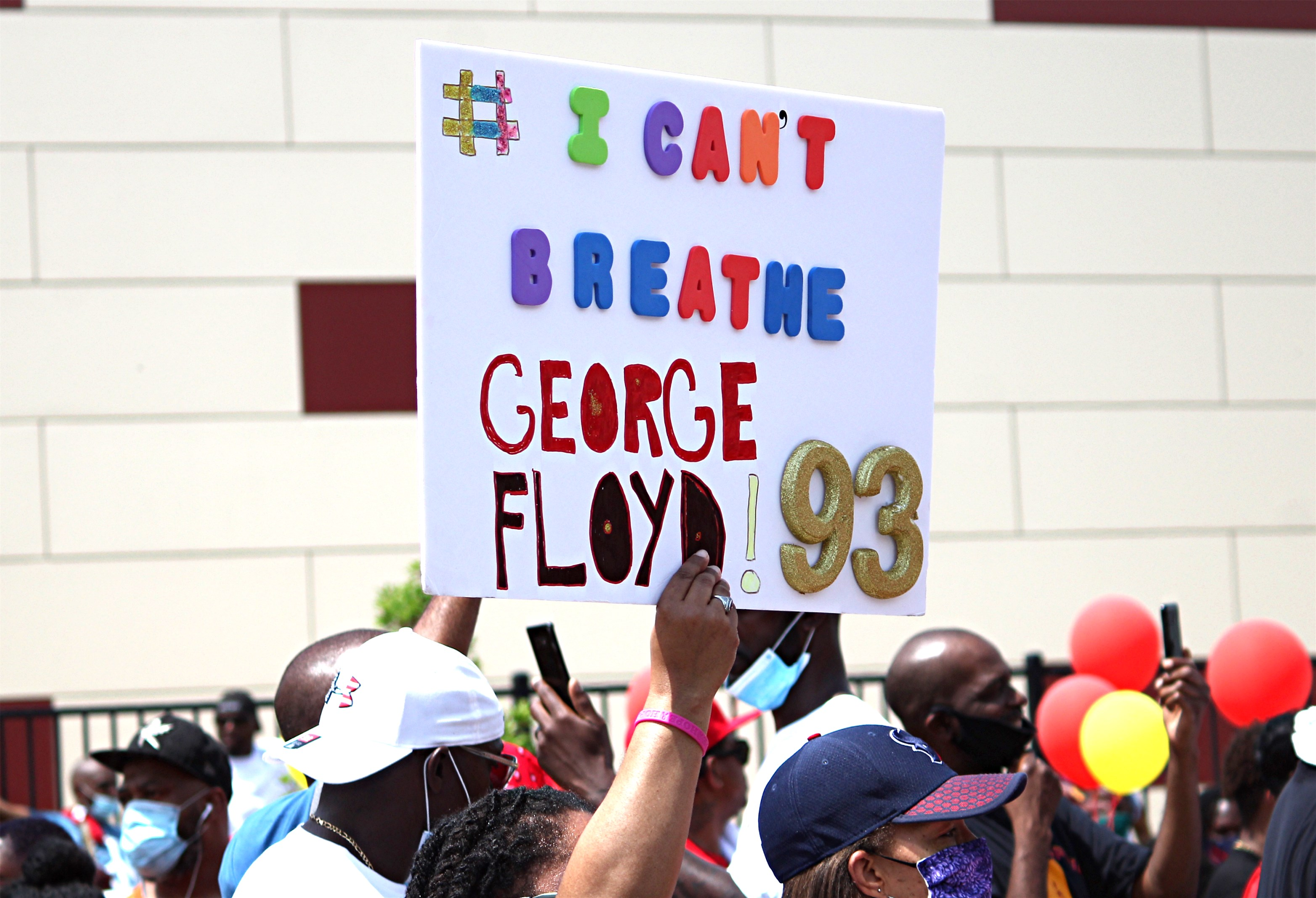
A memorial vigil at Yates High School, from which Floyd graduated, in Houston, Texas

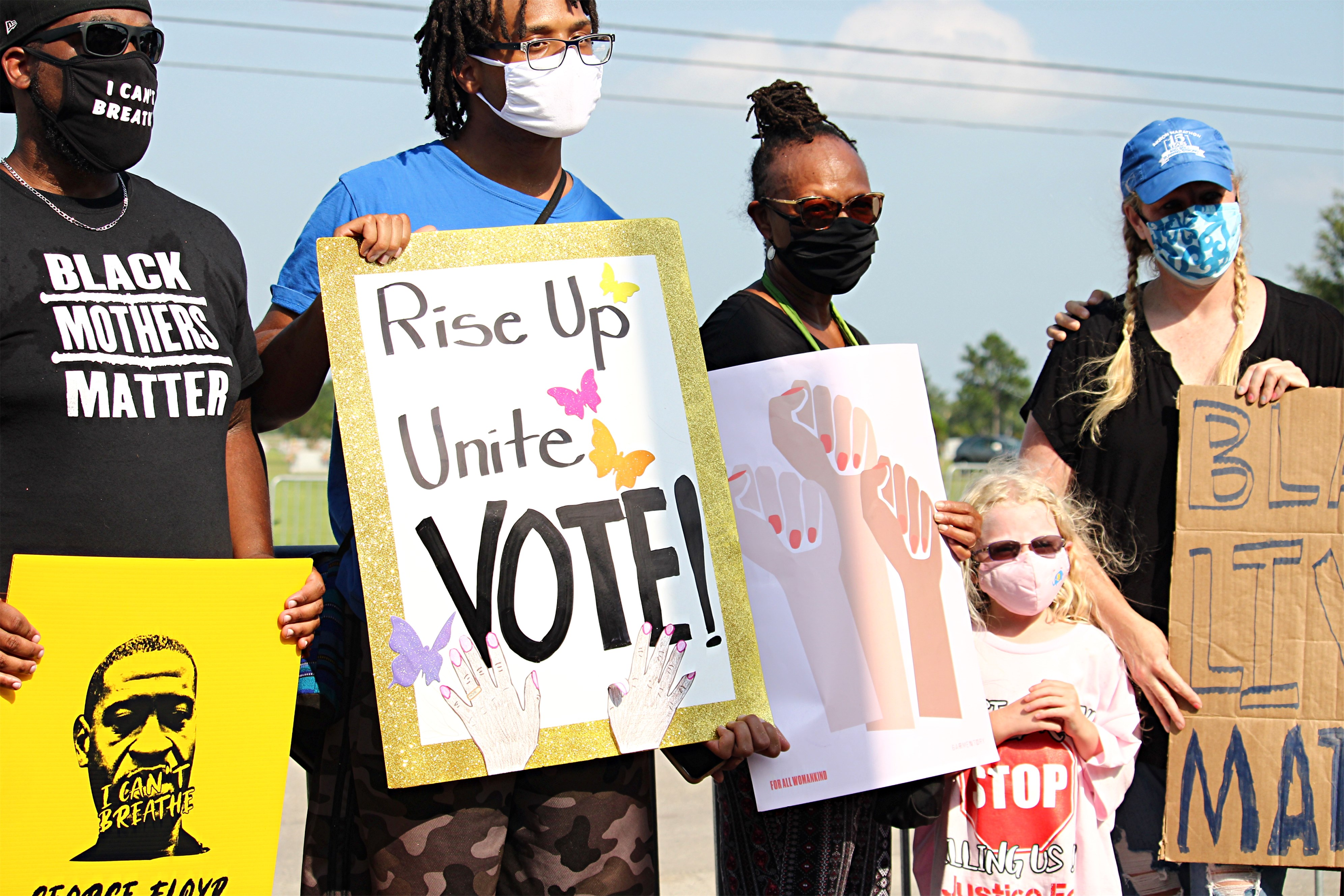
Along Floyd's funeral procession route in Pearland, Texas, on June 9, 2020

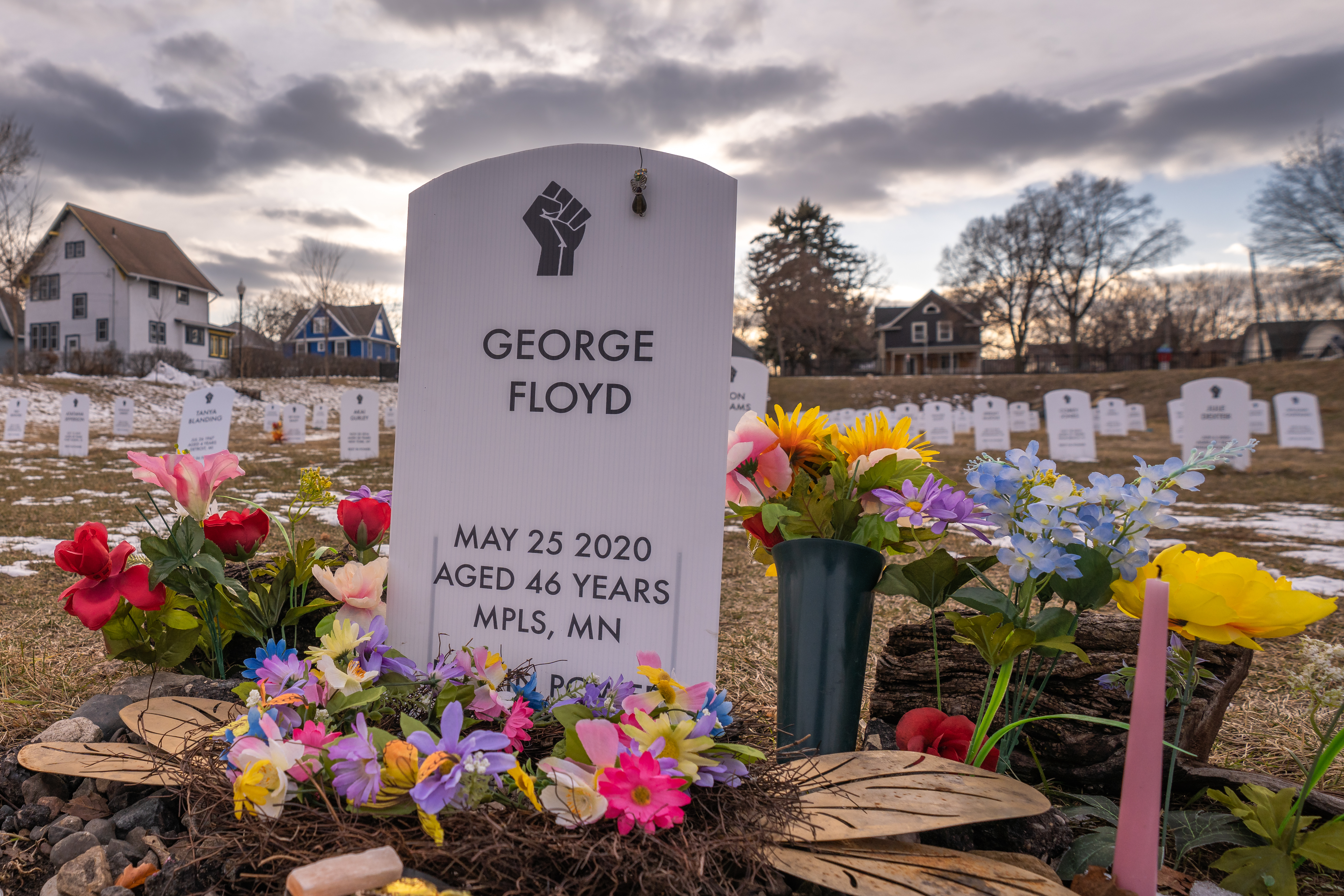
Symbolic headstone, Minneapolis, Minnesota

== Official declarations ==
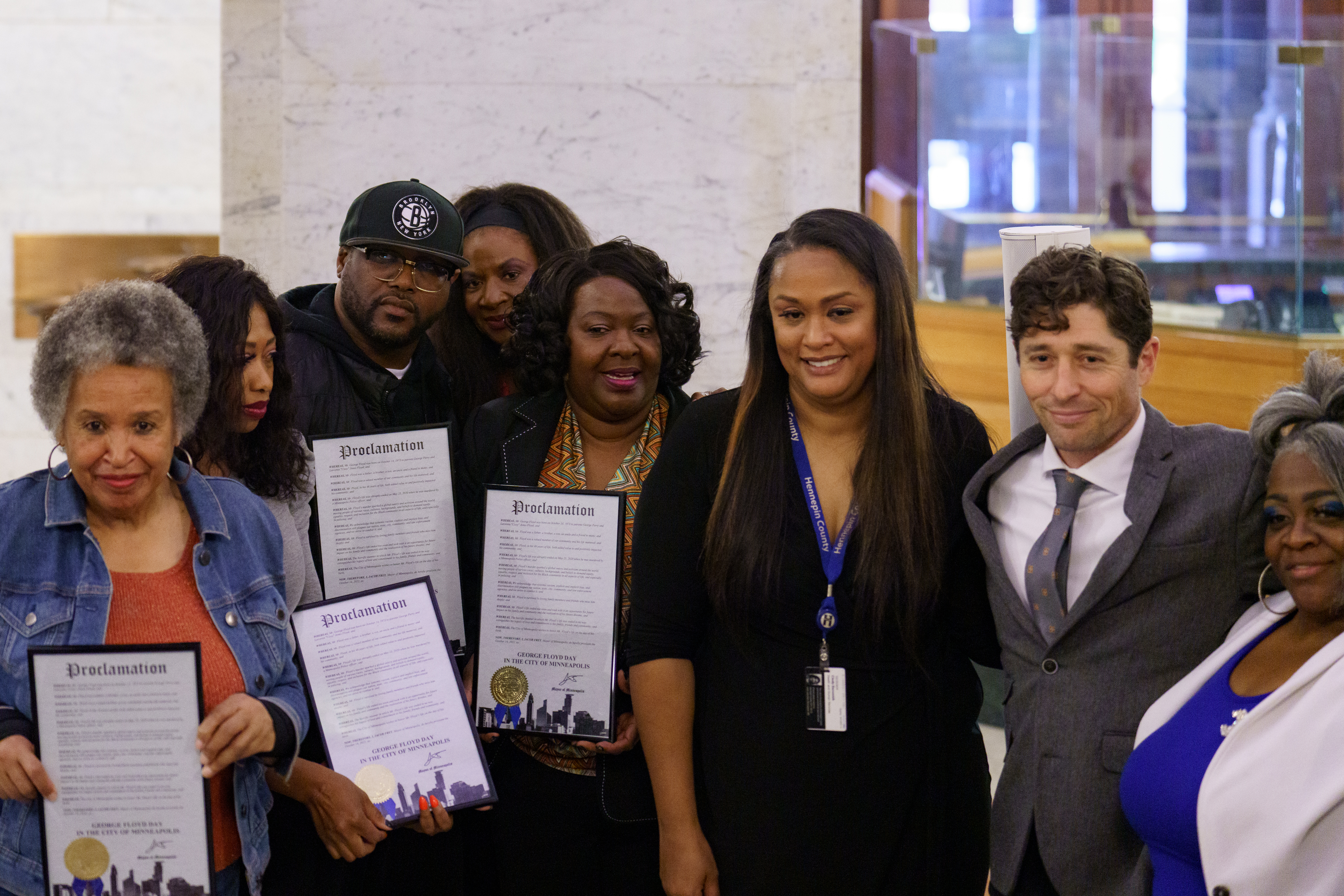
George Floyd's family with Minneapolis mayor Jacob Frey, October 14, 2022

On June 9, 2020, Minnesota governor Tim Walz issued a statewide proclamation declaring 8 minutes 46 seconds of silence at 11:00 a.m. CDT to coincide with the beginning of Floyd's funeral in Houston. On May 24, 2021, on the one-year anniversary of Floyd's murder, Walz declared a statewide moment of silence for 9 minutes and 29 seconds for 1:00 p.m. On October 14, 2022, Minneapolis mayor Jacob Frey declared it George Floyd Day on the date of what would have been Floyd's 49th birthday.

== Organizations ==
Rise and Remember, formerly the George Floyd Global Memorial, is a 501(c)3 organization in Minneapolis, Minnesota, with a headquarters office on the 3500 block of Chicago Avenue. The organization acts as a curator of the demonstrator-installed art exhibits at George Floyd Square. Its mission is to inventory, collect, and preserve the public art installations and the approximately 5,000 offerings that were left by visitors.

The George Floyd Memorial Foundation is a non-profit organization founded by George Floyd's sister, Bridgett Floyd, in Mooresville, North Carolina.

The George Floyd Community Benevolence Fund, later renamed the Ward 8 Community Benevolence Fund, is a non-profit organization of Floyd's family and estate. The fund was seeded from $500,000 of the $27 million wrongful death settlement between the City of Minneapolis and George Floyd's family. The fund has awarded grants of between $5,000 and $25,000 to organizations and businesses to the neighborhood surrounding the East 38th Street and Chicago Avenue South in Minneapolis where Floyd was murdered.

== Protests and campaigns ==
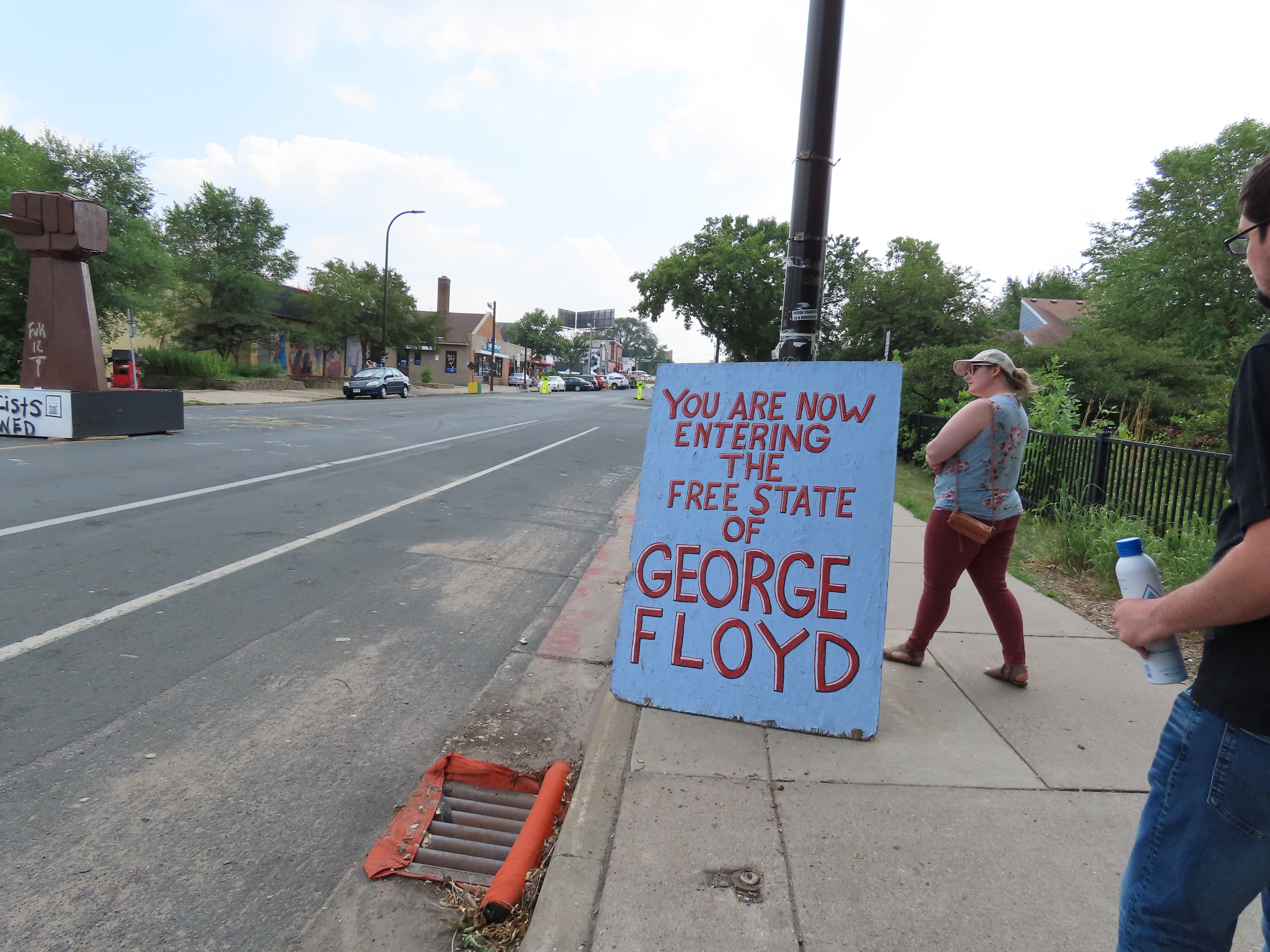
A sign at the George Floyd Square occupied protest in Minneapolis, Minnesota

The George Floyd protests began in Minneapolis on May 26, 2020. Protests were held in the United States and in other countries in reaction to Floyd's murder and in his memory. The street intersection where Floyd was murdered was held by demonstrators during the George Floyd Square occupied protest.

"Justice for George Floyd”, a Change.org petition, as launched on May 30, 2020. As of early July 2020, the petition had nearly 19 million signatures, making it the most signed petition in the history of the platform.

Official George Floyd Memorial Fund was established by Philonise Floyd, George Floyd's brother, in the aftermath of the murder to cover funeral expenses and education expenses for Floyd's children. One week after the tragedy and only four days after the start of the fund, it raised $7 million, putting it in ranking as one of the most highly funded GoFundMe campaigns at the time.

Commitment March: Get Your Knee Off Our Necks was an event held in Washington, D.C., on August 28, 2020. The march was organized by the National Action Network, and was led by Al Sharpton and Martin Luther King III. The march's speakers included relatives of George Floyd, Breonna Taylor, Jacob Blake, and others.

== Scholarships ==
Colleges and universities which have created scholarships in Floyd's name included North Central University, Alabama State, Oakwood University, Missouri State University, Southeast Missouri State, Ohio University, Buffalo State College, Copper Mountain College, and others.

== Slogans ==
Eight minutes and 46 seconds, the length of time that Derek Chauvin was originally reported to have had his knee on Floyd's neck, was widely commemorated as a "moment of silence" to honor Floyd. It was also used in chants, protest signs, and messages.

Slogans and phrases such as "Justice for George", "I can't breathe", "Black Lives Matter", and "No justice, no streets", among others, were also used in protests and campaigns about Floyd's murder.

== Art ==
Thousands of works of street art were created in the aftermath of Floyd's murder. George Floyd and Anti-Racist Street Art database was created by researchers at the University of St. Thomas as a free virtual art library for the works of art created around the world. Each artwork is identified with the artist, the story behind its creation, and where it is located. Save the Boards, a nonprofit organization based in Minneapolis, was formed to collect and preserve street and murals on boards.

=== Murals ===
Artists created several murals of George Floyd in the aftermath of his murder.

In Minneapolis, Minnesota, two George Floyd murals were painted at the street intersection in Minneapolis where he was murdered. A blue and yellow mural of George Floyd on the side of the Cup Foods grocery store became one of the most recognizable images of the global protest movement that was sparked by his murder, and a digital rendering of it served as a backdrop to his casket at his funeral in Houston, Texas. Created by community artists Cadex Herrera, Greta McLain, and Xena Goldman, the iconic mural was one of the first public artworks to emerge in Minneapolis that honored Floyd's memory in Minneapolis. Peyton Scott Russell, a Minneapolis native and street artist, created a 12-by-12-foot (3.7 by 3.7 m) black-and-white mural of Floyd's face in June 2020. Pictures of the mural were shared worldwide.

The George Floyd mural in Portland, Oregon, was painted by Emma Berger and installed outside Apple Pioneer Place in downtown Portland, on June 1, 2020 (since removed). She completed the mural, which depicted Floyd and the phrase "I can't breathe", in approximately two hours and without seeking permission. Berger later added the faces of Ahmaud Arbery and Breonna Taylor, as well as the phrases "black lives matter" and "say their names". The image of Floyd was 8-foot (2.4 m) tall.

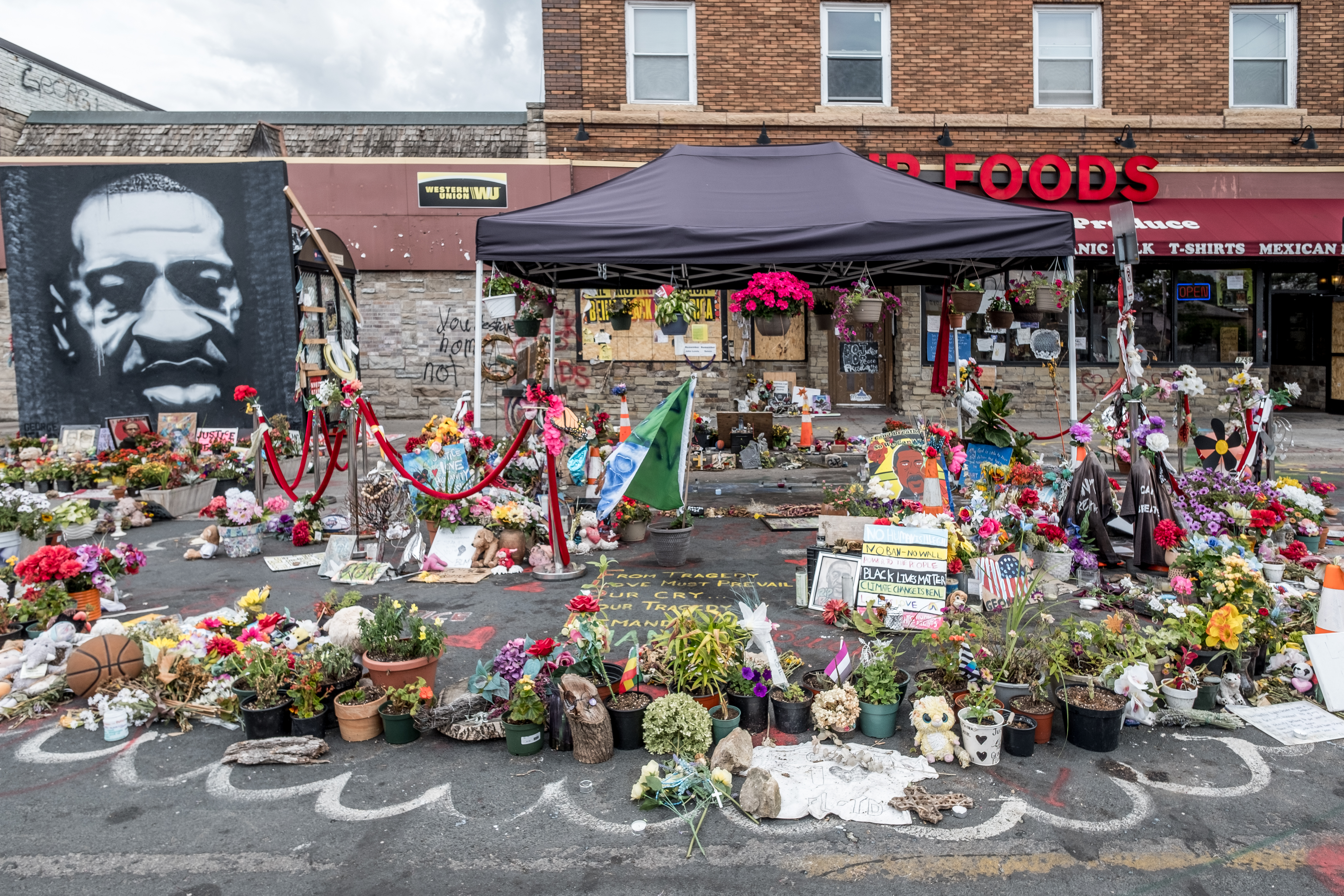
Black-and-white mural in Minneapolis, Minnesota

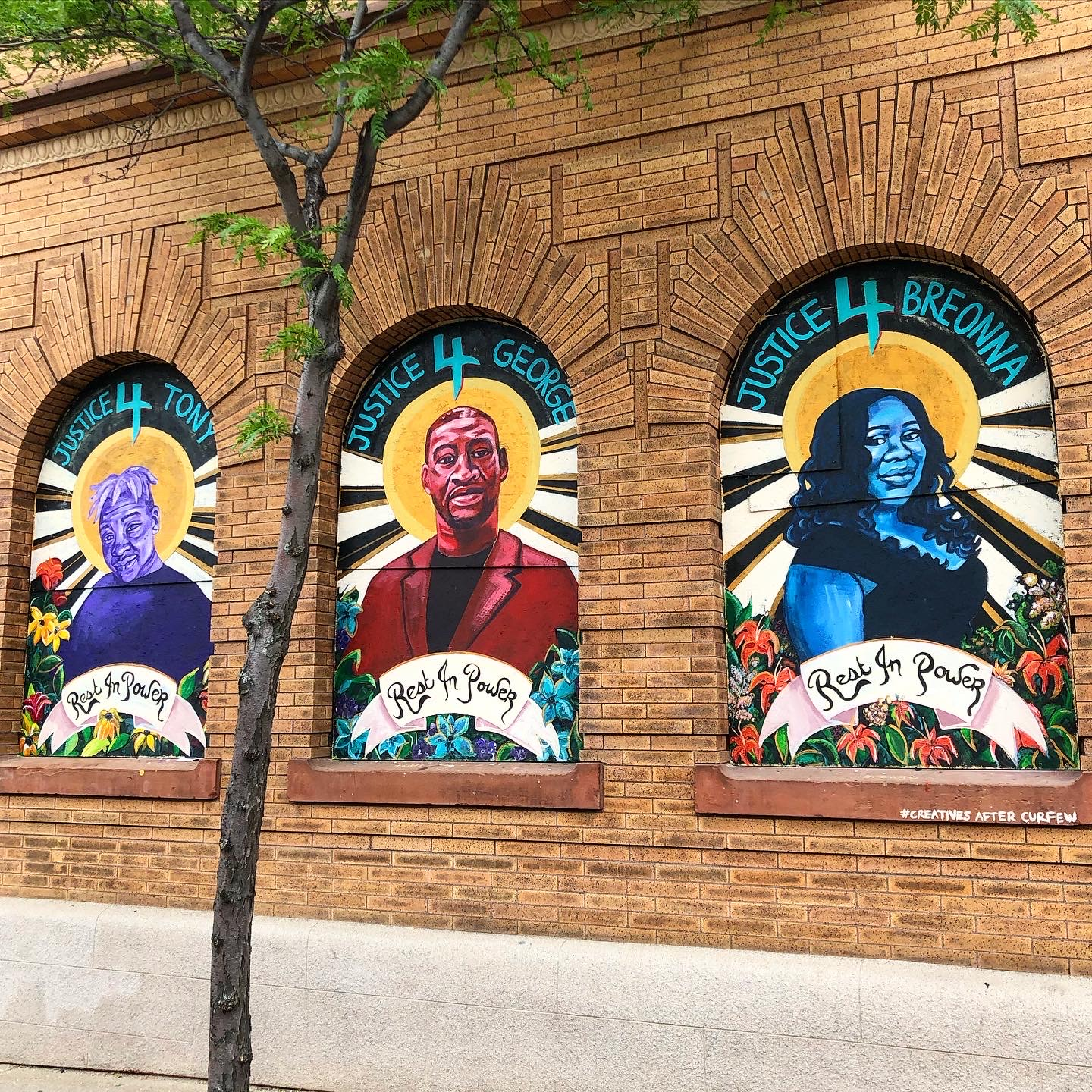
George Floyd, Tony McDade, and Breonna Taylor in Minneapolis, Minnesota

=== Sculpture ===
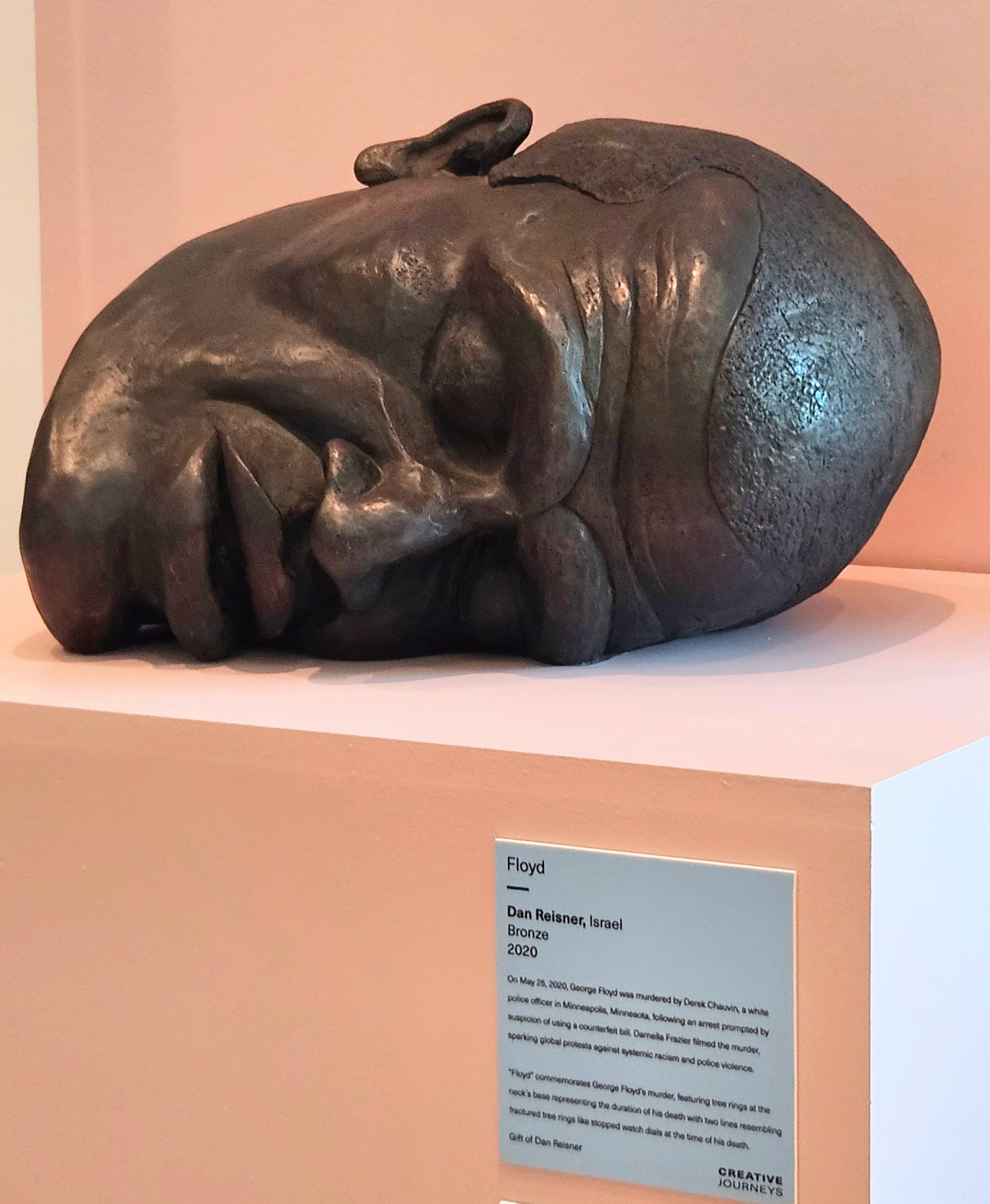
A sculpture of Floyd by Israeli artist Dan Reisner

A bust of George Floyd is situated in Union Square in New York City. The sculpture sits on a marble base, with the 6-foot (1.8 m) bust being made of layers of plywood. It was created by artist Chris Carnabuci and unveiled by Floyd's brother Terrence, as part of the 2021 Juneteenth federal holiday.

A statue of George Floyd is situated in Newark, New Jersey. It was completed by Stanley Watts and unveiled in 2021. Located outside Newark's City Hall, it weighs 700 pounds (320 kg), and is sculpted larger than life. The statue is of Floyd sitting relaxed on a bench.

On May 22, 2024, the sculpture "Floyd" was unveiled at the International African American Museum (IAAM) in Charleston, South Carolina. Created by Dan Reisner in 2020, shortly after the tragic incident in Minneapolis, Minnesota." Floyd", Commemorates George Floyd's murder, featuring tree rings at the neck's base representing the duration of his death with two lines resembling fractured tree rings like stopped watch dials at the time of his death.

== Street ==
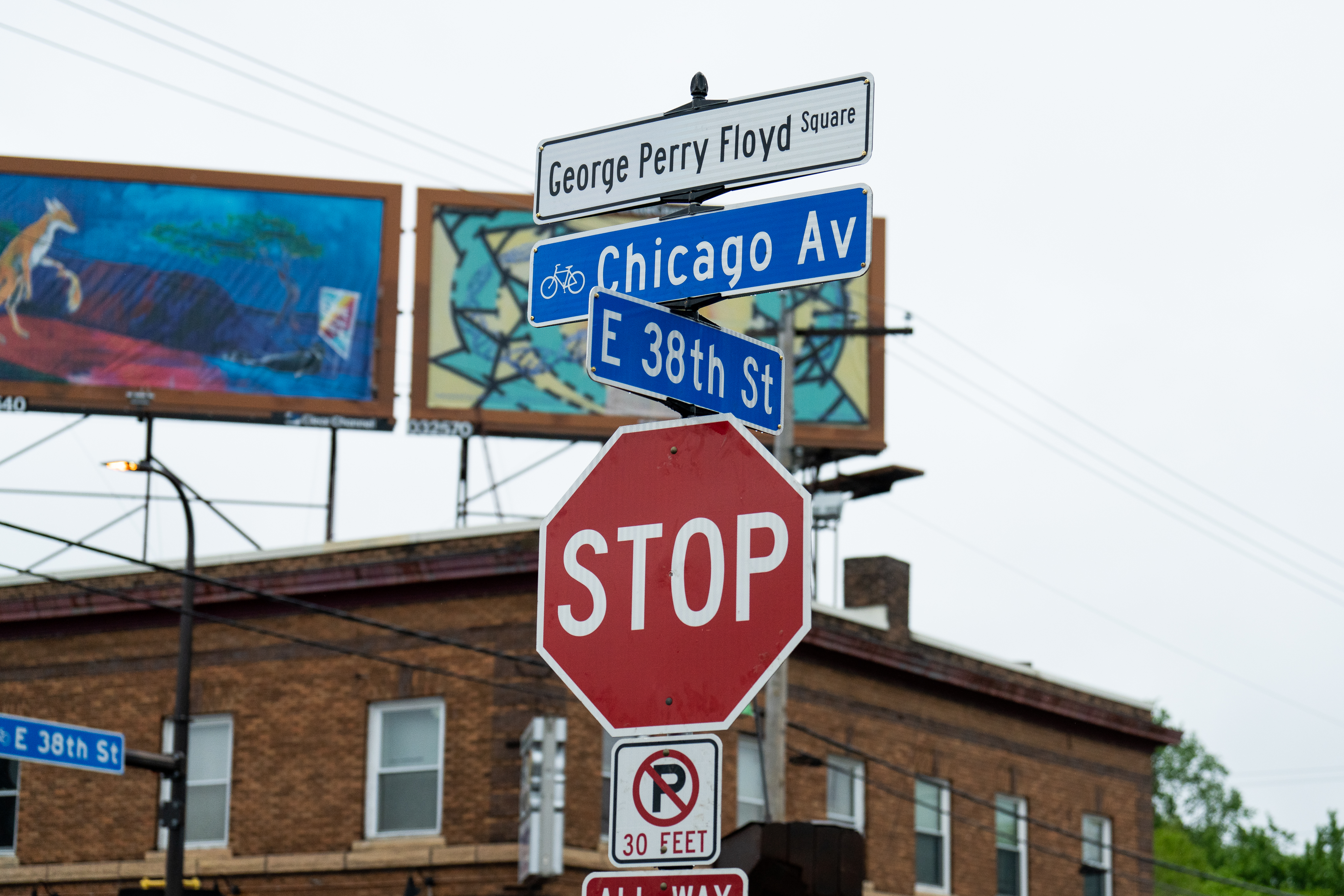
George Perry Floyd Square street sign in Minneapolis, Minnesota

George Floyd Square, officially designated as George Perry Floyd Square, in Minneapolis, Minnesota, is the commemorative name of the intersection at East 38th Street and Chicago Avenue where Floyd was murdered.

== U.S. laws ==
Several bills were introduced in the United States Congress following Floyd's murder:

- BREATHE Act
- George Floyd Justice in Policing Act
  - George Floyd Law Enforcement Trust and Integrity Act, a bill subtitle

== See also ==
- Black Lives Matter art
- List of Black Lives Matter street murals
- List of monuments and memorials removed during the George Floyd protests
- List of name changes due to the George Floyd protests
- List of changes made due to the George Floyd protests
- Reactions to the murder of George Floyd
