= George Floyd (disambiguation) =

George Floyd was an African-American man who was murdered by a police officer.

George Floyd may also refer to:

- George Floyd (American football) (born 1960), American football player
- George Rogers Clark Floyd (1810–1895), American politician and businessman

== See also ==
- George Lloyd (disambiguation), a similar name of identical etymology
