= George Floyd and Anti-Racist Street Art database =

Virtual art library

The George Floyd and Anti-Racist Street Art database functions as a free virtual art library. It was launched on June 5, 2020, by Dr. Todd Lawrence and Dr. Heather Shirey, professors at the University of St. Thomas in Minneapolis, Minnesota.

The project began with Dr. Shirey seeing graffiti that read "mama" on the side of a building in Minneapolis and has grown into a collection of more than 2,000 images of street art from around the world, including Syria. A prominent mural from the Black Lives Matter art in Portland, Oregon, by indigenous artist Xochilt Ruvalcaba, also served as inspiration. The artwork expresses rage, pain, mourning, and trauma.

The collection aims to be deeply moving; each piece is unique to the community where it was created. The works memorialize victims of police brutality and are intended to inspire conversation about police accountability. Each artwork is identified with the artist, the story behind its creation, and where it is located. In addition to collecting snapshots, the archive documents the changing artwork's evolution. Updated pictures of art at different points in time capture a piece's transient nature.

The collection is intended to preserve the artwork for future generations. "This database will serve as a resource to show people that there was this powerful movement and an articulation of anti-racist messages and art that came out of this movement," Dr. Todd Lawrence, one of the project creators, says. "People can try to paint over and wash it off, but we hope that because of our database, it can't be washed over completely."

Most images were collected and submitted to the project by crowdsourcing - people on the street uploading and emailing their photos. "The smallest tag or a beautiful mural... we want every picture of every piece of art," said Dr. Todd Lawrence.

== Urban Art Mapping ==
The George Floyd and Anti-Racist Street Art Archive is the work of Urban Art Mapping, a multiracial and multi-generational team of researchers based at the University of St.Thomas in Minneapolis, Minnesota. The project launched the COVID-19 Street Art database (March 16, 2020) and the George Floyd and Anti-Racist Street Art database (June 5, 2020).

Art historian Dr. Heather Shirey, one of the three faculty directors of the team, had the idea to map COVID-19 pandemic-related street art for future education and research, and launched the database, which includes images from around the world, and became a model for the George Floyd and Antiracist Street Art database.

== See also ==
- List of Black Lives Matter street murals
- Memorials to George Floyd
