= George Floyd mural (Portland, Oregon) =

2020 mural

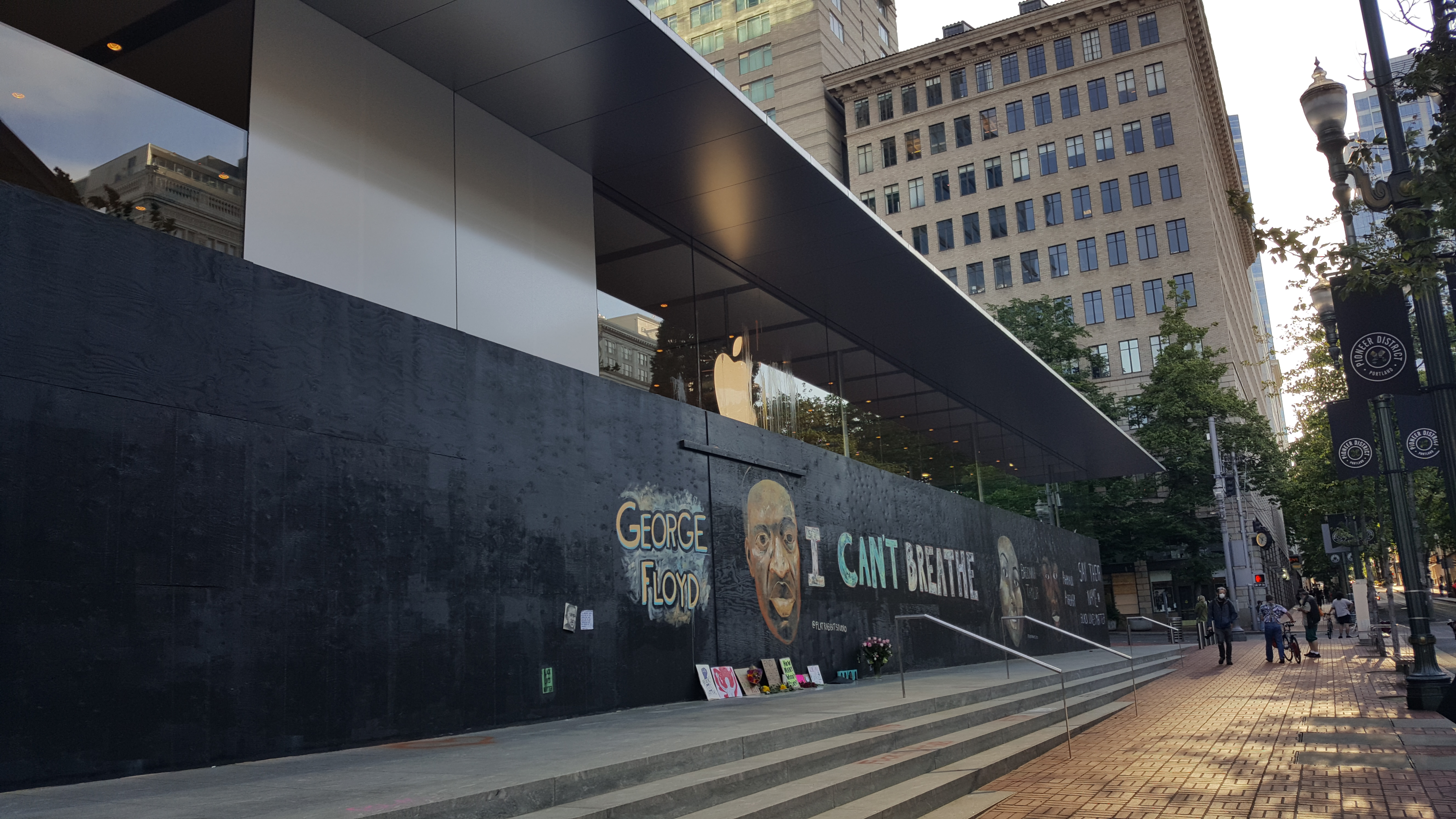
- Artist: Emma Berger
- Year: 2020
- Location: Portland, Oregon, United States; 45.5179°N 122.6775°W

A mural of George Floyd was painted by Emma Berger outside Portland, Oregon's Apple Pioneer Place, on June 1, 2020, a week following his murder, against the background of the ongoing protests against police brutality. She expanded the mural to show Ahmaud Arbery and Breonna Taylor and phrases associated with the Black Lives Matter movement. The work was vandalized in August, and repaired by the artist. It was covered by Apple Inc. in December for preservation, then removed in January 2021 to be donated to Don't Shoot PDX.

== Description and history ==
Emma Berger painted a mural of George Floyd outside Apple Pioneer Place in downtown Portland, on June 1, 2020. She completed the mural, which depicted Floyd and the phrase "I can't breathe", in approximately two hours and without seeking permission. Berger later added the faces of Ahmaud Arbery and Breonna Taylor, as well as the phrases "black lives matter" and "say their names". The image of Floyd is 8-foot (2.4 m) tall. Berger invited other artists to contribute to the mural; more faces, names, and background imagery were added on June 4. More artworks were added to the surrounding area.

The mural was vandalized in August 2020; the text "It's okay to be white" was written in spray-paint. Berger returned to repair the artwork. In December 2020, Apple covered the mural for preservation. The work was removed in January 2021, and donated to Don't Shoot PDX.

== Reception ==
The memorial was expanded by community members, who wrote poems using chalk and added candles. People also left flowers, pictures, and signs. According to KOIN's Ken Boddie, the work "became a national symbol".

Apple described the mural as "a monumental art piece honoring the ongoing fight for justice" and said in a statement: "Apple stands in support of the artists and all who are fighting for social and racial justice. We are honored to have hosted the murals and are very happy to entrust the artwork to Don't Shoot Portland in support of their advocacy for social change." Don't Shoot PDX said the paintings "reflect the responses of so many that were witnesses to last summer's uprisings, answering the joint call to action against institutionalized violence and white nationalism".

== See also ==
- 2020 in art
- George Floyd mural (Palm Springs, California)
- Memorials to George Floyd
