= Mother's Bistro =

Restaurant in Portland, Oregon, U.S.

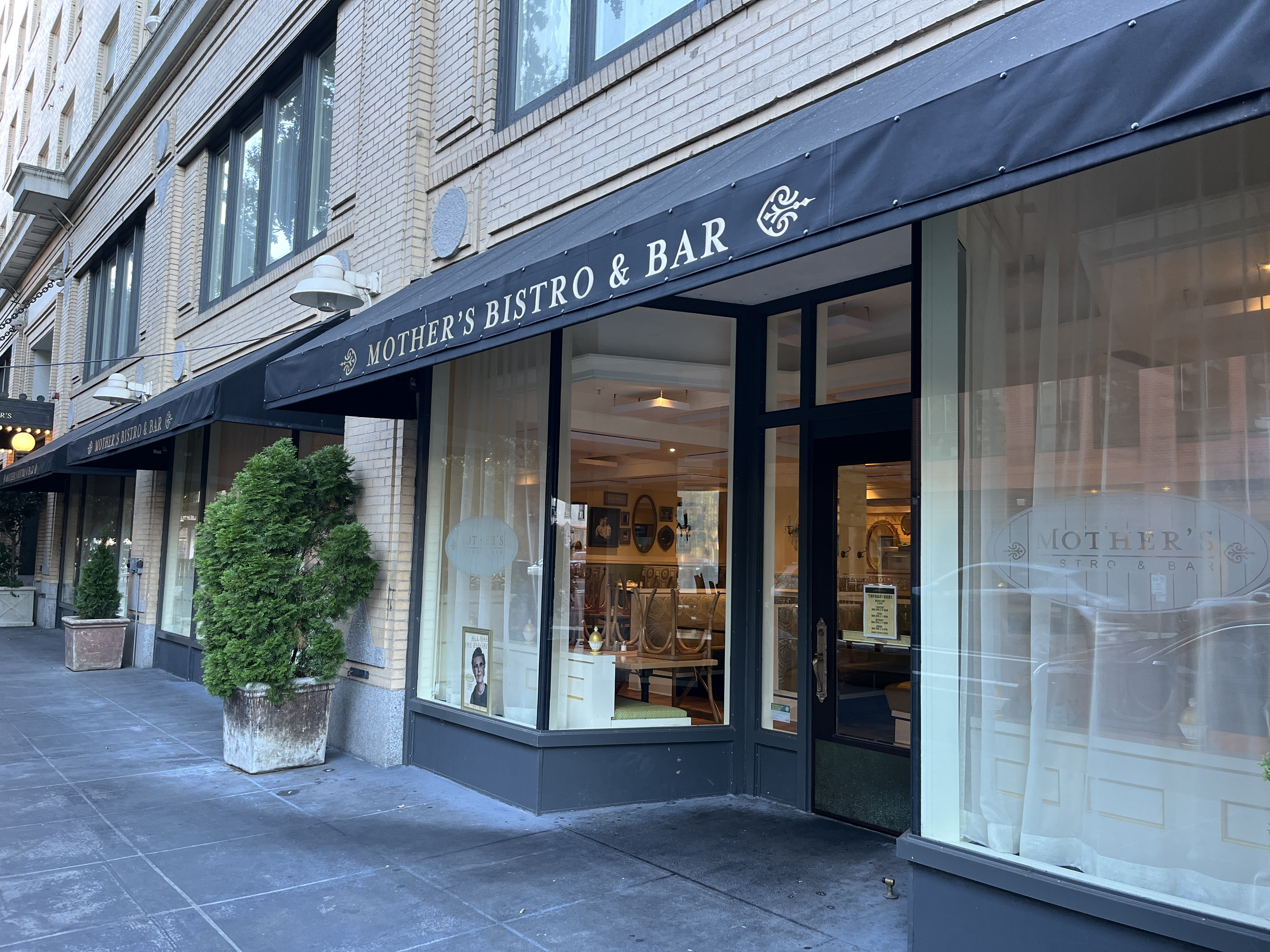
- The restaurant's exterior, 2022
- Interactive map of Mother's Bistro

Restaurant information
- Established: 2000
- Owner: Lisa Schroeder
- Head chef: Lisa Schroeder
- Location: 121 SW 3rd Ave., Portland, Multnomah, Oregon, 97204, United States
- Coordinates: 45°31′20″N 122°40′25″W
- Website: mothersbistro.com

Mother's Bistro and Bar is a restaurant in Portland, Oregon, United States.

== Description and history ==
Lisa Schroeder is the owner and executive chef. She opened Mother's in 2000. Schroeder announced plans to relocate the business in mid 2018. Mother's relocated from 212 SW Harvey Milk Street (formerly 212 SW Stark Street) to 121 SW Third Avenue, inside the Multnomah Hotel, in January 2019.

The restaurant participated in Portland's Dumpling Week in 2026.

== Reception ==
Mother's tied for first place in the "best old hometown restaurant" category Willamette Week's 2002 reader's poll. The restaurant ranked number one in the "Best Omelet" category, and Schroeder was named "Best Chef", in the same poll in 2016. Mother's also ranked third place in The Oregonian's "best brunch" poll in 2016. It ranked fifth in the same poll in 2025. Katherine Chew Hamilton and Brooke Jackson-Glidden included Mother's in Eater Portland's 2025 list of the city's best restaurants and food cart pods for large groups.
