= Black Lives Matter street mural (Capitol Hill, Seattle) =

Mural in Seattle, Washington, U.S.

- Artist: Vivid Matter Collective
- Completion date: June 13, 2020
- Subject: Black Lives Matter
- Dimensions: 6.1 m × 76 m (20 ft × 250 ft)
- Location: Seattle, Washington, U.S.; 47.6153°N 122.3189°W
- Website: https://vividmattercollective.studio/

A "Black Lives Matter" street mural was painted in Capitol Hill, Seattle, in the U.S. state of Washington in June 2020. Many of the artists who originally painted it formed the Vivid Matter Collective to steward the mural. Annually repainted by the collective and maintained by the Seattle Department of Transportation, the artwork has survived longer than many Black Lives Matter street murals across the United States.

== Description ==
The text "BLACK LIVES MATTER" was first painted in large letters on Pine Street between 10th and 11th avenues, during the Capitol Hill Occupied Protest (CHOP). Artists blocked it out in large white letters before filling in each letter with a different colorful mural. The monument is 250 feet long and 20 feet tall. Each letter is capitalized.

== History ==
The first street mural for Black Lives Matter was painted in Washington, D.C., with Charlotte also painting one. Charlotte's mural expanded on the original by painting murals in each letter.

=== Creation ===
Black Lives Matter protests occurred throughout June 2020 in Capitol Hill, Seattle. When the Seattle Police Department abandoned the East Precinct building there on June 8, protestors occupied the six-block area nearby. This eventually became the CHOP. After seeing the Charlotte Black Lives Matter mural, a Seattle mural painter connected with some of the Charlotte artists to receive the dimensions for their letters. The painter then calculated how large the mural would be if placed on the street near SPD's East Precinct building, and blocked out the letters with a friend.

On the morning of June 10, 2020, Takiyah Ward and Joey Nix recruited artists with the text: "Yo. We are looking for Black artists to add their style to the Seattle Black Lives Matter street mural...We want you, you down?” As they started painting, other artists joined in from the street. 16 artists completed the mural over the next three days, with Japhy White plotting the mural out in white paint, and the others each choosing a letter to fill. The artists funded all the supplies with donations collected from protestors and others walking through the CHOP.

Ward later recalled that "Being an artist, I had to act from the biggest and strongest way that I could. And that’s why the mural happened." Speaking on Martin Luther King Jr., she believed he "would champion the movement and champion the message of people fighting and acting from where they are."

Artist Kimisha Turner, who painted the first "B", later described her experience:

When we got there, it was so interesting [because] it had been kind of wet and then all of a sudden it just got dry and sunny and so many people were out there. It was during the [2020] protests and everything, but it was so welcoming and magical. I only knew a handful of the artists, of course now, we’re almost like family. I had my son out there. Everybody was bringing us water, they were taking care of us. Wow, I’m actually really part of a huge moment when it comes to not only doing something with this strong statement, but being a part of the protests where we were being called terrorists and stuff by Donald Trump.

Many of the original 16 artists formed the Vivid Matter Collective after painting the mural in order to steward its preservation. The collective's mission is to "spread truth through art." Aramis O. Hammer, a member of the collective, said she was "honored to have been a part of a historic mural, but it is also a visual reminder of all the Black lives that have been lost. Overall, don’t memorialize the monument and miss the message."

=== Maintenance ===
The mural's base layer was a concrete binding agent, and the artists intended to seal the mural the day after completing it, but rainy weather cancelled their plans. Once CHOP ended and vehicle traffic returned to the street, the collective started speaking with the Seattle Department of Transportation (SDOT) about ways to maintain the mural more permanently. On July 5, 2020, some outside artists attempted to protect the mural by sealing it, but this damaged the paint and trapped dirt against the mural. As they worked, onlookers called the police, worried that the mural was being defaced. When the police and SDOT employees spoke with the artists, they let the artists continue sealing the work, and SDOT later apologized for not verifying the artist with the collective. Some of the original artists confronted the sealers and argued over the changes, but they let the sealers finish because they were close to done. SDOT also installed posts around the mural in July to prevent cars from driving over it, and installed a four-way stop sign at a nearby intersection to slow traffic in the area.

The collective then reached an agreement with Seattle's Office of Arts and Culture to make the mural permanent. The city said this was "an acknowledgement of the cultural significance of the site in the Black Lives Matter movement." Realizing the mural would continue to deteriorate, both from the sealant and imperfect binding to the road, the collective and SDOT agreed to remove and redo the mural on September 22, 2020. SDOT sanded off the original paint, grinding the street down in the shape of the letters to smooth the base, and pressure washed the site. The mural was then repainted with colorful, block letters, each contributed by a different artist from the Vivid Matter Collective like in the original work. SDOT paid the collective $50,000 to repaint the mural, coming to about $3,000 per artist.

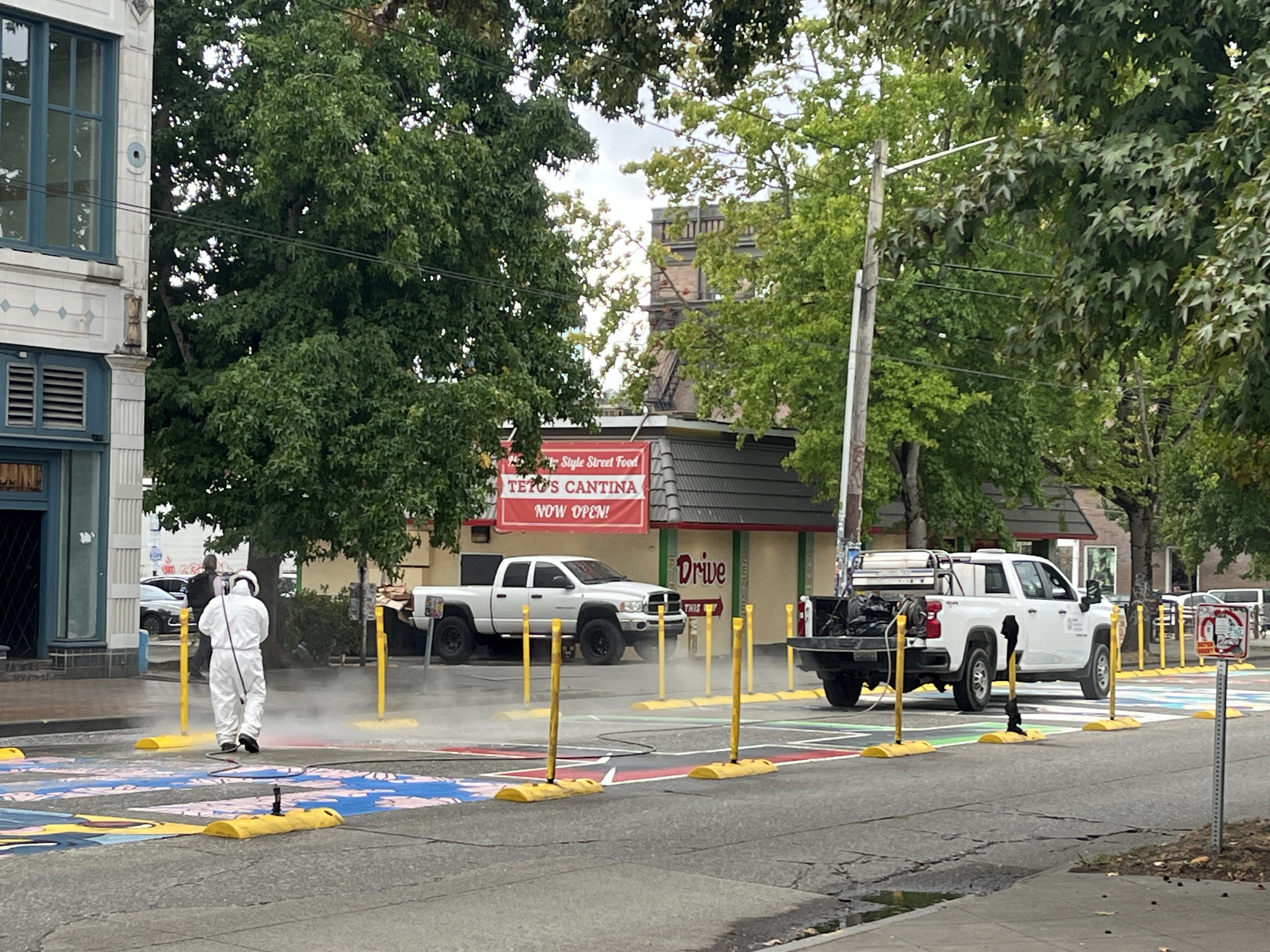
A worker cleans the mural.

The mural is repainted annually in a collaboration between SDOT and the Vivid Matter Collective. SDOT sands the old mural, shutting down the street and providing paint for the artists. To protect the pedestrian area, slower traffic lanes came to displace East Pine Street's curb parking. The work will require periodic maintenance over time.

In 2023, the repainting weekend expanded into a weekend of community art-making in honor of Elijah Lewis, a community organizer who had recently been killed in a road rage incident blocks from the mural.

A month after the 2025 mural repainting, someone vandalized the mural with white paint splatters and other markings. White paint splatters had been used a year before to vandalize nearby rainbow crosswalks on Pike and Pine. SDOT and the Vivid Matter Collective collaborated to clean and restore the artwork.

== Content ==
=== "BLACK" ===
Turner chose to paint the letter "B" in "BLACK", saying it was "because I have a Black boy and I want to begin it." Her son was with her when she painted the original mural and added his hand print to it. Turner's original design included arrows, which she said were "about progress, about moving forward."

Perry Porter painted the "L" in "BLACK", originally painting a woman who he said represented "Blackness" and "every black woman in [his] life." Her hair ran free and was surrounded by butterflies and a tentacle, as well as a shark representing Porter.

In the original 2020 mural, Angelina Villalobos, the artist for the letter "A" in "BLACK" painted the letter with her family. They added the ashes of the artist's mother into her favorite paint color, saying "this is something she would have been passionate about … we still wanted her to be a part of it because we knew this was something that would have aligned with her goals, and with how she thought the world should be."

Perri Rhoden, who painted the "C" in "BLACK", filled the 2020 repainting of the letter with blocks of color with black curvy lines running over them. She said "the color palette, for me, celebrates the diversity of the Black diaspora."

ARI Glass, the artist for the "K" in "BLACK," said the letter was one of his favorites and represented Black kingship and royalty. He described his 2020 repainted design as "the shining sun, we know how we shine ... how the melanin gleams.... Surrounding the sun is an ocean of blues, our sacred water element. The sun and water, essential to creation and essential for the original people."

=== "LIVES" ===
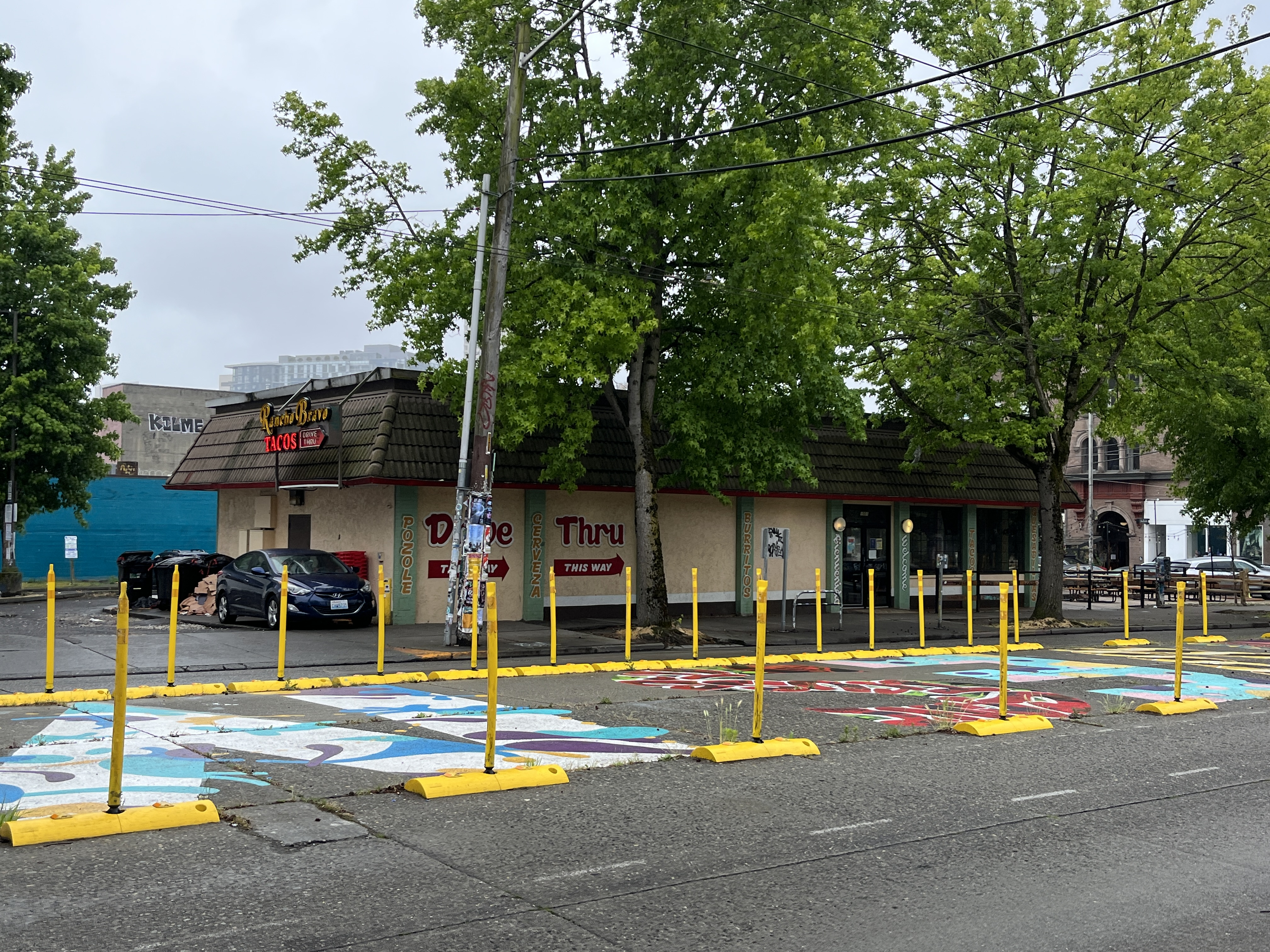
View of the "ES" in "LIVES" and "M" in "MATTER" from June 2023.

Teddy "Stat" Phillips originally painted the "I" in "LIVES", filling it with the phrase "For the Culture." To him, this meant "honoring your ancestors and the sacrifices that they made to allow you to be in a better position today and keeping your community at the forefront at all times." After the mural was repainted in 2020, Phillips did not repaint the letter. The rest of the collective divided the letter into 16 sections, forming the initials "VMC", by Brandon Thomas's design. Each artist then painted a section of the "I".

Hamer painted the "V" in "LIVES", filling it with golden chains in the 2020 repainting. She said they were reminders to "one: liberate myself and, two: live my life in a way that might inspire liberation in others."

Barry Johnson chose to paint the "E" in "LIVES" for his daughter Eva. He wanted love to be the message of his letter, saying it's what people needed and "I fought everything that we’re up against with love."

Sam Sneke painted the "S" in "LIVES," originally filling it with “Who protects us from you?” which is the title of a song about police abuse of power. In the 2020 repainting of the mural, he changed the phrase to the title “Can’t Truss It!” Sneke explained this as "stemming from a long list of police not being able to protect and serve communities where they do not reside."

=== "MATTER" ===
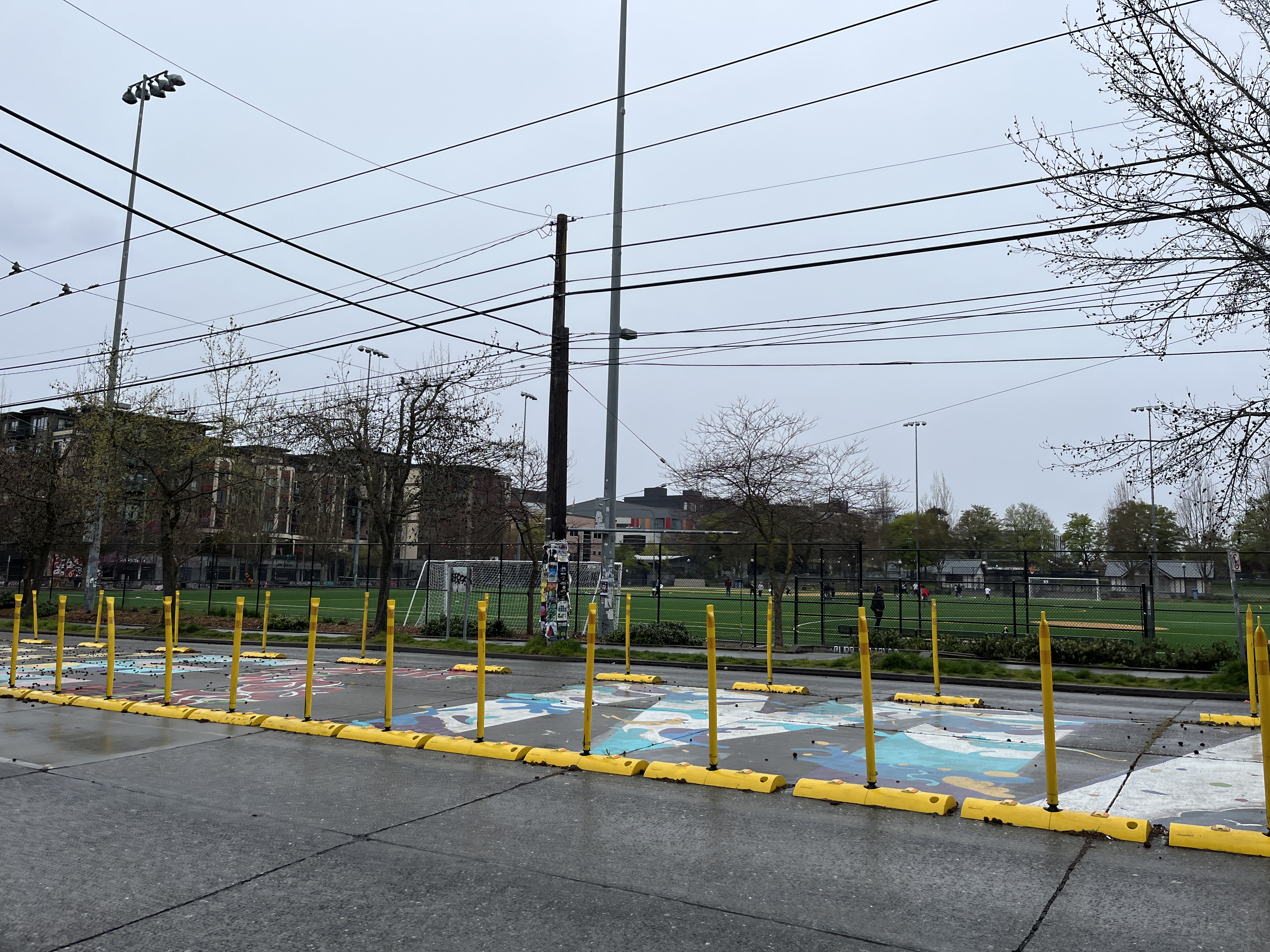
View of the mural's "M" in April 2024.

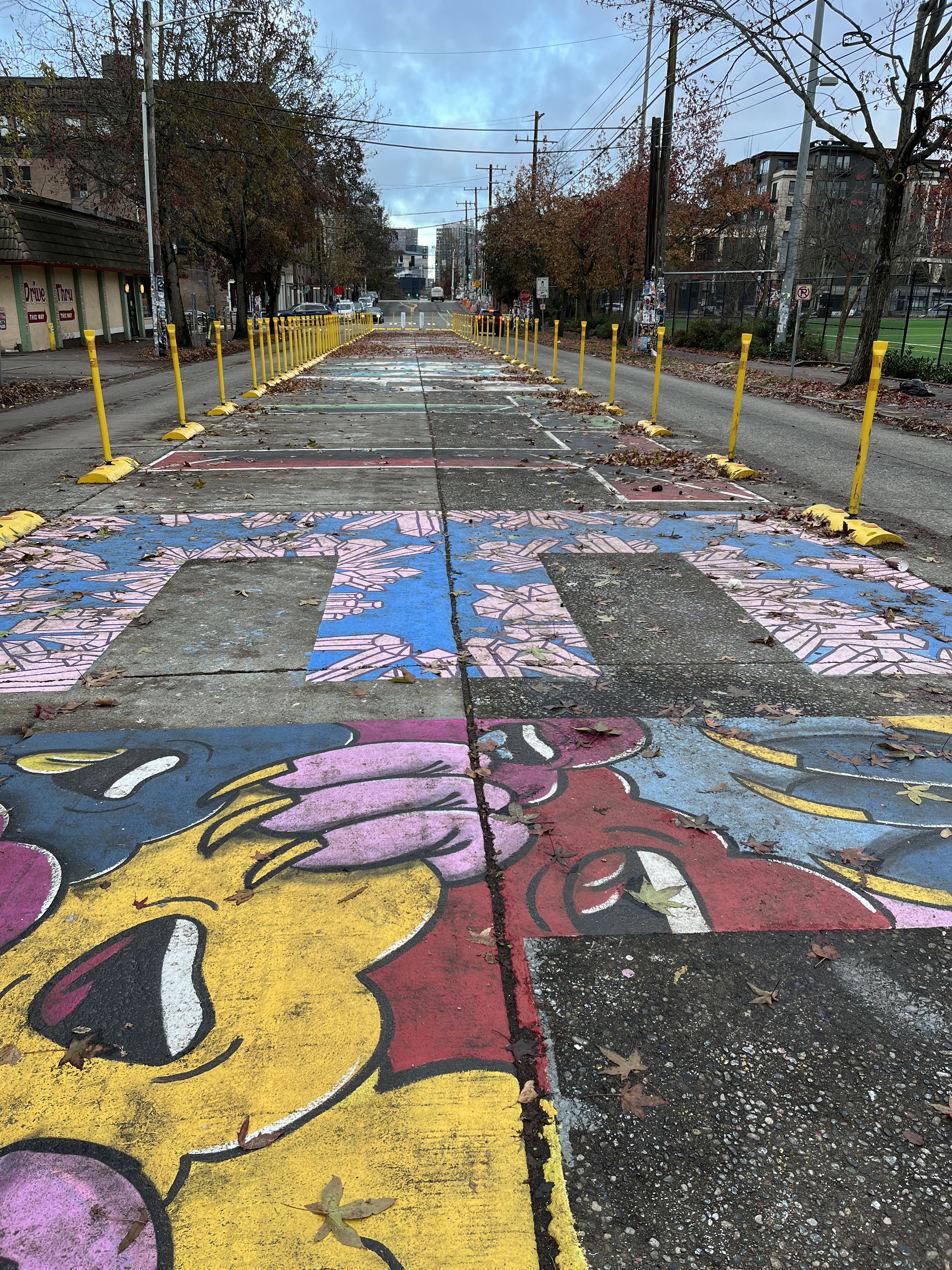
View from the end of the mural in December 2022.

Moses Sun painted the "M" in "MATTER", for his activist father also named Moses, as well as for "message" and "matters". The 2020 repainting of the letter has drops of purple, blue, and orange that spread beyond the letter. Sun says they signal "to break barriers through listening and collaborating with intention."

Brandon Thomas painted the "A" in "MATTER", putting an afro and rainbow pick in the repainted 2020 design. They explained that their hair had often been the target of microaggressions and larger issues: "being on the constant lookout for having your personal space invaded is as essential to the Black experience as the pride we have in our magical curls, locks, weaves, fades, fros, rows, you name it." The rainbow was to honor Capitol Hill and their own queerness: "Black Lives have and will always include the queerdos."

Ward painted each "T" in "MATTER", and her repainted 2020 design created a trompe-l'oiel effect to represent the depth of the conversation concerning the Black Lives Matter movement. She wanted to show "how ingrained it is into the very core, soil, concrete, infrastructure of this city, state and country. I think the events that have transpired in this country since last year only prove just how true and necessary the amplification of this message is."

Future Crystals painted the "E" in "MATTER", filling it with crystals in the 2020 repaint. They explained that each stone looked different and represented "many", but "when you step back, though, you get perspective and realize that it all just looks the same…. We are more similar than different." After the 2020 repainting, the "E" in "MATTER" featured representations of graffiti seen around the city, and its artist was criticized for including the anti-police slogan ACAB, apparently without notifying other artists. The mayor's office said the collective would ask the artist to remove the slogan. An organizer of Capitol Hill Pride expressed anger that the artist was being censored: "it’s literally how we feel about SPD. They may not like the words and things like that, but again, please respect artists’ rights and the community’s rights."

== Legacy ==
In March 2023, Amanda Ong of the South Seattle Emerald said the community gardens and the mural "are all that remain" of the Capitol Hill Occupied Protest. In June, Melissa Santos of Axios noted that Seattle's two Black Lives Matter murals have been preserved better than others across the United States. She wrote, "While some Black Lives Matter murals painted after the 2020 murder of George Floyd are getting paved over or worn away by traffic, Seattle has taken steps to restore its mural and make it permanent." Jasmine Mahmoud of Black Arts Legacies called the mural "an enduring Seattle memorial" in mid-2023.

== See also ==
- 2020 in art
