= Puget Sound John Brown Gun Club =

Gun club in the Puget Sound region

- Named after: John Brown
- Formation: May 9, 2017; 9 years ago
- Type: Anti-fascist armed leftist group
- Website: Official website

The Puget Sound John Brown Gun Club (PSJBGC) is a far-left gun club located in the Puget Sound area, formerly affiliated with Redneck Revolt. (Note: The club's website states "PSJBGC is an independent JBGC" and states it left Redneck Revolt Network in 2019.) During the George Floyd protests in June 2020, the group attended the Capitol Hill Autonomous Zone in Seattle.

The club calls itself an "anti-fascist, anti-racist, pro-worker community defense organization". The Guardian has called it an "anti-fascist armed leftist group" that "provide[s] security against rightwing aggression". The club has counter-protested Patriot Prayer marches in Seattle.
