= Ari Glass =

American painter, designer and musician (born 1989)

- Born: Ari Glass; Seattle, Washington (state), United States
- Occupation(s): Painter, Designer, Musician
- Years active: 2015–present

Ari Glass (born 1989) is an American painter, designer and musician.

== Biography ==
Glass grew up in the Rainier Valley, Seattle. Glass attended art classes at Franklin High School and briefly studied graphic design at Seattle Central College, but otherwise has no formal artistic training.

== Career ==
Glass habitually uses gold paint in his works, which are often described as being inspired by fictional concepts of royalty (kings, queens and kingdoms). As well as working in the visual arts, he has also created a music EP, designed a clothing line (called Reverie) and was involved with the Graffiti Village Tour.

In 2015, he received a GAP funding for his debut solo exhibition: "The Sun is Made of Gold". It was at Gallery 2312 in Belltown, Seattle and focused on migration stories via paintings and video. As a result of the success of this debut, he was invited to exhibit his work at the Paramount Theatre.

In 2016, he had a show in Out of Sight on Kings Street and was featured at The Soufend Art Show. In September 2016, he was a panellist for the Grant LAB experiment. In October 2016, Glass was featured at the 30th birthday of Artist Trust.

His works have been featured in projects that focus on the contributions of black artists, organized by Seattle Theatre Group (STG). Together with Aramis Hamer, Glass was part of STG project at The Paramount Theatre that aims to redefine historic cultural space in the form of an art gallery for local visual artists.

Two of his Othello, Seattle murals are on businesses across the street from each other, at a Safeway and the Odessa Brown Children's Clinic. His child went to the old clinic before it expanded in 2022. Glass's clinic mural is inside the building, taking multiple levels along a stairway. It contains animals and an "MLK" sign.

== Collaborations ==
Ari frequently collaborates with other artists from his area, as well as musicians, actors etc. These include:

- Zia Mohajerjasbi, in his movie Hagereseb
- Nimbus Vin
- Curry NA Hurry

In 2017, Ari Glass has shared his skills as an instructor to guide painters of all skill levels in crafting their art. He took a part of the Paint & Smoothies event in Seattle, which set its goal on bringing creativity to parks across the South End of the city, encouraging the community to embrace their unique identity and actualize their power for creating positive change. The event was part of Arts in Parks project, a partnership between Seattle Parks and Recreation and the city's Office of Arts & Culture.

His original work has been installed as a permanent art in the North Entrance of the Pacific Tower in Seattle and was created specifically to celebrate community and the diverse cultures that reside around the Tower. He was one of the 10 artists included in the 2017 installment of City Arts' annual Future List.

Glass painted the "K" in the Black Lives Matter mural in Capitol Hill, Seattle. He said that his piece "represents the ‘King’ or royal aspect that Black people embody, our kings and queens. My design is the shining sun, we know how we shine ... how the melanin gleams.... Surrounding the sun is an ocean of blues, our sacred water element. The sun and water, essential to creation and essential for the original people."
