= Capitol Hill Occupied Protest =

2020 self-declared autonomous zone in Seattle, US

Capitol Hill
- Occupation protest and self-declared autonomous zone
- Capitol Hill Occupied Protest
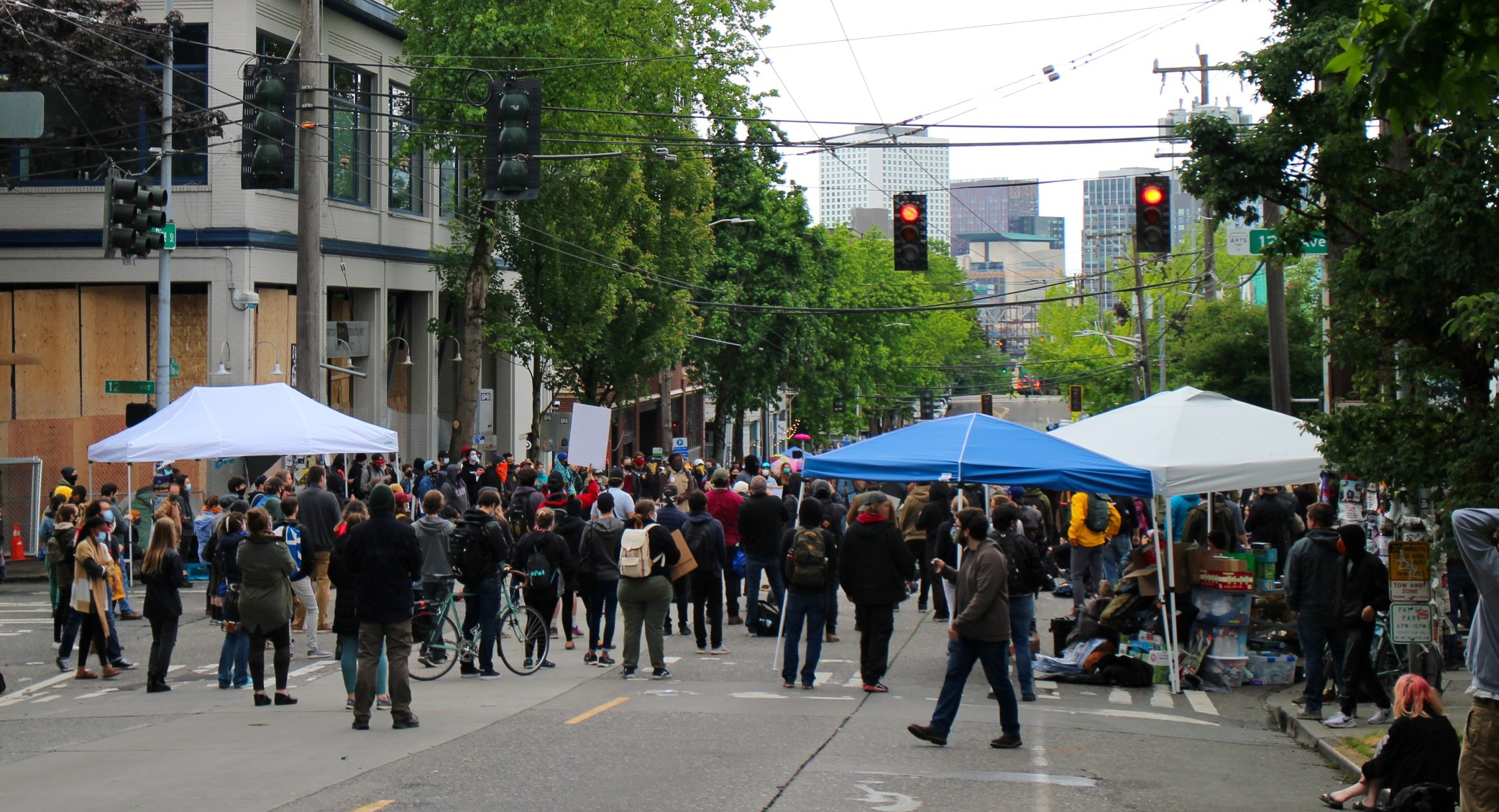
- CHOP on June 9, 2020
- Nickname: CHOP or CHAZ
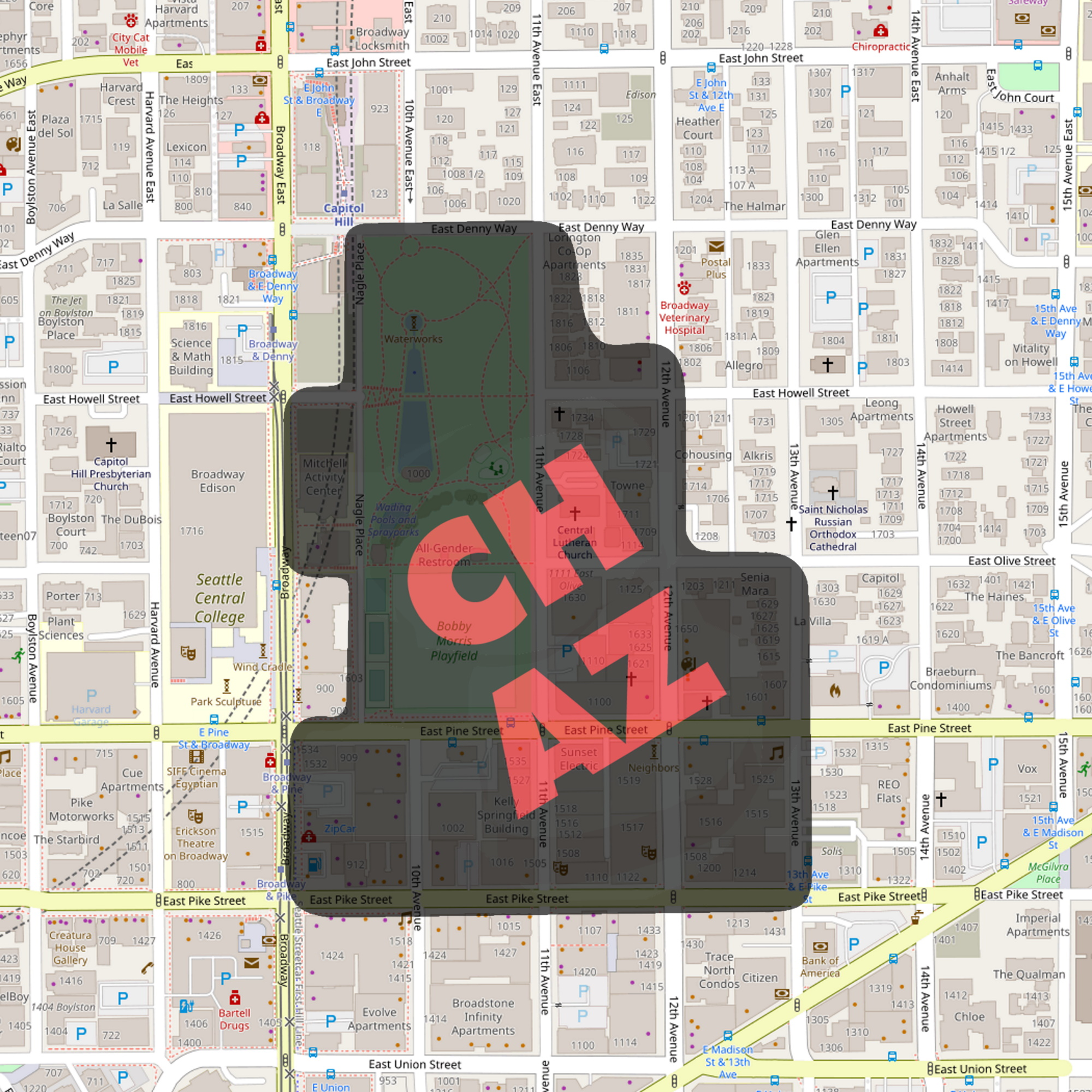
- Area occupied by CHOP

- The zone's location, in Seattle's Capitol Hill neighborhood
- Coordinates: 47.616°N 122.319°W
- Designation: Self-declared autonomous zone
- Established: June 8, 2020
- Disbanded: July 1, 2020

Government
  - Type: Anarchist protest occupation zone operated by consensus decision-making with daily meetings of protesters
  - Leader: Raz Simone (alleged, denied)

The Capitol Hill Occupied Protest (CHOP), also known as the Capitol Hill Organized Protest, originally known as Free Capitol Hill and later as the Capitol Hill Autonomous Zone (CHAZ), was an occupation protest and self-declared autonomous zone in the Capitol Hill neighborhood of Seattle, Washington. The zone, originally covering two intersections at the corners of Cal Anderson Park and the roads leading up to them, was established on June 8, 2020 by people protesting the May 2020 murder of George Floyd by a police officer in Minneapolis, Minnesota. The zone was cleared of occupants by police on July 1, 2020.

The formation of the zone was preceded by tense interactions between protesters and police in riot gear beginning on June 1, 2020. On June 1, thousands of Seattle residents were attending a permitted rally event at Westlake Mall in Downtown Seattle, one mile west of Seattle's east precinct in the Capitol Hill neighborhood. Police lined the northeast side of the rally and fired tear gas into the crowd. The event became chaotic and people began moving east toward Capitol Hill, where they eventually congregated, and protests continued each night. Police used tear gas, flash-bangs, and pepper spray in the densely populated residential neighborhood. The situation escalated on June 7 after the brother of a police officer drove his vehicle toward a crowd of protestors at 11th Avenue and Pine Street near the East Precinct police station, shooting a protester who tried to stop him. The same day, the Seattle Police Department (SPD) reported that protesters were throwing rocks, bottles, and fireworks, and shining green lasers into officers' eyes. The next day, the SPD vacated and boarded up its East Precinct building in an effort to deescalate the situation. After the SPD vacated the East Precinct station, protesters moved into the Capitol Hill area. They repositioned street barricades in a one-block radius around the station and declared the area "Free Capitol Hill". The protest area was later renamed the Capitol Hill Organized Protest (CHOP).

The zone was a self-organized space without official leadership. Police were not welcome within it. Protesters demanded that Seattle's police budget be decreased by 50%, that funding be shifted to community programs and services in historically black communities, and that CHOP protesters not be charged with crimes. Participants created a block-long "Black Lives Matter" mural, held free film screenings in the street, and performed live music. A "No Cop Co-op" was formed, with food, hand sanitizer and other supplies. Areas were set up for public speakers and to facilitate discourse.

The CHOP was a focus of national attention during its existence. On June 11, Seattle Mayor Jenny Durkan said the zone had a "block party" atmosphere; later, The New York Times contrasted Durkan's words with local businesspeople's accounts of harassment, vandalism, and looting. The CHOP's size decreased after shootings in or near it on June 20, 21, and 23. On June 28, Durkan met with protesters and told them that the city planned to remove most barricades and limit the zone's area. In the early morning of June 29, a fourth shooting left a black 16-year-old boy dead and a black 14-year-old boy critically injured. Calling the situation "dangerous and unacceptable", police chief Carmen Best told reporters: "Enough is enough. We need to be able to get back into the area." On July 1, after Durkan issued an executive order, Seattle police cleared the area of protesters and reclaimed the East Precinct station. Protests continued in Seattle and at the CHOP site over the following days and months.

== History ==
=== Background ===
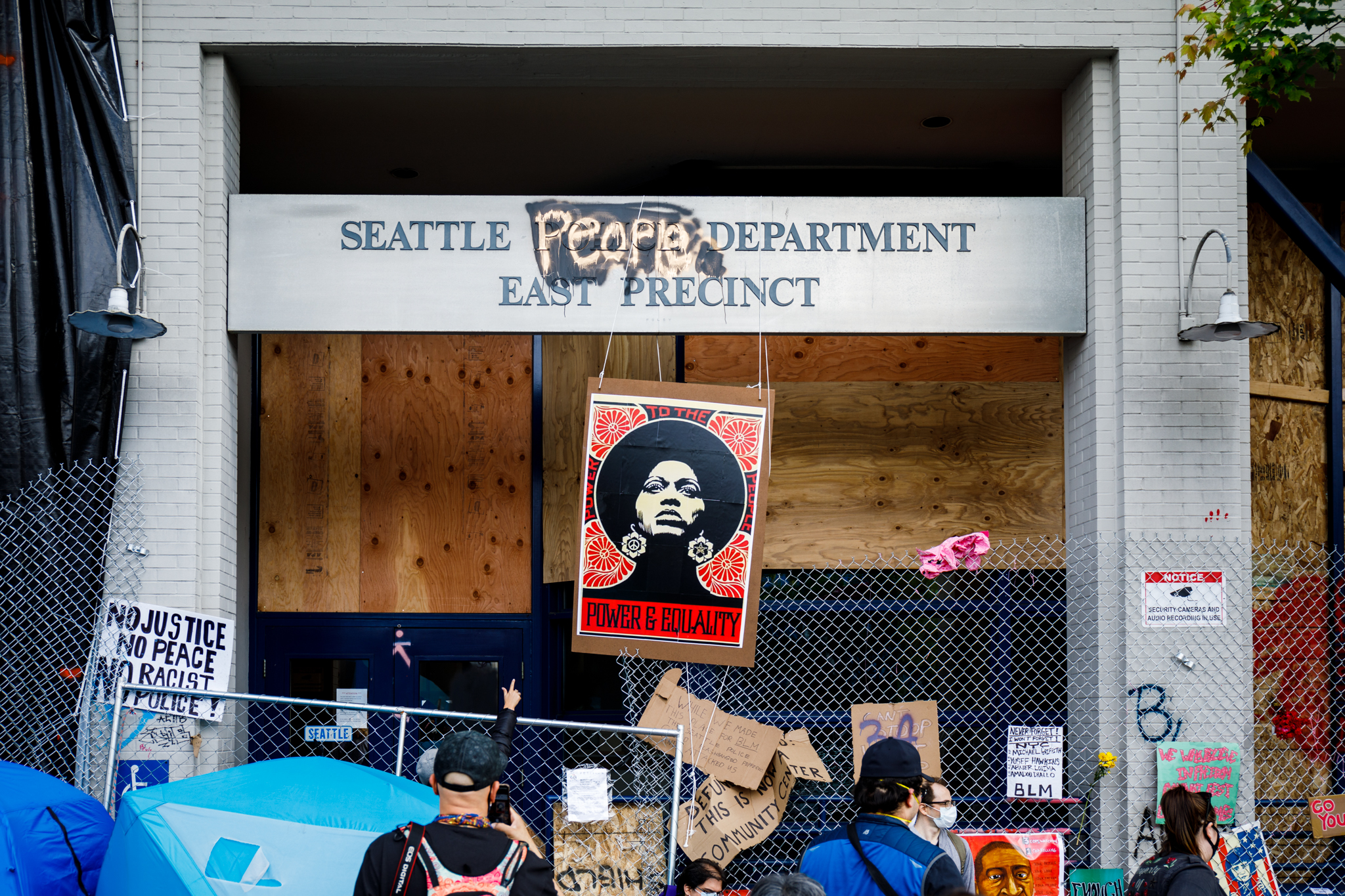
Sign of the SPD East Precinct, with "people" spray painted over the word "police" on June 13, 2020

Capitol Hill is a densely populated residential district on a steep hill just east of Seattle's downtown business district, known for its prominent LGBT and counterculture communities and its vibrant nightlife. The Seattle Police Department had been protested against in the past. In 1965, during the civil rights movement, after Robert L. Reese, an unarmed black man, was shot by an SPD officer, community leaders followed police in "freedom patrols" to observe and record their interactions with the Black community. Since 2012, the SPD had been under federal oversight after it had been found to use excessive force and biased policing.

Seattle had been the location of other mass protests, such as the 1999 WTO protests and Occupy Seattle. The city is home to several cultural institutions created by occupation protests, including the Northwest African American Museum, the Daybreak Star Cultural Center, and El Centro de la Raza.

Protests over the murder of George Floyd and police brutality began in Seattle on May 29, 2020. Street clashes occurred in greater Seattle for nine days, involving protesters, the Seattle Police Department, the Washington State Patrol, and the Washington National Guard.

=== Capitol Hill clashes (June 1–8) ===
The zone's formation was preceded by a week of tense interactions in the Capitol Hill neighborhood beginning on June 1, when protesters and police in riot gear faced off at a police barricade near the SPD's East Precinct building after a child was pepper sprayed and police refused to let paramedics treat the child. The SPD used dispersal tactics, including blast balls, flash-bangs, and pepper spray. On June 5, Mayor Jenny Durkan and SPD Chief Carmen Best announced a 30-day ban on the use of tear gas.

A group of public representatives (including four City Council members, a King County Council member, State Senator Joe Nguyen, and State Representative Nicole Macri) joined demonstrators on June 6 on the front lines in response to citizen requests, when officers again used flash-bangs and pepper spray to control the crowd.

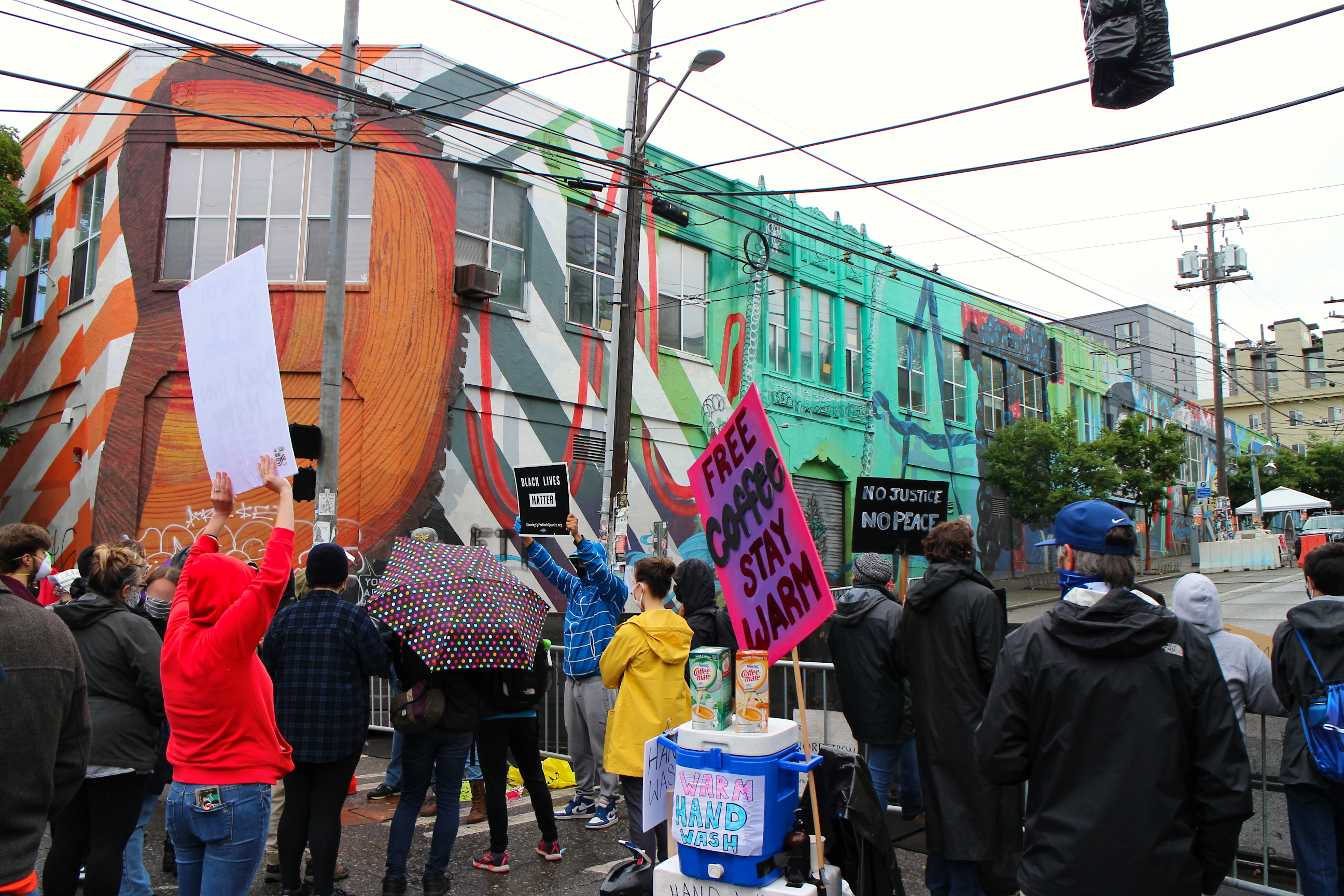
Protesters gathering at the SPD East Precinct's western barricade on June 7

On June 7, police installed sturdier barricades around the East Precinct and boarded up its windows. The situation intensified after 8 pm, when a demonstrator was shot while trying to slow down a vehicle speeding toward a crowd of 1,000 protesters on 11th Avenue and East Pine Street; the driver left the vehicle with a gun and walked toward the police line, where he was taken into custody without incident. It later became known that the shooter's brother worked at the East Precinct. After midnight on June 8, police reported that protesters were throwing bottles, rocks, and fireworks. The SPD resumed using tear gas (despite the mayor's ban), and used pepper spray and flash-bangs against protesters at 11th and Pine. Over 12,000 complaints were filed about police response to the demonstrations, and members of the Seattle City Council asked how many weapons had been thrown at police.

On June 8, Durkan's office told SPD leaders to remove the barricades around the East Precinct to allow protesters to march on the street outside. SPD reports stated that they opposed this decision and were worried about the destruction of the East Precinct, so they began to remove sensitive equipment from the building. Chief Best announced the barricade removal in a press release that afternoon, saying the East Precinct would not be abandoned and that the change was "an exercise in trust and de-escalation".

Later that day, SPD boarded up and unexpectedly vacated the East Precinct. It remained unclear days later who had decided to retreat from the East Precinct, since Best did not admit responsibility. Durkan later attributed the decision to withdraw to an unnamed SPD on-scene commander. Over a year later, KUOW reported that Assistant Chief Tom Mahaffey made the decision, and that he had done so without Best's or Durkan's knowledge. Mahaffey amended his account to say that Best had authorized the evacuation of staff from the East Precinct, but Best said she was not part of the decision. Seattle's Office of Police Accountability decided that in either case, the decision was reasonable but should have been communicated to the public earlier.

=== Formation and operation ===
On June 8, after the SPD had vacated the East Precinct station, protesters moved into the Capitol Hill area. They positioned street barricades in a one-block radius around the station, and declared the area "Free Capitol Hill".

Mayor Durkan called the zone an attempt to "de-escalate interactions between protesters and law enforcement", and Best said that her officers would look at approaches to "reduce our footprint" in the Capitol Hill neighborhood. City Council member Kshama Sawant spoke to occupants of Cal Anderson Park on June 8 and urged protesters to turn the precinct into a community center for restorative justice. Police were not welcome within the CHOP.

That night, in an attempt to split protesters away from CHOP, four SPD officers created a "ruse". They knew members of the public were monitoring police radio traffic, so they invented a Proud Boys march of 20–30 armed people who were ready for a fight and heading from downtown Seattle toward Capitol Hill. The police shared updates about the nonexistent march on public channels, which led some protesters to arm themselves in preparation for a clash. The ruse was part of a broader "misinformation effort" that the captain of the East Precinct approved with the stated goal to make protesters believe SPD "had more officers out there doing regular stuff".

On June 10, about 1,000 protesters marched into Seattle City Hall demanding Durkan's resignation.

Observers described early zone activity on June 11 as a hybrid of other movements, with an atmosphere that was "part protest, part commune"; a cross between "a sit-in, a protest and summer festival"; or a blend of "Occupy Wall Street and a college cooperative dorm." According to a June 16 Vox article, CHOP had evolved into "a center of peaceful protest, free political speech, co-ops, and community gardens" after protesters recovered from their initial confusion over the police decision to leave the precinct. In an interview given on June 11th, Mayor Durkan remarked that it was "more like a block party atmosphere" and commented "[w]e could have the summer of love."

On June 11, the SPD announced its desire to reenter the abandoned East Precinct building and said it still operated in the zone; according to Washington governor Jay Inslee, the zone was "un-permitted" but "largely peaceful". The next day, Best said: "Rapes, robberies and all sorts of violent acts have been occurring in the area and we have not been able to get to it." In the early morning of June 12, Isaiah Thomas Willoughby, a former Seattle resident, set a fire at the East Precinct building and walked away; community residents extinguished it before it spread beyond the building's external wall or to nearby tents. Later that day, Durkan visited the zone and told a New York Times reporter that she was unaware of any serious crime reported in the area. Most of the people Vox interviewed had participated in the protests but did not feel safe walking in the area at night, especially in late June. One Capitol Hill resident noted a difference in perspective between outsiders and residents: "I feel a lot of the current 'it's not safe' stuff comes from either people who aren't living in the neighborhood itself or from affluent new arrivals, or from business owners." Also on June 12, a federal judge temporarily banned SPD from using less-lethal crowd control weapons like tear gas, pepper spray, and foam-tipped projectiles on protesters, saying the department had used them "disproportionately and without provocation".

Some protesters lived in tents inside the zone. Urban camping was illegal in Seattle at the time but the law was seldom enforced.

On June 13, Black Lives Matter protesters negotiated with local officials about leaving the zone. The CHOP's size decreased four days later (when roadblocks were moved).

On June 15, armed members of the Proud Boys appeared in the zone at a Capitol Hill rally. That day, the Seattle City Council unanimously voted to ban SPD's use of chokeholds and certain crowd-control weapons, including tear gas, pepper spray, acoustic weapons, and kinetic impact projectiles. The bills were a response to widely publicized videos of SPD's use of crowd-control weapons against nonviolent protesters. The council had heard multiple complaints from Capitol Hill residents who had to leave their homes due to the spread of tear gas. The council also passed a bill blocking the use of mourning bands to cover officer badge numbers, extending a previous directive from Chief Best requiring officers to display their badge numbers.

On June 16, CHOP representatives and the city reached an agreement to "rezone" the occupied area to allow better street access for businesses and local services. The next day, KING-TV reported that some residents were uneasy with the occupation near their homes: "What you want from a home is a stress-free environment. You want to be able to sleep well, you want to feel comfortable, and we just don't feel comfortable right now." The station reported receiving anonymous emails from other residents expressing "real concerns". On June 18, black protesters reportedly expressed unease about the zone and its use of Black Lives Matter slogans. According to NPR, "Black activists say there must be follow-through to make sure their communities remain the priority in a majority-white protest movement whose camp has taken on the feel of a neighborhood block party that's periodically interrupted by chants of 'Black Lives Matter!'"

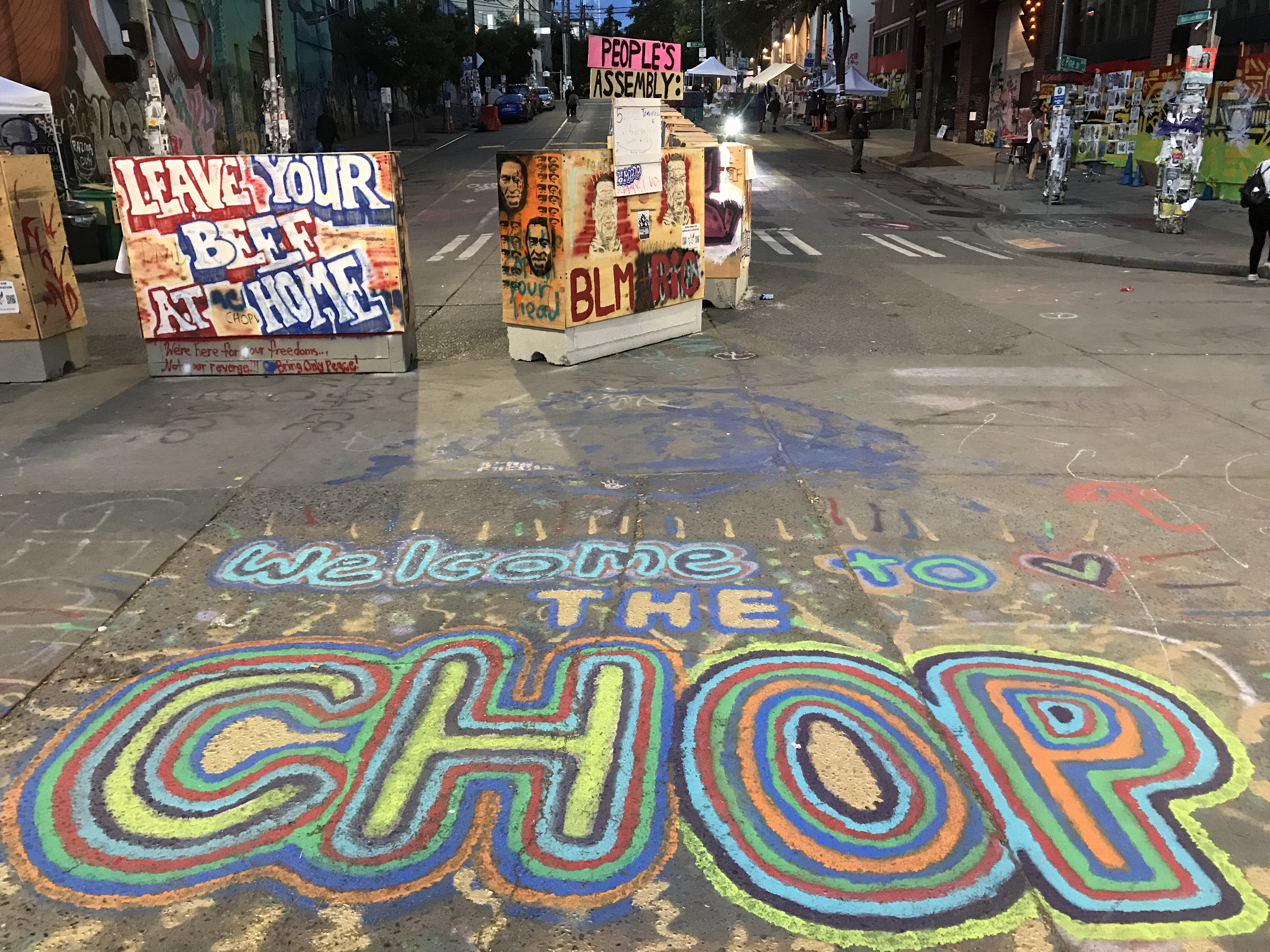
Artwork at the Pine Street and 11th Avenue entrance on June 24. Prior to June 13, it had read "CHAZ".

The CHOP continued to shrink after several shootings in or near the zone on June 20, 21, and 23. The Star Tribune reported on June 22 that at night, the atmosphere within the zone became charged as demonstrators marched and armed volunteer guards kept watch. On June 22, Durkan and Best said in a press conference that police would reoccupy the East Precinct "peacefully and in the near future"; no specific timeline was given. CNN quoted "de facto CHOP leader" hip-hop artist Raz Simone two days later as saying that "a lot of people are going to leave; a lot of people already left" the zone. That day, Durkan proposed a police hiring freeze and a $20 million cut to the SPD budget (about a 5% reduction for the rest of 2020) to compensate for a revenue shortfall and unforeseen expenses due to the pandemic. During a public-comment period, community members said that the budget cut should be larger and SPD funds should be redirected to housing and healthcare.

Twelve businesses, residents, and property owners filed a class-action lawsuit in federal court against the city, which they said had deprived them of due process by permitting the zone. Saying that they did not want "to undermine CHOP participants' message or present a counter-message", the plaintiffs alleged that their legal rights were "overrun" by the city's "unprecedented decision to abandon and close off an entire city neighborhood" and isolate them from city services. They sought compensation for property damage and lost business and property rights, and restoration of full public access. Community Roots Housing, a public development authority that owns 13 properties near the zone, called for its shutdown on June 30: "These residents have become victims of an occupation better characterized today by its violence, chaos and killings than anything else ... Forcing us to choose between anarchy and police brutality is a false dichotomy. Compassion and law-enforcement should not be mutually exclusive."

On June 28, Durkan met with protesters and told them that the city planned to remove most barricades and limit the activist area to the East Precinct building and the street in front of it. That day, CHOP organizers expressed their intention to refocus on the area near the police station and away from the sprawling encampment at Cal Anderson Park after it became a political liability and they struggled to maintain security. In the early morning of June 29, a fourth shooting left a 16-year-old boy dead and a 14-year-old boy in critical condition with gunshot wounds. Calling the situation "dangerous and unacceptable", Best told reporters: "Enough is enough. We need to be able to get back into the area."

=== Cessation ===
At 5:28 a.m. on July 1, Durkan issued an executive order that "gathering in this area [is] an unlawful assembly requiring immediate action from city agencies, including the Police Department." More than one hundred police officers, with help from the FBI, moved into the area and tweeted a warning that anyone remaining or returning would be subject to arrest. Forty-four people were arrested by the end of the day, and another 25 were arrested overnight. The SPD posted a YouTube video depicting violent incidents in the Capitol Hill area. Police maintained roadblocks in the area and restricted access to local residents, workers and business owners; some of the latter alleged that the police presence discouraged customers.

=== Aftermath ===
Street protests continued after the zone was cleared. Protests continued in Seattle and at the CHOP site over the following days and months. The SPD reported vandalism in the Capitol Hill area during the night of July 19; fireworks were thrown into the East Precinct, starting a small fire that was rapidly extinguished. Donnitta Sinclair Martin, the mother of Lorenzo Anderson, filed a wrongful death claim against the city that the police and fire department had failed to protect or provide medical assistance for her son and city decisions had created a dangerous environment.

A group of 150 people returned to the Capitol Hill neighborhood late at night on July 23 and vandalized several businesses, including a shop owned by a relative of a police officer who fatally shot Charleena Lyles, a pregnant black woman, at her home in 2017. On July 25, several thousand protesters gathered in the Capitol Hill neighborhood for demonstrations in solidarity with Portland, Oregon. Tensions had escalated in Portland in early July after the Trump administration deployed federal forces against the wishes of local officials, sparking controversy and regenerating the protests. The Department of Homeland Security deployed an undisclosed number of federal agents in Seattle on July 23 without notifying local officials, adding to resident unease. An initially peaceful march on the afternoon of July 25 by the Youth Liberation Front was designated a riot by the SPD after several businesses were destroyed, fires were started in five construction trailers near a future juvenile detention center, and several center employees' vehicles were vandalized. Forty-seven people were arrested, and 21 police officers were injured. According to Crosscut, many protesters had participated in the understanding that the march's central issues (police brutality and federal overreach) were connected.

The New York Times reported on August 7 that, weeks after the protests, several blocks remained boarded up and many business owners were afraid to speak out about their experiences. Carmen Best resigned as chief of police three days later, after the Seattle City Council voted to downsize the department by up to 100 out of its 1,400 officers. On August 24, after a night of protest against the police shooting of Jacob Blake in Kenosha, Wisconsin, Alaska resident Desmond David-Pitts helped set a fire against the East Precinct's sally-port door while others tried to bar the door so police could not escape. There was no significant damage, but cement barrier walls were soon erected (later replaced by a tall security fence) to prevent further access to the building. Public hearings about the fate of the zone's public art and community garden began in August, and were expected to continue for several months.

On December 16, an expected third "sweep" of the park was met with resistance by the community. People created makeshift barriers and thwarted SPD's attempts to enter the park. While a federal court considered a temporary restraining order preventing the city from raiding the park, protesters took advantage of the turnout to occupy a private building owned by a real estate developer across the street from the northern end of the park.

=== Investigations and lawsuits ===
50 protesters sued the city for SPD's use of crowd-control weapons on them throughout the summer of 2020. Many of the plaintiffs cited hearing loss, broken bones, concussions, bruises, and PTSD. One went into cardiac arrest after being hit in the chest by an exploding blast ball, and another lost part of a finger. Over 10,000 videos and over 100 witness interviews were used in the case. The city settled in January 2024, paying $10 million.

Several business owners sued the city in 2020 for damages relating to government conduct during the protests. In early 2021, two public records officers in Durkan's office complained about mishandled records requests to the Seattle Ethics and Elections Commission. State law required public officials like the mayor to keep official texts for at least two years, but many of Durkan's texts from summer 2020 were missing. The commission found that Durkan's legal counsel violated state laws by excluding her missing texts when responding to some records requests. The two whistleblowers later resigned and sued the city, claiming they had experienced retaliation, requests to perform illegal acts, and a hostile workplace. In 2023, the city settled their lawsuit for $2.3 million.

The mayor's office initially blamed the missing texts on technology issues, but later forensic investigations discovered some texts were manually deleted. A federal judge then found that the mayor, police chief, and other government officials had illegally deleted tens of thousands of text messages relating to government handling of CHOP. In 2022, the city settled a lawsuit with the Seattle Times for $200,000 over its handling of deleted texts and agreed to improve its record-keeping practices. In 2023, the city settled the lawsuit with businesses affected by CHOP, paying $3.65 million, including a penalty for the deleted texts.

Thousands of complaints were filed with the city of Seattle against SPD during the summer of 2020. The Office of Police Accountability (OPA) combined them into 145 investigations of individual employee conduct, while the Office of Inspector General (OIG) oversaw systemic issues. As of March 2024, the OPA had completed 133 investigations into employee conduct, with four resulting in officer suspensions without pay. Three complaints were filed against Chief Best. They were not investigated until Bruce Harrell replaced Durkan as mayor and forwarded them from the OPA to an outside investigator. OPA released the report in June 2023, finding that in some cases Best did not violate policy, but that it did not have sufficient evidence to decide in others. Best refused to be interviewed for the investigation, and because she had retired, the city could not take disciplinary action against her.

The OIG led four waves of reviews of SPD's conduct, examining its crowd-control policies, ways to rebuild community trust, and communications and actions during summer 2020. The third review harshly rebuked SPD, blaming its bad decisions and misleading communications for increasing the tensions and violence surrounding CHOP. The panel especially criticized the department's choice to withhold emergency services from CHOP and lie to the public. It made 34 recommendations, emphasizing that SPD must maintain public safety "despite criticism and anger from the community".

=== Policy and policing changes ===
CHOP protesters had demanded a 50% reduction of SPD's budget for 2020 and 2021. Seven of nine city council members supported the reduction in July 2020, but Durkan opposed it. After the city budget was adjusted due to the pandemic, the council cut $3 million of the $402 million SPD budget for 2020, and decreased 2021's SPD budget by 10%. In the next budget adjustment, $30 million was earmarked for causes related to the protesters' demands, and in 2021, civilian 911 dispatchers and parking officers were moved out of SPD. Parking officers were later returned to SPD because they lacked the authority to write tickets, and the SPD budget began to grow after 2022 in an effort to recruit more officers.

Restrictions on SPD's use of crowd-control weapons fluctuated due to city council and federal court rulings. After the city council banned SPD's use of several crowd-control weapons on June 15, 2020, a federal judge temporarily suspended the ordinance because it could conflict with federal oversight of SPD. Another federal judge extended a temporary ban through September 30, 2020, to block SPD from using chemical and projectile weapons against peaceful protesters. In August, the city agreed to avoid preemptively calling incidents "riots", since the designation eases the deployment of crowd-control weapons.

In December, a federal judge found SPD in contempt of court for its use of blast balls and pepper spray against peaceful protesters during the summer. In August 2021, the city council unanimously approved a modified ordinance restricting SPD's use of crowd-control weapons, but Durkan refused to sign it, saying she believed it would be overturned. This time, blast balls, acoustic weapons, directed energy weapons, water cannons, and ultrasonic cannons were banned, with tear gas and pepper spray restricted to settings where risk of immediate violence outweighed the risk of harm to bystanders.

On June 23, 2020, Jay Inslee announced a new Washington State task force to review policing practices and racial justice; the group would include some relatives of people killed by police officers. On June 24, the board of Seattle Public Schools voted to remove SPD officers from city schools, ending a program that had involved five officers. It limited officer presence to public events where officers would be unarmed.

== Territory ==
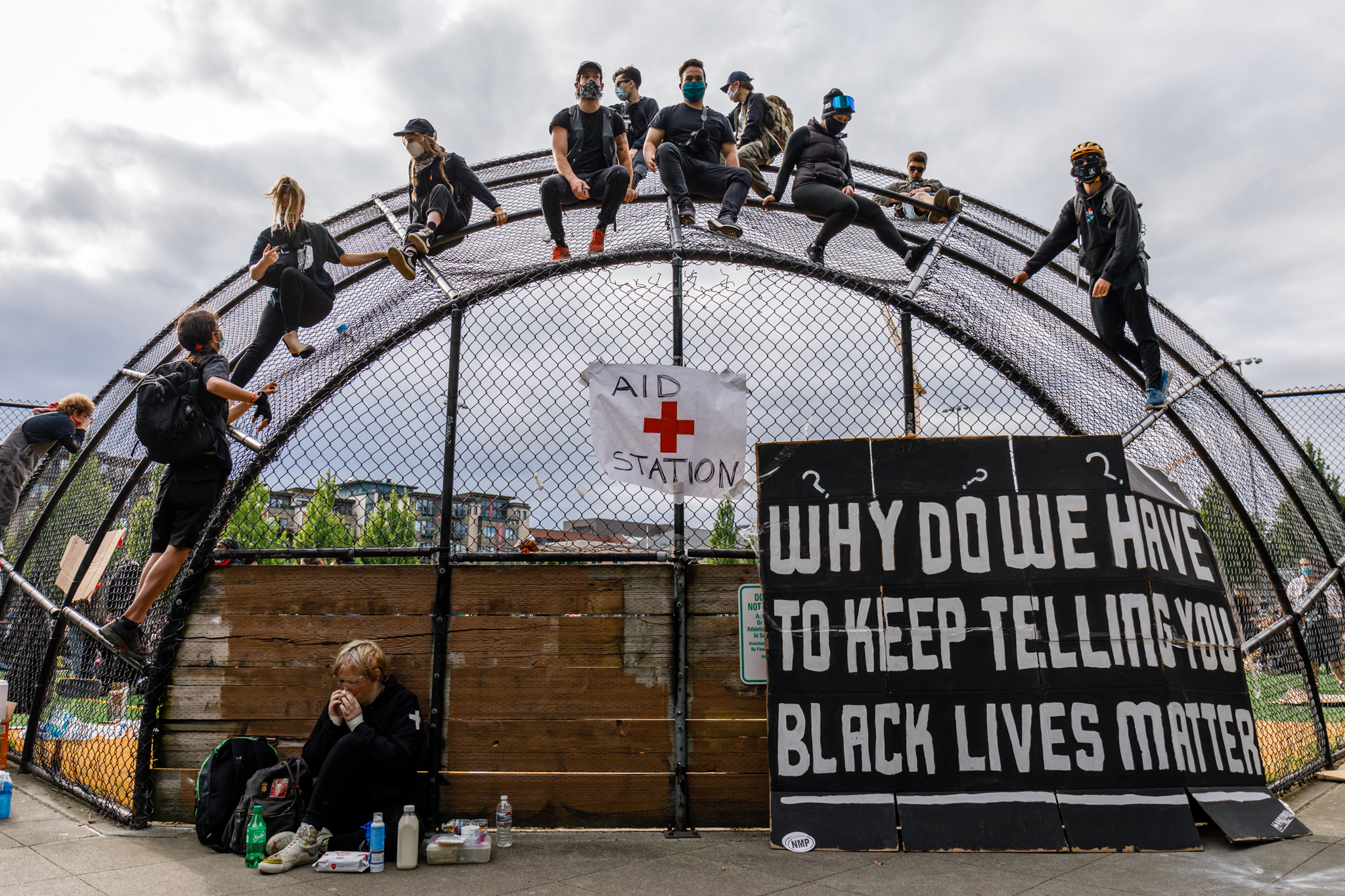
Aid station at the Bobby Morris Playfield backstop in Cal Anderson Park on June 3

The zone was initially centered around the East Precinct building, and barriers were set up on Pine Street for several blocks to stop incoming vehicles. The early territory reportedly encompassed five-and-a-half city blocks, including Cal Anderson Park (already active with demonstrators). It stretched north to East Denny Way, east to 12th Avenue (and part of 13th Avenue), south to East Pike, and west to Broadway. On June 9, one entrance to the zone was marked by a barrier reading "You Are Entering Free Capitol Hill". Other signs read, "You are now leaving the USA" and "Welcome to the Capitol Hill Autonomous Zone". Signage on the police station was modified as protesters rebranded it the "Seattle People's Department".

On June 16, after city officials agreed with protest organizers about a new footprint, the Seattle Department of Transportation (SDOT) installed concrete barriers wrapped in plywood in several areas along Pine Street and 10th and 12th Avenues (shrinking the area). The revised barrier spacing provided improved access for business deliveries, and the design offered space for decoration by artists affiliated with the protests. The new layout was posted on Durkan's blog: "The City is committed to maintaining space for community to come to together, protest and exercise their first amendment rights. Minor changes to the protest zone will implement safer and sturdier barriers to protect individuals in this area."

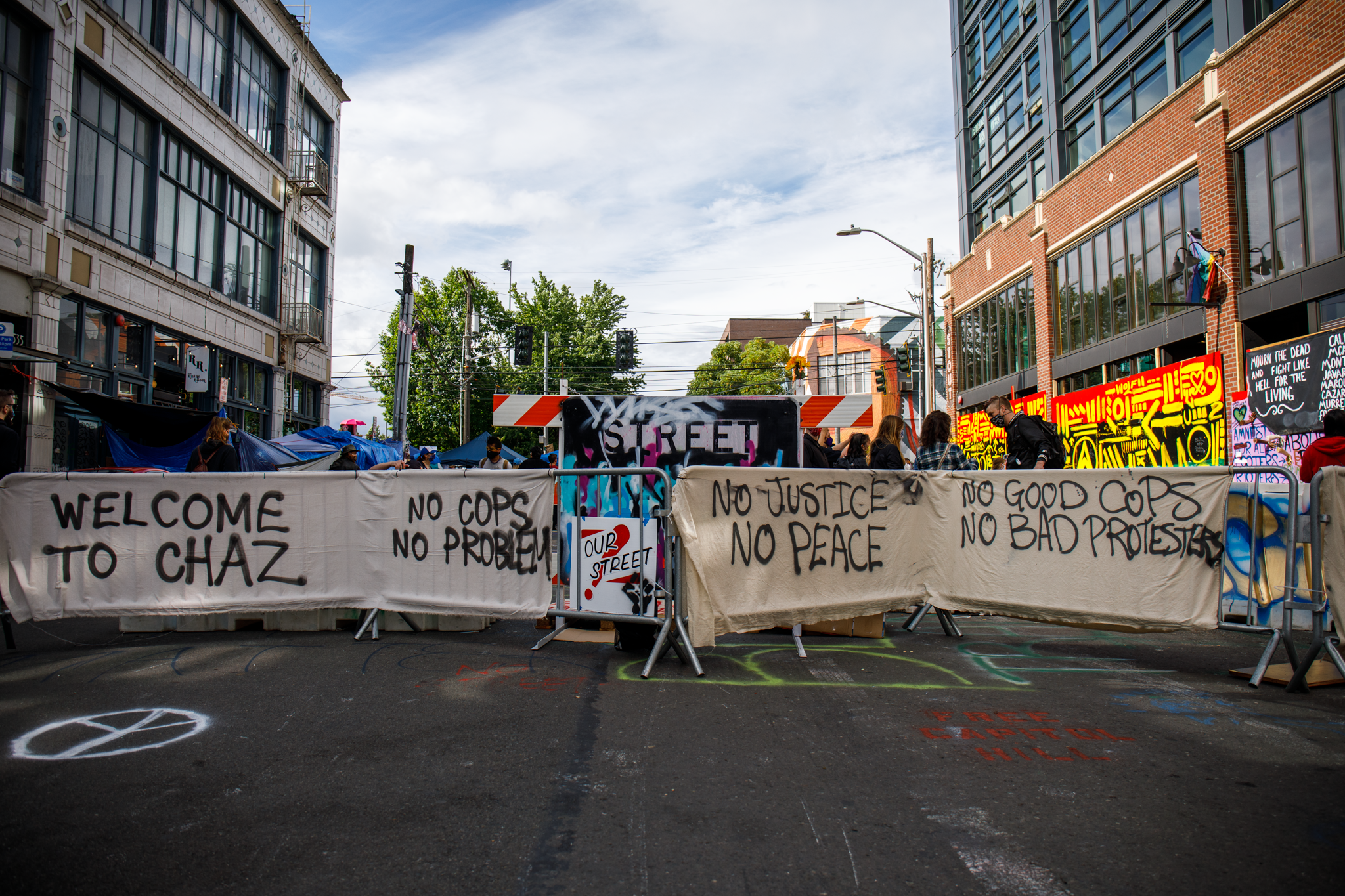
Entrance to the zone on June 13

KIRO-FM reported that on June 17, a large tent encampment was set up on 11th Avenue between Pike and Pine Streets and half of Cal Anderson Park "turned into a huge tent encampment with a massive community garden." The zone's borders were not clearly defined, and shifted daily. Its size was reduced over time, with The Seattle Times reporting that the area had "shrunk considerably" by June 24. Demonstrators redirected their focus to the East Precinct on June 23, when "the Capitol Hill protest zone camp cleared parts of its Cal Anderson Park core."

On June 30, police and other city employees removed a number of concrete barricades and concentrated others closer to the East Precinct. That day, notices were posted announcing a noon closure of Cal Anderson Park for cleaning and repairs; the garden and art created by protesters would be undisturbed. The remaining territory was cleared by Seattle police on July 1, and Cal Anderson Park was reportedly closed for repairs.

== Internal governance ==
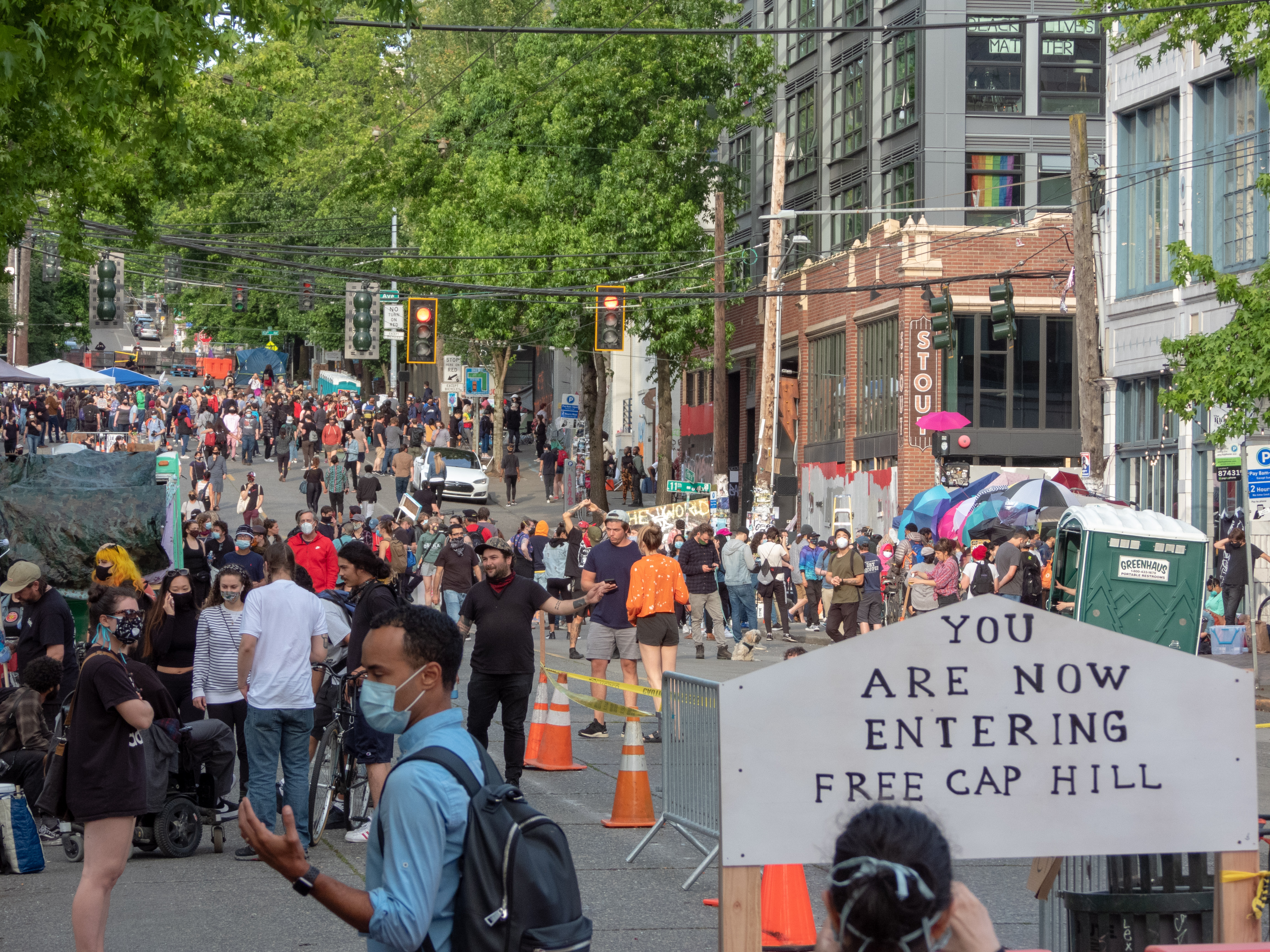
Western entrance on June 10, with a sign similar to Free Derry Corner

Occupants of the zone favored consensus decision-making in the form of general assembly, with daily meetings and discussion groups an alternative to designated leaders.

Protesters held frequent town hall meetings to decide strategy and make plans. Seattle officials said that they saw no evidence of antifa groups organizing in the zone, but some small-business owners blamed antifa for violence and intimidating their patrons. SPD Chief Carmen Best said on June 15, "There is no cop-free zone in the city of Seattle", indicating that officers would go into the zone if there were threats to public safety. "I think that the picture has been painted in many areas that shows the city is under siege," she added. "That is not the case." On August 7, The New York Times described the zone as police abolition in practice, reporting that police generally did not respond to calls in the zone.

Misinformation about its governance circulated. Conservative journalist Andy Ngo shared a video on June 15 of Seattle-based hip hop artist Raz Simone handing a rifle from the trunk of his car to another protester on June 8 (the day the zone was established) after "rumors developed [within the Zone] that members of the right-wing group Proud Boys were going to move into the protest area to set fires and stir chaos." CNN later called Simone the zone's "de facto leader", which he denied. Unbeknownst to the public at the time, Simone was in contact with Seattle Fire Chief Harold Scoggins during his time in CHOP. Simone left the area around July 15.

== Culture and amenities ==
=== Services ===
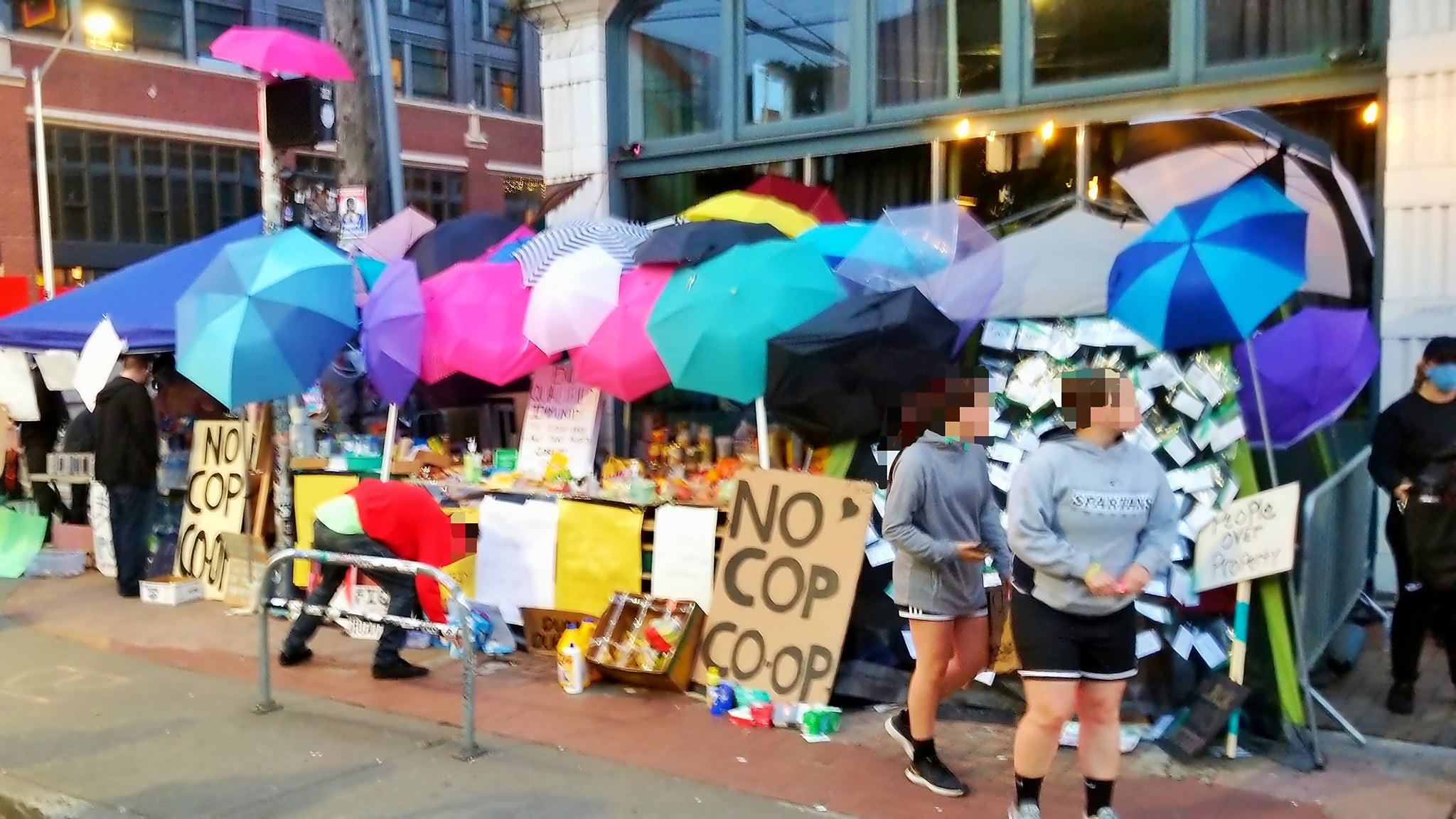
The No Cop Co-op on June 10

Protesters established the No Cop Co-op on June 9, offering free water, hand sanitizer, kebabs and snacks donated by the community. Stalls offered vegan curry, and others collected donations for the homeless. Organizers pitched tents next to the former precinct to hold the space. Two medical stations were established in the zone to provide basic health care, and the Seattle Department of Transportation provided portable toilets. The city provided waste removal, additional portable toilets and fire and rescue services, and the SPD said that it responded to 911 calls in the zone. The King County public health department provided COVID-19 testing in Cal Anderson Park for a period of time during the protests.

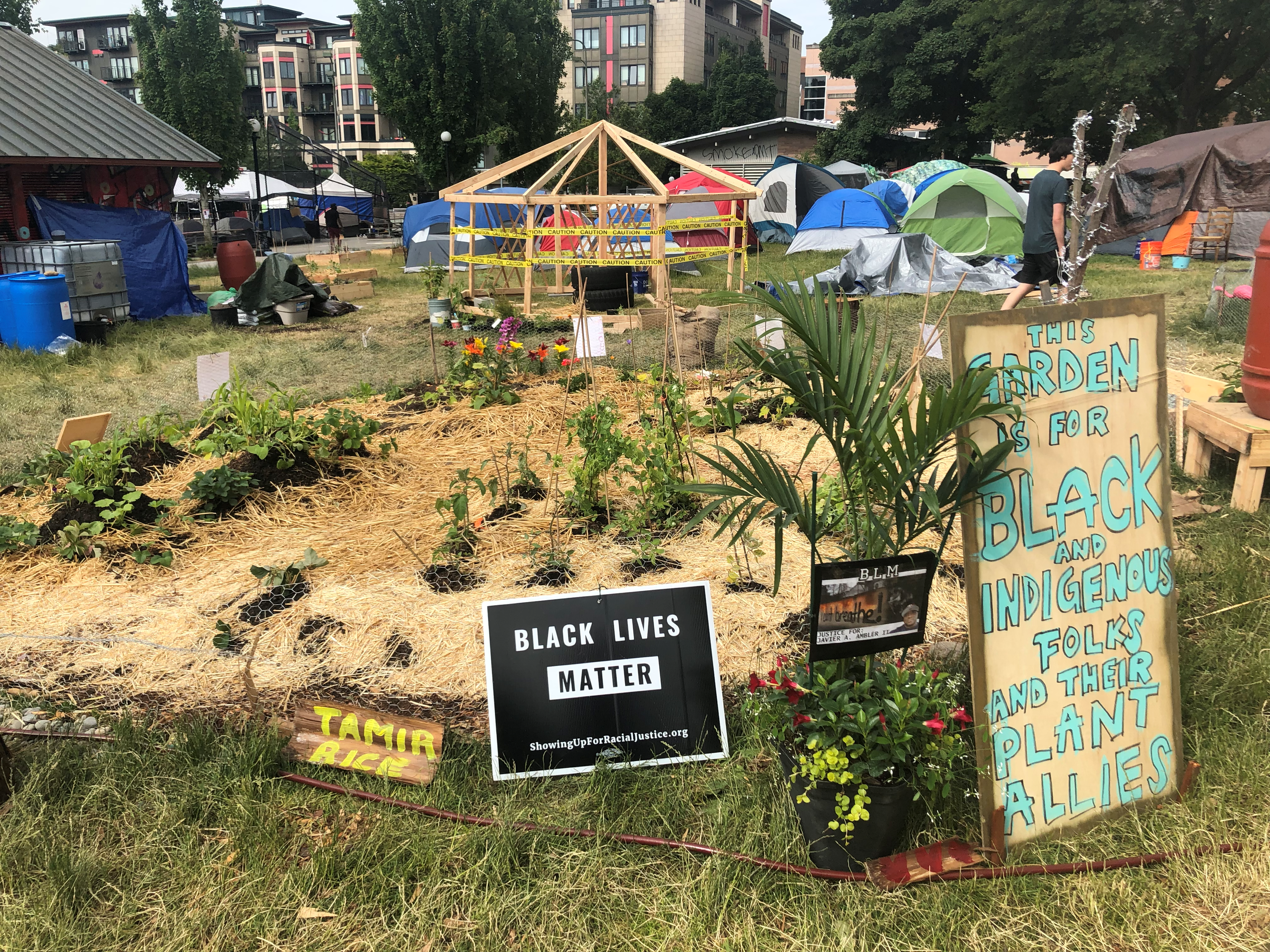
People's garden in Cal Anderson Park

On June 11, The Seattle Times reported that restaurant owners in the area had an uptick in walk-up business and a corresponding reduction in delivery costs. USA Today reported three days later that most businesses in the zone had closed, "although a liquor store, ramen restaurant and taco joint are still doing brisk business." According to The New York Times, "business crashed".

=== Community gardens ===
Vegetable gardens had materialized by June 11 in Cal Anderson Park, where activists attempted to grow a variety of food from seedlings to support people of color. The gardens were inaugurated with a basil plant introduced by Marcus Henderson, a resident of Seattle's Columbia City neighborhood. Henderson established his gardening movement as Black Star Farmers, and after the dissipation of the CHOP launched a GoFundMe to continue the work. After the park was cleared on July 1, he called supporters of the garden to help him advocate to the city that they allow it to remain as the Black Lives Memorial Garden. The effort succeeded as perhaps the least controversial proposition for how to make use of the public space in Cal Anderson Park after the CHOP's closure. However, in early October 2023, the Seattle Parks & Recreation Department announced their intent to remove the Black Lives Memorial Garden in favor of a "turf renovation" project for the site. The department, backed by SPD, bulldozed the garden at 6am on 27 December 2023.

=== Arts and culture ===
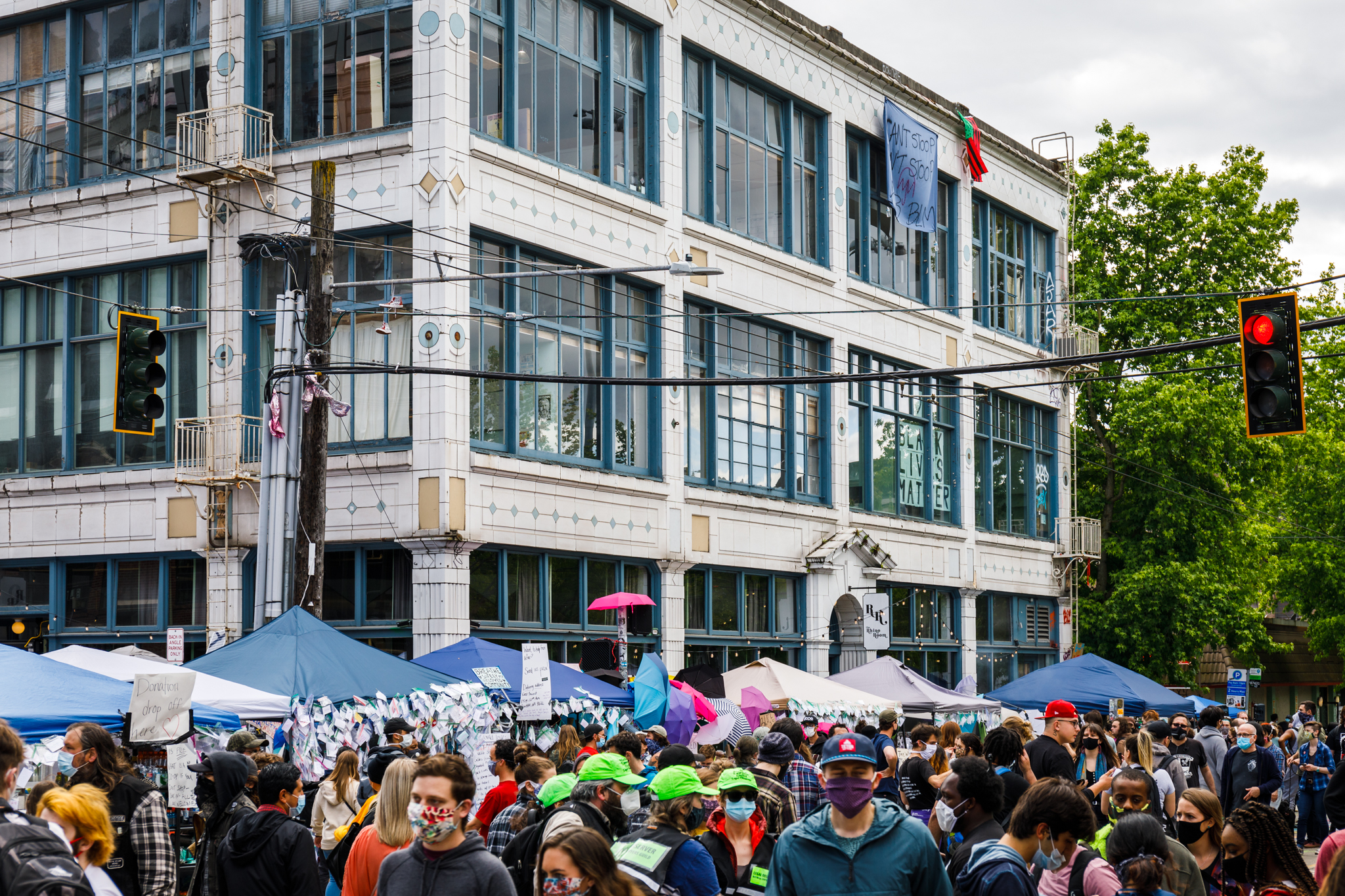
Visitors to the CHOP's co-op on June 14

The intersection of 12th and Pine was converted into a square for teach-ins (where a microphone was used for organizing) and to encourage those with destructive intentions to leave the area. An area at 11th and Pine was set aside as the "Decolonization Conversation Café", a discussion area with daily topics. An outdoor cinema with a sound system and projector was set up on June 9 and screened films, including 13th (a 2016 documentary by Ava DuVernay about racism and mass incarceration) and Paris Is Burning, a 1990 documentary by Jennie Livingston.

The Marshall Law Band (a Seattle-based hip-hop fusion group) began performing for protesters during the week of June 1–8 when protesters were confronting police at what was known as "the Western barricade" due to it being one block West of the entrance to the East Precinct. During this week, they played several hour sets with a sign of the protest demands near the stage every single night. The stage was close enough to the barricade that at times when relations between the protesters and cops got violent the band found themselves in the line of fire. They kept performing, even when there was tear gas in the air and rubber bullets being fired. The band continued playing regularly once the CHOP was established. In November 2020, Marshall Law Band released an album called 12th & Pine about their experience as the "House band of the CHOP".

A block-long Black Lives Matter street mural, on East Pine Street between 10th and 11th Avenues, was painted on June 10 and 11. Individual letters of the mural were painted by local artists of color, and supplies were purchased with donations from demonstrators and passersby.

==== Shrines ====
Visitors lit candles and left flowers at three shrines with photographs and notes expressing sentiments related to George Floyd and other victims of police brutality. Persons for whom shrines, murals, and/or vigils were created:

Person	Reason for memorializing	Type of memorial	Medium/components	Ref.
Charleena Lyles	Died from SPD action	Mural	Spray paint and ply wood	
George Floyd	Murdered by a Minneapolis police officer	Mural, Shrine	Spray paint and ply wood	
Lorenzo Anderson	Died in a shooting at the edge of the CHOP	Shrine	Flowers and balloons	

On June 19, events ranging from a "grief ritual" to a dance party were held to observe Juneteenth.

=== Names for the area ===
The Uprising (8:46)
- Short film on the development of CHOP; The Seattle Times, July 4, 2020
- From the Streets to the CHOP: How Seattle's Protests Have Evolved

The protest area had several names; the Capitol Hill Autonomous Zone (CHAZ) was most common at the outset, along with "Free Capitol Hill". By its second week, the area was more often referred to as the Capitol Hill Organized Protest (CHOP).

On June 13, a group of several dozen protest leaders agreed to change the name from CHAZ to CHOP. The name change was the result of a consensus to de-emphasize occupation and improve accuracy. According to TechCrunch, participants decided to change the name to "the Capitol Hill Occupied Protest—then, noting the fact that Seattle itself is an 'occupation' of native land, change the O to Organized."

=== Demands ===
The number of demands was debated; some believed that the protests were the beginning of a larger revolution, and others said that police brutality should remain the immediate focus. The protesters settled on three main demands:

1. Reducing city police funding by 50%;
2. Redistribute funds to community efforts, such as restorative justice and health care; and
3. Ensure that protesters would not be criminally liable.

Other demands by the collective included:

- Reallocation of SPD funds to community health:
  1. Socialized health and medicine;
  2. Free public housing;
  3. Public education;
  4. Naturalization services for undocumented immigrants; "no person is illegal"; and
  5. General community development (parks, etc.).
- The release of prisoners serving time for marijuana-related offenses or resisting arrest, and the expungement of their records;
- Mandatory retrials for people of color imprisoned for violent crimes;
- Educational reform, increasing the focus on Black and Native American history;
- Rent control to reverse gentrification; and
- Free college.

One early list (released June 9 in a Medium post attributed to "The Collective Black Voices at Free Capitol Hill") outlined 30 demands, beginning with the abolition of the Seattle Police Department, the armed forces, and prisons.

On June 10, about 1,000 protesters marched into Seattle City Hall demanding Durkan's resignation.

=== Security ===
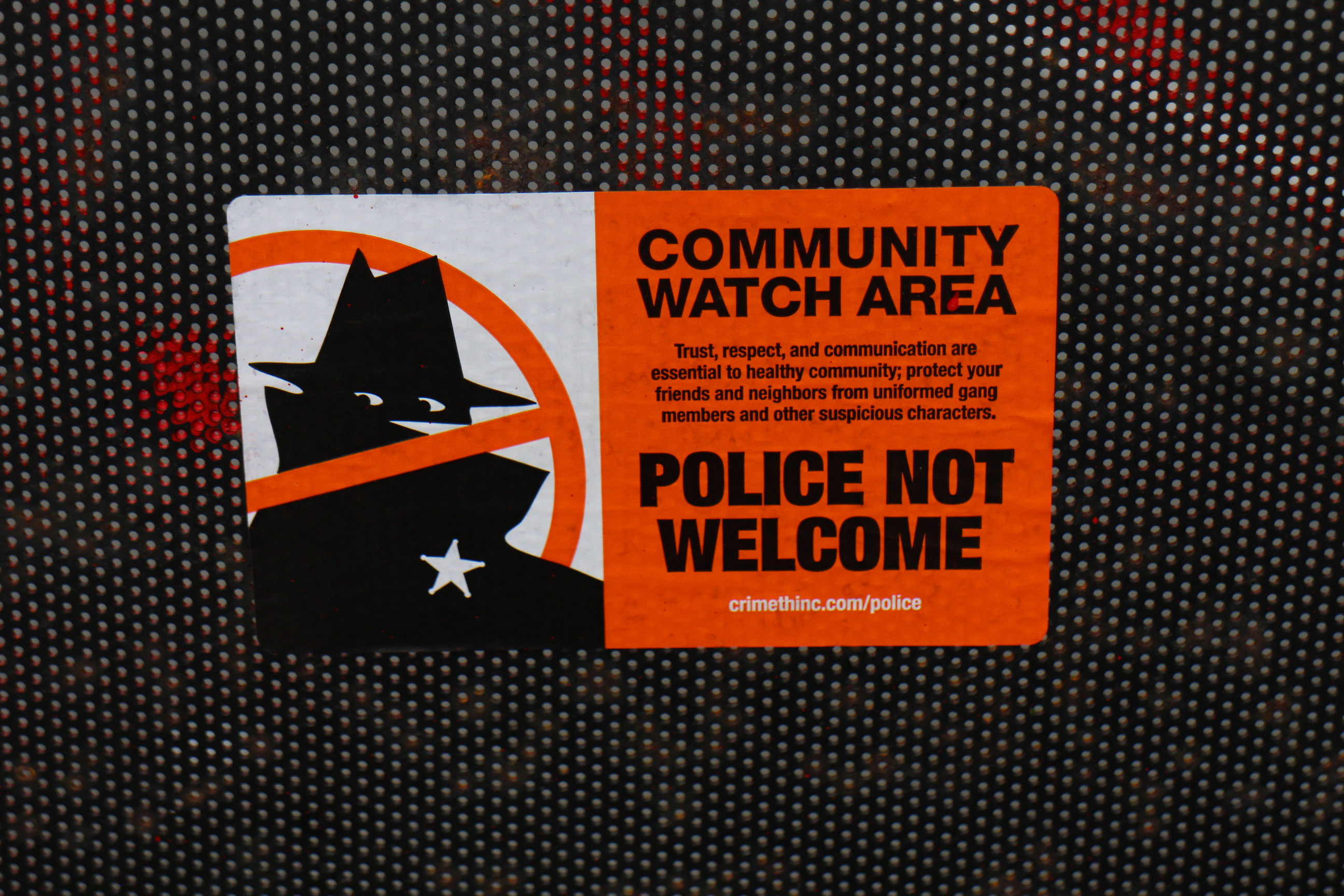
A CrimethInc. sticker in the zone declaring, "Police Not Welcome"

Protesters accepted open carry of firearms as a provision of safety. Members of the self-described anti-fascist, anti-racist and pro-worker Puget Sound John Brown Gun Club (PSJBGC) were reported on June 9 as carrying rifles in the zone in response to rumors of an attack by the right-wing Proud Boys. Although the zone was in the restricted area subject to Durkan's May 30 emergency order prohibiting the use of weapons (including guns), her ban did not mandate enforcement. The Washington Post reported on June 12 that PSJBGC was on site with no visible weapons, and USA Today reported that day that "no one appeared armed with a gun". Reporters from a Tacoma-based Fox affiliate were chased out of the zone by occupants on June 9.

Area businesses hired private protection services, including Iconic Global, Homeland Patrol Division and Fortress Security, during the occupation. The services deployed men and women (some in uniform and others in plainclothes, armed with AR-15 style rifles and pepper spray) to patrol the zone on foot and in SUVs. Volunteers in the area formed an informal group to provide security, emphasizing de-escalation and preventing vandalism.

==== Outside threats from the Proud Boys and Patriot Prayer ====
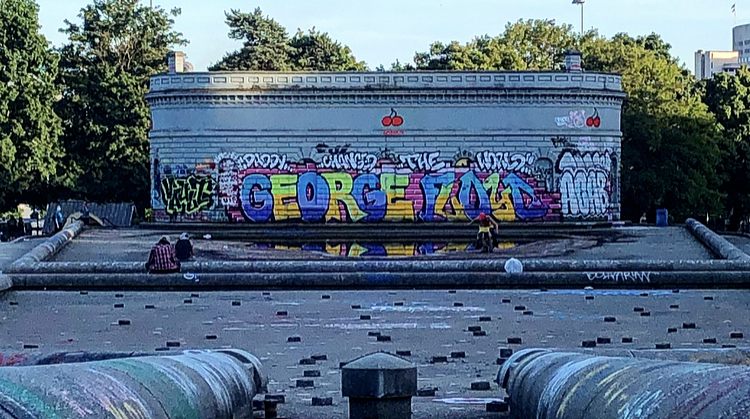
George Floyd mural at Cal Anderson Park's Lincoln Reservoir

Since the protest began, protesters were reportedly aware of the threat posed by the far-right groups Patriot Prayer (active in the Pacific Northwest) and the Proud Boys, a right-wing opposition group. On June 8, SPD used this fear in a ruse to attempt to move protesters from CHOP. Officers created fake radio reports of an armed Proud Boys march that intended to confront protesters in Capitol Hill. This raised tensions in CHOP and caused some protesters to arm themselves in preparation for a clash.

On June 15, armed members of the Proud Boys appeared in the zone at a Capitol Hill rally. The group intended to confront what it called protesters' "authoritarian behavior", and video of the clashes went viral.

Proud Boys affiliate and brawler Tusitala "Tiny" Toese was filmed in the zone punching a man and breaking his cellphone on June 15. He was known in the Pacific Northwest for fighting as a leader of Patriot Prayer and, after early 2019, as a chauvinist member of the Proud Boys. He has been called "the right-wing protester most frequently arrested in Portland." A Washington State resident, Toese is the subject of several reports by Portland's Willamette Week. He was later arrested for violating probation, due to video evidence of assault in the CHOP.

== Crime ==
=== Shootings ===
==== Before the zone ====
On June 7, the day before the zone's founding, a man drove toward a crowd of protesters. He was intercepted by a protester, who reached into his car, grabbing the wheel and punching the driver in an attempt to stop the vehicle, at which point the driver shot him. The driver then stopped and immediately surrendered to the police, saying his brother worked at the East Precinct. The victim, wounded in his upper right arm, was expected to fully recover within a year.

The driver claimed self-defense; prosecutors said the driver had provoked the incident and charged him with felony first-degree assault. They later reduced the charge to misdemeanor reckless driving, "based solely on evidentiary concerns", and affirmed that the driver's relationship to a police officer did not factor into the decision. The driver received fines, 24 months' probation, and a 30-day license suspension.

==== During the zone ====
===== June 20 =====
During the early morning of June 20, two people were shot in separate incidents at the edge of the protest zone. The first victim died of his wounds. It was initially unclear if the shootings were connected to the protests. In both cases, volunteer medics from the protest zone provided first aid while 911 calls were made, but when ambulances did not arrive, the medics drove the victims to the hospital themselves.

====== First shooting ======
Around 2:18 a.m. in the lead-up to the first shooting, the 19-year-old Horace Lorenzo Anderson Jr. had argued with 18-year old Marcel Long. Both men knew each other and had been in a fight in the past. Long threatened Anderson with a gun but was restrained by onlookers as Anderson walked away. When Long broke free, he shot Anderson four times. Emergency dispatchers received the first reports of gunshots at 10th Avenue and East Pine Street at 2:19 a.m.

Once the shooting ended, volunteer medics helped Anderson and performed CPR when his pulse stopped. Seattle Fire Department responded at 2:25 a.m. and staged two blocks away at 2:29 a.m., waiting for permission from SPD to enter the scene. In a miscommunication, the ambulance and police waited on each other to rendezvous. Not seeing any emergency vehicles by 2:35 a.m., the medics drove Anderson to further care: they drove to two previously-discussed meeting points without finding the ambulance before heading directly to Harborview Medical Center. At 2:38 a.m., armed members of SPD moved into CHOP in riot gear: they were confronted by protestors yelling that the victim had already been transported, and the officers retreated. Anderson arrived at Harborview at 2:45 a.m. He was pronounced dead at 2:53 a.m. Anderson was publicly mourned by his teachers and mother in the days following his death. Anderson was black, a local rapper known as "Lil Mob" and had graduated from high school the previous day.

Mike Solan, president of the Seattle Police Officer Guild, said the next morning that police "were prevented (from) providing that police service to the area to locate victims and or render aid." According to Carmen Best, police officers had wanted to reach the scene more quickly but were prevented by a "violent crowd". City Council member Lisa Herbold, chair of the public-safety committee, said that the suggestion that the crowd interfered with access to victims "defies belief". Later analysis by KUOW based on 911 transcripts, video recordings, and eyewitness testimony disputed these characterizations, instead arguing that miscommunication between the SPD and the Seattle Fire Department slowed the emergency response. A 2022 Office of Inspector General report repeated that ineffective communication between the departments slowed the response. A 2023 Office of Policy Accountability investigation into Best's statement determined it was a "misleading account of what had actually occurred" but the panel could not determine if Best was "knowingly and intentionally" dishonest because she refused to be interviewed.

On July 20, 2020 Anderson Jr.’s mother, Donnitta Sinclair Martin, filed a wrongful death claim against the City of Seattle. A federal judge dismissed the case in 2021. Horace Anderson and the estate of his late son, Horace Lorenzo Anderson, filed another complaint in King County Superior Court in November 2021, naming as defendants former Mayor Jenny Durkan, Council member Kshama Sawant, and the city of Seattle. The Anderson's attorney, Evan Oshan, filed documents saying with “no assistance or rescue from Seattle first responders, Lorenzo died in agony from his wounds". Seattle paid $500,000 to settle the wrongful-death lawsuit. A judge approved the settlement in April 2022. A year after the shooting, SPD arrested Long, and he pled guilty to Anderson Jr.'s murder in 2023. Long was sentenced to 14 years in prison with restitution payments for second-degree murder. He expressed remorse in court and his lawyer argued for leniency due to his learning disabilities and extended trauma.

====== Second shooting ======
The second victim, 33-year-old DeJuan Young, was found by a former nurse who determined with the help of a volunteer medic that he had two gunshot wounds. Young reported that he tried to leave after hearing the first shooting and was surrounded by a group of men, called a racist epithet, and shot at 11th and Pike. Transported to Harborview by 3:06 a.m., he was in critical condition the following day. KIRO-TV reported that Young was shot by different people one block from the site of Anderson's shooting. Young said, "I was shot by, I'm not sure if they're Proud Boys or KKK, but the verbiage that they said was hold this 'N——' and shot me." He expressed concern that his case was not being investigated due to the perception that protesters had "asked for the police not to be there, so don't act like y'all need them now," but Young was outside the zone when he was shot.

===== June 21 =====
Another shooting occurred on June 21. After being transported in a private vehicle to Harborview Medical Center, a 17-year-old boy was treated for a gunshot wound to the arm and released; he declined to speak to SPD detectives.

On June 22, Durkan said the violence was distracting from the message of thousands of peaceful protesters. "We cannot let acts of violence define this movement for change," she said, adding that the city "will not allow for gun violence to continue in the evenings around Capitol Hill." Durkan announced that officials were working with the community to end the zone. "It's time for people to go home," she said, "to restore order and eliminate the violence on Capitol Hill." At the same press conference, Best described "groups of individuals engaging in shootings, a rape, assault, burglary, arson and property destruction ... I cannot stand by, not another second, and watch another black man, or anyone really, die in our streets while people aggressively thwart the efforts of police and other first responders from rescuing them."

===== June 23 =====
On June 23, a third shooting near the zone left a man in his thirties with wounds that were not life-threatening. The SPD was reportedly investigating, but the victim refused to provide information about the attack or a description of the shooter.

===== June 29 =====
The fourth shooting near the zone occurred in the early morning of June 29. A 16-year-old boy, Antonio Mays Jr., was killed, and a 14-year-old boy, Robert West, was critically injured. A third teen escaped from the vehicle after it crashed. A lawsuit filed by West and his attorney Evan Oshan blamed "city leadership for not just allowing, but promoting, the CHOP zone". Oshan also represents Mays's estate. Mays Sr was awarded $26 million and the estate of Mays Jr was awarded $4 million as of February 2026, and West's complaints are still unresolved as of 2025, and SPD said the case remained active. Mays was a resident of San Diego, California, and reportedly left for Seattle a week earlier. A video showed a series of 12 or 13 gunshots at 2:54 a.m., just before a voice warns of "multiple vehicles", "multiple shooters", and a "stolen white Jeep" as protesters scrambled into position. After a five-minute lull, another 18 gunshots are heard as the "white Jeep" crashes into a barricade or a portable toilet. CHOP medics attempted to aid the two victims and transport them to further care. After calling 911, the medics were directed to a rendezvous point to meet an ambulance, but miscommunications between SPD and the fire department caused the ambulance to repeatedly drive away from the transport car, and Mays died in the car.

During its investigation, the SPD discovered that the crime scene had been disturbed. Police made no arrests in any of the shootings since June 20. According to a volunteer medic who witnessed the incident, CHOP security forces shot at the SUV driven by the teenagers after it crashed into a concrete barrier.

=== Extortion allegations ===
In June 2020, allegations about the extortion of business owners in CHOP were shared widely in the media, even though the claims had been debunked. A 2022 review panel by Seattle's Office of Inspector General critiqued SPD's communications that spread the allegations. The panel concluded that the police had overstated claims about CHOP to make it seem more dangerous.

==== Initial claims ====
The allegations arose from a blog that said its source was unnamed police officers. At a June 10 press conference, Assistant Police Chief Deanna Nollette shared the allegations, claiming they were reports from local community members. Nollette said that police had received reports of "armed individuals" passing barricades set up by protesters as checkpoints, "intimidat[ing] community members", and that police "heard anecdotally" of residents and businesses being asked to pay a fee to operate in the area: "This is the crime of extortion."

Later that day, the staff of the Office of Emergency Management investigated and disproved the allegations, sharing their findings with city and police leaders. The next morning, Chief Best repeated Nollette's claims in a video released by the department. Later on June 11, Best backtracked, saying that police had not received "any formal reports" of extortion, and the Greater Seattle Business Association said that it "found no evidence of this occurring".

==== Press coverage ====
The extortion allegations were repeated in global media coverage of CHOP, even though SPD later retracted its claims. A July 2020 Seattle Times column labeled this effect the spread of misinformation. The column compared this to other mistaken police statements on CHOP that received wide coverage, including Best's statement that calls for police services had tripled during CHOP when they had actually dropped by a third, and a department tweet about "improvised explosives" that actually showcased a candle. In contrast, The New York Times reported in August that during the zone's existence, some small business owners were intimidated by demonstrators with baseball bats, asked to pledge loyalty to the movement and choose between CHOP and the police, put on a list of "cop callers", harassed, or threatened with death by a mob.

In January 2021, SPD retracted the claims made in Best's June 11 video. In June 2022, the South Seattle Emerald reported that a city leader debunked the claims in a report shared with Best before the June 11 video was released. In a 2022 review of SPD's conduct during CHOP, a panel of police and community members studied SPD's communications to help Seattle's Inspector General recommend departmental changes. The panel said that the June 10 press conference created "cynicism and distrust" and critiqued SPD for its unsubstantiated claims about extortion, armed checkpoints, and incendiary devices. The review also criticized SPD's attempts to manipulate protesters by fabricating a nearby Proud Boys march.

=== Other crimes ===
On June 15, KIRO-TV reported a break-in and fire at an auto shop near the zone to which the SPD did not respond; police chief Carmen Best later said that officers observed the building from a distance and saw no sign of a disturbance. On June 16, Seattle's KIRO-TV quoted an eight-year tenant of an apartment near the East Precinct: "We are just sitting ducks all day. Now every criminal in the city knows they can come into this area and they can do anything they want as long as it isn't life-threatening, and the police won't come in to do anything about it." Frustrated by blocked streets, criminal behavior and lawlessness, some residents moved out and others installed security cameras. A man who said he "100 percent" supported the protest told KOMO-TV, "I don't even feel safe anymore."

On June 18, a volunteer medic intervened during a sexual assault in a tent in the occupied park area; the alleged perpetrator was arrested. NPR reported that day, "Nobody inside the protest zone thinks a police return would end peacefully. Small teams of armed anti-fascists are also present, self-proclaimed community defense forces who say they're ready to fight if needed but that de-escalation is preferred."

The SPD police blotter page listed FBI-reported law-enforcement incidents in the area: 37 incidents in 2019, and 65 incidents through June 30, 2020.

== Commentary ==
On June 9, U.S. Senator Ted Cruz said that the zone was "endangering people's lives". President Trump demanded the following day that Inslee and Durkan "take back" the zone, saying that if they did not do it, he would do it for them. Inslee condemned Trump's involvement in the situation, telling him to "stay out of Washington state's business". On Twitter, Trump criticized Inslee and Durkan and called the protesters "domestic terrorists", and Durkan told the president to "go back to [his] bunker", referring to his evacuation to the Presidential Emergency Operations Center during protests the previous month. Durkan said on June 11 that Trump wanted to construct a narrative about domestic terrorists with a radical agenda to fit his law-and-order initiatives, and that lawfully exercising the First Amendment right to demand more of society was patriotism, not terrorism.

USA Today called the zone a "protest haven", the World Socialist Web Site described the zone as an "anarchistic commune", and The Nation called it "an anti-capitalist vision of community sovereignty without police." Conservative commentator Guy Benson called the occupation of Capitol Hill "communist cosplay". Rosette Royale, writing for Rolling Stone, called the zone "a peaceful realm where people build nearly everything on the fly, as they strive to create a world where the notion that black lives matter shifts from being a slogan to an ever-present reality." Tobias Hoonhout, writing for National Review, contrasted the mainstream media coverage of the zone, which he deemed sympathetic, to the negative coverage of the 2016 Malheur National Wildlife Refuge occupation. Gregory J. Wallance, writing for The Hill, called the zone "a cautionary tale for police defunding".

Fox News's website posted photographs purportedly from the zone on June 12, include a man with a military-style rifle from an earlier Seattle protest and smashed windows from other parts of Seattle. The website posted an article about protests in Seattle whose accompanying photo, of a burning city, had been taken in Saint Paul, Minnesota, the previous month. According to The Washington Post, "Fox's coverage contributed to the appearance of armed unrest". The manipulated and misleading photos were removed, with Fox News saying that it "regret[ted] these errors". Monty Python alumnus John Cleese tweeted on June 15, after a Fox News anchorwoman read a Reddit post on-air indicating purported "signs of rebellion" within the zone, that the post was a joke referring to a scene in Monty Python and the Holy Grail.

Activists in other cities sought to replicate the autonomous zone in their communities; police stopped protesters in Portland, Oregon, and Asheville, North Carolina. Governor of Tennessee Bill Lee condemned attempts to create an autonomous area in Nashville on June 12, warning protesters in the state that "autonomous zones and violence will not be tolerated." In Philadelphia, a group established an encampment which was compared to the Seattle occupation; however, the group's focus was on protesting Philadelphia's anti-homelessness laws. In what CNN called "an apparent reference to the Capitol Hill Autonomous Zone (CHAZ) in Seattle," protesters spray-painted "BHAZ" (Black House Autonomous Zone) on June 22 on the pillars of St. John's Episcopal Church, across the street from Lafayette Square in Washington, D.C. The next day, Trump tweeted: "There will never be an 'Autonomous Zone' in Washington, D.C., as long as I'm your President. If they try they will be met with serious force!" Twitter cited Trump's tweet for violating the company's policy against abusive behavior: "specifically the presence of a threat of harm against an identifiable group."

Politico reported that CHOP "was a recurring theme throughout" debate by the U.S. House Judiciary Committee of the Democratic-sponsored police reform bill, on June 17. Representative Debbie Lesko proposed an amendment to cut off federal police grants to any municipality which permits an autonomous zone. Pramila Jayapal, whose district includes the CHOP, blamed Fox News and "right-wing media pundits" for spreading misinformation. The bill was passed by a majority-Democratic vote.

On July 1, referring to the expulsion of protesters from the zone that day by police, U.S. Attorney General William Barr praised Best "for her courage and leadership in restoring the rule of law in Seattle." White House Press Secretary Kayleigh McEnany said, "I am pleased to inform everyone that Seattle has been liberated ... Anarchy is anti-American, law and order is essential, peace in our streets will be secured." The next day, Trump said: "I'm glad to see, in Seattle, they took care of the problem, because as they know, we were going in to take. We were ready to go in and they knew that too. And they went in and they did what they had to do."

== See also ==
- Paris Commune
- Freetown Christiania
