= Capitol Hill Pride Festival =

Pride festival in Seattle, Washington, US

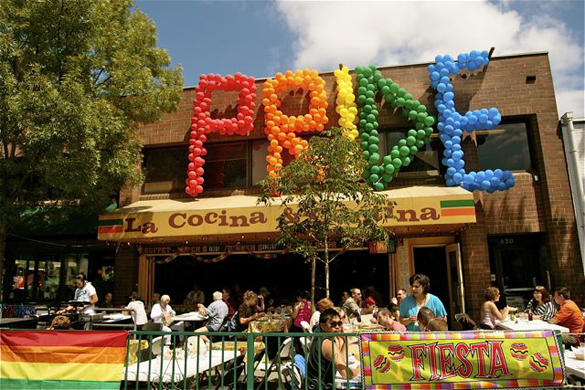
- Genre: Pride, LGBT
- Dates: Last Saturday of June
- Locations: Capitol Hill, Seattle, Washington, US
- Years active: 1997 – present
- Founders: Charlotte LeFevre
- Website: Capitol Hill Pride Festival

The Capitol Hill Pride Festival is an annual one-day pride festival that is geared towards the LGBT community and is a prelude to the Seattle Pridefest event. CHPF takes place on the last Saturday of June every year, in the Capitol Hill area. The festival includes three music stages: La Cocina Santiago, Julia's on Broadway and the main stage. Ever since its debut in 2009 by director Charlette LeFevre, historic performers include Leon Hendrix, Jinkx Monsoon, Eriam Sisters, Mary Lambert, and Massive Monkeys, with appearances by Jim McDermott, Ed Murray and budding local acts like DJ John Judge and Sarey Savy

== History ==
As of 2013, the estimated attendance was over 30,000 attendees. Sponsors include Wells Fargo, Pride Foundation, Kelcema Productions and many others that are listed on the website year after year. To this day, Charlette LeFevre and Philip Lipson program the event.
