= Julia's =

Restaurants in Seattle, Washington, United States

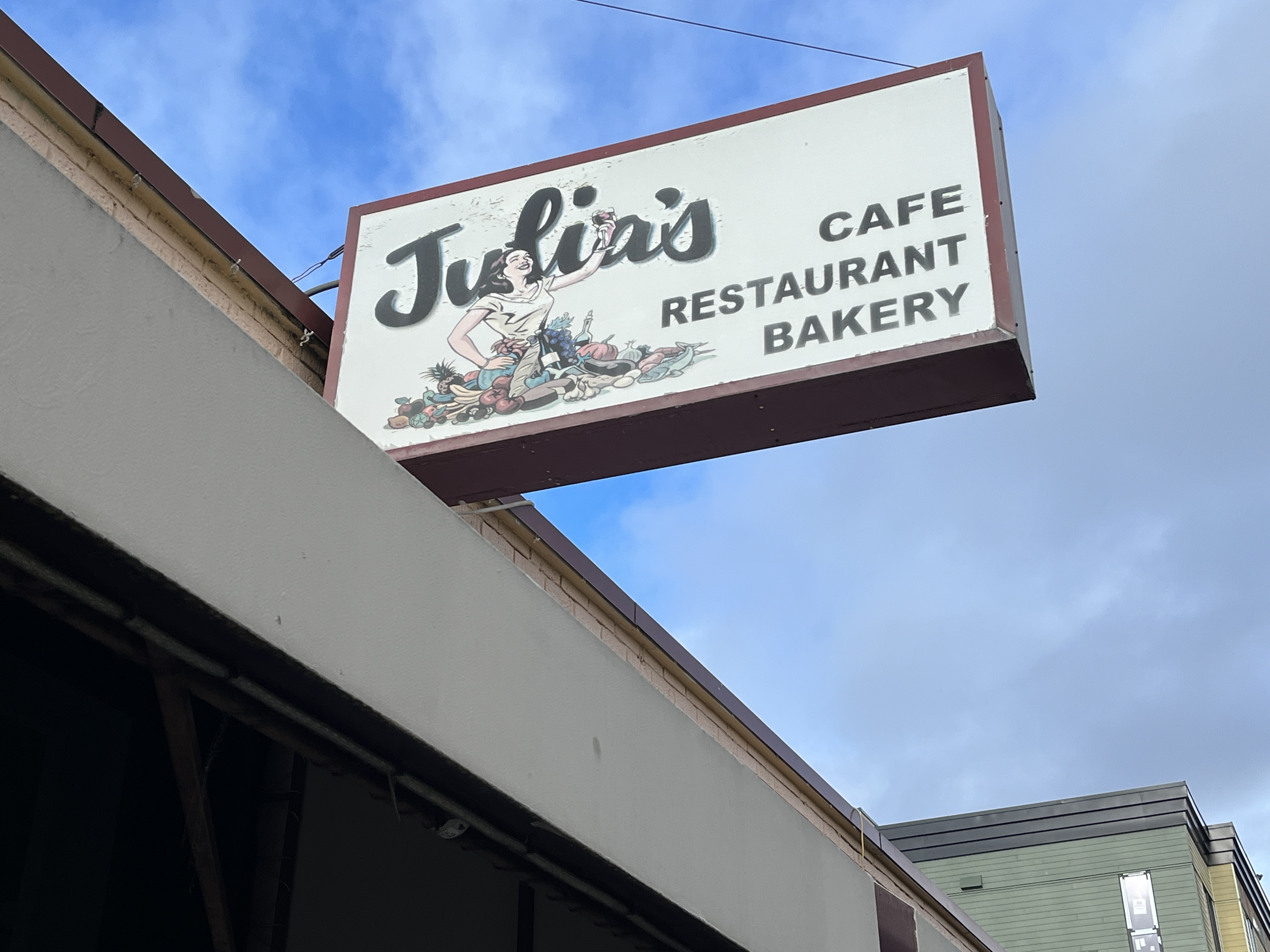
Sign at the Wallingford, Seattle location, 2024

Julia's is a small chain of restaurants in Seattle, in the U.S. state of Washington. "Descendants" of the original restaurant have operated on Capitol Hill (Julia's on Broadway) and in Issaquah, Queen Anne, and Wallingford.

== History ==
=== Capitol Hill ===
Julia's on Broadway operates on Seattle's Capitol Hill, Seattle.

=== Wallingford ===
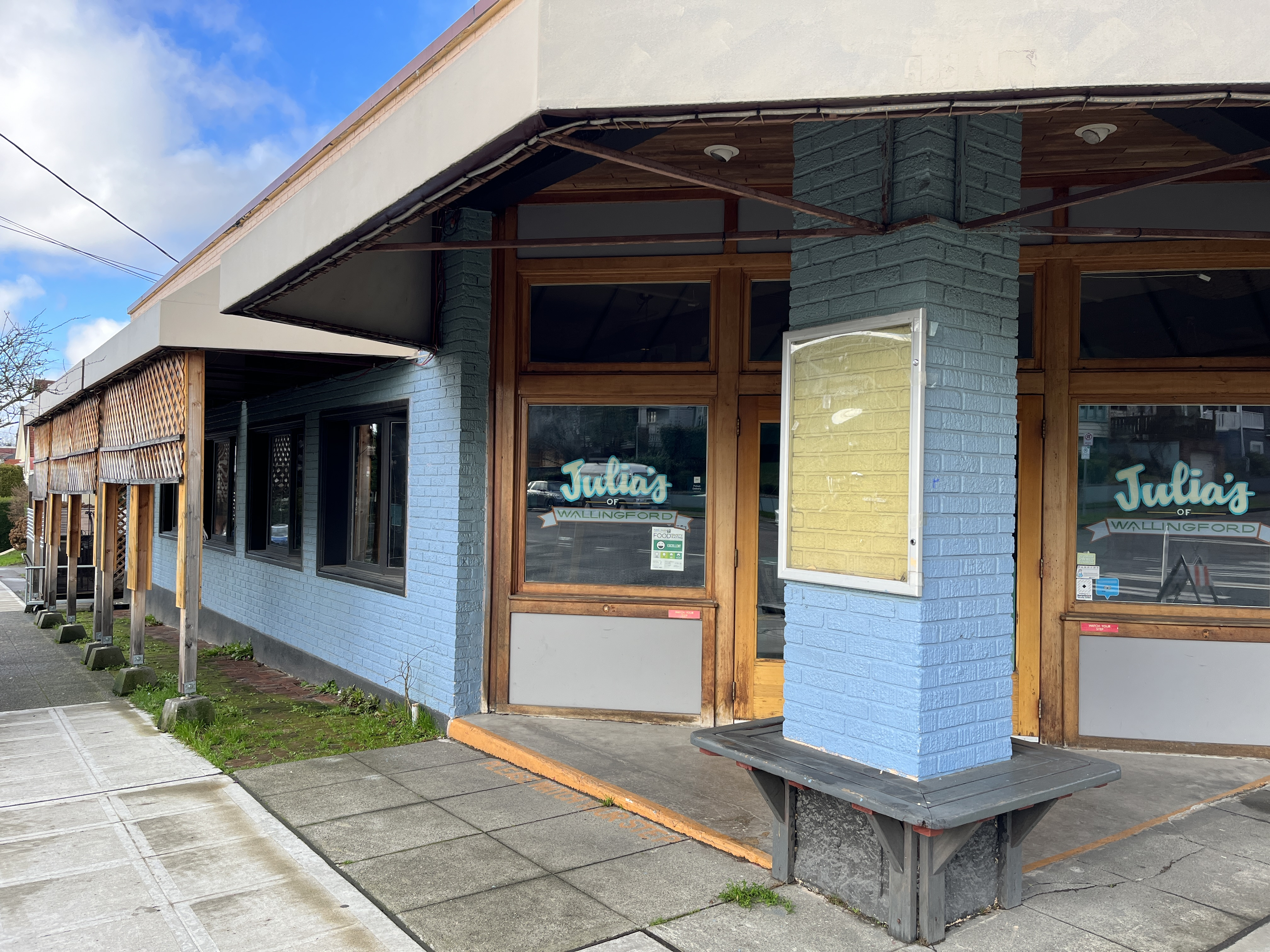
Exterior of the restaurant in Wallingford, Seattle, in January 2024

Julia Miller opened the Wallingford restaurant during the early 1980s. Karsten Betd, who initially worked as a busboy and later became a manager, purchased the business in 1993. Betd's daughter Lauren inherited the business. The restaurants closed on December 31, 2023, but is slated to reopen in 2024.

According to The Infatuation, the restaurant serves American cuisine. Like Julia's on Broadway, the restaurant has hosted drag shows.

== See also ==
- List of restaurant chains in the United States
