= Raz Simone =

American rapper

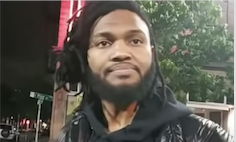
- Simone at the June 2020 Capitol Hill Autonomous Zone
- Born: Solomon Samuel Simone; January 15, 1990 (age 36); Seattle, Washington, U.S.
- Other name: Razpy
- Occupation: Rapper
- Children: 1
- Musical career
- Genre: Hip hop
- Instrument: Vocals
- Years active: 2014–current
- Labels: Black Umbrella; H1ghr Music
- Website: razsimone.com

Solomon Samuel Simone (born January 15, 1990), known by his stage name Raz Simone (/ræz sɪˈmoʊn/), is an African-American recording artist and songwriter from Seattle, Washington. A hip hop artist who started under the name Razpy, he built his brand by releasing EPs, touring, and filming music videos through his company Black Umbrella.

Simone gained recognition after releasing his debut solo EP, Solomon Samuel Simone. He became the subject of media coverage for his association with the Capitol Hill Autonomous Zone (CHAZ), part of the George Floyd protests in Seattle, in which he distributed a gun to a protester amid rumors the Proud Boys were gathering nearby.

== Early life ==
Simone attended a private elementary school. In 2007, he worked for the Boys & Girls Club and was in the Running Start dual enrollment program.

== Music ==
Upon release of his debut solo EP, Solomon Samuel Simone, Simone garnered the attention of 300 Entertainment executives Lyor Cohen, Todd Moscowitz, and Kevin Liles which resulted in a partnership between the newly established 300 Entertainment and his Black Umbrella Imprint.

After the debut EP, Simone toured and released his first full-length album Cognitive Dissonance. In 2016 Simone released Trap Spirituals. He was nominated for XXL's Freshman List. In June 2016 Simone played shows in seven cities, opening for Macklemore and Ryan Lewis.

In May 2020, at a parking lot at Seattle Center, Simone held a "pop-up, drive-in concert" (a type of concert developed in response to the COVID-19 pandemic, in order to allow for social distancing).

== CHAZ-related controversies ==
In June 2020, during the George Floyd protests in Seattle, Simone emerged as an active member of the self-declared Capitol Hill Autonomous Zone. CNN described him as the "de facto leader of the autonomous zone."

Conservative news outlets and publications including Fox News, Townhall, New York Post, and City Journal featured Simone prominently in their coverage of the zone, characterizing him as a "warlord" policing the area with an AK-47 and highlighting an interaction where he allegedly assaulted a tagger. A Facebook video shows Simone distributing a firearm to a protester. According to Snopes, on June 15 Andy Ngo presented a video clip from Simones's June 8 Facebook feed where Simone takes a rifle from the trunk of his car and hands it to another protester after "rumors developed that members of the right-wing group Proud Boys were going to move into the protest area to set fires and stir chaos."

Simone refuted the characterizations of him made by media outlets.

== Sexual abuse and assault allegations ==
In January 2021, two women stepped forward to publicly accuse Simone of coercion and repeated physical abuse. In 2022, Simone was sued by five women alleging sexual abuse and assault. Four of them say that he sex trafficked and abused them. One of the alleged victims claims Simone sex trafficked her in Las Vegas for over a year, until she finally broke free in 2017. She stated that Simone held her captive for three days within a confined space and that more than once he forcibly had sex with her and strangled her. Court documents reportedly state Simone targets "young, vulnerable women" who are involved in sex work or susceptible to it. Simone has denied these allegations.

== Discography ==
- 5 Good Reasons EP with Sam Lachow (2012)
- Samuel Solomon Simone (2013)
- Cognitive Dissonance pt. 1 (2014)
- Baby Jesus (2014)
- Macklemore Privilege & Chief On Keef Violence (2015)
- Cognitive Dissonance pt. 2 (2015)
- Trap Spirituals (2016)
- Closer (2018)
- Drive Theory (2018)
- Still Love (2019)
