= Julia's on Broadway =

Restaurant in Seattle, Washington, U.S.

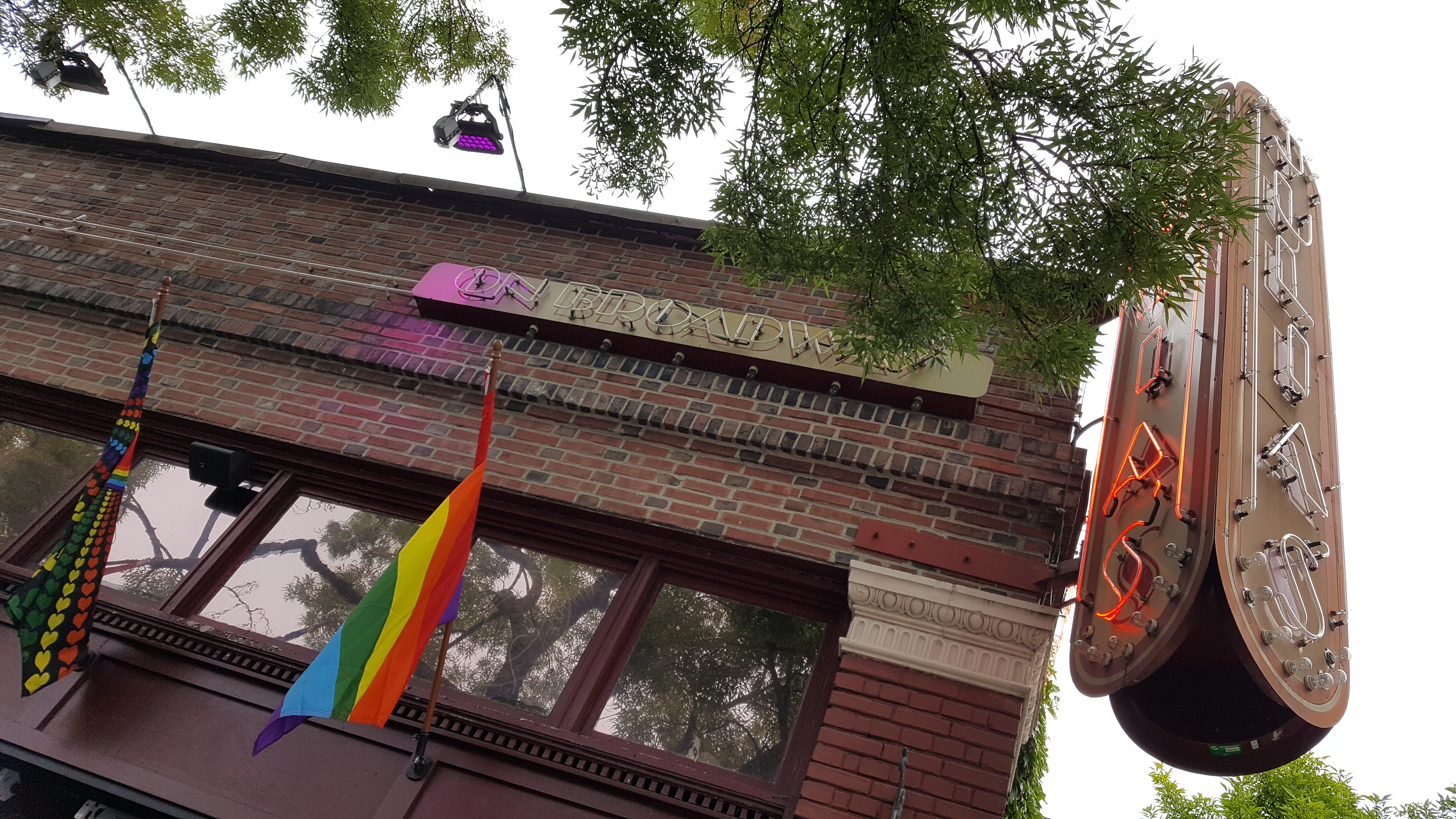
- The restaurant's exterior in 2018
- Interactive map of Julia's on Broadway

Restaurant information
- Location: Seattle, Washington, United States
- Coordinates: 47.62129°N 122.32060°W

Julia's on Broadway, or simply Julia's, is a restaurant in Seattle's Capitol Hill, in the United States. It is associated with a small chain of restaurants in the metropolitan area called Julia's.

== Description and history ==
The LGBTQ-owned restaurant hosts the drag show Le Faux. During the COVID-19 pandemic, Julia's closed temporarily. Some of the show's participants streamed performances online. Julia's has also hosted Jinkx Monsoon and Irene Dubois.

Eladio Preciado is an owner, director, and producer.

== Reception ==
In 2023, Aimee Rizzo of The Infatuation wrote, "To be clear, you're absolutely not going to Julia's for the food—it is not good. You're going because this is the oldest drag cabaret in Seattle. That means intense production value, intricate headpieces worn by host Shay Fox, backup dancers, and group numbers, not to mention fun drinks like the 'Electric Vibrator' and 'Cheating B*tch.' (Those are the tamer names.) There's a throwback-themed brunch show on Sunday afternoons, night shows on Fridays and Saturdays, and guest productions in between."
