= List of Black Lives Matter street murals =

List of street murals painted in response to the murder of George Floyd

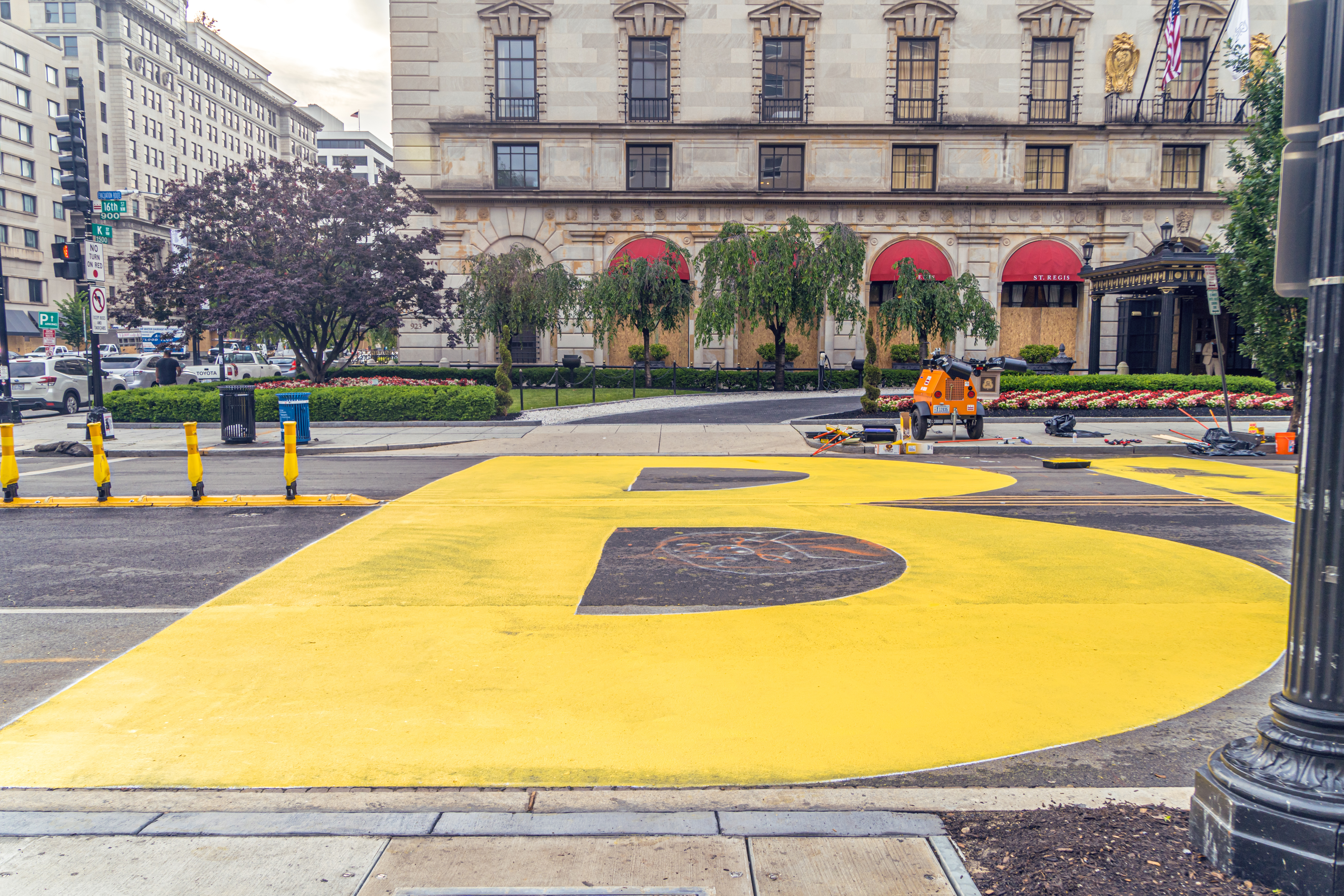
The Washington, D.C. Black Lives Matter mural painted in June 2020

On June 5, 2020, during the George Floyd protests, the DC Public Works Department painted the words "Black Lives Matter" in 35-foot-tall (11 m) yellow capital letters on 16th Street NW on the north of Lafayette Square, part of President's Park near the White House, with the assistance of the MuralsDC program of the DC Department of Public Works, with the DC flag accompanying the text. Mayor Muriel Bowser renamed the area Black Lives Matter Plaza. Many other cities across the United States, as well as in Canada and the United Kingdom, subsequently painted their own "Black Lives Matter" paintings on streets, typically if inaccurately called "murals", although they are not on walls.

By 2025, around 150 "Black Lives Matter" murals remained around the world. The Black Lives Matter Street Mural Map project has a database of each mural.

== Alabama ==
- Birmingham – "Black Lives Matter" was painted in yellow along First Avenue South in the Parkside District. On June 22, the city council did not vote on whether to rename part of Sixteenth Street North to "Black Lives Matter Boulevard", due to urging from local activists.
- Hobson City – On June 19, residents painted "Black Towns Matter" using yellow and red road paint along Martin Luther King Boulevard and plan to later paint "Black Lives Matter" along another section of the street.
- Mobile – On June 21, "Black Lives Matter" was painted in yellow along Conti Street downtown. Rain washed away the mural the following day.
- Montgomery – On June 19, volunteers painted "Black Lives Matter" around Court Square Fountain, once the site of a slave market, to commemorate Juneteenth. The mural is temporary and will be washed away once it begins to wear.

== California ==
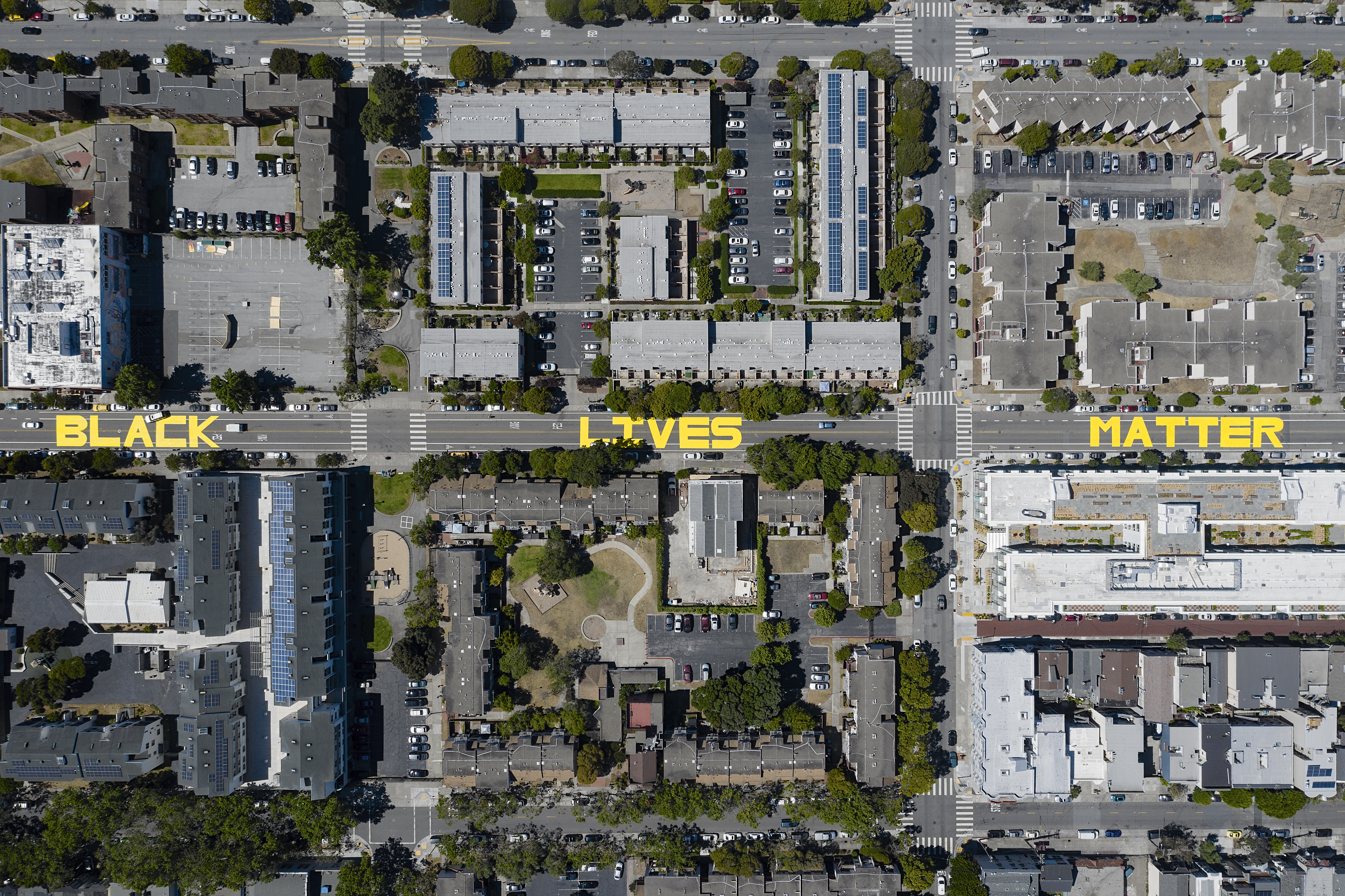
San Francisco

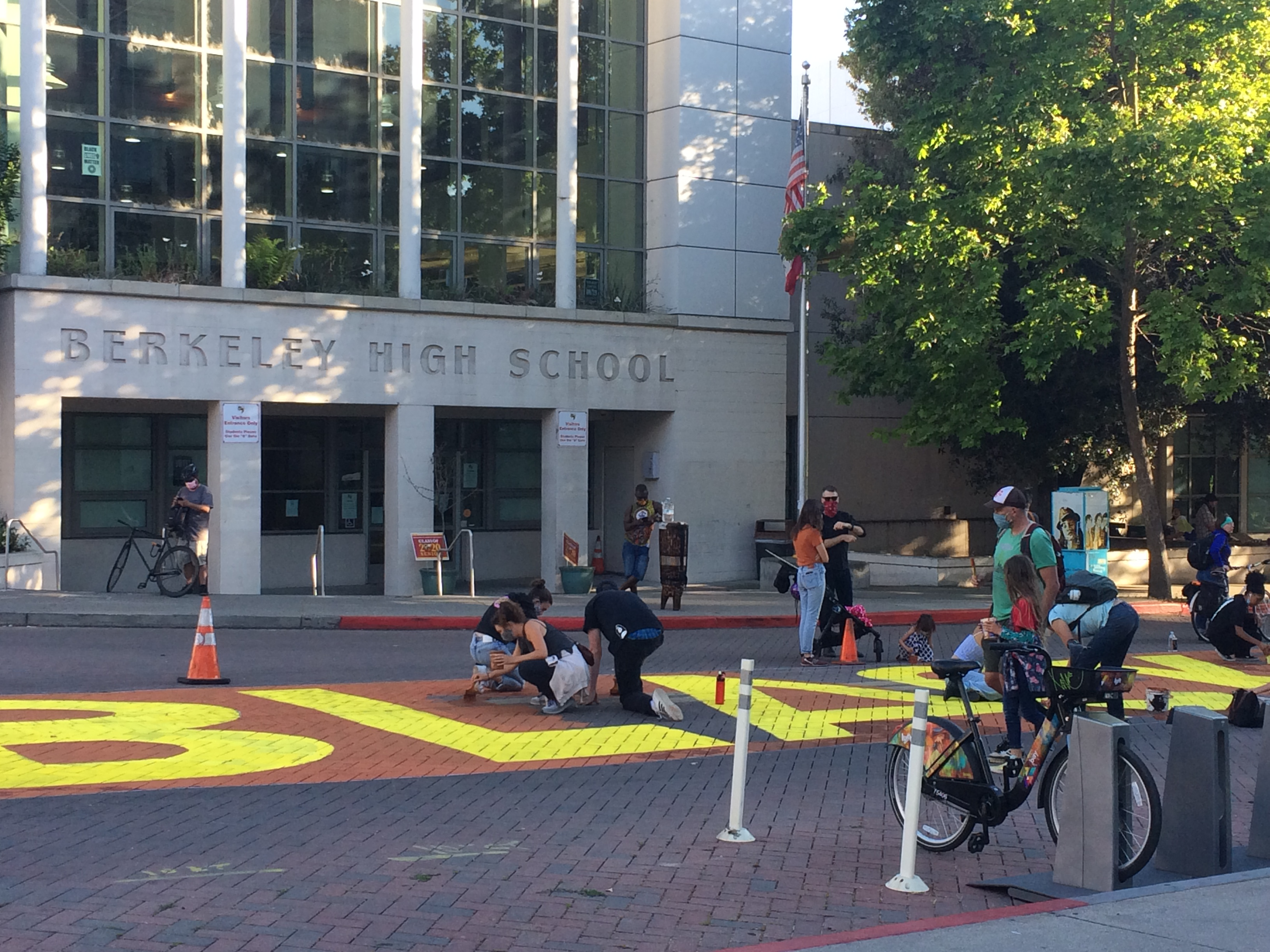
Berkeley High School, Berkeley, California

- Berkeley – On June 9, in response to the Oakland mural, the city council of nearby Berkeley approved painting "Black Lives Matter" on a street in front of the city hall, after students painted a similar street mural in front of Berkeley High School.
- Calaveras and Tuolumne counties – On June 9, "Black Lives Matter!" was found painted onto a bridge spanning the Middle Fork Stanislaus River in a remote area. By June 13, it had been defaced to read "All Lives Matter!"
- La Jolla – On June 14, faculty members from the UCSD Visual Arts Department began discussing a Black Lives Matter mural. On June 15, students, along with 3B Collective, faculty, and students, painted a 110-foot-long "Black Lives Matter" in yellow paint.
- Fresno – On June 18, "Black Lives Matter" was painted in yellow along P Street in front of Fresno City Hall and the city council declared the day "Black Lives Matter Day".
- Los Angeles – On August 31, 2020, the City of Los Angeles completed its first official and permanent All Black Lives Matter on-street public art mural by Luckie Alexander in the center lane of Hollywood Boulevard on the Hollywood Walk of Fame, replacing an earlier unofficial All Black Lives Matter on-street mural and paying tribute to transgender people of color. The earlier mural was painted by volunteers on June 13, 2020, at the same site in conjunction with the June 14, 2020, All Black Lives Matter march.
- Martinez – On July 5, the words "Black Lives Matter" were painted in front of the Contra Costa County courthouse in downtown Martinez. The mural was defaced the day it was painted and was never restored.
- Oakland – On June 7, residents and community groups painted "Black Lives Matter" along three blocks of 15th Street in downtown Oakland.
- Oakland – On July 1, The Queer Healing Arts Center, 14 artists and over 250 community members - under the direction and design of the Queer Healing Arts Center's founder artivist Kin Folkz, artist Nkosi Smith and Imani Smith - painted a powerful mural in honor of Black Trans and Queer Lives that reads "ALL BLACK TRANS, QUEER, NON-BINARY, WOMEN, DISABLED, IMPRISONED LIVES MATTER" along seven blocks of Bellevue Ave/Lakeside Park Road at Lake Merritt (from Fairyland to the Lake Merritt Boathouse) in downtown Oakland.
- Palo Alto – On June 30, up to 16 Bay Area artists will paint a temporary "Black Lives Matter" mural along Hamilton Avenue in front of city hall.
- Richmond – More than 200 community members painted "Black Lives Matter" in yellow along Nevin Avenue in front of the city hall, with each letter measuring 10 by 11 feet (3.0 m × 3.4 m).
- Sacramento – "Black Lives Matter!" was painted on Capitol Mall.
- San Francisco – The Bay Area Mural Program painted a three-block-long "Black Lives Matter" in yellow along Fulton Street (between Webster to Octavia) in the Fillmore District, leading up to San Francisco City Hall.
- San Jose – On July 4, an anonymous resident painted "Black Lives Matter" across three blocks of East Empire Street as part of an organized protest against the 2016 killing of Anthony Nunez by police. The city did not have a process for approving street murals.
- San Leandro – July 18-19
- Stockton – On June 19, volunteers from across Northern California painted "Black Lives Matter" in the pan-African colors along a street in front of Victory Park.
- Santa Cruz

== Colorado ==
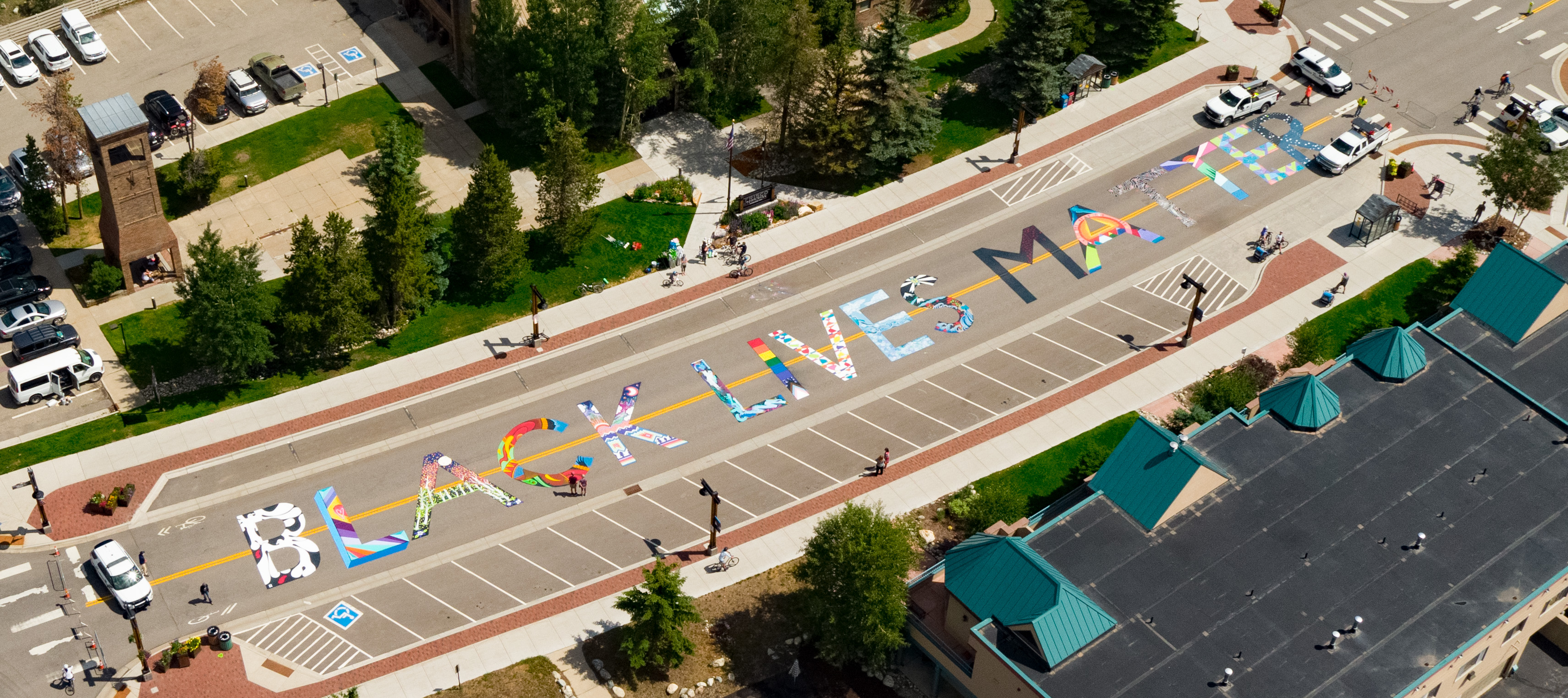
Frisco Colorado

- Denver – On June 12, hundreds of volunteers painted "Black Lives Matter" and "Remember This Time" along Broadway between the Colorado State Capitol and the City and County Building.

== Connecticut ==
- Bridgeport – On June 19, "Black Lives Matter" was painted in yellow along Broad Street downtown.
- New Haven – On September 19, "Black Lives Matter" was painted in yellow on Basset Street, and on October 3 on Temple Street.

== Florida ==
- Orlando – On June 25, "Black Lives Matter" was painted in Pan-African colors on Rosalind Avenue.
- St. Petersburg – On June 19, "Black Lives Matter" was painted on the street in front of the Dr. Carter G. Woodson African American Museum.
- Tallahassee – On July 8, "Black Lives Matter" was painted at the intersection of Gaines Street and on Railroad Avenue.

== Georgia ==
- Atlanta – Overnight on June 19, artists painted "Black Lives Matter" in yellow along the Eastside Trail.

== Illinois ==
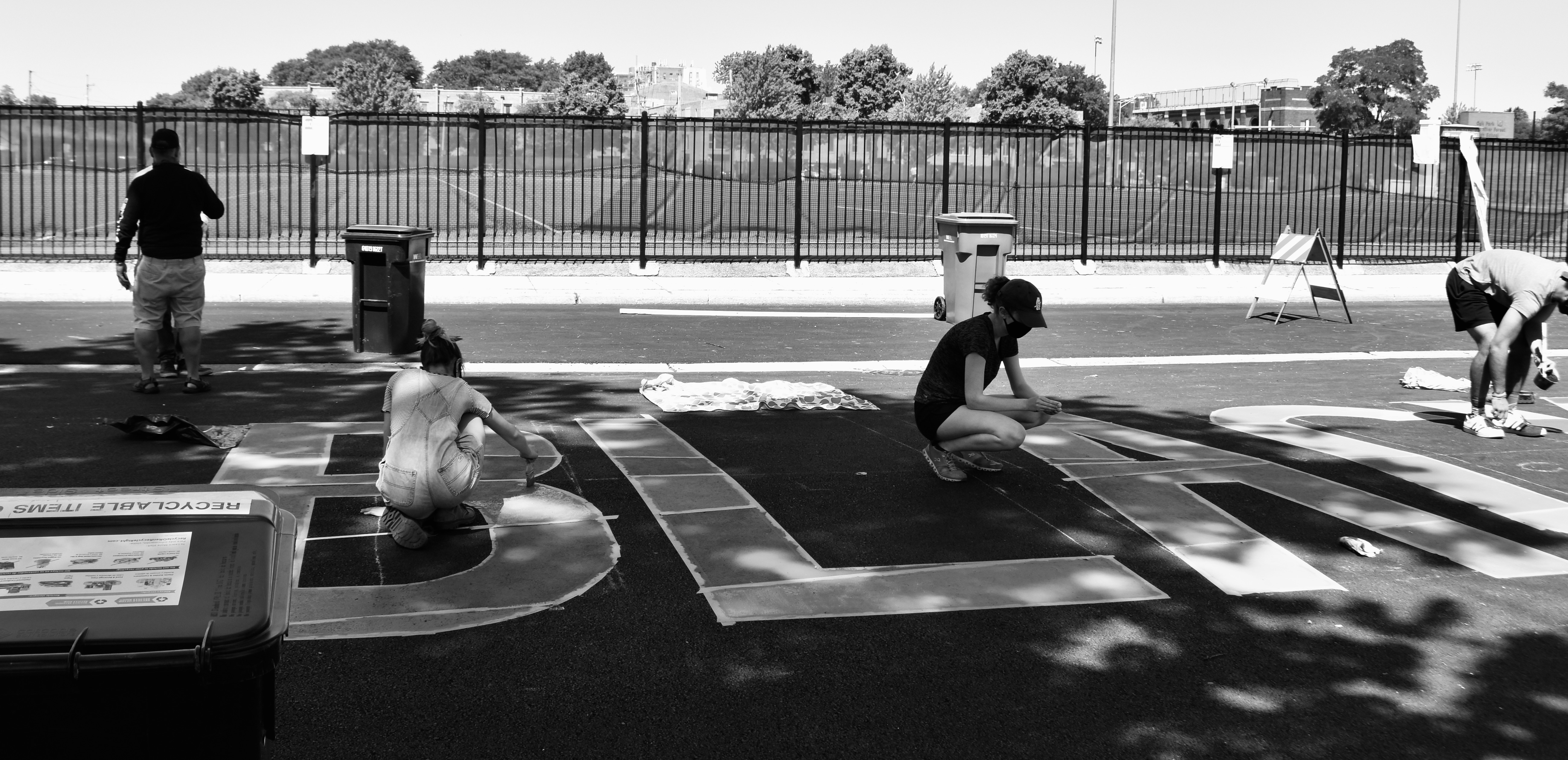
Oak Park, Illinois

- Chicago – Catalpa Avenue in the Andersonville neighbourhood was painted with BLACK TRANS LIVES MATTER by 22 artists, it was organised by Andersonville Chamber of Commerce and Ald. Andre Vasquez.
- Evanston — Over the July 4 long weekend 2020, the public high school's girls and boys basketball teams received city approval for the mural at right. It covers three city blocks on Dodge Avenue in front of the high school — 1700 Dodge. See photos. By the morning of the second day of its existence, someone had defaced it with white paint likely thrown from a vehicle at a high speed. It remains intact through June 30, 2021.
- Oak Park – From June 24 to 27, "Black Lives Matter" will be painted in multiple colors measuring 130 by 12 feet (39.6 m × 3.7 m) along Scoville Avenue.

== Indiana ==
- Indianapolis – According to the Indianapolis Star, Indy10 Black Lives Matter coordinated a mural painting event with other community organizations, activists, and artists from August 1 to 2, 2020. The street mural was permitted by the Indianapolis City-County Council in a resolution against racism. Each letter or symbol in the street mural was painted by a single Black artist. The street mural was painted on Indiana Avenue, between the Indianapolis Urban League and Madam Walker Legacy Center. The mural was defaced on August 9, 2020.

== Maryland ==
- Baltimore – On June 12, protesters painted "Defund the Police" on Gay Street in front of Baltimore City Hall. On June 21, residents painted "Black Lives Matter" in red along South Linwood Avenue at Patterson Park.
- Cambridge – On June 16, local artists began painting "Black Lives Matter" along Race Street near the Harriet Tubman Museum. The mural is expected to last about a year.
- Salisbury – "Black Lives Matter" was painted in blue, yellow, and green (the City of Salisbury's colors) along a Broad Street sidewalk. Broad Street was renamed to Black Lives Matter Boulevard on June 19.

== Massachusetts ==
- Springfield

== Michigan ==
- Benton Harbor – Volunteers painted a "Black Lives Matter" mural on Colfax Avenue in front of Benton Harbor High School on August 8 and unveiled it on August 9.
- Detroit – On June 17, local artists and students painted "Power to the People" in black and white along Woodward Avenue.
- Flint – On June 14, several community organizations painted "Black Lives Matter!" on Martin Luther King Jr. Avenue.
- Jackson – On June 14, "Black Lives Matter" was painted in Pan-African colors along High Street near Elnora Moorman Plaza and a house listed in The Negro Motorist Green Book. "Black Lives Matter" was also painted in yellow along West Washington Avenue.
- Kalamazoo – On June 19, "Black Lives Matter" was painted along the center turn lane of Rose Street.
- Lansing – A local activist painted "Black Lives Matter" in 4-foot-tall (1.2 m), yellow and white lettering along Capitol Avenue.

== Minnesota ==
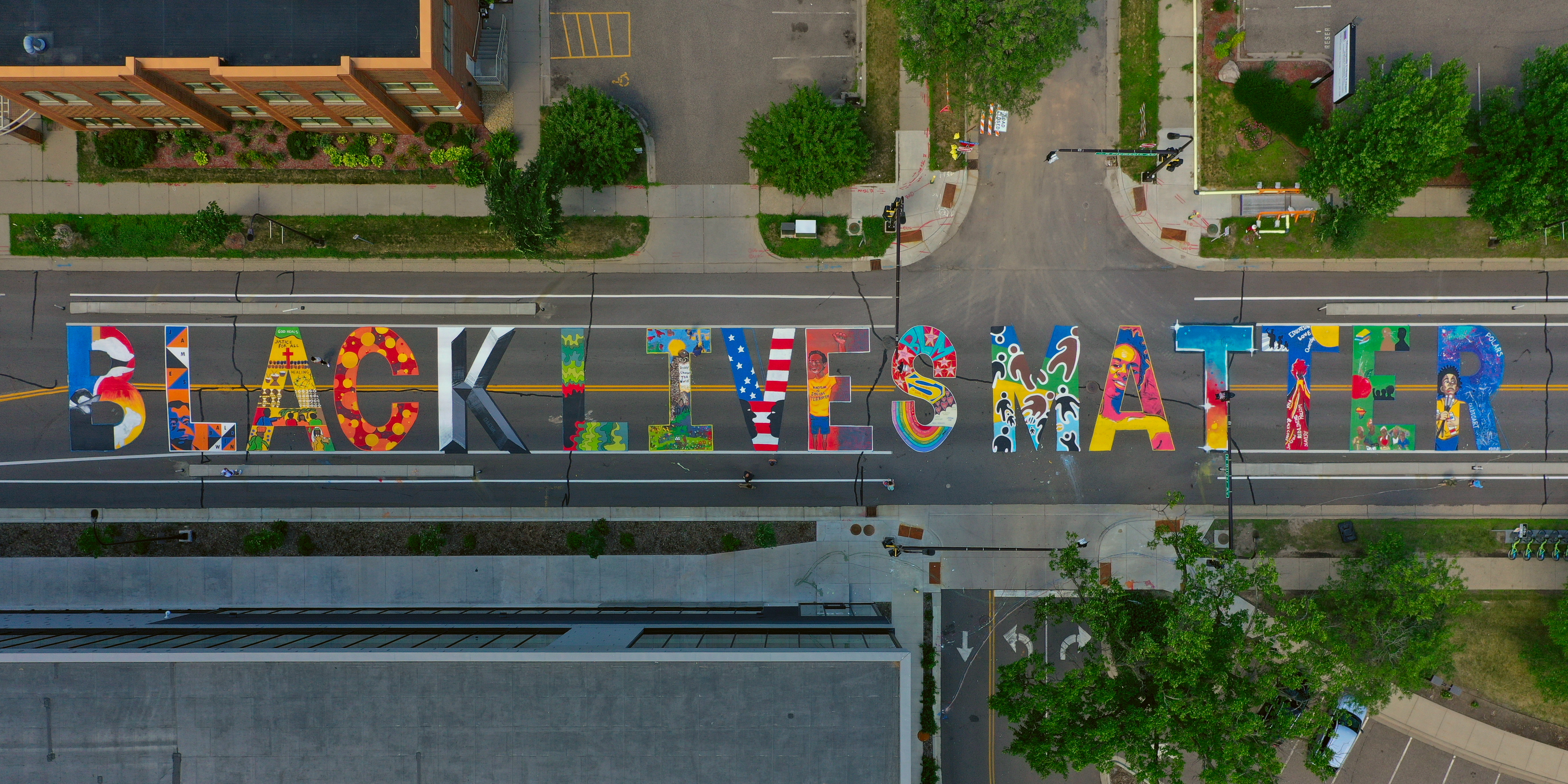
Minneapolis

- Minneapolis – On July 18, the Minnesota African American Heritage Museum and Gallery coordinated the painting of "Black Lives Matter" in 24-foot (7.3 m)-high letters on the street outside the museum, along Plymouth Avenue North between Newton and Penn avenues. 16 artists participated, each designing one letter.

== Mississippi ==
- Hattiesburg – On June 12, residents painted "Black Lives Matter" along Mobile Street using temporary yellow paint.
- Moss Point – On June 20, officials painted "Black Lives Matter" and the movement's fist logo on the street in front of city hall.

== Missouri ==
- Florissant – From June 19 to 21, activists attempted three times to paint "Black Lives Matter" in 12-foot-tall (3.7 m) white lettering along North Lindbergh Boulevard in front of the police department, but the city painted over the mural and arrested two activists for violating a local ordinance against street painting.
- Kansas City – On September 5, six massive "Black Lives Matter" murals were painted across the city. Each mural was designed by a Black artist as part of a project called KC Art on the Block, is highly detailed, and covers the street for the length of at least one block. USA Today said it "may be the largest project of its kind", totaling a span of 2,000 feet (610 m). Some were enhanced in response to vandalism.

== New Jersey ==
- Atlantic City – In September it was agreed the paint a mural at the city's Civil Right Park and not the Boardwalk.
- Elizabeth – On August 2, a "Black Lives Matter" mural at MLK Plaza across from City Hall was dedicated, with George Floyd's brother, Terrence Floyd, and Eric Garner's mother, Gwendolyn Carr, in attendance.
- Highland Park – On June 18, volunteers painted "Black Lives Matter" on South 5th Avenue across from the police and fire departments and borough hall.
- Newark – On June 27, a stretch of Halsey Street was painted with "Black Lives Matter".
- Orange Township – Mayor Dwayne D. Warren, Esq., Councilwoman-at-Large Adrienne Wooten and South Ward Councilwoman Jamie Summers-Johnson participated with the community to unveil its Black Lives Matter mural to the public. Painted on Main Street on Aug. 8, the mural has been receiving rave reviews.
- East Orange – On April 25, 2021, a 9,000-square-foot (840 m^{2}) mural was unveiled at the historic Manufacturers Village; led by artist Malcolm Rolling, sixteen local artists each designed a letter using the "Marsha" typeface by Tré Seals, which honors Marsha P. Johnson.

== New York ==
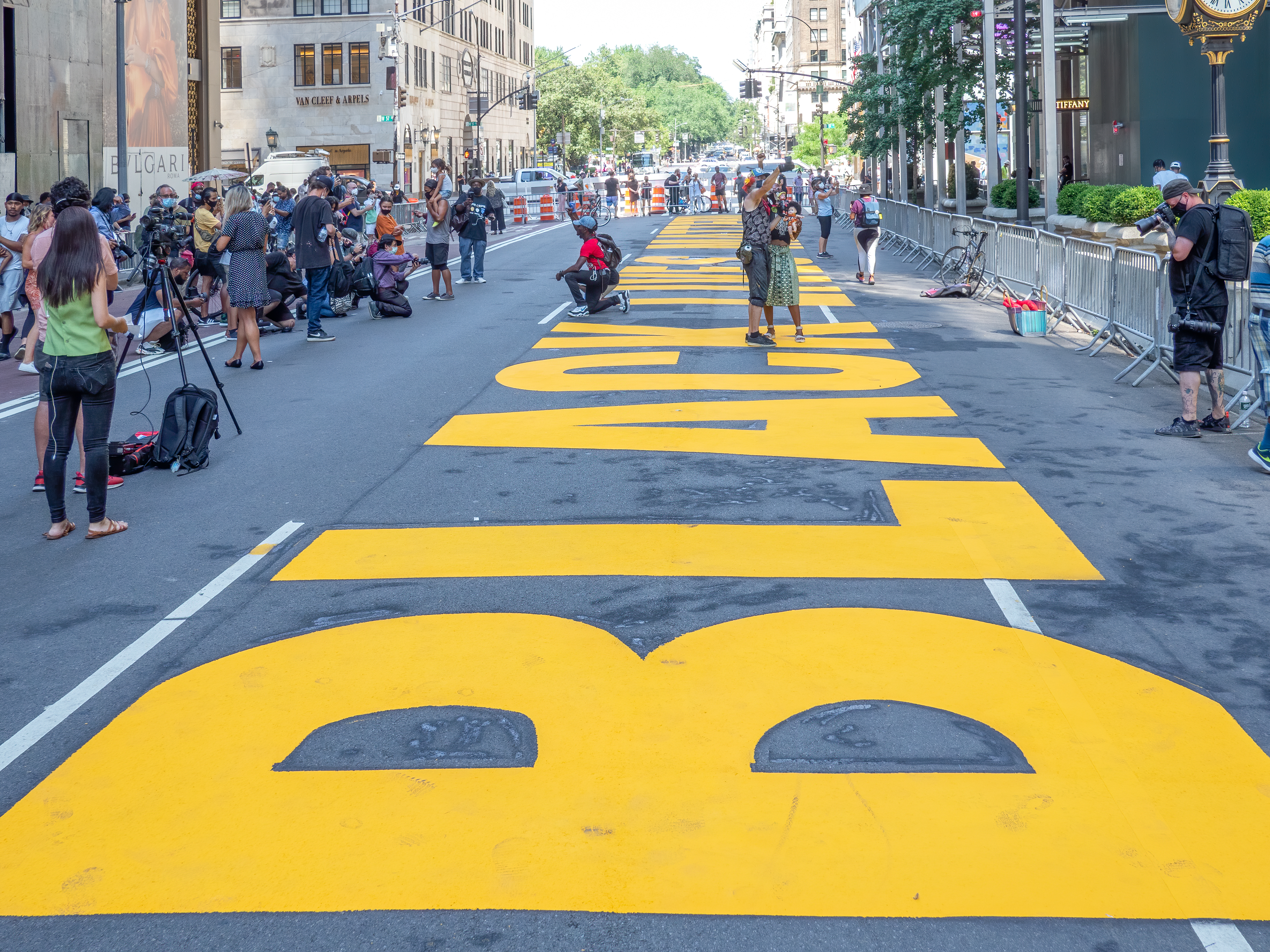
Manhattan, New York City

- Albany – A community advocacy group painted "Black Lives Matter" in yellow along Lark Street, one of the city's busiest streets. Albany Common Council renamed Livingston Park to Black Lives Matter Park.
- Buffalo – A proposed resolution in Buffalo Common Council would rename Fillmore Avenue to "Black Lives Matter Way". D'Youville College commissioned mural named "Black Matter is Life" be painted by Maxx Moses on their campus off of Porter Avenue.
- Cortland, NY - On June 29, 2020, a mural was painted downtown on Main Street. - https://cortlandvoice.com/2020/06/30/black-lives-matter-mural-painted-in-downtown-cortland-videos-photos-included/.
- New York City – multiple street murals were painted (see Black Lives Matter art in New York City)
- Nyack – On June 19, "Black Lives Matter" and the movement's fist logo were painted in the pan-African colors in tempera paint along Main Street.
- Oswego – On June 14, the State University of New York at Oswego painted "Black Lives Matter" in yellow in front of Sheldon Hall.
- Rochester – On June 11, volunteers painted "Black Lives Matter" along Court Street in blue, 37 1/2-foot-tall (11.4 m) lettering with the Black Lives Matter movement's fist logo on one end and Rochester's Flower City logo on the other end.
- Schenectady – On June 23, "Black Lives Matter" was painted in yellow along Jay Street in front of the city hall.
- Syracuse – A local attorney obtained a permit to paint "Black Lives Matter" on a street in front of the city hall.

== North Carolina ==
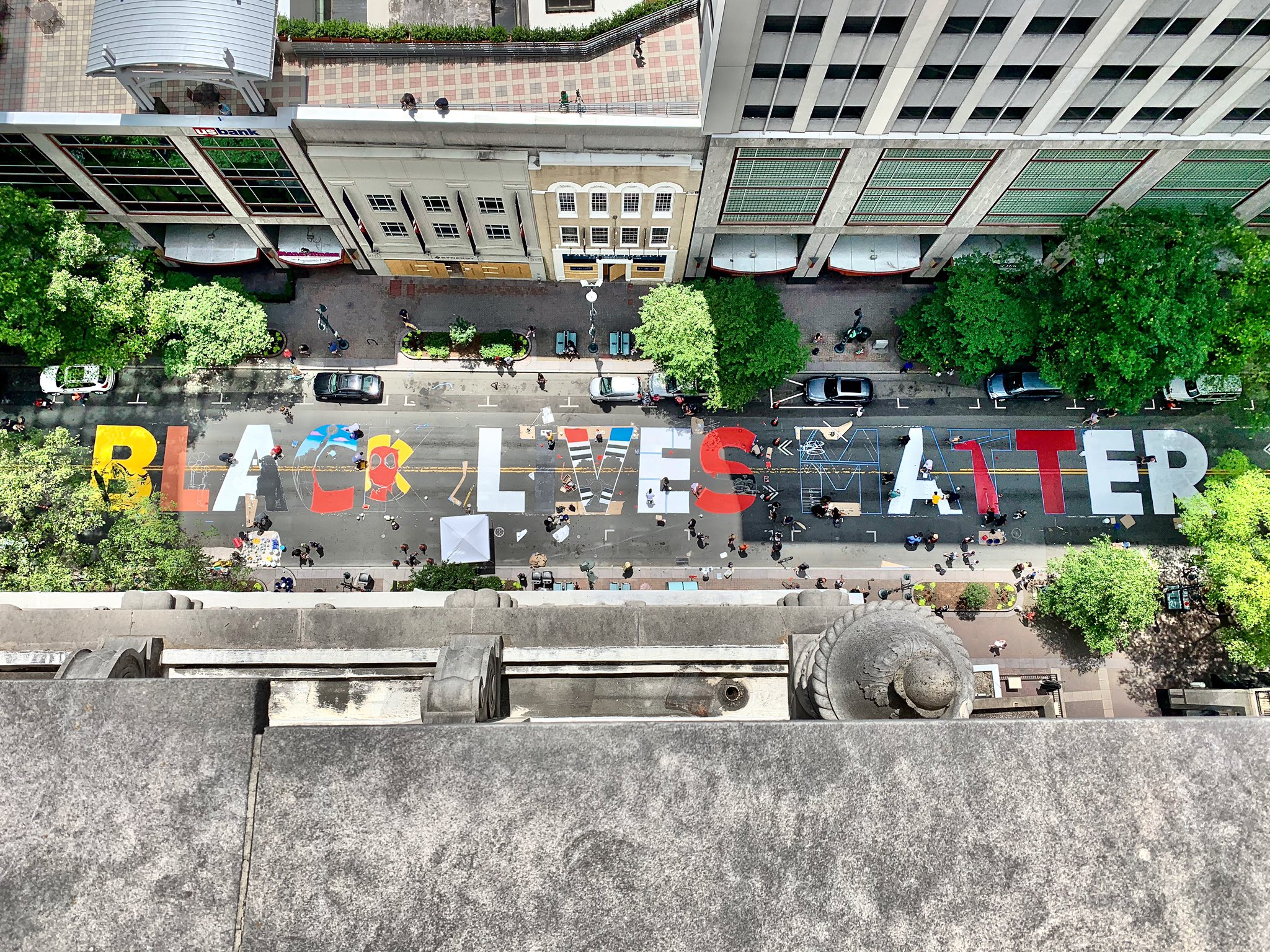
Charlotte, North Carolina

- Asheville – On June 21, protesters painted "Defund the Police" in yellow along Spruce Street in front of the police department. On June 22, the city washed away the mural.
- Charlotte – On June 9, "Black Lives Matter" was painted on South Tryon Street. By June 12, it had been vandalized with skid marks. On November 10, the city council voted 10–1 to reopen the street even though more businesses were benefitting from the mural being there than losing money from the street being closed.
- Elizabeth City – There is a "Black Lives Matter" mural painted on East Colonial Avenue. This mural was painted in honor of Andrew Brown Jr., who was shot and killed by a Pasquotank County Sheriff's deputy.
- Fayetteville "Black Lives Do Matter" and "End Racism Now" will be painted on the street encircling the Market House.
- Raleigh – A dozen volunteers painted "End Racism Now" in yellow on a street near the Contemporary Art Museum of Raleigh.

== Ohio ==
- Akron – On June 18, "Black Lives Matter" was painted with permanent paint along Howard Street, near the site of the fatal shooting of a recent high school graduate, Na'Kia Crawford, the previous Sunday.
- Cincinnati – Local artists painted "Black Lives Matter!" on Plum Street in front of Cincinnati City Hall. Seventeen local artists were each assigned a letter and up to seven assistants. Based on a Poem written by Alandes Powell the mural was designed and painted in less than five days. Powell raised over $150,000 in less than five days. The Urban League of Greater Southwestern Ohio acted as the fiscal agent, the proceeds went to a group of Black Artist, Black Art Speaks which was co-founded by Alandes Powell and a group of 17 Artist. The mural has been updated each year and will be fully repainted in 2025.
- Cleveland – On June 20, local artists painted "Black Lives Matter" temporarily along East 93rd Street as part of the Elevate the East art project.

== Oklahoma ==
- Oklahoma City – "Black Voices" and "Black Lives Matter" were painted on streets in Downtown and Northeast Oklahoma City, respectively.
- Tulsa – Overnight on June 19, "Black Lives Matter" was painted in yellow along Greenwood Avenue in the Greenwood District, on the site of the Tulsa Race Massacre. It was removed by the city on October 6.

== Oregon ==
- Eugene – On June 18, local artists with the Eugene BIPOC Art Collective painted "Black Lives Matter" in yellow lettering with black handprints along 8th Avenue downtown in front of the Wayne Lyman Morse United States Courthouse. That night, the mural was defaced with tire tracks. Over the following days a suspect was identified, and the artists and the community added to the mural, incorporating the tracks into the design by covering them with handprints of all colors of the rainbow.
- Portland – On June 18, "Black Lives Matter" was painted on North Edison Street by the neighborhood. Inside the letters detailed stories about minority history in the area were included, starting the first black visitor from the Lewis and Clark expedition in 1800, ending with stories from 2018. It was vandalized on July 21.

== Pennsylvania ==
- Philadelphia – A pastor had "End Racism Now" painted in yellow on a street in the Fishtown neighborhood. City crews tried unsuccessfully to remove it.

== South Carolina ==
- Spartanburg – On June 20, volunteers painted "Black Lives Matter" along West Broad Street.

== Tennessee ==
- Chattanooga – On June 29, volunteers painted "Black Lives Matter" on Dr. Martin Luther King Blvd in front of the Bessie Smith Cultural Center.

== Texas ==
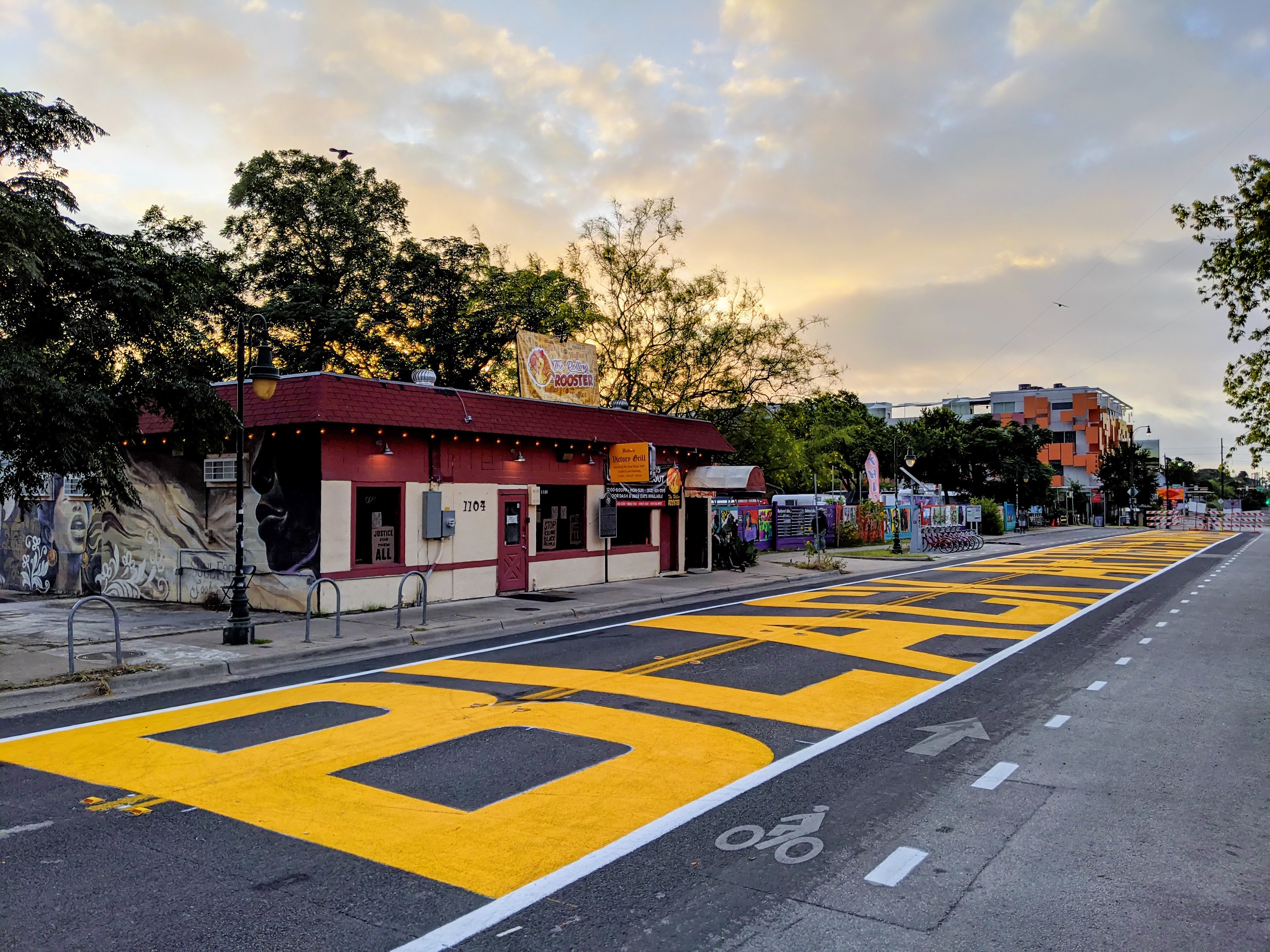
Austin

- Austin – "Black Austin Matters" was painted in yellow along Congress Avenue. The Austin Justice Coalition painted "Black Artists Matter" in yellow along East 11th Street in the Central East Austin neighborhood.
- Dallas – "Black Lives Matter" was painted across the plaza in front of Dallas City Hall.
- Houston – On June 19, "Black Towns Matter" was painted in red and yellow lettering along Link Road in Independence Heights, the first city incorporated by African-Americans in Texas.
- Prairie View – On June 19, Prairie View A&M University students painted a permanent "Black Lives Matter" street mural along Sandra Bland Parkway.

== Utah ==
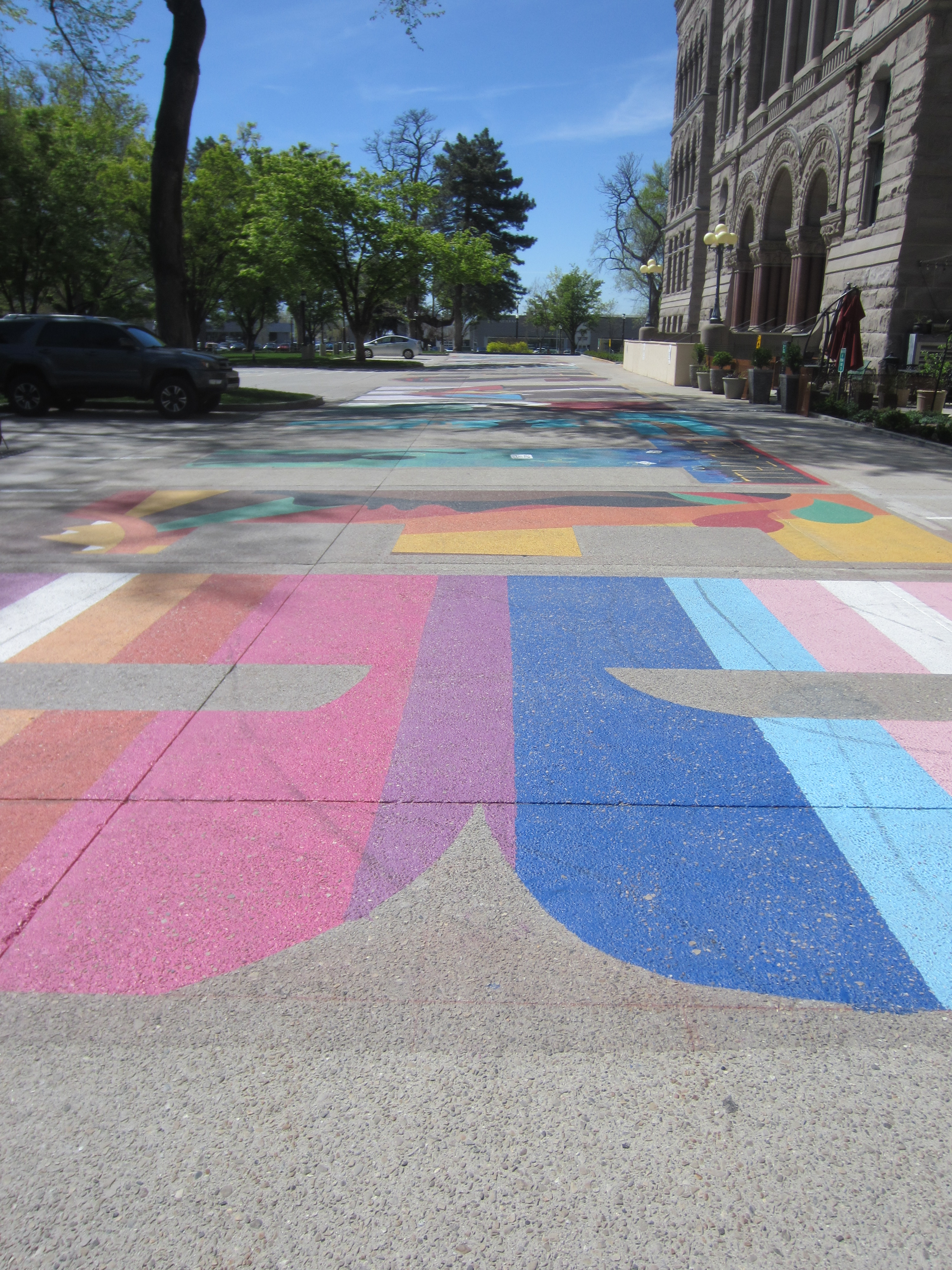
Mural in Salt Lake City, Utah, 2021

- Salt Lake City

== Vermont ==
- Montpelier – On June 13, hundreds of volunteers painted "Black Lives Matter" in yellow on the street in front of the Vermont State House. The mural was vandalized the following day.

== Virginia ==
- Harrisonburg – On September 23, the Black Student Alliance of Eastern Mennonite University unveiled its 114-foot-long "Black Lives Matter" mural painted in yellow street paint at the entrance of the University Commons.

== Washington ==
- Seattle – Local artists painted a colorful Black Lives Matter street mural in the Capitol Hill Autonomous Zone. The city agreed to make it permanent that September. In 2021, a second mural was painted outside Seattle City Hall.

== Wisconsin ==
- Madison – On June 8, protesters painted "Defund Police" in yellow along Martin Luther King Junior Boulevard downtown.
- Milwaukee – On June 19, "Black Lives Matter" was painted in yellow along North Martin Luther King Junior Drive adjacent to a police station in the Harambee neighborhood. Much of the mural washed away in a thunderstorm the following day.

== Other countries ==
Toronto

Similar street murals have been painted outside the United States:

- Australia – In Brunswick, Victoria, residents painted "Black Lives Matter" in black against a green background on Florence Street.
- Canada – In Toronto, protesters painted "Defund the Police" in hot pink along College Street outside Toronto Police Service headquarters.
- United Kingdom – In Greenwich, Greenwich London Borough Council painted "Black Lives Matter" across General Gordon Square.

== See also ==
- 2020–2021 United States racial unrest
- George Floyd and Anti-racist Street Art Database
- Black Lives Matter Memorial Fence
