= SDDC =

SDDC may stand for:

- China Village Electrification Program (Song Dian Dao Cun)
- Single-device data correction
- Software-defined data center
- Surface Deployment and Distribution Command
- ShutdownDC, an activist group from Washington, DC
