= Black Lives Matter Plaza =

Section of 16th Street in Washington, D.C., designated in June 2020

- Black Lives Matter Plaza Northwest
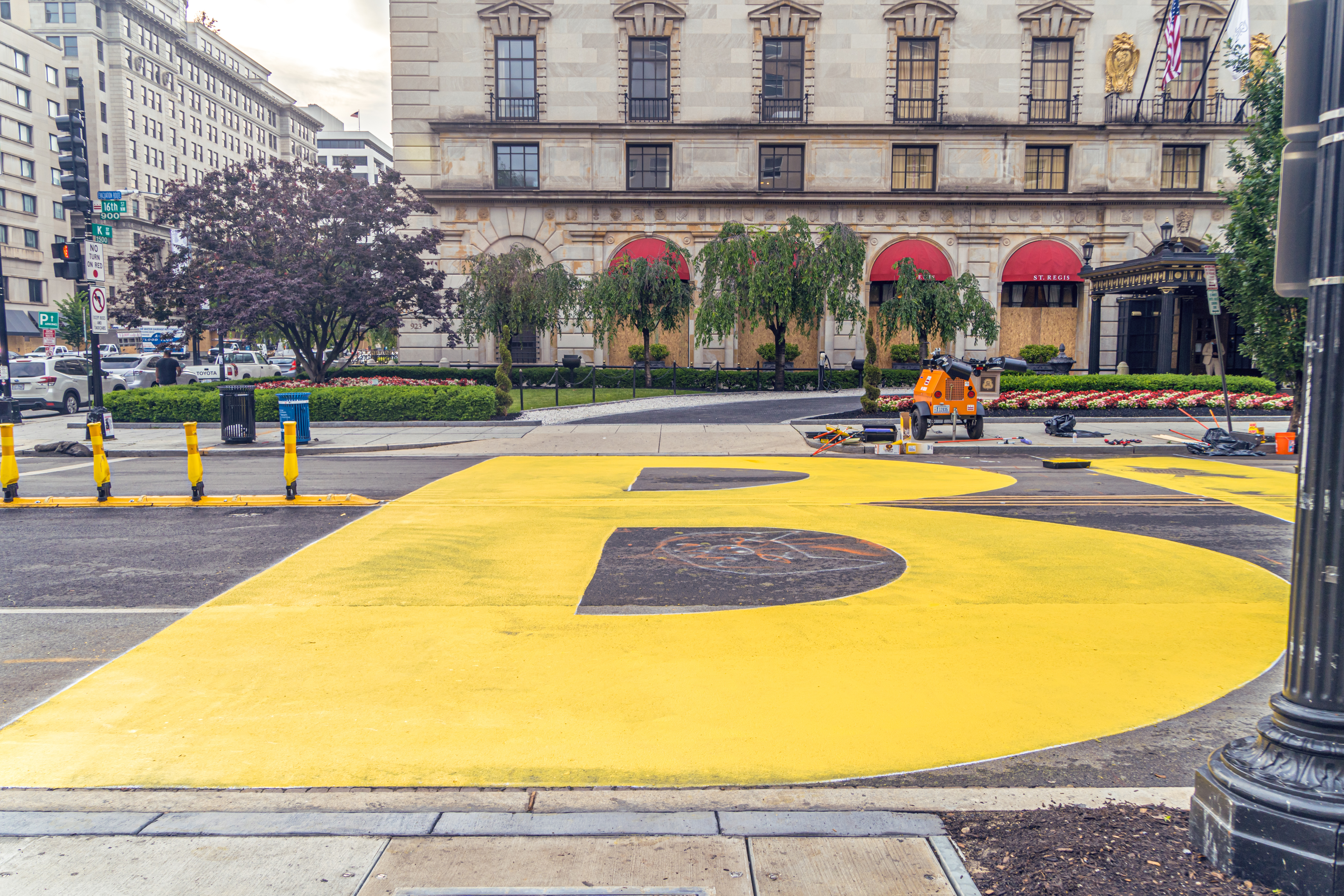
- The letter "B" in the mural reading "Black Lives Matter" painted in June 2020
- Namesake: Black Lives Matter
- Maintained by: DDOT
- Location: Downtown Washington, D.C.
- Postal code: 20006
- Nearest metro station: McPherson Square
- Coordinates: 38°54′3.506″N 77°2′11.548″W
- North end: US 29 (K Street, NW)
- South end: H Street, NW at Lafayette Square of President's Park

Construction
- Commissioned: June 5, 2020
- Completion: October 28, 2021

Black Lives Matter Plaza (officially Black Lives Matter Plaza Northwest) was a two-block-long pedestrian section of 16th Street NW in downtown Washington, D.C. The plaza was renamed by Mayor Muriel Bowser on June 5, 2020, after the D.C. Department of Public Works painted the words "Black Lives Matter" in yellow, 35-foot-tall (11 m) capital letters, along with the D.C. flag, during the series of George Floyd protests taking place in the city. The plaza's mural inspired similar Black Lives Matter street murals across the U.S.

The plaza was removed in March 2025 amid policies against diversity, equity, and inclusion (DEI) enforced by the second Trump administration, after Republican congressman Andrew Clyde demanded its removal and renaming as a condition of future federal funding for the city.

== History ==
During 2020's George Floyd Protests in D.C., daily protests occurred around Lafayette Square near the White House. On June 1, 2020, local police departments violently cleared mostly peaceful protestors from the square while President Donald Trump walked across the park for a photo op at St. John's Church. Trump had just given a speech in the Rose Garden against the protests, which he described as violent, and wanted to speak at St. John's Church because it had been damaged during protests the day before. The use of force against peaceful protesters sparked criticism, including by the church's bishop, U.S. senators, and D.C. Mayor Muriel Bowser. In response to this treatment of protestors, Bowser quickly commissioned a "Black Lives Matter" mural near the park.

=== Mural creation ===
On June 5, 2020, the D.C. Department of Public Works painted the words "Black Lives Matter" in 35-foot-tall (11 m) yellow capital letters on 16th Street NW on the north of Lafayette Square, part of President's Park near the White House, with the assistance of the MuralsDC program of the Department of Public Works. The D.C. flag accompanied the text. Painting began at 3 a.m. and lasted until noon. Keyonna Jones, one of the seven artists who painted the mural, said, "The symbolism is huge. We are saying it loud. We are here. Maybe you didn’t hear us before. Maybe you got confused. But the message is clear. Black lives matter, period."

On the same date, Mayor Muriel Bowser announced that part of the street outside of the White House had been officially renamed to Black Lives Matter Plaza posted with a street sign. When announcing the renaming, she said, "Breonna Taylor, on your birthday, let us stand with determination." In a press conference, she explained, "There are people who are craving to be heard and to be seen and to have their humanity recognized. We had the opportunity to send that message loud and clear on a very important street in our city." Trump shared Twitter posts that night calling Bowser unqualified to be D.C.'s mayor, and Bowser posted a video of the mural later that night, writing "We turned on the night light for him so he dreams about #BlackLivesMatter Plaza".

=== Maintenance and oversight ===
The naming of the street has been seen by many as not only a reaction to the protests but part of it. The mural inspired other Black Lives Matter street murals across the U.S. Similar murals were painted within a day in other locations, and by 2025, over 150 murals saying "Black Lives Matter" remained.

Mayor Bowser's decision to rename the segment of 16th Street NW as a public gathering place, or plaza, followed DC precedent for the commemorative renaming of city streets, under the Code of the District of Columbia. In September 2020, according to WUSA9, the Federal Highway Administration, Mayor Bowser's office, and area businesses were engaged in talks about removing the lettering and street sign, although no action transpired from the discussions. In October 2020, the DC City Council voted to keep the name permanently.

In May 2021, Mayor Bowser announced that the mural would undergo a refurbishment to make it a permanent installation, and add "all the things that you expect an iconic art installation". She described the mural as "a very affirming message that not only our residents needed to hear, but people around the world needed to hear."

In October 2021, the street was reopened as a permanent installation featuring similar yellow lettering and a permanent concrete plaza. Unlike the original installation, which was closed to traffic, the permanent plaza includes one lane of traffic in each direction separated by a 14-foot (4.3 m) pedestrian island in the center. Total construction costs were estimated at $7.8 million.

== Location ==
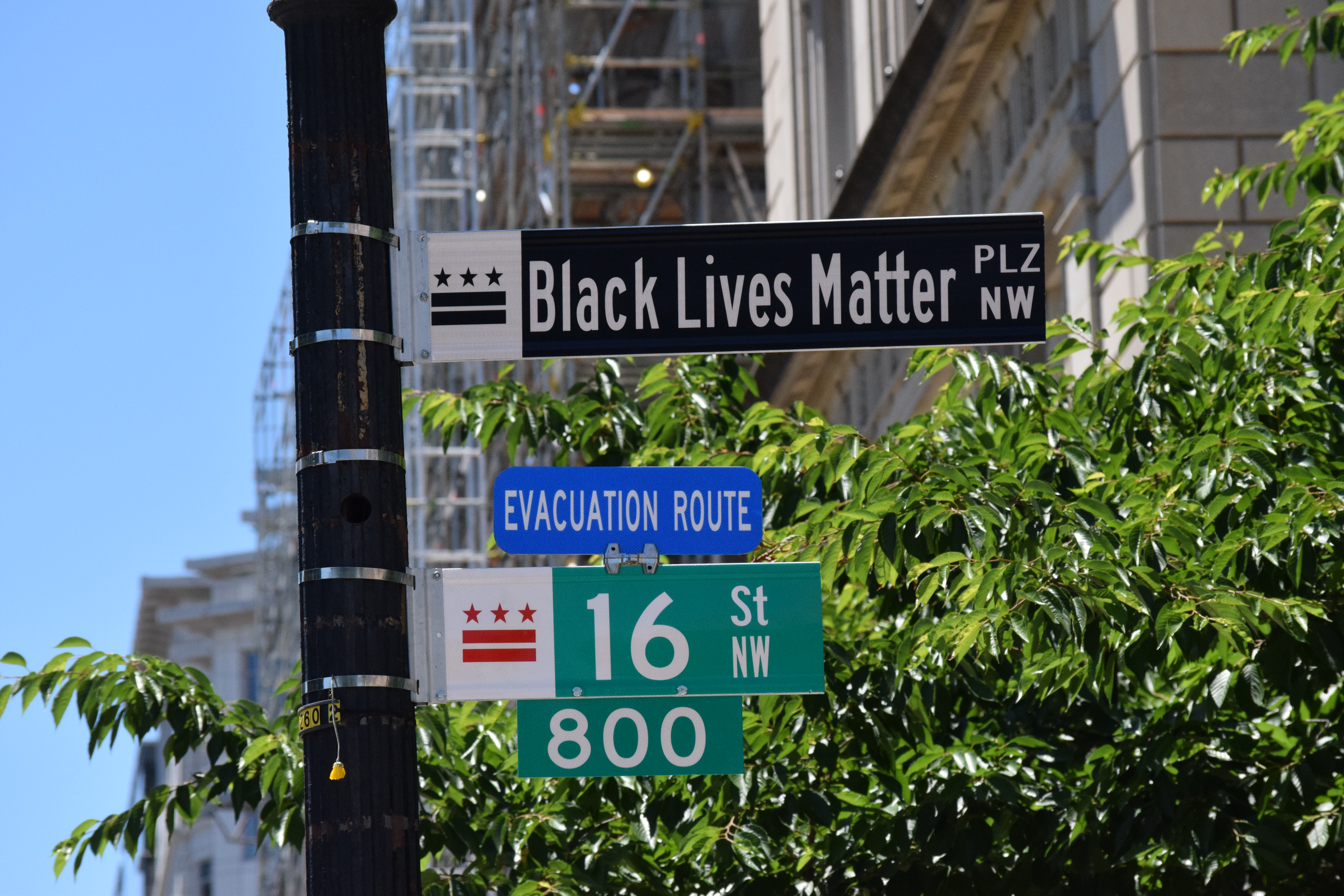
Black Lives Matter Plaza Street Sign. The signs are black with white lettering. This style of sign is unique in DC to Black Lives Matter Plaza.

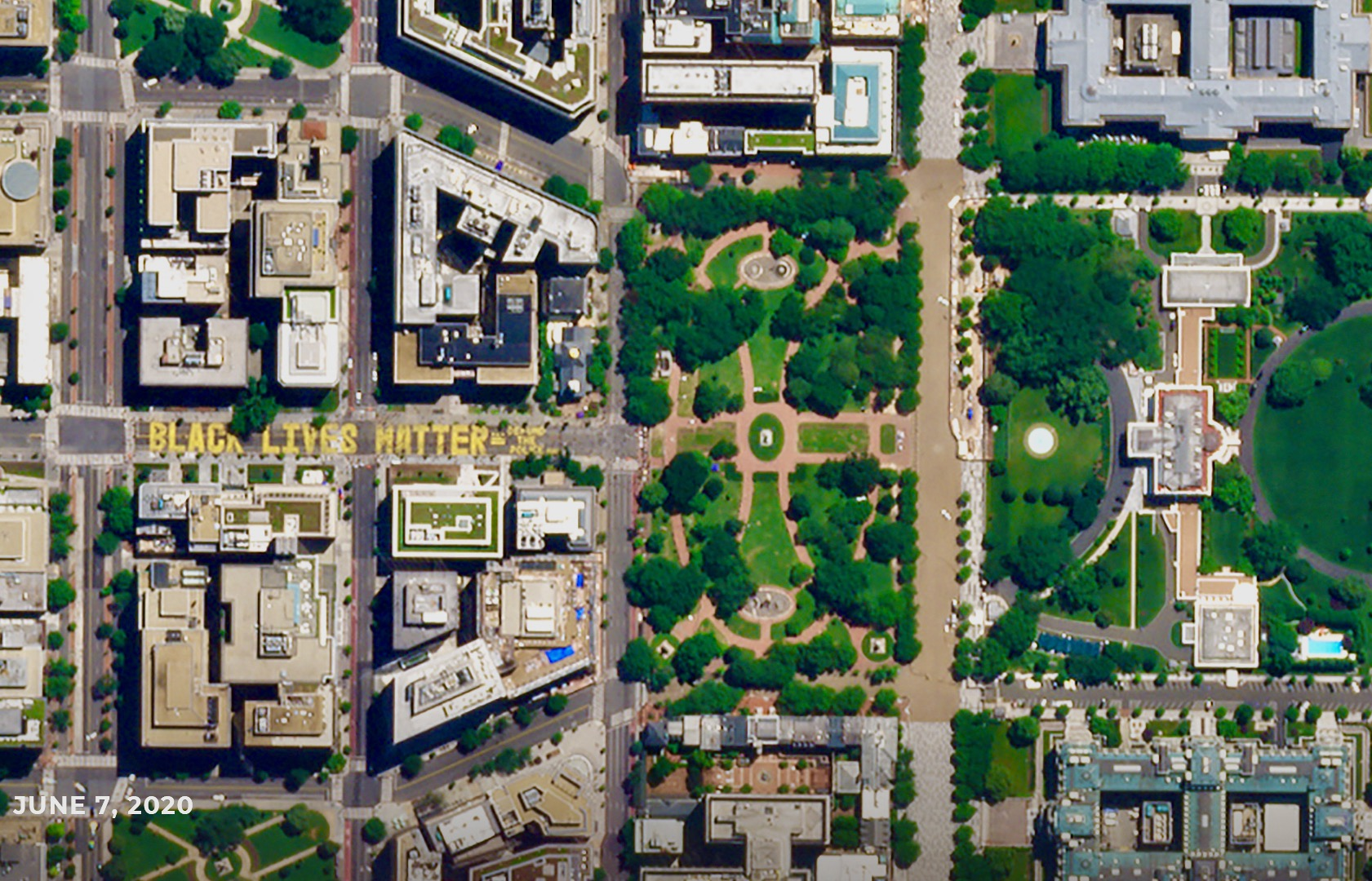
Black Lives Matter Plaza in Washington, D.C., as seen from space on June 8, 2020

The plaza is a two-block-long section of 16th Street NW, south of K St NW, extending through I St, and north of H Street NW on the north side of President's Park on the south side of the Downtown neighborhood in Northwest D.C. Vehicular entry to the temporary installation was blocked by barricades on the right-hand side of the street, though emergency vehicles had access on the left side. After the completion of the permanent installation in October 2021, vehicular entry has been restored.

== Reaction ==
=== Park police ===
The United States Park Police reacted to the public gatherers by erecting a temporary seven-foot-tall (2.1 m) chain-link security barrier on the north boundary of the park, which was used to post messages by the protesters.

=== Community response ===
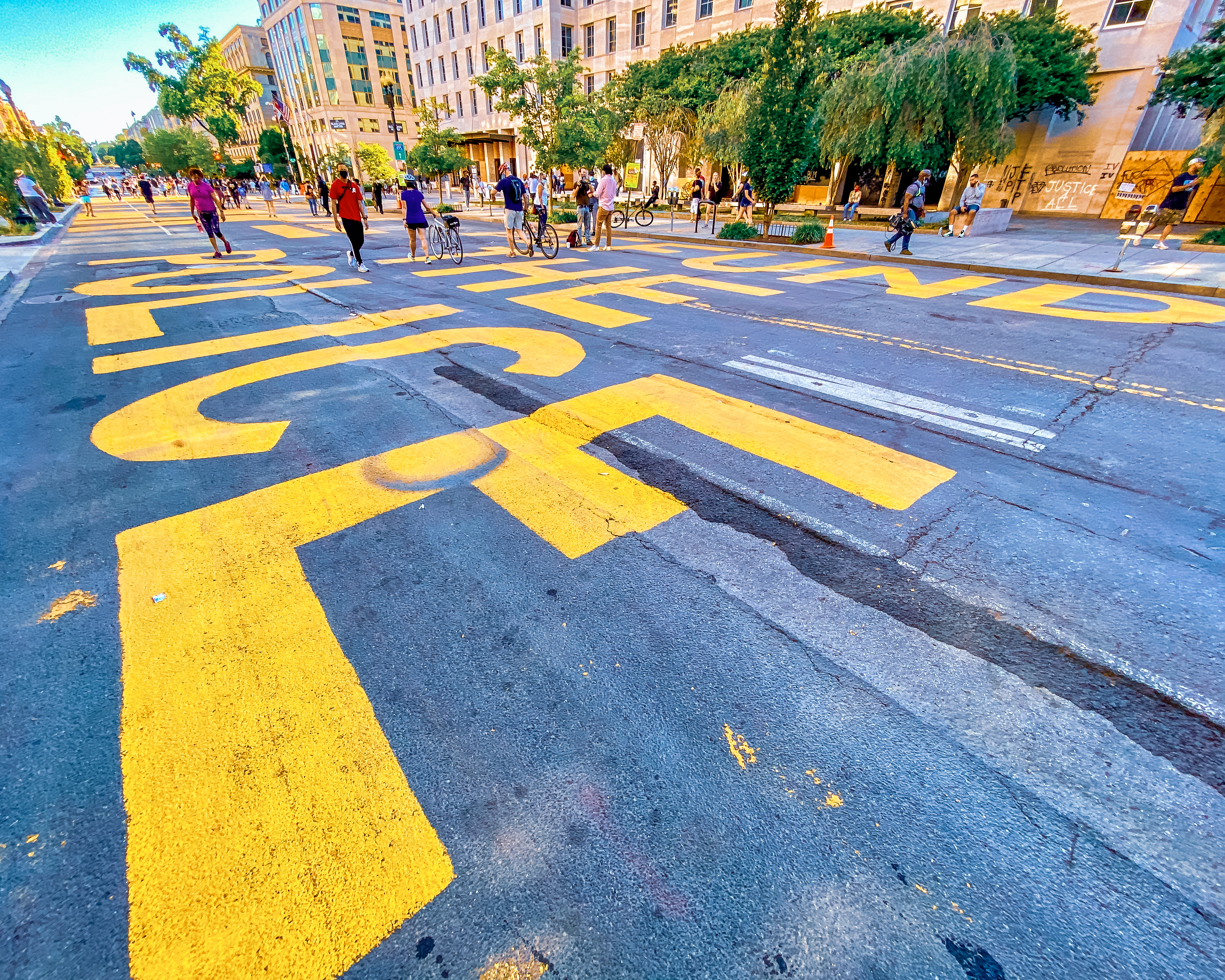
The Defund the police addition by activists to the mural

The group Black Lives Matter DC criticized the plaza's creation by calling the acts a "performative distraction from real policy changes." They demanded that Bowser move some funding from the D.C. police department to other community programs. On June 6, protesters painted "Defund the Police" in the same yellow block letters that the city had painted "Black Lives Matter." Protesters also painted black the 3 stars on top of the DC City Crest so that from the air the lettering on the street reads "BLACK LIVES MATTER = DEFUND THE POLICE." The stars on the DC crest were subsequently re-added.

Black Lives Matter Plaza became the site of a variety of future protests, on topics like racial justice, environmental justice, and international issues. Juneteenth celebrations were also held at the plaza.

Following the Mayor's announcement that the mural would be removed in 2025, Nee Nee Taylor, a founding member of Black Lives Matter DC reiterated the group's stance, stating "You never cared about Black Lives Mattering. You painting those words were performative."

=== Legal challenges ===
==== Religious groups ====
A group of religious organizations, including the Warriors for Christ and the Special Forces of Liberty, filed a federal lawsuit on June 12, 2020, against Bowser in the United States District Court for the District of Columbia over the renaming of the plaza. The suit contends that Black Lives Matter is a "cult for secular humanism" and a religious organization, and thus Bowser's action of renaming the plaza an endorsement of a religion violating the separation of church and state. The suit called for the mural to be removed and the plaza to be renamed to a more secular name, as well as the display of different banners giving equal time for other groups, which include All Lives Matter, Blue Lives Matter, and "Green Lives Matter" for National Guardsmen.

The lawsuit was dismissed by Judge Trevor N. McFadden on August 21, 2020, without prejudice. A refiled case was similarly dismissed on July 12, 2021, by Judge McFadden.

==== Judicial Watch group ====
The conservative activist group Judicial Watch also filed suit against Mayor Muriel Bowser and the District Department of Transportation in response to the installation of Black Lives Matter Plaza. Arguing that the painting of the Black Lives Matter message created a public forum for expression, Judicial Watch requested permission to paint its slogan "Because No One Is Above the Law!" in a similar size on a District street. After the District government did not respond to its inquiries, the group sued in the U.S. District Court for the District of Columbia, alleging a violation of its First Amendment rights. The case was dismissed on February 7, 2022, by Judge Tanya S. Chutkan.

== Removal ==
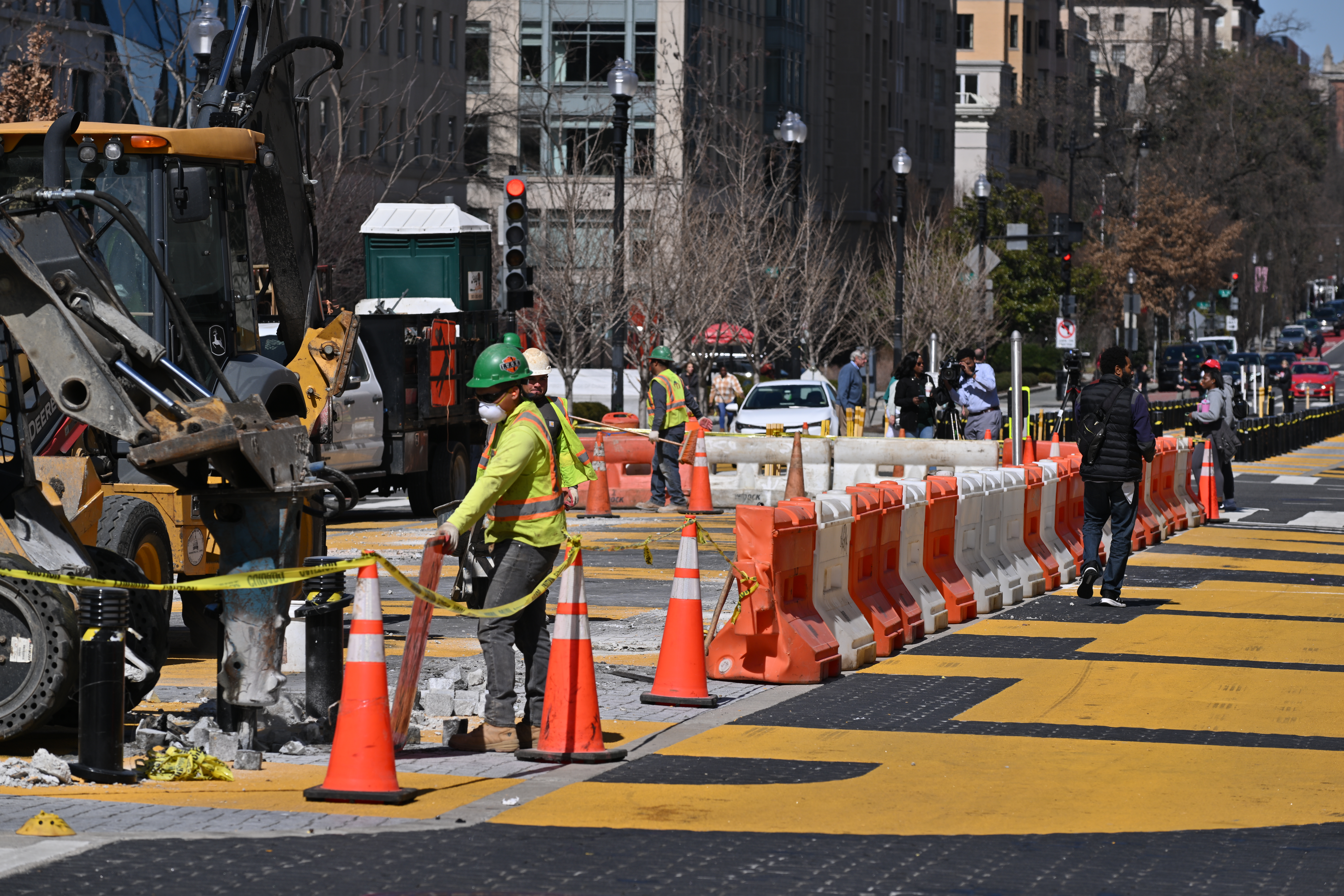
Crews beginning to remove the Black Lives Matter Plaza installation.

In March 2025, Andrew Clyde (R-GA) introduced a bill in the House of Representatives that would withhold certain federal funding from the city unless the plaza is renamed "Liberty Plaza", the mural is removed, and the city removes all references to "Black Lives Matter" from any official publications. On March 10, 2025, city crews began to remove the installation; Mayor Bowser stated that the removal was the result of threats of encroachment from both President Donald Trump and the Republican-controlled Congress. She stated that "the mural inspired millions of people and helped our city through a painful period, but now we can’t afford to be distracted by meaningless congressional interference. The devastating impacts of the federal job cuts must be our number one concern". It was stated that the plaza would receive new art by students and artists as part of DC's America 250 mural project.

The mural removal was expected to take six weeks of construction work. People gathered to witness the destruction of the mural and take pieces of the art.

Keyonna Jones, one of the mural's painters, said that the mural's destruction did not detract from its historical significance. She stated that she understood why Bowser removed the mural. Luckie Alexander, who designed an L.A. "All Black Lives Matter" mural, said that "seeing the BLM Plaza (in Washington) destroyed feels like we are going back in time, when Black folks and LGBTQ+ had to struggle just to exist". Megan Bailiff, CEO of Equus Striping, the company that had originally painted the mural, called the destruction "historically obscene".

== See also ==
- List of Black Lives Matter street murals
- Black Lives Matter Memorial Fence
