= Black Lives Matter Memorial Fence =

Art installation in Washington, D.C.

Coordinates: 38°54′0.5″N 77°2′11.5″W

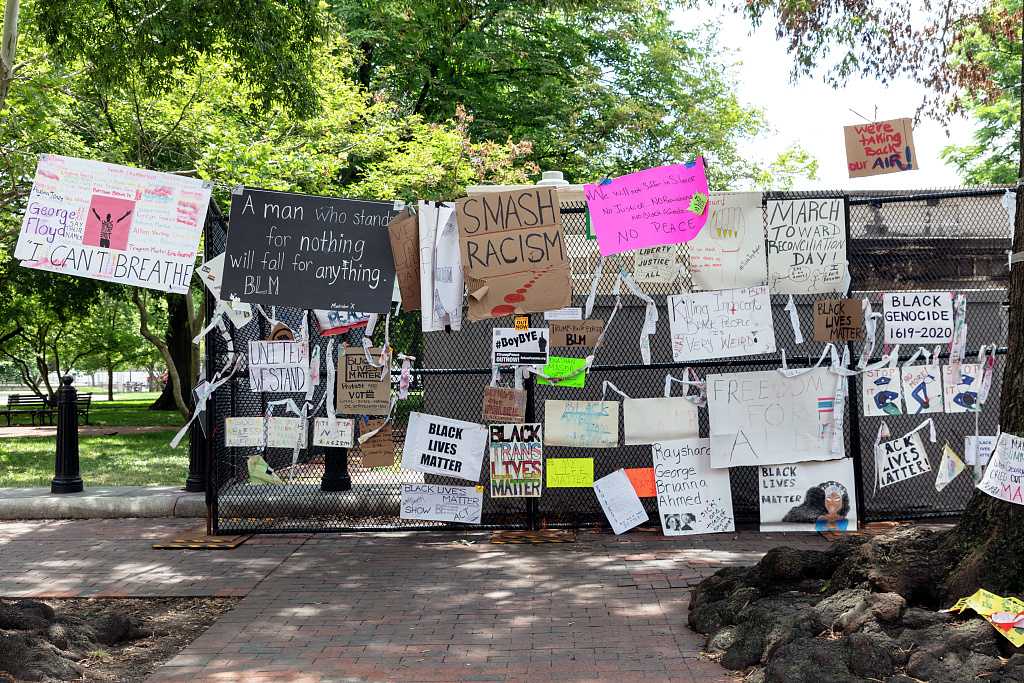
The fence on June 19, 2020

The Black Lives Matter Memorial Fence (BLM Memorial Fence) was a two-block eight-month long protest art installation of Black Lives Matter memorials attached by visitors and community activists to the chain link fence outside the White House on H Street, between Vermont Avenue and Connecticut Avenue NW in downtown Washington, D.C. in 2020 and 2021. The 1.7-mile (2.7 km) cordon of fencing around the White House was erected to move the growing crowds of protesters gathered at and around Lafayette Park after the murder of George Floyd on May 25, 2020. The Memorial Fence developed from June 2020 until it was dismantled and archived in January 2021. Members of the public worked together to maintain, protect, and then archive the thousands of signs and artworks that were offered by the public.

== Clearing and fencing of Lafayette Park ==
Lafayette Square on the north of the White House was cleared of protesters on June 1, 2020 to allow President Trump to walk from his White House residence to St. John's Episcopal Church to be photographed holding a Bible following a press conference about the protests at the White House. The use of a low-flying helicopter, chemical irritants, and military-style operations marked a new phase in the public protests.

The Square, an ongoing protest and vigil site for decades, was then surrounded by the expanding fence that included the White House. The fence facing north then became a gathering place and memorial that became known as the Black Lives Matter Memorial Fence.

== Development ==
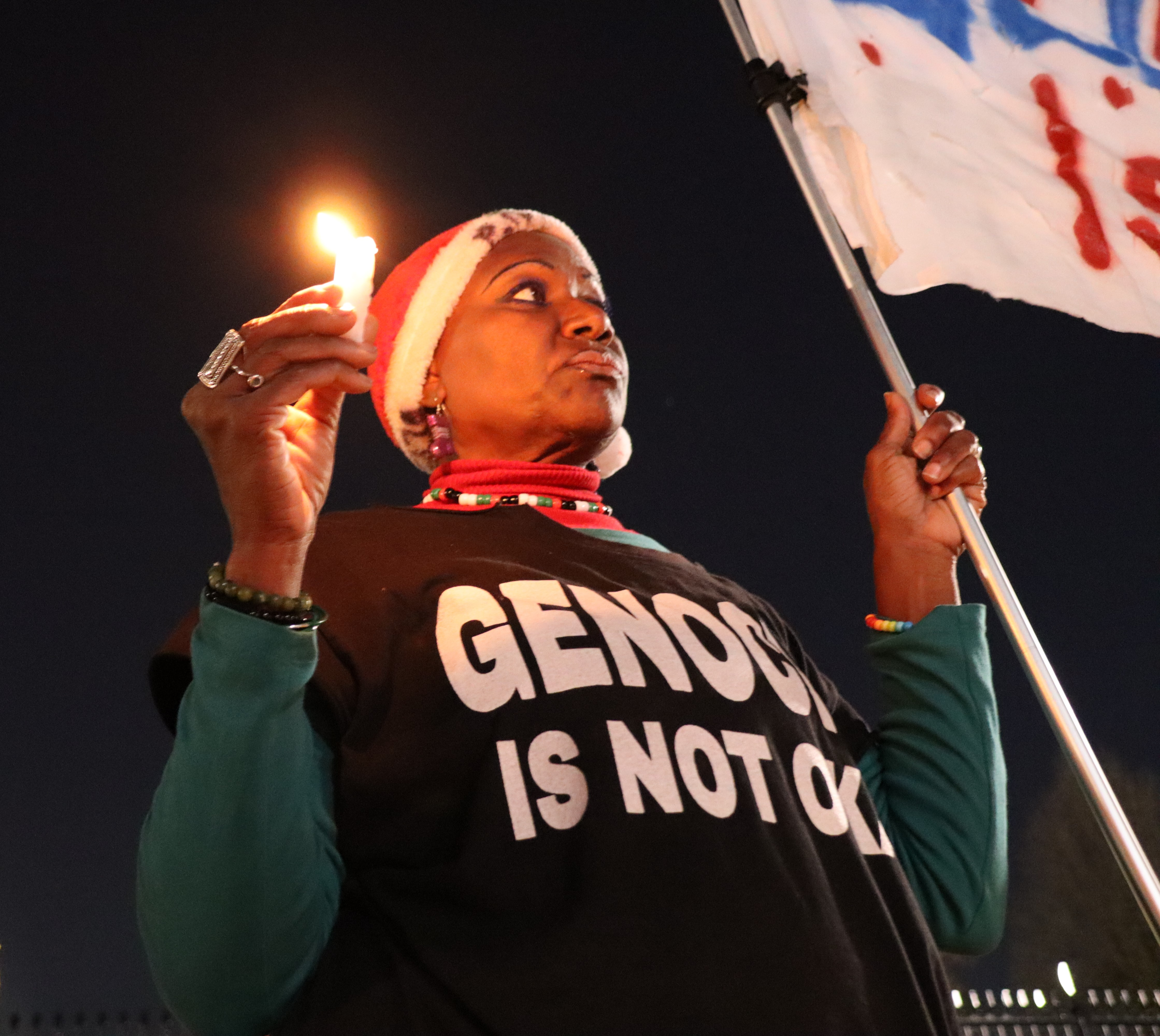
Nadine Seiler

Countless people from all over the world contributed to the Memorial Fence development, contents, and protection. The site became a place of pilgrimage, reverence, and celebration during a time of both pandemic and Black Lives Matter protest. A loosely organized group of activists, who came to call themselves the "Guardians of the Fence," kept an almost unbroken vigil from October 27, 2020, until January 30, 2021, at the fence to reduce harm from weather and vandalism. That group included Nadine Seiler, Karen Irwin, alongside the William Thomas Anti-Nuclear Peace Vigil. Through that autumn and the election, the Memorial Fence became a memorial space and the backdrop for election coverage seen around the world. Publicity about the fence drew both pro- and anti-BLM activists, memorials, and vandalism. At times, law enforcement closed off the area to prevent vandalism to the memorials and violence against the fence guardians. Supporters from around the world brought and sent art to go on or against the Fence, and donations to support the memorial.

== Timeline ==
=== 2020 ===
- May 25 - Public murder of George Floyd in Minneapolis.
- May 29 - Protests at White House grow as national and international protests increase. The White House was locked down and Donald Trump briefly moved to underground bunker.
- June 1 - President Trump staged a walk from his White House residence to St. John's Episcopal Church through empty streets cleared by military and law enforcement in riot gear.
- June 2 - The first fencing erected around the White House and Lafayette Park, removing public access to the area. Protesters responded to the fence's presence by lining up, rattling the fence, lobbing water bottles and other objects over it. After each day of protest, protest signs and other artifacts began to be left on the fence and sidewalk.
- June 5 - Mayor of the District of Columbia, Muriel Bowser, directed the DC Department of Public Works to paint the words "Black Lives Matter" in 35-foot yellow capital letters on 16th Street NW, on what is now officially named Black Lives Matter Plaza just north of Lafayette Park and the BLM Memorial.
- June 10 - Public access to Lafayette Park was reopened to the public at 11:58pm. Some of the original protest signs were hung on the fenced area by protesters. Protesters also hung signs and artifacts on the crowd control barriers and created a memorial space in front of the White House.
- June 22 - Black Lives Matter protesters attempted to topple the Andrew Jackson Statue located in the center of Lafayette Square. Police and secret service in riot gear again cleared the park and fencing was erected that included Lafayette Park.
- June 24 - Access to the area of the fence that would become the Black Lives Matter Memorial Fence was reopened to the public in the early morning of June 24. Within 24 hours the protest art covered the two-block length of fence and the site became a focus for memorialization, solidarity, and a meeting place for BLM activists.
- October 26 - The first major act of vandalism of the BLM Memorial Fence followed the Supreme Court confirmation of Amy Coney Barrett when a small group of anti-BLM activists systematically tore down and tried to destroy all the memorial materials. An informal group of community members formed an alliance to protect the Memorial Fence from future desecration by gathering the damaged memorial art and removing it.
- October 27 - Activists at the Fence worked with Nadine Seiler, the unofficial curator of the installation, alongside the They/Them Collective and other BLM activists, returned the torn and damaged signs to the fence, repaired them with tape, and re-hung them on the fence. More signs and art were created and added to replace the destroyed pieces.
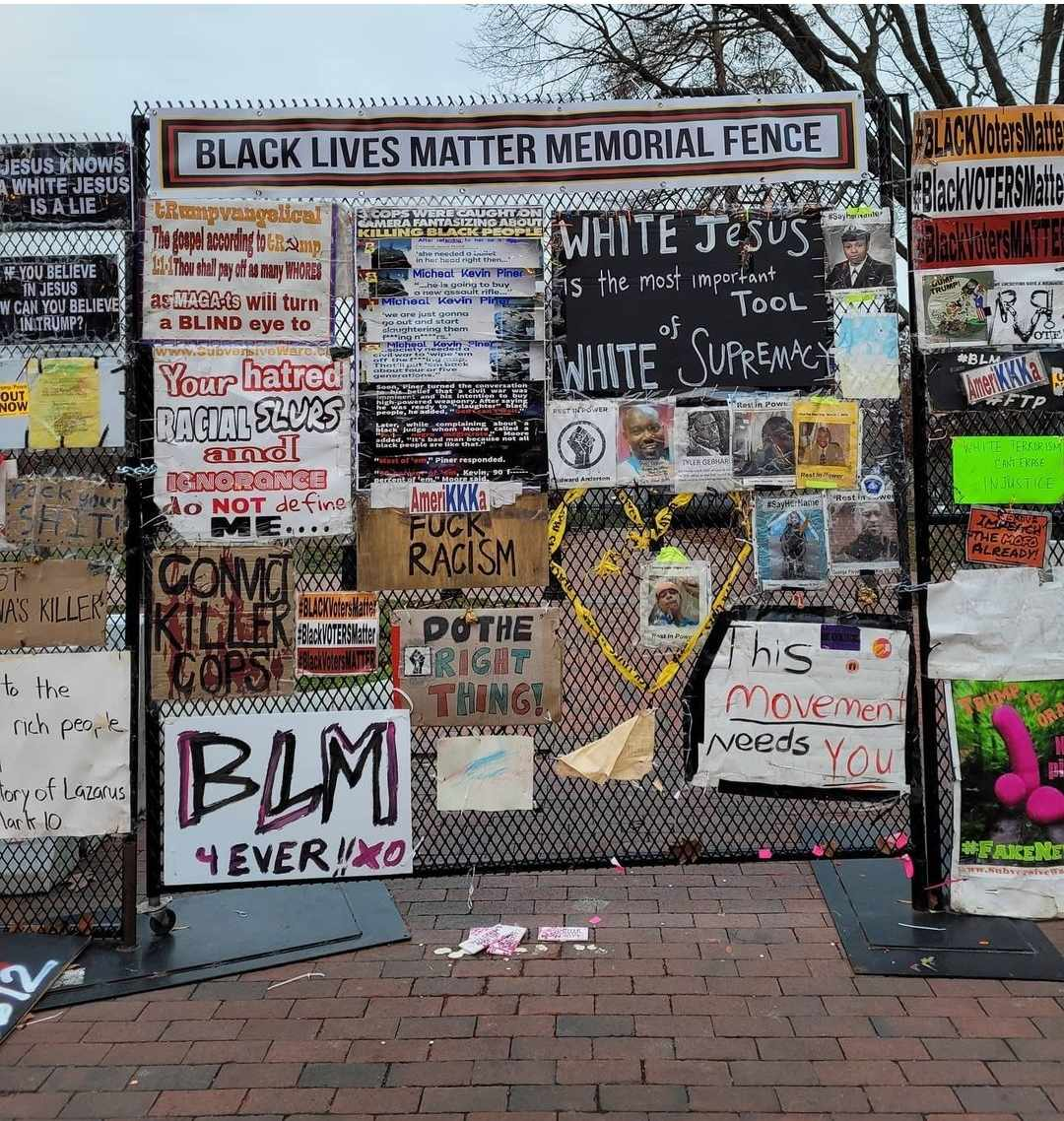
- November 13–15 - Organized attacks on the BLM Memorial Fence culminated in action by the MPD which closed down the two-block area of the Fence to the public on the morning of November 15 while the William Thomas Anti-Nuclear Peace Vigil and some BLM Fence archivists and other allies remained on site.
- December 11–16 (and January 4 thru January 22nd, 2021) - Closures of the street forced the "guardians of the fence" to hold the space as close to the fence as possible on BLM Plaza. BLM protesters and allies organized to bring bicycles and lined them up along the length of the fence to protect the fence. DC residents and supporters from around the country donated money, art supplies, food, first aid, clothing, flags, and encouragement to the guardians of the fence.
- December 17, 2020 - Community activists led by BLM DC, ShutDownDC, Good Trouble Co-op, and the Palm Collective rehung the salvaged protest art and memorials.
- Christmas Day 2020 - A banner with the words Black Lives Matter Memorial Fence was hung: unofficially dedicating the fence a memorial space with that title.

On January 30, 2021, all fallen signs and artifacts were re-hung, fence panels numbered, and photographed, then the collection was put into storage administrated by Seiler as the Black Lives Matter Memorial Fence Collection.
