= Black Lives Matter street mural (Salt Lake City) =

Mural in Salt Lake City, Utah, U.S.

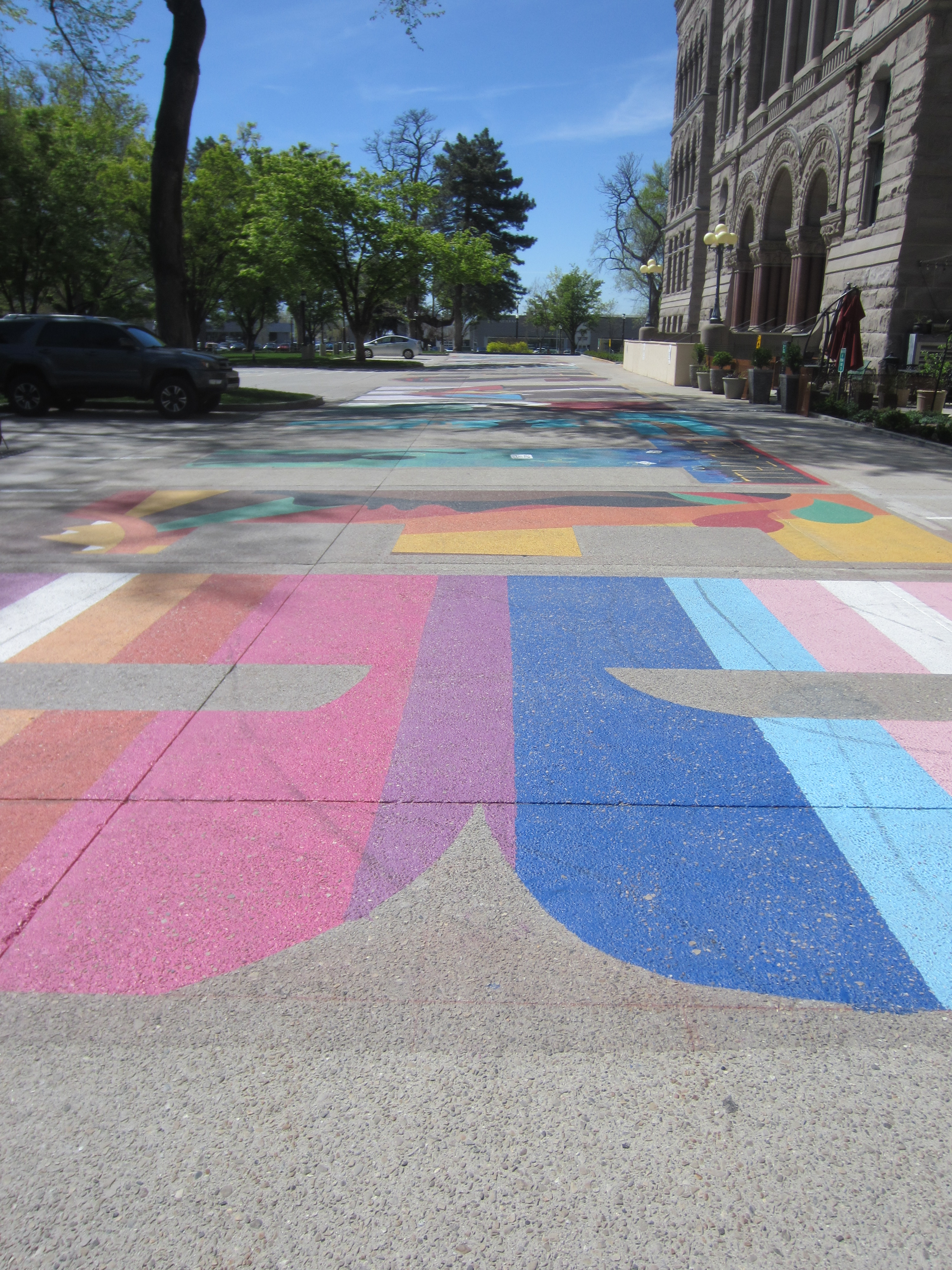
- Part of the mural in April 2021
- Artist: Pablo Abarca; Donovan Guerrero; Emma Lamae; Liz Lambson; Chris Ownes; Abigail Rodriguez; Chloe and Gretel Tam; Veronica Zak
- Completion date: August 4, 2020
- Location: Salt Lake City, Utah, United States; 40.7596°N 111.8872°W

In August 2020, eight artists painted a Black Lives Matter street mural in Salt Lake City's Washington Square Park, outside the Salt Lake City and County Building, in the U.S. state of Utah. The city had commissioned the painting with a contest "to support and memorialize the national movement to eliminate systemic racism".

== Description and history ==
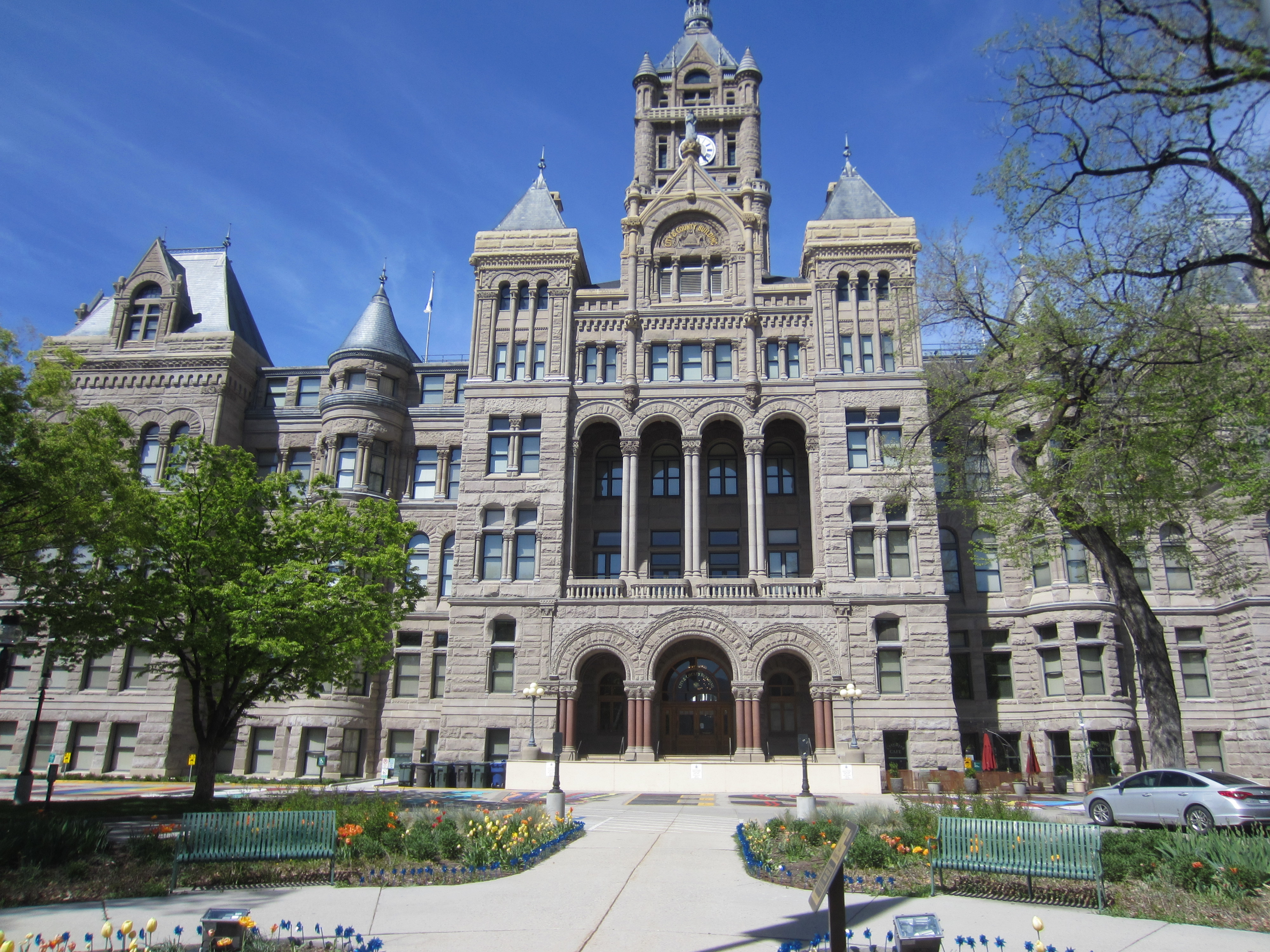
The mural was painted outside the Salt Lake City and County Building (pictured in April 2021).

In July 2020, the city announced a contest for local artists to participate. Mayor Erin Mendenhall said:

We want to make it clear that Salt Lake City believes Black Lives Matter and is committed to real change in our community. We're taking this symbolic step as a city to boldly acknowledge this movement and commit to our role in it. An important part of this for us is creating a space where artists and community members are able to come together to express their feelings on this movement.

Design submissions were accepted during July 8–15. On July 16, a committee selected and announced artists to fill in the outlined 16-letter phrase. Panelists included Mendenhall, Black Lives Matter Utah founder Lex Scott, council member Ana Valdemoros, and creative director Chris Owens. The city intended the mural to be temporary but digitally preserved.

The mural was painted by eight artists, sometimes credited as the Black Artists Collective or Utah Black Artists Collective, on August 4. Each artist painted two letters of "Black Lives Matter" and received a $300 stipend for supplies. According to KSTU's Elle Thomas, "each letter is unique. Some feature historical moments, others displaying current events and some promoting all-inclusivity amid diversity." Owens painted Breonna Taylor within the "B". Veronica Zak painted a "T". Pablo Abarca, Donovan Guerrero, Emma Lamae, Liz Lambson, Abigail Rodriguez, and Chloe and Gretel Tam were also selected.

== Reception ==
Scott said, "This mural is a symbol of how this country is changing, and coming to understand the movement. We have been in these streets working towards justice and equality for 6 years. Now we get a visual representation of our work and goals to truly achieve justice in this country."

In September 2020, a resident prepared to file a lawsuit against Mendenhall and the city for "not allowing other groups to have the same right to express opposing political points".

== See also ==
- 2020 in art
