= ShutDownDC =

Washington, D.C.–based activist organization, founded in 2019

- Abbreviation: SDDC
- Formation: 2019; 7 years ago
- Headquarters: Washington, D.C., U.S.
- Origins: Climate movement
- Website: https://www.shutdowndc.org/

ShutDownDC is an activist organization in the Washington, D.C. metropolitan area. It was formed in 2019 as a coalition of activists concerned with the climate crisis; the group has since staged actions to create traffic congestion in Washington as a means of demanding the Green New Deal and other climate-related issues.

Since its founding, ShutDownDC has additionally expanded its scope to include advocacy via non-violent direct action on issues such as abortion rights, the International Monetary Fund and the World Bank's treatment of the Global South, the Build Back Better Plan, and the abolition of the filibuster in the United States Senate, among other concerns.

== History and activities ==
ShutDownDC has been supported by groups such as Code Pink, Black Lives Matter Global Network, and the Sunrise Movement. Other supporters include the D.C. chapter of the Democratic Socialists of America, Rising Tide North America, the D.C. chapter of Extinction Rebellion, the Chesapeake Climate Action Network, Beyond Extreme Energy, WERK for Peace, the D.C. chapter of 350.org, the Backbone Campaign, the Friends Meeting in Washington Social Concerns Committee, and the Labor Network for Sustainability, among others.

=== 2019 ===
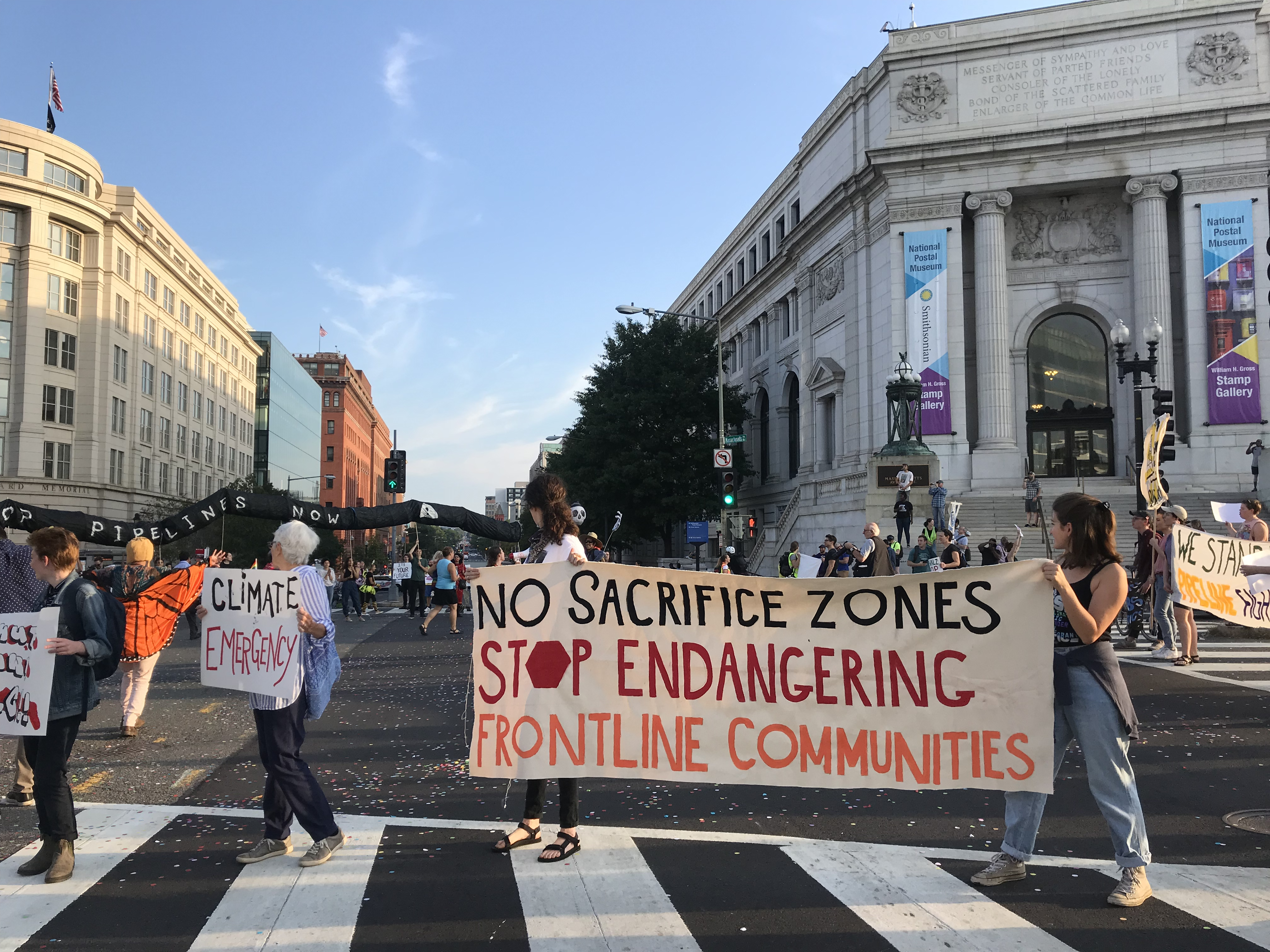
Protestors and props during ShutDownDC's first blockade on Capitol Hill in September 2019

On September 23, 2019, the coalition set up blockades at 22 intersections in Washington, D.C., slowing traffic across the city. During the demonstration, 32 participants were arrested.

Despite its formation as a temporary organizing structure, ShutDownDC continued to participate in climate protests as an affinity group thereafter, eventually growing into a full-fledged organization.

=== 2020 ===
During the COVID-19 pandemic, ShutDownDC broadened its focus and engaged in a week of action around International Workers' Day 2020, aiming to highlight how the pandemic had exacerbated inequality. Actions taken by the group included a bike protest in support of essential workers, the painting of a large street mural in support of Amazon employees outside of Jeff Bezos' D.C. house, and a protest in solidarity with labor strikes.

ShutDownDC additionally played a role in the George Floyd protests in Washington, D.C. by organizing protests at Lafayette Square; at the Alexandria, Virginia home of then-acting United States Department of Homeland Security Secretary Chad Wolf; and at President Donald Trump's speech to the 2020 Republican National Convention.

Later, during the 2020 United States presidential election, ShutDownDC organized a protest outside the home of US Postmaster General Louis DeJoy who had been facing allegations of slowing the postal service to suppress voters. ShutDownDC also planned a week of action to "defend democracy" in the event that President Donald Trump lost the election to Joe Biden but refused to transfer power, asserting that "Trump will not leave office without mass mobilization and direct action." Such hypothetical plans included a large event with live performers on election night at the Black Lives Matter Plaza.

After the 2020 general election, ShutDownDC led efforts to pressure hotels to enforce COVID-19 restrictions on those coming to the city for protests against Biden's victory. The group also advocated for the city to revoke Harry's Bar's liquor license; the bar had been fined for violating COVID-19 restrictions by allowing crowds of people, mostly maskless Trump supporters, after election-related protests.

As efforts to overturn the 2020 United States presidential election intensified, ShutDownDC hosted a vigil outside of the Vienna, Virginia house of Missouri Senator Josh Hawley where protestors sang songs and delivered a copy of the Constitution to his doorstep. Hawley claimed that the protests were violent despite local police describing the protests as peaceful. ShutDownDC also dropped body bags in front of the homes of other Republican senators to demand COVID-19 relief legislation.

=== 2021 ===
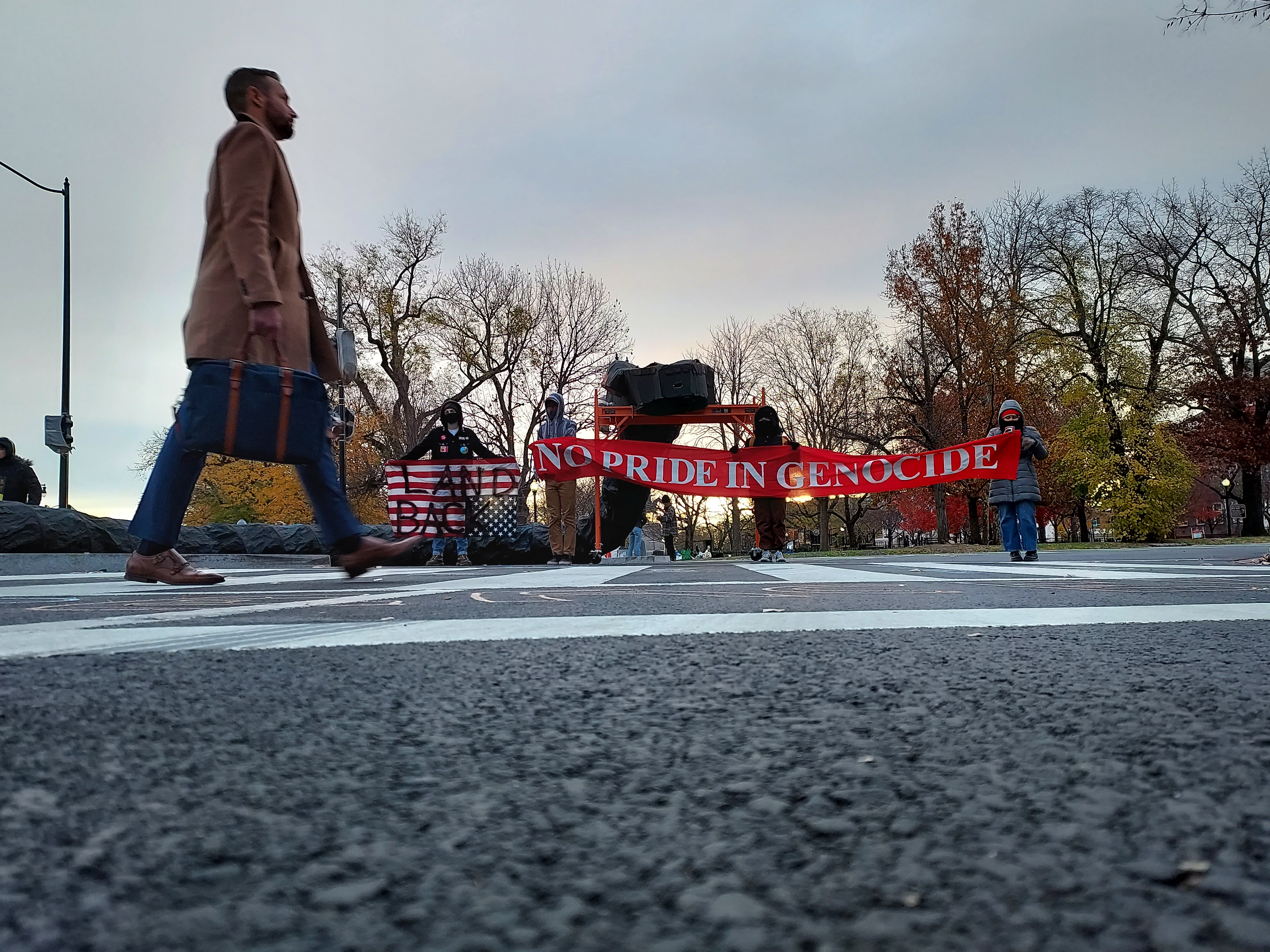
Protestors with ShutDownDC blockade an intersection near the United States Capitol in December 2021

In January 2021, ShutDownDC ran a successful pressure campaign to cancel all Airbnb bookings in Washington, D.C., alleging an uptick of right-wing violence after the January 6 United States Capitol attack. In August 2021, ShutDownDC led a protest opposing the Line 3 pipeline at the home of White House Chief of Staff Ron Klain. There, 23 people were arrested by the Montgomery County Police Department.

In September 2021, when the Supreme Court declined to block a law restricting abortion in Texas, ShutDownDC led a protest for reproductive rights in front of the Chevy Chase, Maryland home of Supreme Court Justice Brett Kavanaugh. One month later, in October, ShutDownDC led a 25-hour-long protest outside Kentucky Senator Mitch McConnell's house to demand that the Senate filibuster be abolished.

In December 2021, ShutDownDC helped organize a coalition of organizations to engage in a large blockade of traffic in Washington, D.C. in support of the Build Back Better Act which included climate-related measures and other policies in line with ShutDownDC's priorities. Approximately 150 people participated to cause traffic delays around the United States Capitol; the United States Capitol Police subsequently arrested 38 people.

=== 2022 ===
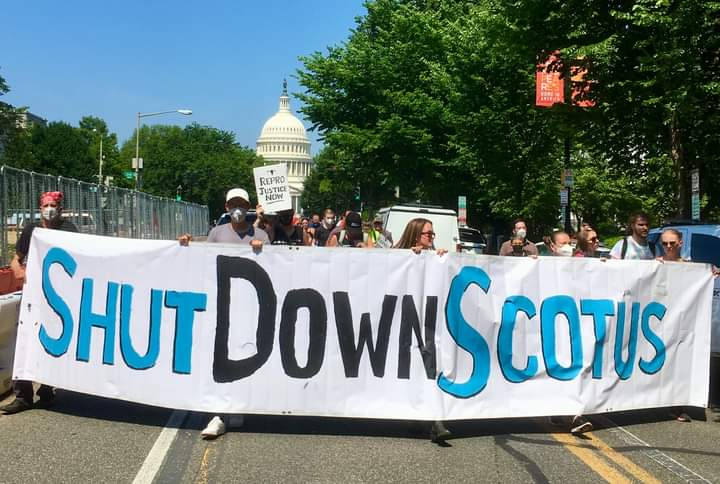
Protestors with ShutDownDC blockade a street behind the Supreme Court of the United States in June 2022

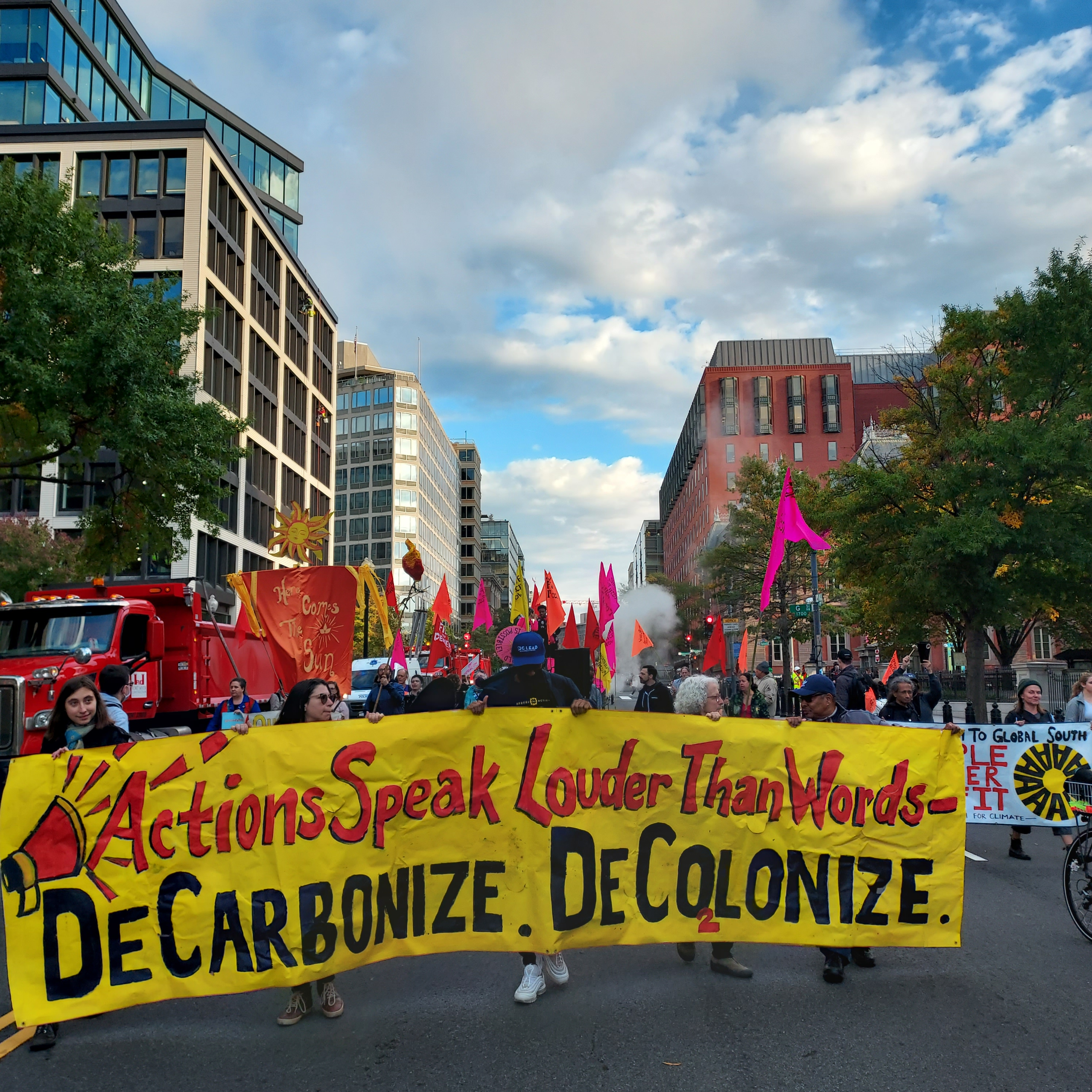
Protestors with ShutDownDC's #ForPeopleForPlanet protest the IMF and World Bank's role in the climate crisis and other concerns, in October 2022

In January 2022, ShutDownDC organized a small-scale blockade around the White House, again in support of the Build Back Better Act among other demands for the Biden administration.

In June 2022, in the wake of the leaked draft Supreme Court decision in Dobbs v. Jackson Women's Health Organization, ShutDownDC organized large-scale street blockades in the areas around the Supreme Court. One month later, protesters attempted to confront Kavanaugh at a Washington, D.C. location of Morton's The Steakhouse for his role in Dobbs v. Jackson Women's Health Organization, forcing Kavanaugh to leave the restaurant through a back door.

The July protest of Kavanaugh was defended by political figures such as Secretary of Transportation Pete Buttigieg who called it an exercise in "free speech"; U.S. Representative Alexandria Ocasio-Cortez tweeted, "Poor guy. He left before his soufflé because he decided half the country should risk death if they have an ectopic pregnancy within the wrong state lines. It’s all very unfair to him." Later, in a viral tweet, ShutDownDC offered service workers in the D.C. area up to $250 for sightings of Supreme Court justices Brett Kavanaugh, Samuel Alito, Clarence Thomas, Neil Gorsuch, Amy Coney Barrett, and John Roberts.

In October 2022, ShutDownDC organized a coalition of organizations for a week of actions surrounding the annual meetings of the IMF and World Bank. The coalition used the slogan "For People, For Planet: Decarbonize & Decolonize." Demands included an end to fossil fuel investment by the institutions, as well as the canceling of debts held by countries in the Global South.

In December 2022, ShutDownDC activists disrupted a banquet held to benefit the Capitol Hill Pregnancy Center, a crisis pregnancy center, at a Marriott in Crystal City, Virginia. ShutDownDC claimed that the clinic "lies to patients, endangers pregnant people, and is part of a national anti-abortion network."

=== 2023 ===
In April 2023, ShutDownDC held a bike protest to block traffic near the World Bank headquarters, calling for the bank's incoming president Ajay Banga to stop funding fossil fuels and accelerate clean energy instead.

== Criticism ==
ShutdownDC has been criticized by many members of the Republican Party, as well as by venues where ShutDownDC protests have taken place. Criticism of the organization has focused on ideological disagreements and on the tactics used by ShutDownDC.

In the run-up to ShutDownDC's street blockades in protest of the Supreme Court, Florida governor Ron DeSantis accused ShutDownDC of plotting an insurrection. After their disruption of Kavanaugh's dinner at Morton's The Steakhouse, the restaurant released a statement criticizing the group, stating, "Politics, regardless of your side or views, should not trample the freedom at play of the right to congregate and eat dinner," and that "Disturbing the dinner of all of our customers was an act of selfishness." An editorial writer for Deseret News, the mouthpiece of The Church of Jesus Christ of Latter-day Saints, criticized the group for promoting "mob rule" with its protests of Supreme Court justices.

During ShutDownDC's protest outside of his house in 2020, Hawley referred to the group as "antifa scumbags." Later, following the group's disruptions of an annual banquet for the Capitol Hill Pregnancy Center in 2022, Hawley remarked, "These people are such losers." The Heritage Foundation, a prominent conservative think tank, called the same protest "gross" on Twitter.
