= District of Columbia Department of Public Works =

United States agency

Coordinates: 38°55′3.234″N 77°1′57.2442″W

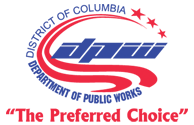
- Logo

Agency overview
- Formed: 1985; 41 years ago
- Preceding agencies: District of Columbia Department of Environmental Services; District of Columbia Department of Transportation
- Jurisdiction: District of Columbia
- Headquarters: Washington, D.C.
- Employees: 1,479 (fiscal 2020)
- Annual budget: $187,423,616 (fiscal 2020)
- Agency executive: Timothy Spriggs, Director
- Website: dpw.dc.gov

The District of Columbia Department of Public Works (DPW) is an agency of the government of the District of Columbia, in the United States. The department oversees solid waste (e.g., garbage) and recyclables collection, street cleaning, parking enforcement, and governmental vehicle procurement, maintenance and fueling.

== Public works in the 19th century ==
On July 9, 1790, Congress passed the Residence Act, which approved the creation of a national capital for the United States on the Potomac River. The exact location was to be selected by President George Washington, who signed the bill into law on July 16. Congress subsequently passed the Organic Act of 1801, which officially organized the District of Columbia and placed the entire territory under the exclusive control of the federal government. The city's incorporation allowed for a local municipal government consisting of a mayor appointed by the President and an elected six-member council. In 1820, the Congress granted the City of Washington a new charter, which allowed for a mayor elected by voters. Public works during this period largely consisted of creating, grading, and paving roads and sidewalks, creating a stormwater drainage system, and street lighting. But the District had little taxable property with which to generate revenues, and Congress spent little money on infrastructure improvements in the District of Columbia unless they were directly related to federal buildings and property, or to Pennsylvania Avenue.

In 1871, Congress passed the District of Columbia Organic Act, which merged the various town, city, and county governments that controlled the District of Columbia into a single 11-member legislature led by a territorial governor. This legislation also authorized a Board of Public Works, whose duties were to identify critical needs regarding streets, alleys, sewers, roads, and bridges; let contracts; and oversee work. It work was funded by assessments on properties adjacent these improvements, which were approved by the city legislature. The legislature also had sole authority to allow the Board of Public Works to seek loans to begin its various projects.

When expenditures on city infrastructure by the Board of Public Works came close to bankrupting the city in 1874, an outraged Congress passed legislation on June 30, 1874, abolishing the territorial government and replacing it with a "temporary" three-member commission. Two of the commissioners were appointed by the President of the United States with the approval of the Senate, while a third member was selected by the United States Army Corps of Engineers. The "Corps Commissioner" had oversight over the city's public works.

== Public works under home rule ==
=== Home Rule Act ===
In 1967, President Lyndon Johnson reorganized the District government. The three-commissioner system was replaced by a government headed by a nine-member city council, a single mayor-commissioner, and an assistant to the mayor-commissioner, all appointed by the president. In March 1971, President Richard Nixon supported legislation formally implementing home rule in the District of Columbia. On December 24, 1973, Congress enacted the District of Columbia Home Rule Act, providing for an elected mayor and the 13-member Council of the District of Columbia.

=== Department of Public Works ===
Initially, public works under home rule were provided by four city agencies: The Department of Environment, the Department of General Services, the Department of Transportation, and the Office of Surveys. In April 1980, Mayor Marion Barry proposed merging these four agencies into a single Department of Public Works. But Barry's plan was not acted on.

Barry scaled back his plan, and in December 1983 he issued Reorganization Plan No. 4. This plan merged the Department of Environmental Services and the Department of Transportation into a new Department of Public Works. The new agency had six divisions: public spaces maintenance; fleet maintenance; design and engineering and construction management of public buildings, streets, and other projects; transportation projects and systems; and construction and maintenance of sewer and water systems. The plan was effective March 1, 1984.

The Department of Public Works has had its authority expanded twice. In 1987, Mayor Barry granted the agency the authority "to issue grants for research related to the construction and monitoring of public facilities designed to improve water quality." Barry's successor, Mayor Sharon Pratt Kelly transferred the city's weatherization assistance program from the Department of Housing and Community Development to the Department of Public Works.

The department has also had its authority contract twice. The first time occurred in 1988, when the Council of the District of Columbia passed the "Division of Park Services Act of 1988". This act transferred the city-run parks from the Department of Public Works to the Department of Recreation, and renamed that agency the Department of Recreation and Parks.

The second contraction came in 2002, when oversight of transportation projects was removed from the Department of Public Works. The Division of Transportation was a subunit of the Department of Public Works since its creation in 1984. The division began suffering from significant deficiencies in the 1990s, including an over-reliance on outside contractors, a lack of expertise with which to oversee contractors and ensure performance and quality work, severe understaffing, and excessive lead times for the letting and implementing of design and construction contracts. These issues led to significant backlogs in maintenance and construction, and hundreds of millions of dollars in federal funds were unexpended. In response to the impending management crisis in the transportation division, in May 2002 the Council of the District of Columbia passed the District Department of Transportation Establishment Act of 2002 (D.C. Law 14-137), which separated the Division of Transportation from the Department of Public Works and created a standalone District of Columbia Department of Transportation. A 2004 assessment indicated that the reorganization led to significant improvements in the District of Columbia's oversight of its transportation infrastructure.

== Bibliography ==
- Crew, Harvey W.; Webb, William Bensing; Wooldridge, John (1892). Centennial History of the City of Washington, D.C., With Full Outline of the Natural Advantages, Accounts of the Indian Tribes, Selection of the Site, Founding of the City ... to the Present Time. Dayton, Ohio: United Brethren Pub. House.
