= 2020 in art =

The year 2020 in art involved various significant events.

== Events ==
- January 20 - Vincent van Gogh's Self-Portrait as a Sick Person (August 1889) from the collection of the National Museum of Art, Architecture and Design in Oslo is verified by experts at the Van Gogh Museum in Amsterdam as authentic.
- February - A painting of a Head of an Old Man, previously rejected as an authentic Rembrandt, from the reserve collection of the Ashmolean Museum in Oxford, England, is confirmed through dendrochronology as painted on a board which had been in Rembrandt's studio.
- February 10 - Rembrandt's Portrait of a Young Lady (1632) from the collection of the Allentown Art Museum in Allentown, Pennsylvania is announced as authentic having been reassessed after conservation.
- February 11 - David Hockney's 1966 painting The Splash sells for £23.1m at auction at Sotheby's in London.
- February 13 - A Banksy artwork for Valentine's Day appears on the side wall of a house in Barton Hill, Bristol, England.
- March - COVID-19 pandemic in Scotland: The Rebel Bear and others paint street art in Glasgow.
- March 10 - The discovery of Salvador Dalí's painting Purgatory Canto 32 in a Kitty Hawk, North Carolina thrift store is reported.
- March 14 - Paintings by Van Dyck, Annibale Carracci, and Salvator Rosa are stolen from Christ Church Picture Gallery in Oxford, England.
- March 30 - Vincent van Gogh's 1886 painting The Parsonage Garden at Nuenen (on loan from the Groninger Museum) is stolen from the Singer Laren museum in Laren, Netherlands while it is closed because of the COVID-19 pandemic in the Netherlands.
- April - The Hula Hoop Tree in Amber, Iowa is felled.
- April 3 - A 1980 statue of Ivan Konev, a Marshal of the Soviet Union, in Prague is removed.
- April 15 - Banksy posts on his Instagram account a series of pictures showing stencilled rats causing mayhem in a private bathroom during the coronavirus lockdown.
- May - The San Francisco Art Institute (SFAI) in San Francisco, California in the United States announces that it will not be accepting new students for the fall 2020 semester ostensibly entailing its closure after 150 years, including having survived the 1906 San Francisco Earthquake.
- May 6 - A new Banksy framed artwork, Game Changer, in appreciation of nursing staff is hung in Southampton General Hospital during the COVID-19 pandemic in the United Kingdom, later to be auctioned in aid of the health service.
- May 7 - Quentin Blake's large artwork The Taxi Driver is the centrepiece of a one-man exhibition at Hastings Contemporary in England which opens on this day to be viewed only remotely due to the coronavirus lockdown.
- May 26 - It is announced that this year's Turner Prize award in the United Kingdom is to be replaced by a bursary for 10 artists which will be announced in July due to the COVID-19 pandemic.
- June 7 - An 1895 statue of Edward Colston, a 17th-century merchant, slave trader, MP and philanthropist (by John Cassidy), is pulled down by British Black Lives Matter protesters in Bristol, England.
- June 11 - Fugitive art dealer Inigo Philbrick, accused of swindling artworks valued in excess of $20 million US is apprehended and arrested by U.S. government agents on the South Pacific Island nation of Vanuatu and then transported to the U.S. territory of Guam to face federal charges.
- June and July - In Richmond, Virginia, in the United States, following a series of actions taken against monuments to both the leaders of the vanquished Military forces of the Confederate States and one to Richmond African American native son and tennis legend Arthur Ashe, including the emblazoning of the Ashe memorial with the graffiti tags "White Lives Matter" and then "Black Lives Matter" and attempts by crowds to pull down the effigies of the defeated nation's armed forces' field commanders; all of the statues of the military leaders of the Confederacy are removed by the City of Richmond from Monument Avenue where they had been since the first decade of the 20th century, with the exception of the semblance of Robert E. Lee which is on State of Virginia owned land. The Governor of Virginia, Ralph Northam, moves to remove the statue of Lee but is blocked by a court injunction issued after the filing of a lawsuit.
- July - It is announced that the history of Salvator Mundi (c.1500) by Leonardo da Vinci, the most expensive artwork on record ever sold will be the subject of a forthcoming Broadway musical set to take the stage in 2021.
- July 14 - Banksy reveals in a video that he had decorated the interior of a car of London Underground rolling stock with graphics, If You Don't Mask, You Don't Get, relating to the COVID-19 pandemic in the United Kingdom, subsequently removed by Transport for London.
- July 15 - A statue rendered in black resin by Marc Quinn of a British Black Lives Matter protestor, A Surge of Power (Jen Reid) 2020, is installed clandestinely by the artist on the plinth vacated by overthrow of the Statue of Edward Colston in Bristol without official permission; it is removed from this location 24 hours later by Bristol City Council which tweets "This morning we removed the sculpture. It will be held at our museum for the artist to collect or donate to our collection".
- July 22 - Berlin-based American-born German curator Rebeccah Blum is murdered and the suspect in the case, her former partner, the English Berlin-based photographer, Saul Fletcher, commits suicide.
- July 28 - Sotheby's London stages an auction sale, 'Rembrandt to Richter', which includes Paolo Uccello's Battle on the Banks of a River ("probably the Battle of the Metaurus - 207 BCE") in part settlement with the Gutmann family for the work's forced sale by the Nazi Reich in 1942.
- July 30 - Heather Phillipson's sculpture The End on the Fourth plinth, Trafalgar Square, London, is inaugurated.
- October - Four museums; the National Gallery of Art in Washington D.C., the Museum of Fine Arts Houston, the Tate Modern in London, and the Boston Museum of Fine Arts in canceling an upcoming Philip Guston exhibition, "Philip Guston Now" cite the works by the artist which employ depictions of hooded figures representing members of the American racist organization the Ku Klux Klan. After an enormous uproar the traveling exhibition is subsequeqntly rescheduled for dates beginning in 2022 in an amended form to include the contribution of contemporary artists and historians.
- November 16 - Work to dismantle the flanking walls of a pavilion erected by Tadao Ando at Piccadilly Gardens in Manchester city centre in England (2002) begins.

== Exhibitions ==
- Scheduled exhibition dates may have been affected by the COVID-19 pandemic.
- January 1 until December 31 - "Gifts in Celebration of the Museum's Anniversary" at the Metropolitan Museum of Art in New York City (on the Occasion of the museum's 150th year).
- February 12 until May 31 - "Pier Paolo Pasolini: Subversive Prophet" at the Neuberger Museum of Art in Purchase, New York.
- February 13 untîl August 16 - Norman Bluhm: Metamorphoses at the Newark Museum in Newark, New Jersey.
- February 27 until March 17 - "David Hockney: Drawing from Life" at the National Portrait Gallery, London (closed early due to the COVID-19 pandemic) then traveled to the Morgan Library & Museum in New York City from October 2 until May 30, 2021.
- March 4 until July 5 - "Gerhard Richter: Painting After All" at the Met Breuer in New York City.
- March 5 until April 4 - "Kara Walker: Drawings" at Sikekema Jenkins & Co. in New York City.
- March 7 until June 1 - "Enchanted Worlds: Hokusai, Hiroshige and the Art of Edo Japan" at the Auckland Art Gallery in Auckland, New Zealand.
- September 3 until October 8 - "Louise Nevelson + James Little" at Rosenbaum Contemporary in Boca Raton, Florida.
- September 8 until October 17 - "Kim Dingle: Restaurant Mandalas" at the Andrew Kreps gallery in New York City.
- September 12 until January 21, 2021 - "Betye Saar: Call and Response" at the Morgan Library and Museum in New York City.
- September 17 until February 7, 2021 - Cecily Brown at Blenheim Palace at Blenheim Palace in Woodstock, Oxfordshire, England.
- September 20 until January 6, 2021 - Frienfs and Friends of Friends at the Schlossmuseum in Linz, Austria.
- September 21 until May 9, 2021 - "Frank Stella's Stars", a Survey" at the Aldrich Museum of Contemporary Art in Ridgefield, Connecticut.
- September 28 until October 12. 2021 - Turner's Modern World at the Tate Britain in London.
- September 30 until March 13. 2021 - "Church & Rothko: Sublime" at the Mnuchin gallery in New York City.
- October 18 until July 25, 2021 - "Writing the Future: Basquiat and the Hip-Hop Generation" at the Museum of Fine Arts, Boston in Boston, Massachusetts.
- October 19 until May 9, 2021 - "Pictures Revisited" at the Metropolitan Museum of Art in New York City.
- October 23 until March 14, 2021 - "Andres Serrano: Infamous" at Fotografiska in New York City.
- October 29 until December 19 - "Julio Le Parc: Color and Colors" at Perrotin Gallery in New York City.
- November 6 until December 19 - Sam Gilliam: Existed Existing at Pace Gallery in New York City.
- November 13 until April 4, 2021 - Salman Toor: How Will I Know at the Whitney Museum of American Art in New York City.
- November 28 2020 until April 26 - The Motorcycle: Design, Art, Desire at the Gallery of Modern Art in Brisbane, Australia.
- November 28 until April 26, 2021 - The Motorcycle: Design, Art, Desire at the Gallery of Modern Art in Brisbane, Australia.
- December 3 until February 28, 2021 - "Tracey Emin / Edvard Munch: The Loneliness of the Soul" at Royal Academy of Arts in London.
- December 23 until August 16, 2021 - A Romantic Duel: Delacroix's fascination for the Giaour by Lord Byron at the Musée national Eugène-Delacroix in Paris.
- December 30 until April 25, 2021- Museum Power at the National Museum in Kraków, Poland.

== Works ==
- Akse P19 - Mural of Marcus Rashford in Manchester, England
- Ilan Averbuch - Tappan Zee on the Tappan Zee Bridge bike and pedestrian path in South Nyack, New York (sculpture)
- Banksy - Aachoo on Vale Street (allegedly the steepest street in England) in Totterdown, Bristol, England (mural)
- Emma Berger - George Floyd mural, Portland, Oregon, U.S.
- Meredith Bergmann - Women's Rights Pioneers Monument, installed in Central Park in New York City
- Es Devlin and Machiko Weston - I Saw the World End (virtual installation)
- Luciano Garbati - "Medusa with the Head of Perseus" (sculpture / after "Perseus with the Head of Medusa" by Benvenuto Cellini - bronze version) installed in Collect Pond Park across from New York County Criminal Court in Manhattan, New York City
- Jorge Rodriguez-Gerada - Portrait of Dr. Ydelfonso Decoo in Flushing/Corona Park Queens, New York
- Zahrah Al Ghamdi - Glimpses of the Past - Desert X, Al-'Ula
- Raymond Gibby - Statue of a Quarter Pounder
- Jasper Johns with contributions from Margaret Geller and Jéan Marc Togodgue - Slice
- Rashid Johnson - "Untitled Anxious Red Drawings"
- Hannah Levy - Retainer commissioned for the High Line in New York City in 2019, completed in 2020, exhibited 2021-2022
- James Little - Radiant Memories at Jamaica Station in Queens, New York City.
- Scott LoBaido - "THANK YOU" at Elmhurst Hospital in Queens, New York
- Teresa Margolles - El Manto Negro (en. The Black Shroud) (burnished ceramic squares)
- Antonia Papatznaki - Lighthouse permanently installed at Kato Patisia Square Metro Station, Acharnon and Stratigou Kalari Street in Athens, Greece
- Don Perlis - Floyd
- Charles Pétillon Le Phare (The Lighthouse) in Terminal 2E at Charles De Gaulle International Airport
- Jaume Plensa - Water's Soul
- Thomas J. Price - Reaching Out (sculpture)
- Marc Quinn
  - A Surge of Power (Jen Reid) 2020
  - "Viral Paintings"
- The Rebel Bear - "Rotten Apple" (street mural) in Brooklyn, New York City
- Amy Sherald - An Ocean Away
- Chris Soria - The Flux of Being on the Tappan Zee Bridge bike and pedestrian path in South Nyack, New York (mural)
- Sarah Sze - Shorter Than the Day at LaGuardia Airport Terminal B in New York City.
- TeamLab - "Resonanting Life in the Acorn Forest", permanent installation at the Kadokawa Culture Museum in Tokorozawa Sakura Town in Tokorozawa, Japan.
- Cheryl Wing Zi Wong - The Current Keeps on Moving on the Tappan Zee Bridge bike and pedestrian path in Tarrytown, New York (sculpture)
- Dustin Yellin - The Politics of Eternity
- Héctor Zamora - Lattice Detour rooftop installation at the Metropolitan Museum of Art in New York City.
- Nightmare Elk - Portland, Oregon, U.S.
- Black Lives Matter street mural (Capitol Hill, Seattle)
- Black Lives Matter street mural (Cincinnati)
- Black Lives Matter street mural (Indianapolis)
- Black Lives Matter street mural (Portland, Oregon)
- Black Lives Matter street mural (Salt Lake City)
- Black Lives Matter street mural (Santa Cruz, California)
- Black Lives Matter street mural (Springfield, Massachusetts)

== Films ==
- Keith Haring Street Art Boy
- Made You Look
- Spit Earth: Who Is Jordan Wolfson?

== Deaths ==
- January 2 - John Baldessari, 88, American conceptual artist
- January 6 - Akbar Padamsee, 91, Indian painter
- January 13 - André Lufwa, 94, Congolese sculptor (Batteur de tam-tam)
- January 17 - Oswald Oberhuber, 88, Austrian artist
- January 19 - James Mollison, 88, Australian arts administrator, director of the National Gallery of Australia (1971–1989) and the National Gallery of Victoria (1989–1995)
- January 23 - Hester Diamond, 91, American art collector
- January 27 - Jason Polan, 37, American artist
- February 5 - Beverly Pepper, 97, American sculptor
- February 11 - Anne Windfohr Marion, 81, art patron, co-founder of the Georgia O'Keeffe Museum
- February 19 - Jack Youngerman, 93, American artist
- February 20 - Peter Dreher, 87, German painter
- March 2 - Ulay, 76, German artist
- March 11 - John Seward Johnson II, 89, American sculptor and art impresario (Grounds For Sculpture),
- March 15 - Wolf Kahn, 92, German born American artist
- March 23
  - Maurice Berger, 63, American curator and critic
  - Paul Kasmin, 60, American art gallerist
  - Idelle Weber, 88, American pop artist
- March 30 - Dr. Evermor, 81, American sculptor and metal artist (Forevertron, House on the Rock)
- April 1
  - Anne Hendricks Bass, 78, American art collector and patron
  - David Driskell, 89, American visual artist and academic
- April 4 - Alexander Thynn, 7th Marquess of Bath, 87, British painter and aristocrat
- April 5 - Daniel Greene. 85, American portrait artist
- April 6 - Helene Aylon, 89, American painter
- April 8 - Mort Drucker. 91, American cartoonist
- April 11 - Gillian Wise, 84, British artist
- April 13
  - William H. Bailey, 89, American painter
  - Glenna Goodacre, 80, American sculptor (Sacagawea dollar, Vietnam Women's Memorial)
- April 14 - Markus Raetz, 78, Swiss painter, sculptor, and illustrator
- April 19 - Peter Beard, 82, American photographer
- April 21 - Tina Girouard, 73–74, American video and performance artist
- April 25 - Zarina, 83, Indian born American artist
- April 29 - Germano Celant, 80, Italian art historian, curator, and critic
- May 4 - Michael McClure, 87, American Beat poet
- May 9 - Iepe Rubingh, 45, Dutch performance artist, co-founder of chess Boxing
- May 12 - Astrid Kirchherr, 81, German photographer and artist known for her association with the Beatles
- May 16 - Cliff Eyland, 65, Canadian painter and writer
- May 19 - Susan Rothenberg, 75, American painter (death announced on this date)
- May 19 - Richard Anuszkiewicz, 89, American painter, co- founder of the school of and leading practitioner of op art
- May 20 - Emma Amos, 83, American painter
- May 22 - Francine Holley, 100, Belgian painter
- May 26 - Peter Alexander, 82, American sculptor
- May 28 - Gracia Barrios, 92, Chilean painter
- May 31 - Christo, 84, International and American Environmental, Site-Specific, and Land artist
- June 7 - Manuel Felguérez, 91, Mexican artist
- June 13 - Luther Price, 58, American experimental filmmaker and visual artist
- June 18 - Anna Blume, 83, German photographer (Anna and Bernhard Blume)
- June 26
  - Milton Glaser, 91, American graphic designer, creator of the I ❤ NY slogan and co-founder of New York magazine.
  - Benedetto Robazza - Italian sculptor, 88
- July 2 - Jiří T. Kotalík, 69, Czech art historian, rector of the Academy of Fine Arts, Prague (1997–2003, 2010–2014).
- July 12 - Frank Popper, 102, Czech-born Swiss art and technology historian.
- July 13 - Barrie Cook, 91, English abstract painter
- July 15 - George Simon, 73, Guyanese artist
- July 17 - Brigid Berlin, 80, performance artist, photographer, writer, and Warhol superstar
- July 18 - Keith Sonnier, 78, American sculptor
- July 31 - Miodrag Živković, 92, Serbian sculptor
- August 1 - Abdul Hay Mosallam Zarara, 87, Palestinian artist.
- August 3 – Ralf Metzenmacher, 56, German painter
- August 5 - Elmer Petersen, 91, American sculptor (World's Largest Buffalo)
- August 7 - Judit Reigl, 97, Hungarian painter
- August 9 - Frank Wright, 87, American painter
- August 12
  - William Arnett, 81, American art collector and writer
  - Sybil Brintrup, 66, Chilean conceptual artist
- August 13 - Luchita Hurtado, 99, Venezuelan-born American painter
- August 16 - Pierre-Yves Trémois, 99, French artist
- August 18 - Ron Gorchov, 90, American painter
- August 19 - Fern Cunningham, 71, American sculptor
- August 22 - Mrinal Haque, 61, Bangladeshi sculptor
- August 25 - Pedro de Oraá, 88, Cuban painter
- August 26 - Douglas MacDiarmid, 97, New Zealand painter
- August 28
  - Siah Armajani, 81, Iranian-American sculptor
  - Uli Stein, 73, German cartoonist
- August 30 - Jürgen Schadeberg, 89, German-born South African photographer. (death announced on this date)
- September 2 - Philippe Daverio, 70, French-born Italian art critic, gallerist, academic, and television presenter
- September 10
  - Pierre Nahon, 84, Algerian born French art collector and gallery owner
  - Franco Maria Ricci, 82, Italian art publisher and magazine editor
- September 20 - Donald Kendall, 99, American corporate executive and founder of the Donald M. Kendall Sculpture Gardens at PepsiCo headquarters in Purchase, New York
- September 24 - Robert Bechtle, 88, American painter
- October 4 - Kenzō Takada, 81, Japanese-French fashion designer and painter
- October 8 - Geoffrey Dyer, 73, Australian artist
- October 13
  - Jean Cardot, 90, French sculptor
  - Chris Killip, 74, Manx photographer
- October 14 - David Geiser, 72, American painter
- October 20 - Lea Vergine, 84, Italian art critic and curator
- October 25 - Diane Di Prima, 86, American Beat poet
- October 28 - Mohammed Melehi, 83 Moroccan painter
- October 29 - Sindika Dokolo, 48, Congolese art collector and businessman
- November 6 - Piero Simondo, 92, Italian artist
- November 12 - Aldo Tambellini, 90, Italian-American artist
- November 17 - Sheldon Solow, 92, American art collector
- November 20 - Daniel Cordier, 100, French art dealer
- November 22 - Helen LaFrance, 101, American outsider artist
- November 29 - Suh Se-ok, 91, South Korean artist
- December 5 - Jackie Saccoccio, 56, American painter
- December 15 - James Havard, 83, American painter
- December 25 - Barbara Rose, 84, American art critic
- December 28 - David Medalla, 82, Filipino sculptor
