= Black Lives Matter (disambiguation) =

Black Lives Matter is a political and social movement protesting racism and police brutality against black people.

Black Lives Matter may also refer to:

- Black Lives Matter Global Network Foundation, an organization dedicated to activism activities in the Black Lives Matter movement

== Arts, entertainment, and media ==
=== Music ===
- "Black Lives Matter", a 2020 single by BeBe Winans
- "Black Lives Matter", a 2020 single by Dax (rapper)

=== Street art ===
- Black Lives Matter Plaza, a pedestrian street in Washington, District of Columbia, United States
- Black Lives Matter street mural (Capitol Hill, Seattle), Washington, United States
- Black Lives Matter street mural (Cincinnati), Ohio, United States
- Black Lives Matter street mural (Indianapolis), Indiana, United States
- Black Lives Matter street mural (Portland, Oregon), United States
- Black Lives Matter street mural (Salt Lake City), Utah, United States
- Black Lives Matter street mural (Santa Cruz, California), United States
- Black Lives Matter street mural (Seattle City Hall), Washington, United States
- Black Lives Matter street mural (Springfield, Massachusetts), United States

== See also ==
- United States racial unrest (2020–2023)
- BLM (disambiguation)
