= Murals of Springfield, Massachusetts =

The American city of Springfield, Massachusetts has been home to many public murals since the mid-20th century. In the 1970s, African-American muralist Nelson Stevens led the creation of more than 30 murals in the city. Many of the city's 20th-century murals later fell into disrepair, but interest in murals has increased since the 2010, and local organizations have created dozens of new murals across the city.

== 20th century ==
In 1910, American painter Robert Reid installed a mural at Central High School, entitled "The Light of Education". The mural depicted William Pynchon and the settling of Springfield.

In 1937, Italian-born artist Umberto Romano and his students installed a six panel mural in the Springfield Main Post Office (now the Commonwealth of Massachusetts State Office Building) depicting the history of Springfield up to 1936.

In 1943, painter Sante Graziani won a content by the Springfield Museums to design a mural for the Fine Arts Museum. The mural was painted in 1947.

The oldest public mural in the city is Heritage, painted in the early 1970s by local artists Don Blanton, Paul Blanton, and Josephine Edmonds. It was painted on the side of Robbins Beauty Supply on State Street. The three wanted to create a piece of public art celebrating Black heritage and pride. Beginning in 1973, artist Nelson Stevens led the creation of more than 30 murals in the city, many of which were created in collaboration with students and local artists. Four of these murals were painted in the Winchester Square Historic District.

== 21st century ==
Between 2010 and 2023, the organization City Mosaic created between 40 and 50 murals in the city, with support from the Springfield government. They first began painting murals during the Springfield Jazz and Roots Festival.

In 2019, the organization Fresh Paint Springfield also began painting murals, many of them during their annual mural festival in June. The 2022 iteration of the festival, which included collaborations with Commonwealth Murals, resulted in 38 new murals. In August 2022, the city government announced they would be offering grants to organizations looking to paint murals in the city.

== List of murals ==
Year	Name	Subject	Artist/s	Location	Notes	Ref
1910	The Light of Education	Springfield history	Robert Reid	Central High School	since removed	
1937		Springfield history	Umberto Romano	Commonwealth of Massachusetts State Office Building		
1947		Arts in Springfield	Sante Graziani	D'Amour Museum of Fine Arts		
	Heritage		Don Blanton, Paul Blanton, and Josephine Edmonds	State Street	repainted 2021	
1974	Tribute to Black Women	Black women	Nelson Stevens	Catharine Street	repainted 2022	
1974	Wall of Black Music	Black musicians	Nelson Stevens	Montorse Street	repainted 2022	
1974	The Old, the Young, the Beautiful		Nelson Stevens	African Diaspora Mental Health Association, State Street	repainted 2024 by Jasmine Thomas (Commonwealth Murals)	
		Dr. Seuss characters	City Mosaic	State Street underpass		
2015	There's No Place Like Springfield	Wizard of Oz characters	John Simpson	State Street	removed 2020	
2017		Milton Bradley	Kim Carlino	AW Gifford building on Lyman Street		
2019			Ryan Murray	Springfield Union Station		
2019		Travis Best	Damien Mitchell	State Street		
2020	Black Lives Matter	Victims of police brutality		Court Street		
2020	Say Their Names	Victims of police brutality	Wane One and Souls NYC	Mason Square		
2021				Mason Square Library		
2021	Wall of Fame			State Street and Eastern Avenue		
2021	Gardening the Community		Ryan Murrary	Mason Square		
2022	Wall of Advertising	Vintage advertisements	City Mosaic and John Simpson	Worthington Street		
2023			Carmen Callender	Park Cleaners, Orange and Allen Street		
2023	Be the Bridge		GoodSpace Murals	Plainfield Street		
2023		Climate justice	Betsy Casanas			
2023		Miguel 'Pico de Oro' González	Vincent Ballentine	Jefferson Avenue		
2023		Ruth Carter	Commonwealth Murals	Rebecca Johnson School		
2023		Springfield history	City Mosaic	Bridge Street		
2024	The Madonna of Springfield	Italian-American and Puerto Rican-American culture	Nico Cathcart	Mount Carmel Society building, Winthrop Street		
2024			Self, Commonwealth Murals	YMCA, Dwight Street		
2024		Milagros Terry Rodriguez		New North Citizens Council, Main Street		
