= Kevin McNulty =

Kevin McNulty is the name of:

- Kevin McNulty (actor) (born 1955), Canadian actor
- Kevin McNulty (judge) (born 1954), American federal judge, U.S. District Court for the District of New Jersey
