= Gibbons P.C. =

U.S. law firm

- No. of offices: 8
- No. of attorneys: 170
- Major practice areas: Business & Commercial Litigation; Corporate; Employment & Labor Law; Environmental; Financial Restructuring & Creditors’ Rights; Government & Regulatory Affairs; Intellectual Property; Products Liability; Real Property; White Collar & Investigations
- Key people: Peter J. Torcicollo, Managing Director
- Revenue: ▲$102.4M (2016)
- Profit per equity partner: ▲$790 000 (2022)
- Date founded: 1926
- Founder: Andrew Crummy
- Company type: Professional Corporation
- Website: www.gibbonslaw.com

Gibbons P.C. was a mid-sized U.S. law firm with approximately 170 lawyers and offices in Newark, Trenton, and Red Bank, New Jersey; New York, New York; Philadelphia, Pennsylvania; Wilmington, Delaware; Washington, DC; and West Palm Beach, Florida. In February 2026, Gibbons combined with Frost Brown Todd to form FBT Gibbons.

The firm's nine "umbrella" practice groups included Commercial & Criminal Litigation, Corporate, Employment & Labor Law, Environmental, Financial Restructuring & Creditors' Rights, Government & Regulatory Affairs, Intellectual Property, Products Liability, and Real Property. Under these umbrella groups are sub-groups; for example, Tax within Corporate and Trademark within Intellectual Property. Additional practice groups include Electronic Discovery & Information Management Counseling and Privacy & Data Security.

Gibbons was best known for its Litigation Department, tackling disputes in areas ranging from commercial and white collar crime to environmental and healthcare.

== History ==
The firm was founded in 1926 by Andrew Crummy, a World War I veteran who attended New York University and Harvard Law School. After working as an IRS agent, he formed a law partnership with fellow attorney Adam Rossbach that was originally called Crummy & Rossbach. Following Rossbach's passing in the mid-1930s, Crummy later partnered with William Consodine in 1945 to form Crummy & Consodine. When John Joseph Gibbons, for whom the firm is currently named, in 1950, its name changed to Crummy, Consodine & Gibbons. Gibbons left in 1970 when he was appointed to the United States Court of Appeals for the Third Circuit. Upon his return in 1990, the firm became known as Gibbons, Del Deo, Dolan, Griffinger & Vecchione, ultimately shortening its name to Gibbons P.C. in 2007.

The firm opened its New York office in 1997; Trenton in 2002; Philadelphia in 2005; Wilmington in 2007; Washington, DC, and West Palm Beach in 2018; and Red Bank in 2019.

In February 2022, Gibbons reorganized its firm management structure, dividing the role of Chairman and Managing Director. Patrick C. Dunican Jr. was named Executive Chairperson after serving as the firm's Chairman and Managing Director for nearly two decades. Peter J. Torcicollo, who had been a member and ultimately co-chair of Gibbons' Commercial & Criminal Litigation Group since 1993, assumed the Managing Director role.

== Recognition ==
The New Jersey Law Journal has awarded Gibbons a "Litigation Practice of the Year" designation five times in recent years, in the employment, class actions, products liability, and commercial litigation categories and with the overall "General Litigation Practice of the Year" honor. In addition, the Gibbons Government & Regulatory Affairs Group, based in its Trenton office, was the top lawyer-lobbying firm by revenue in the state of New Jersey in 2023, the fifteenth consecutive year the firm achieved that rank.

== Notable lawyers and alumni ==
- John Joseph Gibbons, former judge on the United States Court of Appeals for the Third Circuit
- James R. Zazzali, former Chief Justice of the Supreme Court of New Jersey.
- Jonathan Hafetz, one of the Guantanamo Bay attorneys, was a Gibbons Fellow before joining the Brennan Center for Justice at New York University School of Law.
- Kevin McNulty, Judge of the United States District Court for the District of New Jersey
- Edwin H. Stern, Acting Justice on the New Jersey Supreme Court (Judge of the Appellate Division, Temporarily Assigned to the Supreme Court).

== See also ==
- List of Harvard Law School alumni
- List of largest United States-based law firms by profits per partner
- White shoe firm
- Corporated law firm
