= Umberto Romano =

Umberto Romano may refer to:

- Umberto Romano (footballer) (born 1973), Swiss footballer of Italian descent
- Umberto Romano (artist) (1906–1982), Italian-born American painter
