= Black Lives Matter art =

Related artworks

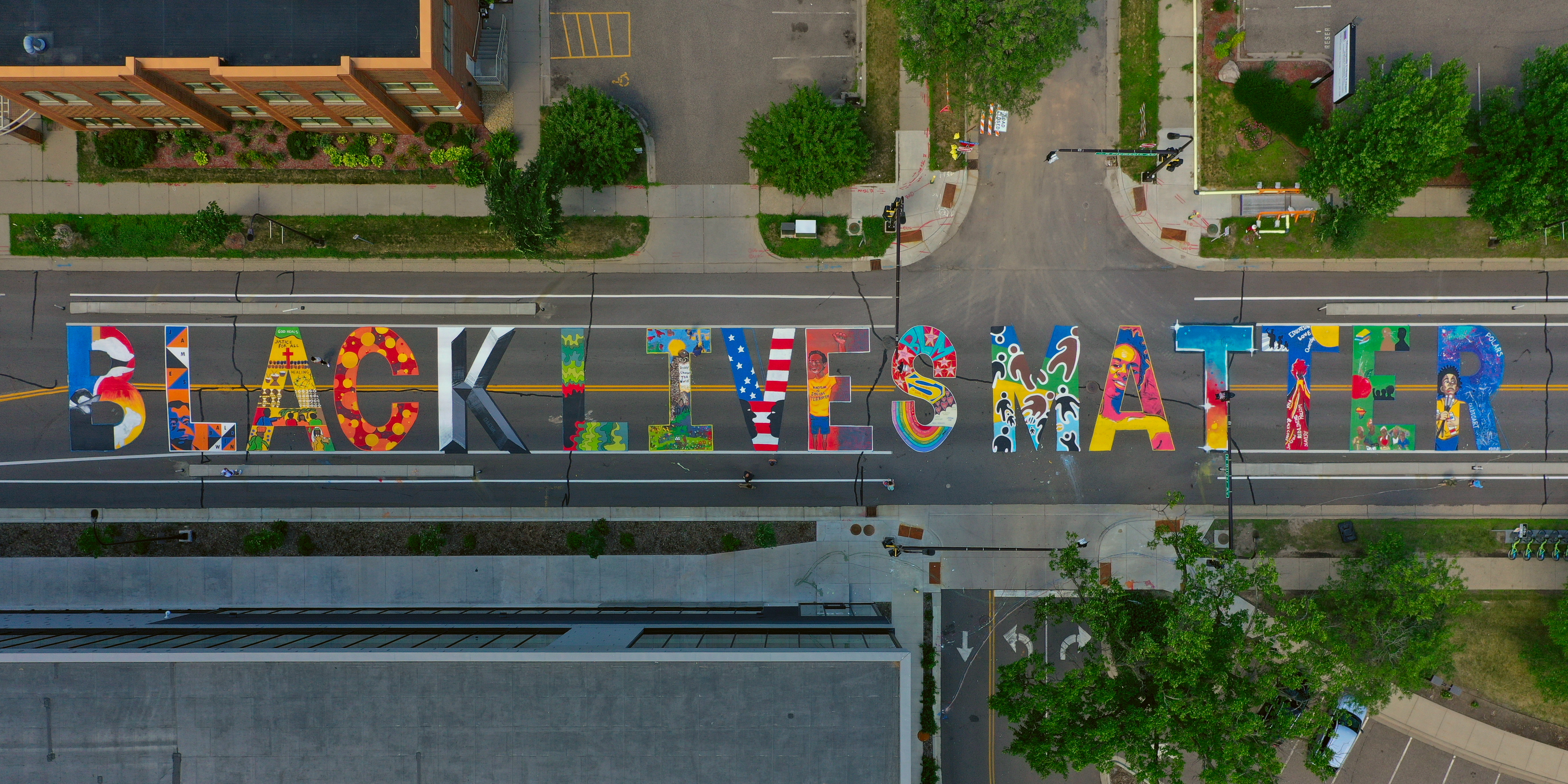
Black Lives Matter mural in Minneapolis, July 2020

Many artworks related to the Black Lives Matter movement have been created. These works are either seen as a direct tribute to those who have died or more broadly to the movement. Often the pieces are created in the streets as to be more publicly visible. As such several attempts have been made at preserving the art created in protest on the basis of their artistic merit and cultural significance. Increasingly, the erasure of the artwork has been a problem for preservationists. As such, the artworks below represent a fraction of the works created.

== Murals ==
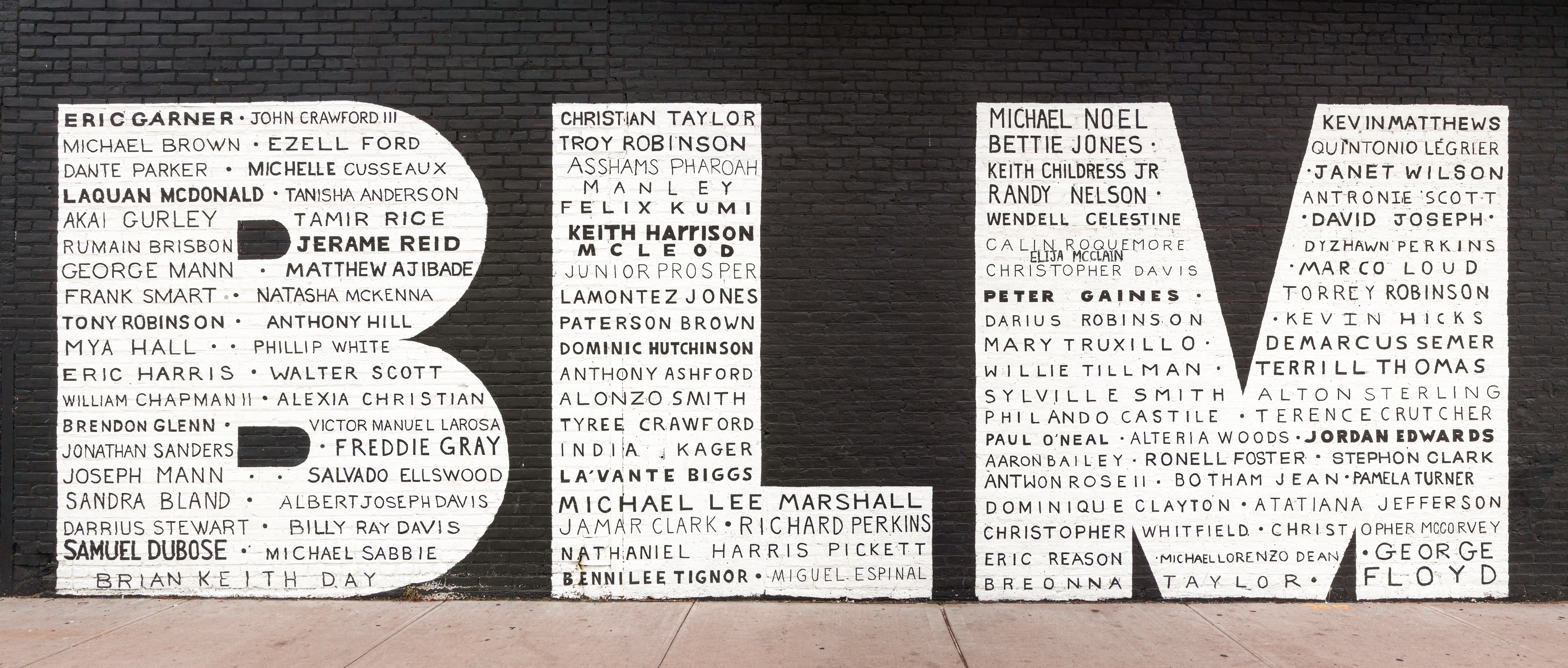
BLM mural in Greenpoint, Brooklyn

Say Their Names was painted in Louisville, Kentucky. In Portland, Oregon, the George Floyd mural and We Stand with You were created.

=== Street murals ===
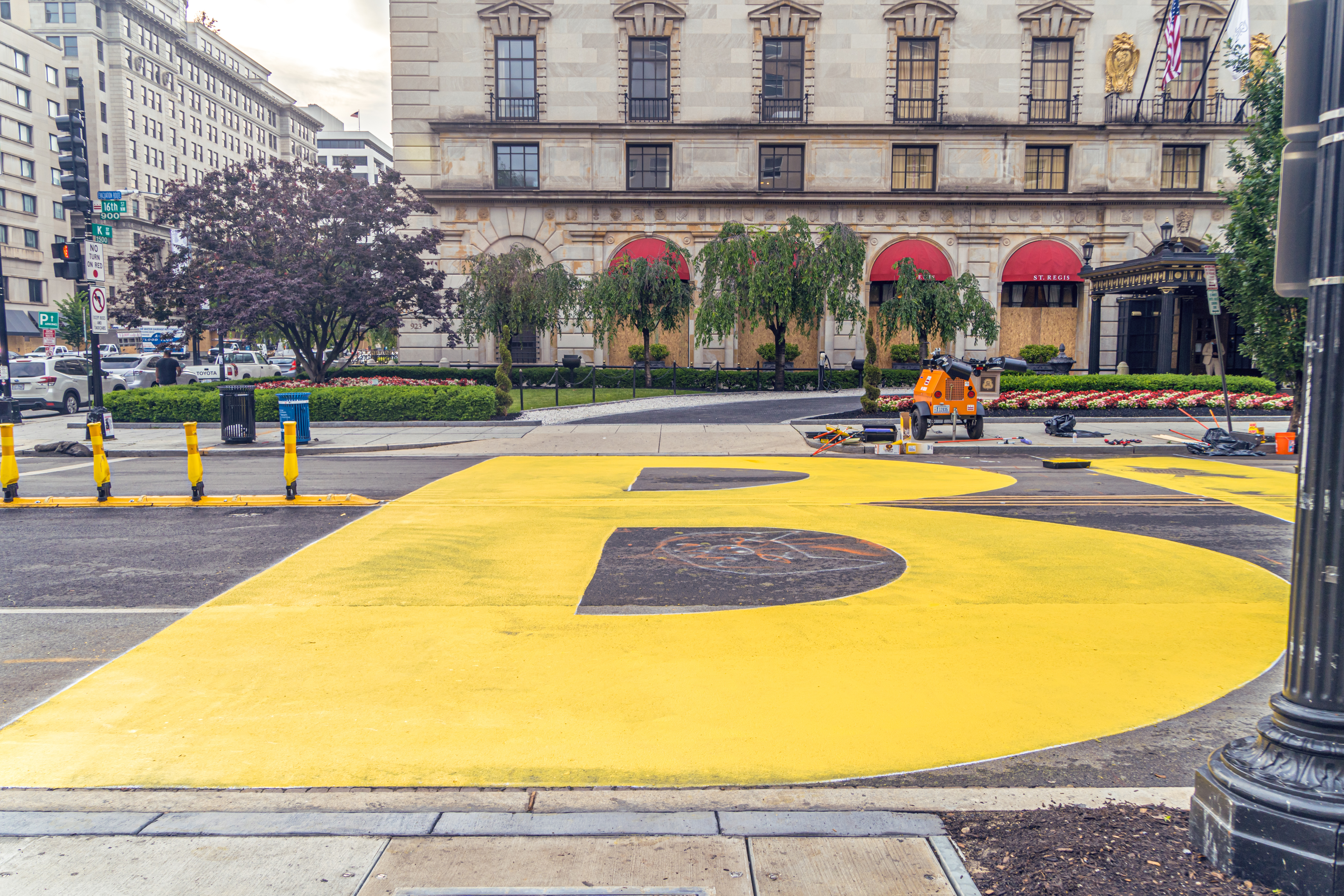
The Washington, D.C. Black Lives Matter mural painted in June 2020

On June 5, 2020, during the George Floyd protests, the DC Public Works Department painted the words "Black Lives Matter" in 35-foot-tall (11 m) yellow capital letters on 16th Street NW on the north of Lafayette Square, part of President's Park near the White House, with the assistance of the MuralsDC program of the DC Department of Public Works, with the DC flag accompanying the text. This would eventually cause the renaming of 16th street NW to Black Lives Matter Plaza. Multiple other cities across the United States, Canada and the United Kingdom, subsequently painted similar murals, including Cincinnati, Indianapolis, Portland, Salt Lake City, Santa Cruz, California, and Springfield, Massachusetts.

== Painting ==
In response to the 2020 killing of Breonna Taylor, artist Amy Sherald created a painted portrait simply titled Breonna Taylor. The portrait features Taylor in a turquoise dress with a cross necklace and a diamond engagement ring. Sherald created the portrait using oil paints on a 54" x 43" linen canvas. In 2021, the piece was included in a Speed Art Museum exhibition titled "Promise, Witness, Remembrance", which was curated by Allison Glenn.

In response to the 2013 killing of Trayvon Martin, artist Nikkolas Smith created a painted portrait of Martin Luther King Jr. wearing a hoodie purposefully resembling the same hoodie donned by Trayvon Martin at the time of his death.

Adrian Brandon created a series of portraits titled "Stolen", each one being a Black individual who had their life taken. He chose to only paint the portraits for the same number of minutes as years each individual lived. The empty white spaces represent the life they will never be able to live.

In November 2014, visual artist and illustrator Cbabi Bayoc painted RIP Son using acrylic on a 4-by-4-foot (1.2 m × 1.2 m) panel. Bayoc's art contribution was done in response to the grand jury decision to acquit officer Darren Wilson who was involved in the fatal shooting of Ferguson teen Michael Brown.

== Sculpture ==
A bust and statue of George Floyd were installed in New York City and Newark, New Jersey, respectively.

A bust of Breonna Taylor was installed in Oakland, California, in 2020. A bust of John Lewis was displayed in Union Square, New York City.

These sculptures sometimes replace statues of controversial nature, such as a sculpture by Marc Quinn, which replaced a statue of Edward Colston in Bristol. The work is called A Surge of Power, and features Jen Reid with a fist raised.

== Performance art ==
Performance art has been connected with the Black Lives Matter movement since the beginning, given Patrisse Cullors' ties to the movement's inception.

== Symbol ==
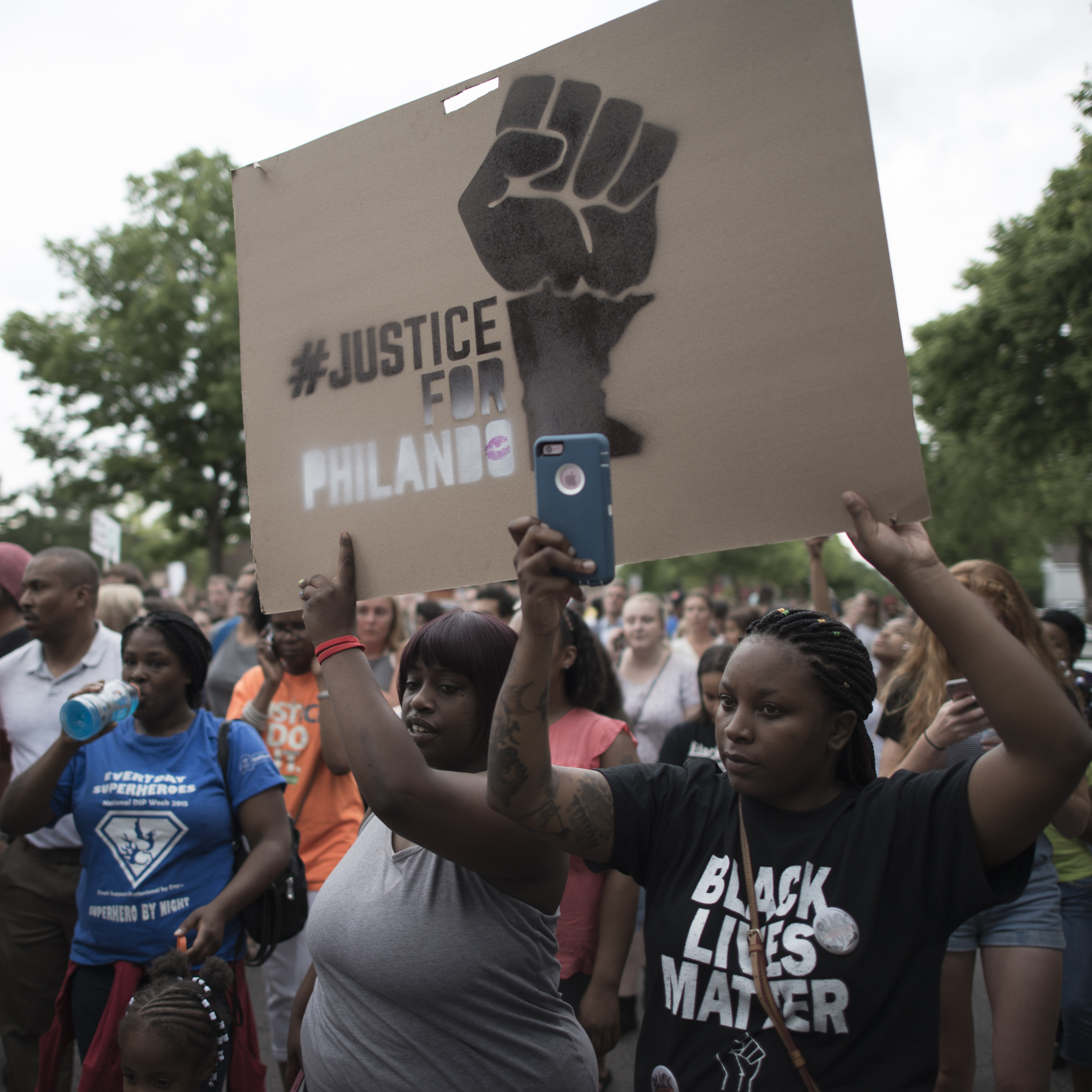
The Black Lives Matter symbol

The Black Lives Matter symbol is artwork depicting a raised fist, a universal symbol for solidarity. Its connections with the movement stems from The Black Panther Party, in which it has become embedded with anti-racist protests. The raised fist symbol became the official gesture for the movement after the shooting of Michael Brown, an African-American teenager, in 2014.

== Reception ==
The surrounding works of the Black Lives Matter movement have a majority positive public reception in the United States. Despite this, several instances of art vandalism have occurred. These have generally been regarded as hate crimes depending on the notoriety of the work.

The murals found in schools have had a mixed reaction from parents, teachers, and administration depending on the work. Questions have been raised as to whom should be creating the art from an ethnographic perspective. Another source of controversy is the use of a victim's likeness in derivative art.

Critical and academic reception of the art has been highly positive, prompting anthropological journalism and investigations into the artists' works.
