= Edward S. Kiel =

American judge (born 1965)

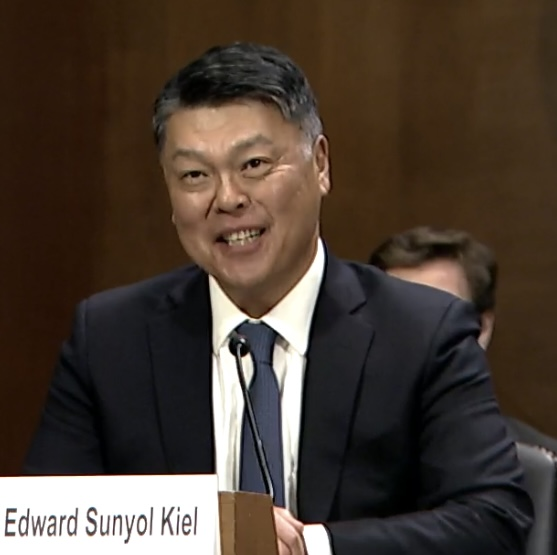

Judge of the United States District Court for the District of New Jersey
- Incumbent
- Assumed office March 25, 2024
- Appointed by: Joe Biden
- Preceded by: Kevin McNulty

Magistrate Judge of the United States District Court for the District of New Jersey
- In office July 16, 2019 – March 25, 2024
- Succeeded by: Stacey D. Adams

Personal details
- Born: Sun Yol Kiel (길선열); 1965 (age 60–61) Daegu, South Korea
- Education: Rutgers University (BA, BS); University of Notre Dame (JD)

Edward Sunyol Kiel (born 1965) is an American lawyer who has served as a United States district judge of the United States District Court for the District of New Jersey since 2024. He previously served as a United States magistrate judge of the same court from 2019 to 2024.

== Education ==
Kiel received a Bachelor of Arts and Bachelor of Science in electrical engineering from Rutgers University in 1988 and a Juris Doctor from Notre Dame Law School in 1991.

== Career ==
From 1991 to 1992, Kiel served as a law clerk for Presiding Criminal Judge Michael R. Imbriani of the Somerset County Superior Court. From 1992 to 1994, he was an associate with Jamieson Moore Peskin & Spicer in Princeton, from 1994 to 1998 with Beattie Padovano in Montvale and from 1998 to 2001 with Cole Schotz in Hackensack. He later served as partner at Cole Schotz from 2001 to 2019. In 2023, Kiel had been under consideration for appointment to the Supreme Court of New Jersey by Governor Phil Murphy.

=== Federal judicial service ===
From 2019 to 2024, Kiel served as a United States magistrate judge of the United States District Court for the District of New Jersey.

On October 4, 2023, President Joe Biden nominated Kiel to serve as a United States district judge of the United States District Court for the District of New Jersey. Kiel was recommended to the Biden administration by Senators Cory Booker and Bob Menendez. President Biden nominated Kiel to the seat being vacated by Judge Kevin McNulty, who subsequently assumed senior status on October 31, 2023. On November 1, 2023, a hearing on his nomination was held before the Senate Judiciary Committee. During his confirmation hearing, he was questioned by Republican senators over his views on the Gaza war and antisemitism on college campuses. Kiel previously worked with the Asian American Legal Defense and Education Fund, a group which senator Josh Hawley said had "recently released controversial statements supporting Palestine. On November 30, 2023, his nomination was reported out of committee by a party line 11–10 vote. On January 3, 2024, his nomination was returned to the president under Rule XXXI, Paragraph 6 of the United States Senate and he was renominated on January 8, 2024. On January 18, 2024, his nomination was reported out of committee by an 11–10 party-line vote. On March 20, 2024, the Senate invoked cloture on his nomination by a 50–48 vote. Later that day, his nomination was confirmed by a 50–49 vote. He received his judicial commission on March 25, 2024.

In 2025 he dismissed a lawsuit from a civilian engineer after it was determined that her report of being raped in her bed aboard a Navy transport ship was within her duties and must be treated as a worker's comp claim.

== Personal ==
Kiel emigrated from South Korea.

== See also ==
- List of Asian American jurists

Legal offices
Preceded by Kevin McNulty	Judge of the United States District Court for the District of New Jersey; 2024–present	Incumbent
