= Bust of George Floyd =

2021 bust in New York, United States

- Union Square, 2021
- Artist: Chris Carnabuci
- Year: 2021
- Medium: Wood
- Subject: George Floyd
- Dimensions: 1.8 m (6 ft)
- Location: Manhattan, New York, U.S.; 40.6333°N 73.9479°W

The bust of George Floyd is a sculpture of George Floyd (1973–2020), an African-American man who was murdered by a police officer during his arrest in Minneapolis. Initially situated in the Flatbush neighborhood of Brooklyn, New York, it is currently displayed in Union Square, Manhattan.

The sculpture sits on a marble base, with the 6-foot (1.8 m) bust being made of layers of CNC-cut okoumé plywood. It was created by artist Chris Carnabuci and unveiled by Floyd's brother Terrence, as part of the 2021 Juneteenth federal holiday, saying "My brother was the sacrifice, so I need y'all to continue to pay attention and keep my big brother's name ringing in the ears of everyone." It was moved to Manhattan on 1 October 2021 and displayed next to busts of Breonna Taylor and John Lewis. Each bust is part of the See in Justice public art exhibition.

== Vandalism ==
The sculpture was vandalized days after it was unveiled with "PATRIOTFRONT.US", the website of Patriot Front, spray painted on the base of the sculpture. According to the Southern Poverty Law Center (SPLC), Patriot Front is a white nationalist hate group. On June 25, 2021, the New York City Police Department (NYPD) stated that they were investigating the incident as a hate crime.

Two days after it was moved to Union Square, the bust was vandalized with grey paint.

== See also ==
- Black Lives Matter art
- Memorials to George Floyd
