= Black Lives Matter street mural (Cincinnati) =

Mural in Cincinnati, Ohio, U.S.

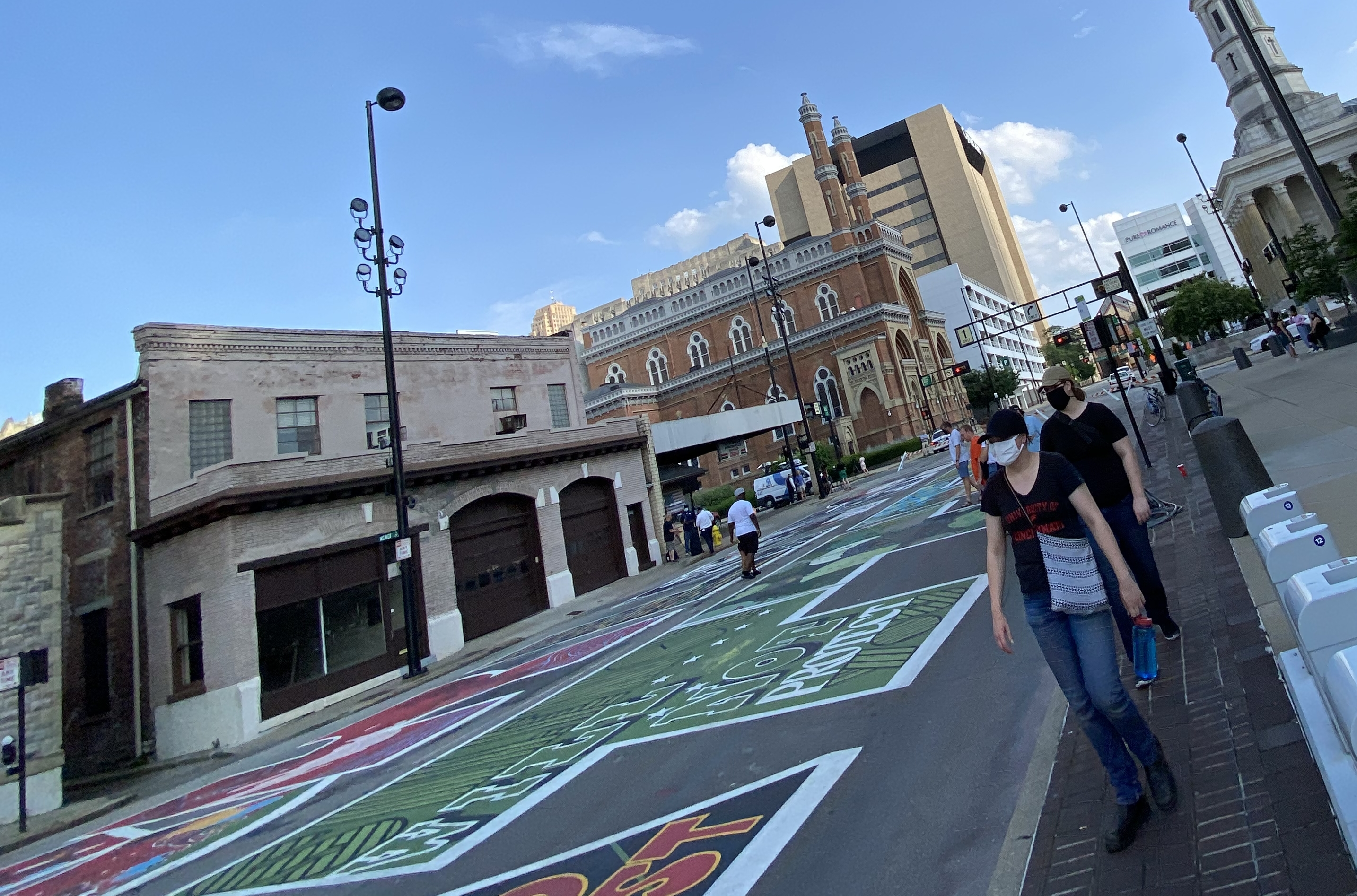
- The mural in June 2020
- Year: 2020
- Location: Cincinnati, Ohio, United States; 39.1044°N 84.5188°W

A "Black Lives Matter" street mural has been painted in Cincinnati, in the U.S. state of Ohio.

The mural appears on Plum Street between Eighth and Ninth streets.

== History ==
Black Art Speaks, ArtsWave, and ArtWorks painted the mural in front of the Cincinnati City Hall in June 2020.

Plans for a $118,000 restoration were confirmed in June 2021. Black Art Speaks completed the restoration. City manager Paula Boggs Muething recommended using $250,000 in federal stimulus money from the American Rescue Plan to fund the project. Cincinnati City Council approved spending $125,000. Some streets were closed during the renovation. A block party was held on the site.

== See also ==
- 2020 in art
- Black Lives Matter art
