= Quarter Pounder statue =

Sculpture in Rapid City, South Dakota

Statue of a Quarter Pounder
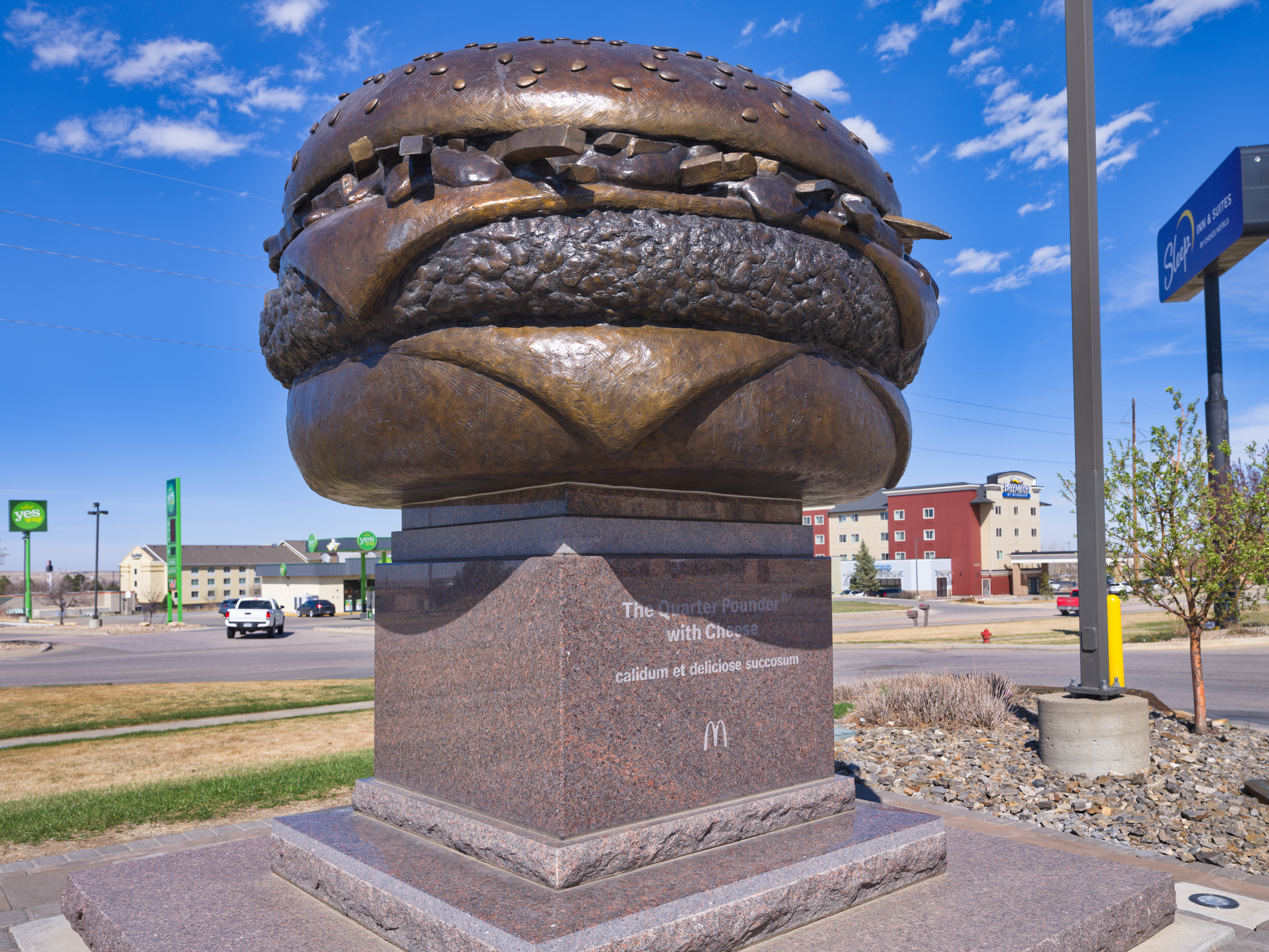
- Interactive map of Statue of a Quarter Pounder
- Location: 3919 Cheyenne Boulevard; Rapid City, South Dakota, United States
- Coordinates: 44°5′44.5″N 103°9′1″W
- Designer: Raymond Gibby of Gibby Bronze, LLC
- Fabricator: Bott Monument (pedestal)
- Material: Bronze; Granite
- Length: 8 feet (2.4 m)
- Width: 8 feet (2.4 m)
- Height: 9 feet (2.7 m)
- Dedicated date: February 26, 2020
- Dedicated to: Quarter Pounders

A statue of a Quarter Pounder With Cheese stands outside a McDonald's restaurant in Rapid City, South Dakota, United States. The statue was erected in 2020 in honor of the 50th anniversary of the Quarter Pounder, and a McDonald's representative said Rapid City was selected for "having the most Quarter Pounder with Cheese fans per capita".

== History ==
In February 2020, in honor of the 50th anniversary of the Quarter Pounder being introduced at McDonald's, the fast food chain created the Quarter Pounder Fan Club and began selling merchandise based on the burger, including Quarter Pounder-scented candles, t-shirts, and stickers. Additionally, the company announced that one city in the United States would be home to a bronze statue of the burger. Ultimately, Rapid City, South Dakota was chosen as the site for this monument, beating other contending cities in Hawaii, North Dakota, and Wyoming. According to a McDonald's representative, the city was chosen because it had "the most Quarter Pounder with Cheese fans per capita". Additionally, Rapid City is known for its several monuments. City council member Darla Drew unveiled the statue on February 26, 2020 (Ash Wednesday) outside the McDonald's located along Cheyenne Boulevard, near Interstate 90 in South Dakota. This particular McDonald's was chosen due to its large parking lot and closeness to the Interstate. As part of the dedication ceremony, 500 Quarter Pounders were given away for free at the location.

The statue was designed by Raymond Gibby, while the pedestal was created by Bott Monument of Riverton, Wyoming. The monument took over 1,800 hours to create.

== Design ==
The statue stands 9 feet (2.7 m) tall and 8 feet (2.4 m) wide. The bronze statue rests on a granite pedestal which bears the phrase "hot and deliciously juicy" in Latin. Each of the sesame seeds on the statue's top bun are approximately 20 times the size of a regular seed. The combined statue and pedestal weigh 23,000 pounds (10,000 kg).

== See also ==
- 2020 in art
- Novelty architecture
