= Jonathan Hafetz =

American lawyer and writer

Jonathan Hafetz is an American lawyer and writer.

== Career ==
Hafetz is professor of law at Seton Hall Law School. He formerly worked as a senior attorney for the National Security Project of the American Civil Liberties Union. He has also served as a lawyer for Ali Saleh Kahlah al-Marri, who from 2003 to 2008, was the sole enemy combatant held in extrajudicial detention in the continental USA. Prior to his career at the ACLU, Hafetz served as litigation director for the Liberty and National Security Project at the Brennan Center for Justice at NYU School of Law and as a Gibbons fellow in public interest and constitutional law at Gibbons, P.C. He was also a law clerk to both Jed S. Rakoff of the U.S. District Court for the Southern District of New York, and Sandra L. Lynch of the U.S. Court of Appeals for the First Circuit. Hafetz is a graduate of Yale Law School. From 2014-15, Hafetz was a visiting professor in the law and public affairs program at Princeton University.

On June 20, 2008 the Associated Press reported that government officials wanted to "rewrite detainee evidence". The impetus to rewrite the evidence is a reaction to the Supreme Court's June 12, 2008 ruling on Boumediene v. Bush. The Supreme Court had ruled that Guantanamo captives were entitled to challenge the basis for their detention through the US justice system, because the Combatant Status Review Tribunals were not an adequate substitute for habeas corpus. According to the article:

At a closed-door meeting with judges and defense attorneys this week, government lawyers said they needed time to add new evidence and make other changes to evidentiary documents known as 'factual returns.'

The Associated Press quoted Hafetz reaction to this development.

It's a totally fishy maneuver that suggests that the government wants, at the 11th hour, to get its ducks in a row.
