= Jackie Saccoccio =

American abstract painter (1963–2020)

- Born: December 16, 1963; Providence, Rhode Island, United States
- Died: December 4, 2020 (aged 56); Manhattan, New York, United States
- Known for: Gestural abstraction
- Notable work: Degree of Tilt (2015); Apocalypse Confetti (2017); Tempest (2019)
- Style: Abstract paintings with emphasis on large canvases, bright colors, broad strokes, and deliberate randomness
- Movement: Abstract expressionism

Jackie Saccoccio (December 16, 1963 – December 4, 2020) was an American abstract painter. Her works, considered examples of gestural abstraction, featured bright color, large canvases, and deliberately introduced randomness.

Saccoccio's works have been displayed at the Metropolitan Museum of Art in New York, Museum of Contemporary Art, Chicago, and the Museum of Fine Art in Boston. She received the New Art Dealers Alliance (NADA) Artadia award in 2015 and was also awarded grants from the Fulbright–Hays Program (1990), John Simon Guggenheim Memorial Foundation (2000), and the American Academy in Rome.

== Early life ==
A third-generation Italian-American, Jackie Saccoccio was born on December 16, 1963, to Anna (née DiSanto) and Harry Saccoccio, in Cranston, Rhode Island. Her father was a businessman and her mother a homemaker. She was the youngest of three children.

As a student at the Rhode Island School of Design (RISD), Saccoccio initially studied architecture before switching over to painting. She went on to study in Rome in 1983, and would make several subsequent visits to Italy on scholarships and grants from the Fulbright–Hays Program (1990), John Simon Guggenheim Memorial Foundation (2000), and American Academy in Rome (2004). She worked for an antiques dealer in Cambridge, Massachusetts, for a year after graduating with a Bachelor of Fine Arts degree from RISD. She went on to get a Master of Fine Arts degree from the School of the Art Institute of Chicago.

== Works ==
=== Style ===
Starting in the 1990s, Saccoccio was known for her vivid and evocative works of gestural abstraction, building on the work of artists like Helen Frankenthaler and Joan Mitchell. Her works, inspired by abstract expressionism and Italian Baroque art, were part of a movement which emphasized adding vitality to abstract painting through experimentation with randomness and paint handling. Jerry Saltz, reviewing a 2007 show in The Village Voice, noted Saccoccio's influences: "Saccoccio's paintings come dangerously close to looking like mid-century abstraction, particularly the work of artists like Joan Mitchell and de Kooning. Yet if you spend time in this show, the old-school quotient subsides and sparks begin to fly."

Saccoccio worked with large canvases on which she outlaid "expansive waves and splashes of bright, luminous color", creating fragmented visual spaces. She introduced randomness in her works by pouring and splattering paint while tilting the canvas in different directions. She also transferred paint between canvases, pulled them across, and scraped through dry paint pigments to add onto the randomness. In what has been described as an intensely physical process, she would sometimes press together two large and wet canvases, apply mica for an additional layer of sheen, and at times have as many as 50 layers of paint on her canvas. These actions, and the added bright colors, introduced an additional element of spontaneity to her works. The outcome was highly layered, vibrantly colored, drip-networked, and had large shifting fields of color. In a review of a 2014 exhibit, The New York Times art critic Martha Schwendener wrote that her "recent paintings look as if they were blasted onto the canvas".

Starting in 2008, Saccoccio focused on a style of painting featuring abstractions with amorphous blobs of paint resting on top of grids of paintings. Calling them "portraits", she focused on creating a hovering effect in her paintings. In an interview with Elle, she mentioned that she wanted to communicate the idea of impermanence by making the painting, a static object, appear like it was moving.

=== Exhibitions ===
Her last exhibition, Femme Brut, opened in January 2020 at Van Doren Waxter, a gallery in uptown Manhattan which had represented her since 2008, and at Chart, a gallery in Tribeca. The exhibit focused on the theme of seduction and was inspired by William Shakespeare's The Tempest and Gustave Courbet's The Source of the Loue (1864), a pairing that called for classical references for modern works. Some of the paintings exhibited in Femme Brut included La Source de la Loue (2019), The Tempest (concave), and The Tempest (convex). Saccoccio noted that, in addition to visual artists like Piet Mondrian, Helen Frankenthaler, Gerhard Richter, Katharina Grosse, and Jackson Pollock, she drew inspiration from fields like film, literature, and sculpture, including from authors such as Shakespeare, Vladimir Nabokov, and Haruki Murakami. The name of the exhibition alluded to French painter Jean Dubuffet's Art Brut movement, which focused on raw and emotional work made by artists outside of the mainstream art world.

Some of her other notable works included Degree of Tilt (2015), Apocalypse Confetti (2017), and Tempest (2019). Her paintings were often named after plays like Shakespeare's The Tempest or movies like the Hong Kong-based filmmaker Wong Kar-wai's Chungking Express. Her works are displayed at the Metropolitan Museum of Art in New York, Museum of Contemporary Art, Chicago, Museum of Fine Art in Boston, Dallas Museum of Art, and Saatchi Gallery, London. In addition, her works were exhibited in Italy, Belgium, Germany, the Netherlands, and China. She had her studio in West Cornwall, Connecticut.

== Awards ==
Saccoccio was the recipient of the 2015 New Art Dealers Alliance (NADA) Artadia award. In the citation, the committee drew attention to her "substantial, complex and accomplished painting". She had also received grants from the Fulbright-Hays foundation (1990), John Simon Guggenheim Memorial Foundation (2000), the Rome Prize from the American Academy in Rome (2004), and a Civitella Ranieri Fellowship.

== Personal life ==
Saccoccio met her husband, Carl D'Alvia, when she was a student at the Rhode Island School of Design. The couple were married in 1992 and had a daughter. They lived in West Cornwall, Connecticut. She died on December 4, 2020, aged 56, in Manhattan, from cancer, which she had had for five years.
