= FBT Gibbons =

American law firm

- Headquarters: 400 West Market; Louisville, Kentucky
- No. of offices: 26
- No. of attorneys: 800+
- Major practice areas: General practice
- Key people: Robert Sartin (Chairman), Adam Hall (Co-Managing Partner), Peter Torcicollo (Co-Managing Partner), Truda Chow (Chief Operating Officer)
- Date founded: 1919
- Company type: LLP
- Website: fbtgibbons.com

FBT Gibbons is a U.S. law firm with over 800 attorneys and 26 offices nationwide. It was formed through the combination of Frost Brown Todd and Gibbons P.C. in January 2026. The firm, which operates as a limited liability partnership, is led by Chairman Robert Sartin and Co-Managing Partners Adam Hall and Peter Torcicollo.

== History ==
=== Predecessor firms ===
FBT Gibbons' legacy firm, Frost Brown Todd, was founded in 1919 in Cincinnati as Frost & Jacobs. In 1982, three Louisville firms merged to form Brown, Todd & Heyburn, which later combined with Frost & Jacobs to become Frost Brown Todd, at which time it had offices in Ohio, Kentucky, and Nashville, Tennessee. The firm expanded to West Virginia and Indiana through mergers occurring in 2007 and 2009. Over the following decade, Frost Brown Todd established offices in Pittsburgh, Dallas, and Houston. A Washington, D.C., office was opened in 2021. This was followed by its 2023 merger with California-based firm AlvaradoSmith, which added offices in San Francisco, Los Angeles, and Orange County, and the launch of a Denver office in 2024. Then, in October 2025, Frost Brown Todd announced that it would combine with New Jersey-based firm Gibbons P.C. to form FBT Gibbons.

FBT Gibbons’ other legacy firm, Gibbons P.C., had approximately 170 lawyers prior to its 2026 combination with Frost Brown Todd. Gibbons P.C. was founded in 1926 by Andrew Crummy, a World War I veteran who formed a law partnership with Adam Rossbach that was originally called Crummy & Rossbach. Crummy later partnered with William Considine and John Joseph Gibbons to form Crummy, Considine & Gibbons. Gibbons left the firm in 1970 when he was appointed to the U.S. Court of Appeals for the Third Circuit. In 1990, Gibbons returned to the firm, which was then known as Gibbons, Del Deo, Dolan, Griffinger & Vecchione, before the name was ultimately shortened to Gibbons P.C. in 2007.

=== Formation of FBT Gibbons ===
Frost Brown Todd and Gibbons P.C. announced their plans to merge in October 2025. The American Lawyer reported that Frost Brown Todd saw a 19% increase in revenue in 2025, along with a nearly 30% increase in profits per equity partner ahead of the merger. Bloomberg Law reported that both firms totaled more than $450 million in gross revenue the year before, a figure that would place their combined operations just outside of the country's 100 largest firms, according to data collected by The American Lawyer. The merger was approved by the partners and went into effect on January 1, 2026, at which point the firm began operating as FBT Gibbons. The combined firm has approximately 800 attorneys working across 26 locations nationwide.
