= Paula Boggs Muething =

Japanese-American lawyer

- Born: 1975
- Alma mater: University of Kentucky; University of Cincinnati College of Law
- Occupation: Lawyer, city manager (2020–2022)
- Employer: Cincinnati (2014–2022); FC Cincinnati (2022–)

Paula Boggs Muething (born circa 1975) is a Japanese-American lawyer. She became Cincinnati's first Asian-American city manager and the second woman to be appointed to the role in 2020.

== Personal life ==
Muething was born circa 1975 and grew up in Harlan, Kentucky. Her mother was a Japanese immigrant and her father worked in the military and was from Harlan, Kentucky. She is married to lawyer Brian Muething. She was diagnosed with breast cancer.

== Education ==
She earned a Bachelor of Art in Journalism and Political Science from the University of Kentucky.

In 2003, Muething graduated from the University of Cincinnati College of Law, where she studied in the Human Rights program. John Cranley - who would go on to become Cincinnati's Mayor - was one of her professors at the University of Cincinnati. While she was a law student she was a Human Rights Fellow and a member of the editorial board of the Law Review. She became a member of the Kentucky Bar Association on October 17, 2003. She had studied community land reform initiatives at the Harvard Kennedy School's Executive Education program.

== Career ==
She worked as an associate attorney at the Cincinnati-based corporate law firm Keating Muething & Klekamp.

In April 2014, Muething was appointed as General Counsel for the Port of Greater Cincinnati Development Authority. She was a member of the board of trustees for the Legal Aid Society of Greater Cincinnati in 2014.

From 2014 to 2020, Muething was Cincinnati's city solicitor. City Manager Harry Black hired her in 2014. In June 2020, Cincinnati Mayor John Cranley appointed her as the interim city manager after Patrick Duhaney resigned, making her the first Asian-American and second woman to be appointed to the role. On October 15, 2020, Cincinnati City Council officially made her the permanent city manager. In 2020, Muething and her husband chaired an event for University of Cincinnati College - Conservatory of Music's annual benefit event.

In December 2021, Muething resigned from her role as city manager and officially ended her term on January 19, 2022. The Cincinnati Enquirer reported that the resignation was "not a mutual parting" between Muething and the newly elected mayor Aftab Pureval. Pureval appointed John Curp as Muething's successor.

In 2022, Muething became the vice president of legal affairs for FC Cincinnati. She would later become FC Cincinnati's Chief Legal & Administrative Officer. That same year, she was appointed to the Dean's advisory board for the University of Cincinnati College of Law.

In 2023, she became the board president of the Ohio Access to Justice Foundation.
