= Kevin McNulty (judge) =

American judge (born 1954)

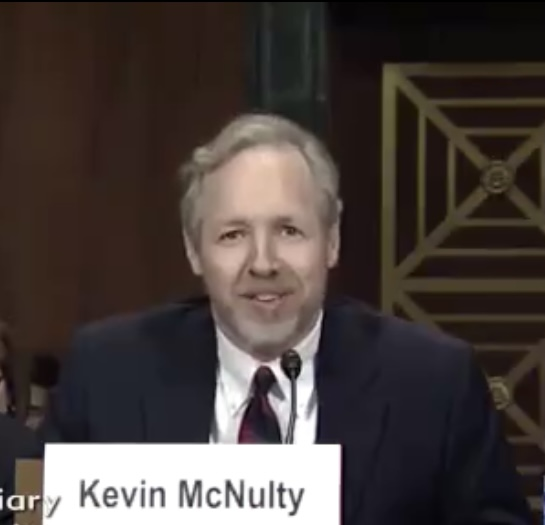

Senior Judge of the United States District Court for the District of New Jersey
- Incumbent
- Assumed office October 31, 2023

Judge of the United States District Court for the District of New Jersey
- In office July 18, 2012 – October 31, 2023
- Appointed by: Barack Obama
- Preceded by: Garrett Brown Jr.
- Succeeded by: Edward S. Kiel

Personal details
- Born: October 28, 1954 (age 71) Elizabeth, New Jersey, U.S.
- Education: Yale College (BA); New York University (JD)

Kevin Charles McNulty (born October 28, 1954) is a senior United States district judge of the United States District Court for the District of New Jersey.

== Early life and education ==
Born October 28, 1954, McNulty earned a Bachelor of Arts degree in 1976 from Yale University and a Juris Doctor in 1983 from New York University School of Law. After law school, McNulty served as a law clerk for Judge Frederick Bernard Lacey of the United States District Court for the District of New Jersey.

== Career ==
For three years at the start of his law career, McNulty served as an associate at a law firm. He then joined the United States Attorney's office in New Jersey, where he served as an Assistant United States Attorney for over a decade. While in the U.S. Attorney's office, McNulty served as deputy chief of the criminal division from 1992 until 1995, and chief of the appeals division from 1995 until 1998. In 1998, McNulty returned to private legal practice, serving as a partner in the Newark, New Jersey law firm Gibbons P.C.

=== Federal judicial service ===
On December 16, 2011, President Barack Obama nominated McNulty to a federal judgeship on the United States District Court for the District of New Jersey to fill the seat vacated by Judge Garrett Brown Jr., who assumed senior status on January 2, 2012. McNulty is the brother in-law of New York senator Chuck Schumer. Senator Frank Lautenberg submitted McNulty's name for consideration late in the process, and some anonymous commentators suggested that it was a political move to ensure Lautenberg had the future support of Schumer. He received a hearing before the Senate Judiciary Committee on March 14, 2012, and his nomination was reported to the floor on April 19, 2012, by voice vote, with Senator Lee recorded as voting no. On July 16, 2012, the Senate confirmed McNulty's nomination by a 91–3 vote. He received his commission on July 18, 2012. He assumed senior status on October 31, 2023.

Legal offices
Preceded by Garrett Brown Jr.	Judge of the United States District Court for the District of New Jersey; 2012–2023	Succeeded by Edward S. Kiel
