= BLM =

BLM may refer to:

== Political movements ==
- Black Lives Matter, an anti-racism movement
- Blue Lives Matter, an American pro-police countermovement

== Organizations ==
- Bureau of Land Management, an American federal government agency (formed 1946)
- BLM (law firm), U.K. and Ireland (1997–2022)
- Black Lives Matter Global Network Foundation, an American-based non-profit (formed 2013)

== Places ==
=== Territory ===
- Saint Barthélemy, Caribbean (ISO 3166-1 country code:BLM)

=== Buildings ===
- BLM Geothermal Plant, California, U.S.
- BLM Group Arena, Trento, Italy
- Braunschweigisches Landesmuseum, a museum in Brunswick, Germany

== Science and technology ==
- Biotic Ligand Model, a toxicology tool
- Black lipid membranes, in cell biology
- Bleomycin, a cancer medication
- Bloom syndrome protein, in genetics
- BLM protein, a helicase enzyme
- Basic Language Machine, a 1960s computer made by John Iliffe

== Transportation ==
- Belmont railway station (Sutton), London, England (by station code)
- Bergbahn Lauterbrunnen-Mürren, a rail line in Switzerland
- Blok M BCA MRT station, rapid transit station of the Jakarta MRT with station code BLM
- Blue Sky Airlines, a defunct Armenian airline (by ICAO code)
- Monmouth Executive Airport, New Jersey, US (by IATA code)
