= Pierre-Yves Trémois =

French visual artist and sculptor (1921–2020)

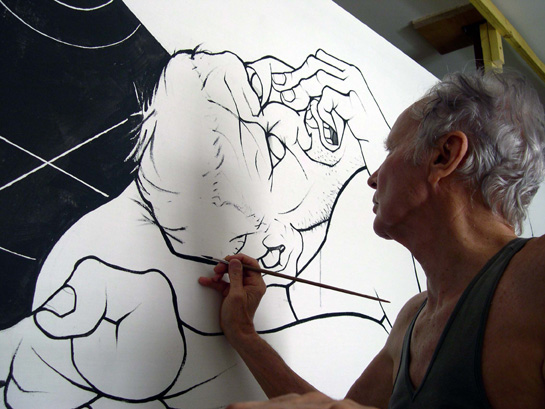
Pierre-Yves Trémois

Pierre-Yves Trémois (8 January 1921 – 16 August 2020) was a French visual artist and sculptor, known for evocative works drawing in equal proportions on surrealism and science illustration, and for combining graphic precision and rigor with flamboyant fantasy. He was born in Paris.

He held seat #2 in the engraving section at the Académie des Beaux-Arts.

== Decorations ==
- Commander of the Order of Arts and Letters (2015)
