= Untitled Anxious Red Drawings =

2020 series of artworks by Rashid Johnson

Untitled Anxious Red Drawings are a series of artworks created by the American artist Rashid Johnson and exhibited in an online show produced by the gallery which represents his work, Hauser & Wirth. A self-described continuation of his 2015 series "Anxious Men", first exhibited at the Drawing Center in New York City, these subsequent pieces have all been created during the stay-at-home orders of 2020. A portion of the proceeds from their sale went to the COVID-19 Solidarity Response Fund for the World Health Organization, with both Johnson and Hauser & Wirth each donating ten percent of the proceeds - according to the galleries website the series is sold out.

The works visually explore the artist's admitted anxiety; of which he relates... "Anxiety is part of my life. It's something that people of color don't really discuss as often as we should. It's part of my being and how I relate to the world, and being honest with that struggle has been rewarding for me. It has led to the kind of self-exploration that produces fertile ground for my output as an artist".
