= Black Lives Matter street mural (Springfield, Massachusetts) =

Mural in Springfield, Massachusetts, U.S.

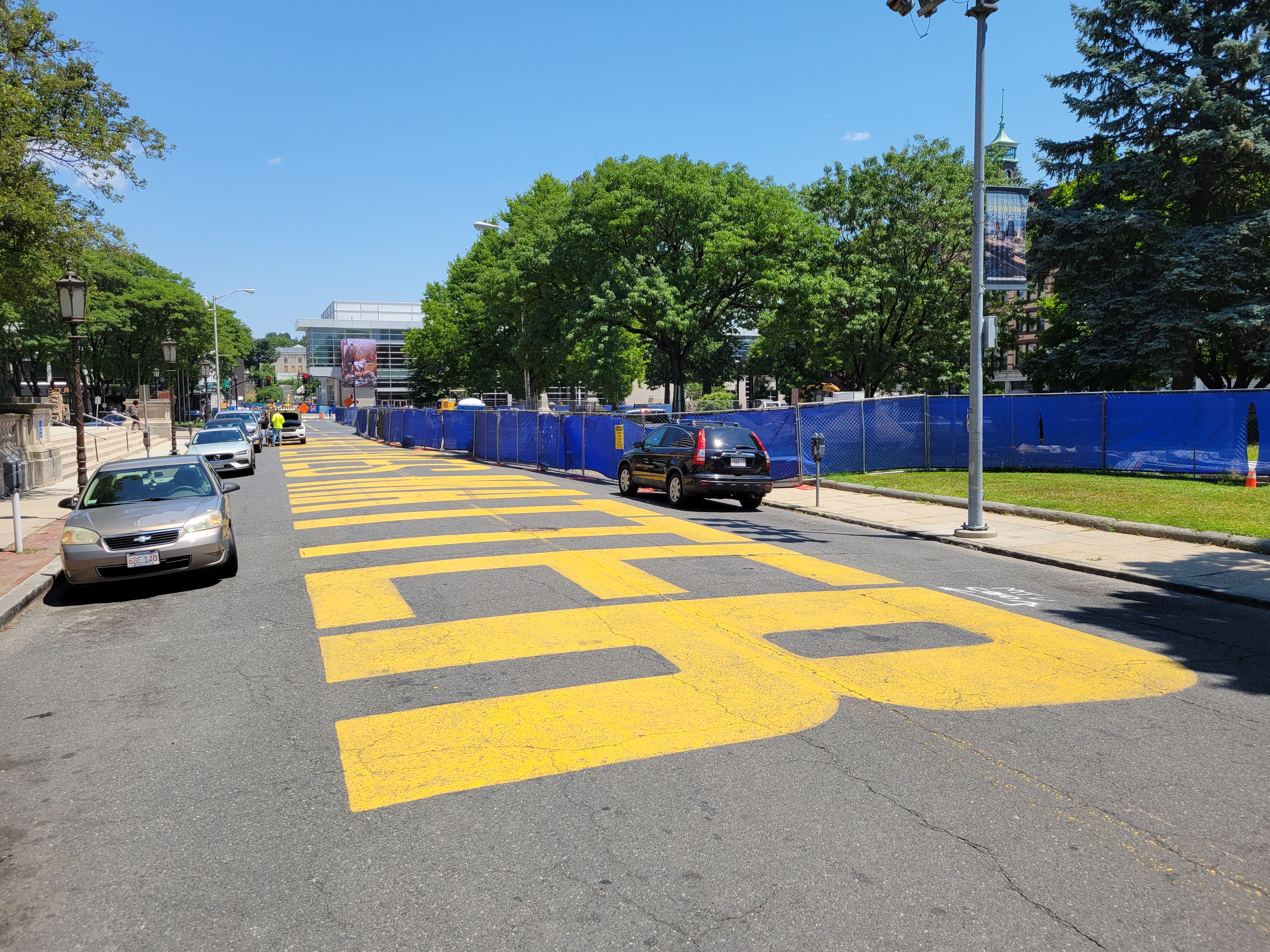
- Black Lives Matter street mural
- Year: 2020
- Location: Springfield, Massachusetts, U.S.; 42.1011°N 72.5895°W

In September 2020, a "Black Lives Matter" street mural was painted in Springfield, Massachusetts, United States. The mural has 20-foot-tall yellow letters covering both lanes of Court Street. It was vandalized three times within a month, prompting multiple searches for culprits and repairs to damage. The project was organized by City Councilor at Large Tracye Whitfield, who spearheaded the creation of another "Black Lives Matter" mural following the multiple incidents of vandalism.

== Description ==
The street mural had the text "Black Lives Matter" in yellow letters measuring 20 feet tall. The letters are equal in height but different in width. The "M" is 13 feet wide and the "I" is approximately 2 feet wide. The Republican described the mural as "classic typography on a huge scale". The mural covers both lanes of Court Street in front of City Hall and Symphony Hall.

== History ==
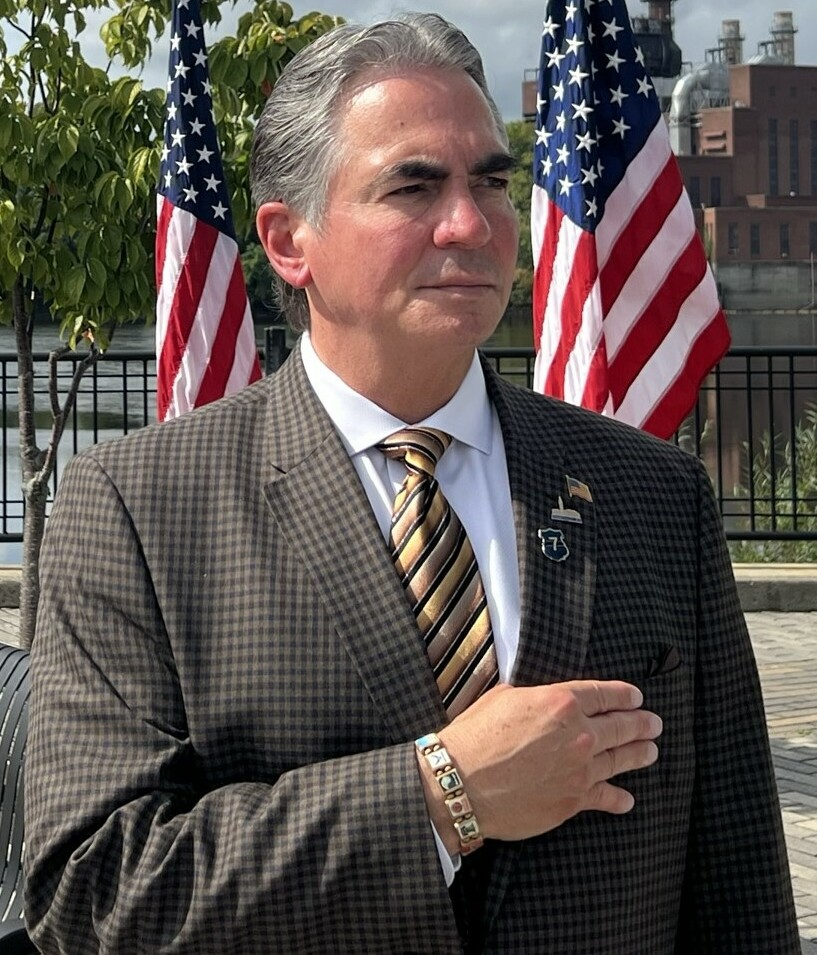
The mural was endorsed by mayor Domenic Sarno (pictured in 2023), who also vowed to find the culprits of multiple instances of vandalism.

The mural was painted in Court Square in September 2020. The project was organized by Tracye Whitfield, City Councilor at Large, and endorsed by mayor Domenic Sarno. Traffic was blocked between Main Street and East Columbus Avenue for a weekend while the mural was painted by an estimated 40 volunteers using 25 gallons of paint. Kim Carlino was the lead artist and Ramiro Davaro managed logistics. Carlino outlined the letters using a grid method. The project was supported by Common Wealth Murals via the Fresh Paint Springfield program. It was the second "Black Lives Matter" mural installed in the city. In mid 2020, one had been installed at the Martin Luther King Jr. Community Center on Rutland Street.

The Court Square mural was vandalized twice within the month, and again in October. The first incident involved tire burnout and occurred soon after the mural was completed. Sarno was "disheartened" by the vandalism. He asked authorities to find the culprit using surveillance footage and for city crews to repair the damage. After repairs, tire marks were left again days later. Sarno said the incident was caught on camera and once again vowed to identify the culprit and repair the damage. Whitfield and eight volunteers spent three hours repainting the mural.

The third incident involved a bicyclist using spray paint to deface the mural. The incident was also caught on camera and a case was assigned to a Springfield Police detective. Whitfield said the multiple incidents of vandalism inspired her and other volunteers who worked on the mural to paint another "Black Lives Matter" mural on the side of a building near Stearns Square in downtown Springfield "with a sense of purpose and enthusiasm".

In 2022, plans were made to install a rainbow-colored crosswalk ahead of the city's 2023 pride parade. The painting was slated to be installed on Main Street at its intersection with Court Square and Bruce Landon Way. The executive director of the Springfield Cultural Partnership said the location "is a natural in part because it would form a straight line connecting" the "Black Lives Matter" mural with the SPark! Public Art Display in the Pynchon Plaza at Landon Way and Chestnut Street. Finn acknowledged the possibility of vandalism given the incidents related to the "Black Lives Matter" mural.

== See also ==
- 2020 in art
- Black Lives Matter art
- List of Black Lives Matter street murals
- Murals of Springfield, Massachusetts
