= The Rebel Bear =

Glasgow street muralist

The Rebel Bear is a Glasgow street muralist of unknown identity, sometimes referred to as "The Scottish Banksy". The artist cloaks their identity while publicly creating work via the donning of a bear costume.

== Works ==
Fear and Love, of a male-female couple both dropping their protective masks a bit from covering their noses and mouths, to engage in a kiss.

Among their other works in Glasgow are graffiti placed in an underpass making light of the power of Mark Zuckerberg and Facebook, graffiti depicted Elon Musk holding on to the 'Twitter Bird' icon following its escape from a birdcage and free Palestine/ free Wi-Fi' graffiti located at the top on Gibson Street, near the Glasgow University Library.

During the COVID-19 pandemic related work was made, encouraging the wearing of protective masks (the celebrated aforementioned Fear and Love of a male-female couple both having lowered their protective masks to engage in a kiss) and thanking Frontline Healthcare workers (a nurse forming a heart with her hands on Ashton Lane in Glasgow).

== Controversies ==
In 2022, The Rebel Bear left graffiti on a wall in Leith area of Edinburgh showing four trams embossed with the Edinburgh Trams logo heading towards a lone man standing with a jacket and bag. Making comparisons with the Tiananmen Square protests of 1989, which the artist has modelled the art on, with some residents describing it as disrespectful.

In 2025, police were called to Cables Wynd House in the Leith area of Edinburgh, in order to bring a halt to the work on the artwork, after complaints from some residents of the building. The Rebel Bear had obtained planning permission from the City of Edinburgh Council for a temporary mural called ‘falling in love’ with the condition that permission was granted by the residents of the building. The Cables Wynd House Residents Group rejected the plans, citing the work's "distressing" nature, due to perceived associations with suicide and domestic violence. The Rebel Bear went ahead with the art work on 25 September 2025.
