= The Source of the Loue =

Paintings by Gustave Courbet

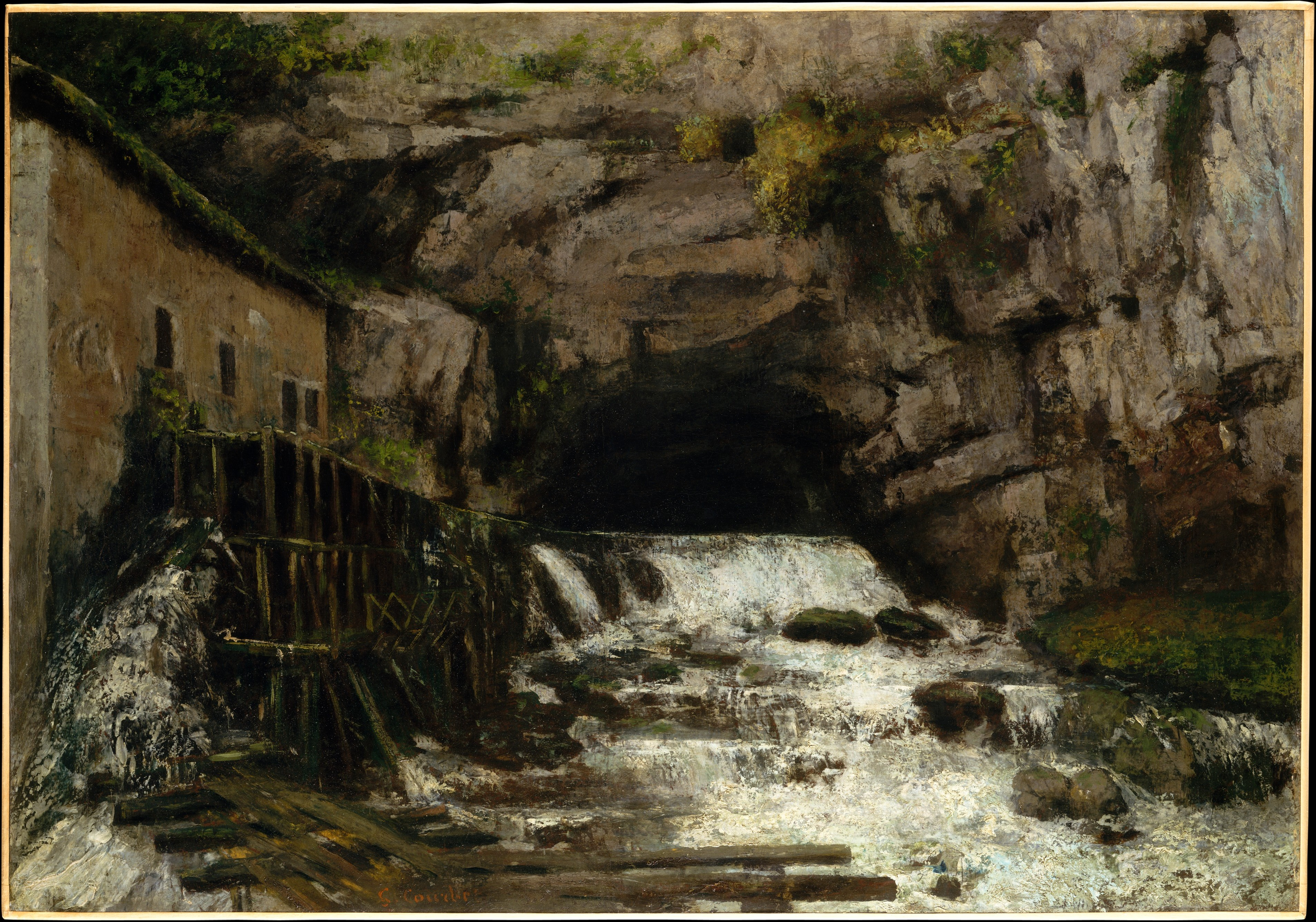
- One of Courbet's series (99.7 x 142.2 cm, oil on canvas) in the collection of the Metropolitan Museum of Art.
- Artist: Gustave Courbet
- Year: 1863–64
- Medium: Oil on canvas
- Location: Various

The Source of the Loue is the name of several mid-19th century paintings by French artist Gustave Courbet. Done in oil on canvas, the paintings depict the river Loue in eastern France.

== Description ==
An artist with naturalist and Realism proclivities, Gustave Courbet often painted the river Loue near Ornans, his hometown in eastern France. From 1863 to 1864, he painted a series of four paintings titled The Source of the Loue. The paintings depict rocky crags and grottos with the river flowing beneath them, a motif in keeping with Courbet's earlier works of Realism. All of the paintings showcase Courbet's skill in using a palette knife to apply pigment.

At the time of their creation, the paintings (along with other works by Courbet) were not widely accepted in the art community as they were considered works of Realism, then a fringe artistic movement.

=== Paintings ===
Courbet's series is now split between the collection of several institutions. One painting is in the collection of the Walters Museum, one is in the collection of the Kunsthaus Zürich, one is in the collection of the Kunsthalle Hamburg, and one is in the collection of the Metropolitan Museum of Art.
