= Rebeccah Blum =

American art historian and curator (1967–2020)

- Born: 1967; Berkeley, California
- Died: 2020

Rebeccah Blum (1967–2020) was an American art historian and curator. Blum was born in Berkeley, California, in 1967 to author Susan Bockius and professor Mark Blum. After studies in art history at American University in Washington, DC, she moved to Germany, where she worked as director at Berlin-based gallery Aurel Scheiblerin and European liaison of David Nolan Gallery in New York.

On July 22, 2020, Rebeccah Blum was killed in Berlin by her former partner, the British photographer Saul Fletcher, who subsequently committed suicide. Many galleries removed Fletcher's works from display in a move to erase all traces of his artwork.

== Sources ==
- Artforum Rebeccah Blum, Curator Who Expanded Berlin’s Art Community, Found Dead
- Hyperallergic Reflecting on the Life of Rebeccah Blum, Accomplished Curator, Editor, and Translator
- Monopol Magazine Femizid: Berliner Kunstwelt gedenkt ermordeter Kunsthistorikerin
- Art News 'I Want Her Name to Be Remembered': The Art World Reflects on the Life and Death of Curator Rebeccah Blum
- Art Agenda Remembering Rebeccah Blum – Features – art-agenda.
- Kunstwelt trauert um Rebeccah Blum
