= Winchester Square Historic District =

Historic district in Massachusetts, United States

- U.S. National Register of Historic Places
- U.S. Historic district
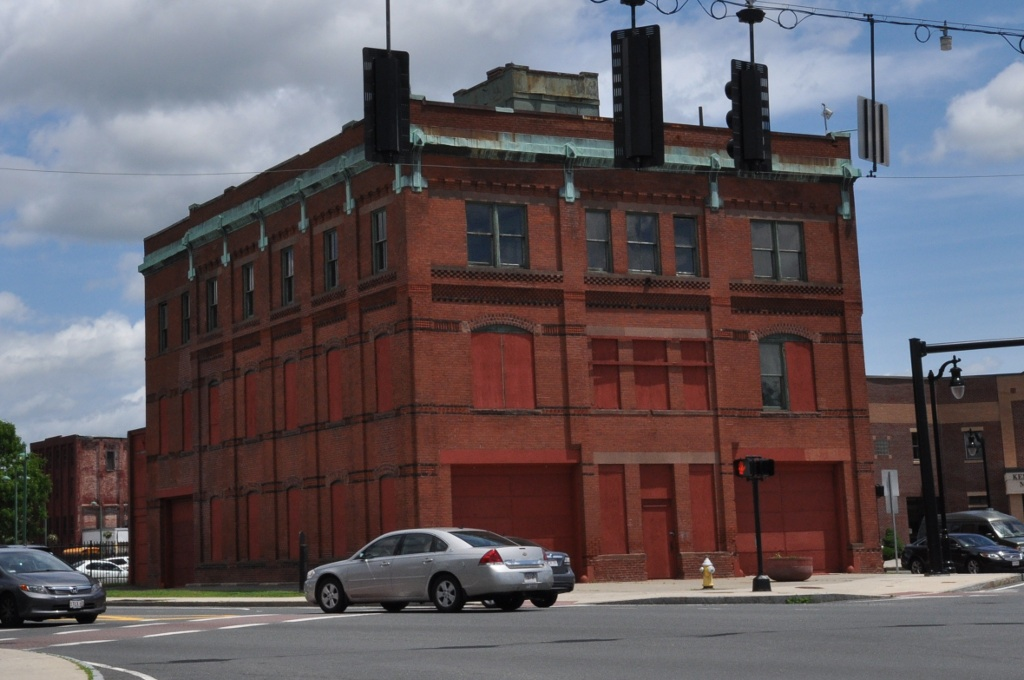
- The shuttered Winchester Square Fire Station

- Location within Massachusetts Location within the United States
- Location: State St. and Wilbraham Rd., Springfield, Massachusetts
- Coordinates: 42°6′38″N 72°33′45″W
- Area: 5.4 acres (2.2 ha)
- Built: 1875
- Architect: Francis Richard
- NRHP reference No.: 79000350
- Added to NRHP: May 10, 1979

Winchester Square Historic District is a historic district encompassing a cluster of brick buildings at and near the intersection of State Street and Wilbraham Road on the east side of Springfield, Massachusetts. The buildings, most of which were built for industrial purposes, are clustered on five parcels, and were built between 1875 and 1913. It includes the Armory railroad station (1875), the Winchester Square fire station (1886, remodeled 1915), the Knox Automobile Company buildings (1891-1910), and the Indian Motorcycle Company plant, part of which later became the Springfield Industrial Institute complex. The district was listed on the National Register of Historic Places in 1979.

The district became a target for industrial development after the construction of the Springfield and New London Railroad in 1870, which included a stop nearby. The oldest building in the district is that of the Bullard Repeating Arms Company, built in 1883 for a company that manufactured rifles. Its founder Jean Bullard, a prolific inventor, also built an early steam-powered automobile in 1887. One building was eventually taken over in 1895 by the Springfield Industrial Institute, which trained generations of workmen for Springfield's industries. The fire station was built to meet the demand for improved fire department response time in the developing area. The Hendee Manufacturing Company, later Indian, began operations in this district upon its organization in 1901; in 1914, it was the world's largest maker of motorcycles. It operated here until 1948, and closed its last plant in 1953.

== See also ==
- National Register of Historic Places listings in Springfield, Massachusetts
- National Register of Historic Places listings in Hampden County, Massachusetts
