= Pierre Nahon =

French art collector (1935–2020)

- Born: 30 December 1935; Oran, French Algeria
- Died: 10 September 2020 (aged 84); Vence, Alpes-Maritimes, France
- Occupations: Art collector and dealer

Pierre Nahon (30 December 1935 – 10 September 2020) was an Algerian-born French art collector and gallery owner.

== Biography ==
Nahon was born on 30 December 1935 in Oran. In 1936, his family moved to Paris. At the age of 16, he bought a watercolor painting by Francis Picabia. After returning from the Algerian War, he met aspiring actress Marianne Bayet. They married in December 1960. In 1973, they left their respective careers to open their own art gallery, Galerie Beaubourg in Paris, near the future Centre Pompidou. As a novice gallery owner, he worked with Patrice Trigano and managed to obtain works by César Baldacchini and Arman.

In 1996, Nahon and Bayet were the subjects of a documentary by Jean-Luc Léon titled Un marchand, des artistes et des collectionneurs, which discussed money in the world of art. Nahon felt betrayed and victimized by the documentary, which Léon claimed to be entirely unintentional.

Pierre Nahon died on 10 September 2020 at the age of 84.

== Exhibited artists ==
Nahon exhibited artists such as; Armand, César Baldacchini, Charles Matton, Jean Tinguely, Yves Klein, Niki de Saint Phalle, Daniel Spoerri, George Segal, Andy Warhol, Raymond Hains, Jacques Villeglé, Dado, Jean-Michel Basquiat, and Joseph Beuys.

In 2004, Nahon and Bayet sold their collection from the Château de Notre-Dame-des-Fleurs in Vence in a partnership with Sotheby's. On 19 March 2019, a new sale was made at the Galerie Charpentier.

== Books ==
- Venise, comme un miroir (2016)
- César, l'âge de bronze (2017)
- Dictionnaire amoureux illustré de l'art moderne et contemporain (2018)
- Persona Grata (2019)

=== Contributions ===
- 25 ans d’art vivant (1986)
