= Umberto Romano (artist) =

American painter (1906–1982)

- Born: 1906; Bracigliano, Campania, Italy
- Died: 1982 (aged 77); Mount Sinai Hospital, New York City, New York, United States
- Style: Abstract expressionism

Umberto Romano (1906–1982) was an Italian-born American painter who settled in Cape Ann. His early style has been described as classic modern, while his later works are characterized as abstract expressionist.

Works by Romano are held at the Corcoran Gallery of Art, the Fogg Art Museum in Boston, the Metropolitan Museum of Art, the Smithsonian Institution, and the Whitney Museum.

== Early life ==
Romano was born in Bracigliano, a comune near Salerno, Italy. He immigrated to the United States at age 9 with his parents, and was raised in Springfield, Massachusetts, where he attended Howard Street School and Central High School. He later enrolled at the National Academy of Design in New York City before going on to study at the American Academy in Rome.

== Career ==
Romano painted portraits of figures such as Albert Einstein, Foster Furcolo, Pope John XXIII (1967), John F. Kennedy, Martin Luther King, Jr., Abraham Lincoln (1957), and Sara Roosevelt, the mother of Franklin D. Roosevelt (1935).

Romano had his first solo exhibition in 1928, at the Rehs Galleries in New York City.

In 1937 the Federal Arts Project underwrote a project undertaken by Romano with the help of several students to install six mural panels in the Springfield Main Post Office.

During World War II, Romano's paintings became "darker and more melancholic".

Romano illustrated a 1947 English translation of Dante's Divine Comedy.

Romano later installed a mosaic of "Moses rendering judgment" at the New York Civil Court, which was dedicated in 1961.

== Teaching ==
In 1929, Romano taught students in Rocky Neck, Massachusetts.

From 1934 until 1940, Romano was the head of the Worcester Art Museum School. After this, he opened the Romano Summer School in East Gloucester, Massachusetts, of which he was head for the next 20 years.

From 1967 to 1974, Romano served as the vice president of the design academy at the American Academy in Rome, and as a member of the school's board.

Romano taught at the National Academy of Design for a decade, beginning in 1968.

== Personal life ==
In 1933, Romano settled in Gloucester, Massachusetts. In the mid-1960s, he moved to Provincetown.

Romano married Clorinda Corcia. The couple had a son, Umberto Jr. Throughout their marriage, the two lived in Gloucester, Provincetown, and Worcester.

In 1982, at the age of 77, Romano died of heart failure at Mount Sinai Hospital in New York City. At the time of his death, he split his time between living in Manhattan and living in Chatham, Massachusetts.
