= Black Lives Matter street mural (Santa Cruz, California) =

Mural in Santa Cruz, California, U.S.

- Year: 2020
- Location: Santa Cruz, California, U.S.; 36.9745°N 122.0290°W

A "Black Lives Matter" street mural was painted in Santa Cruz, California, United States.

== History ==
Community organizers Abi Mustapha, Sean McGowen, Taylor Reinhold and Shandara Gill spearheaded the mural project. The painting was done by 500 volunteers, and funding was acquired through fundraising, t-shirt sales, and donations. After two months, the project received unanimous approval from the Santa Cruz City Council, making Santa Cruz the first city in America to approve a Black Lives Matter Mural.

The mural was painted September 2020. A fresh coast of paint was applied in June 2021.

The mural was vandalized in July 2021. The vandalism consisted of heavy black tire tread marks resulting from burnouts.

On January 20, 2025, coinciding with Martin Luther King Jr. Day and the second inauguration of Donald Trump, local civil rights activist Thairie Ritchie self-immolated on top of the mural as an act of political protest. While he survived, his current condition is not public knowledge.

== See also ==
- 2020 in art
