= Corporated law firm =

Type of law firm in Korea

A corporated law firm (Korean: 법무법인; Hanja: 法務法人) is a type of law firm in South Korea. Most South Korean law firms are corporated law firms.
