= George Floyd protests =

2020–2023 police brutality protests

- Part of the United States racial unrest (2020–2023) and the Black Lives Matter movement
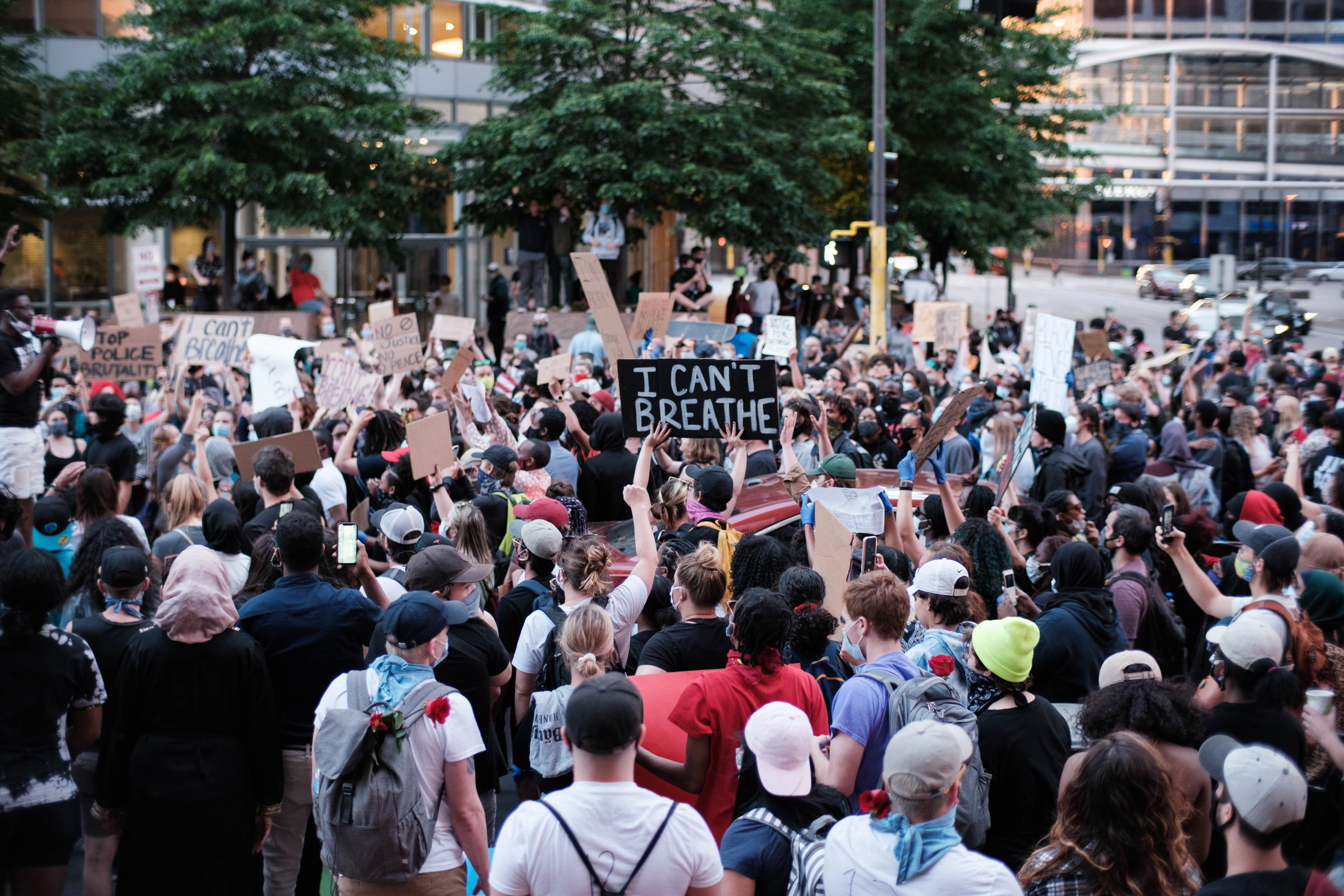
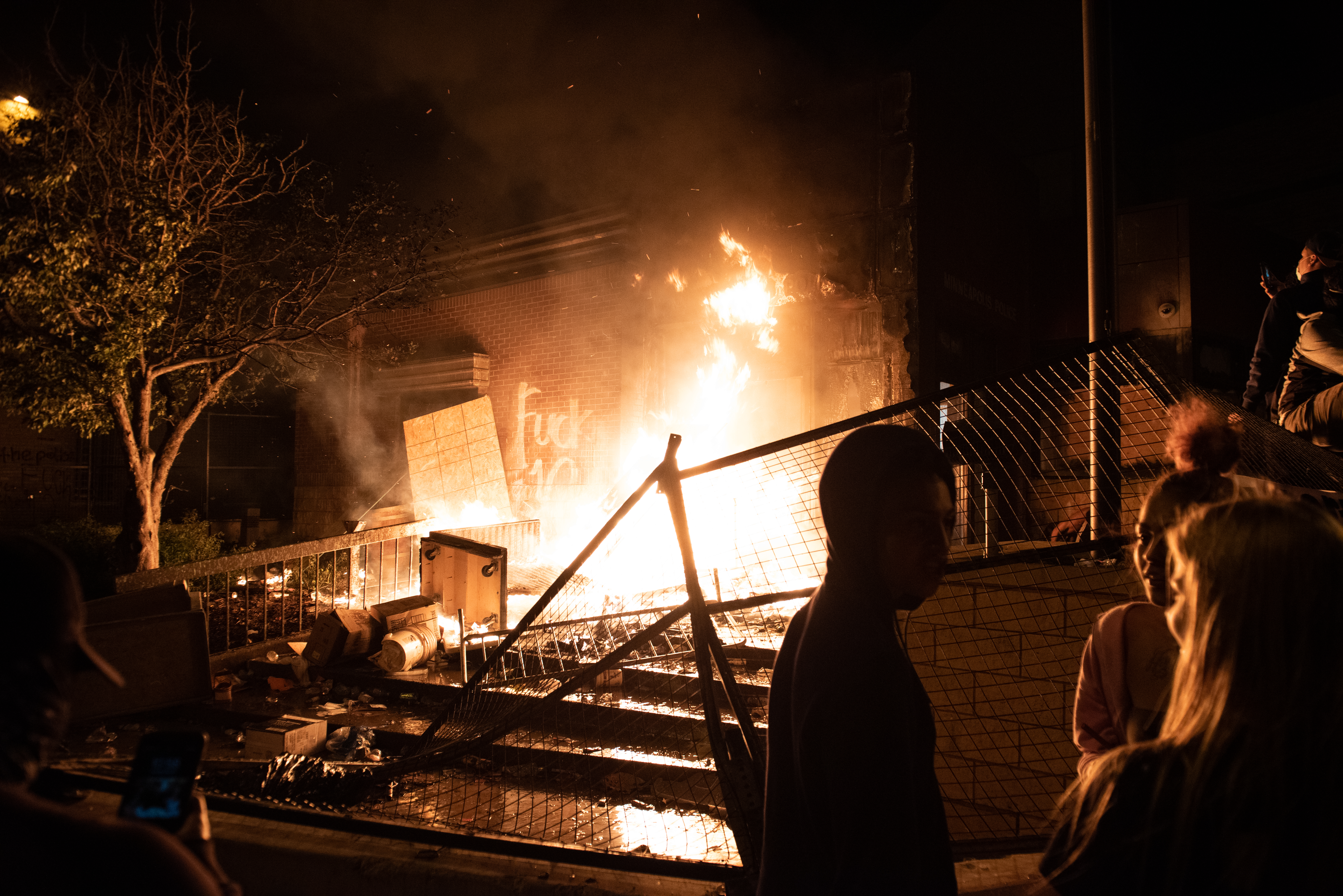
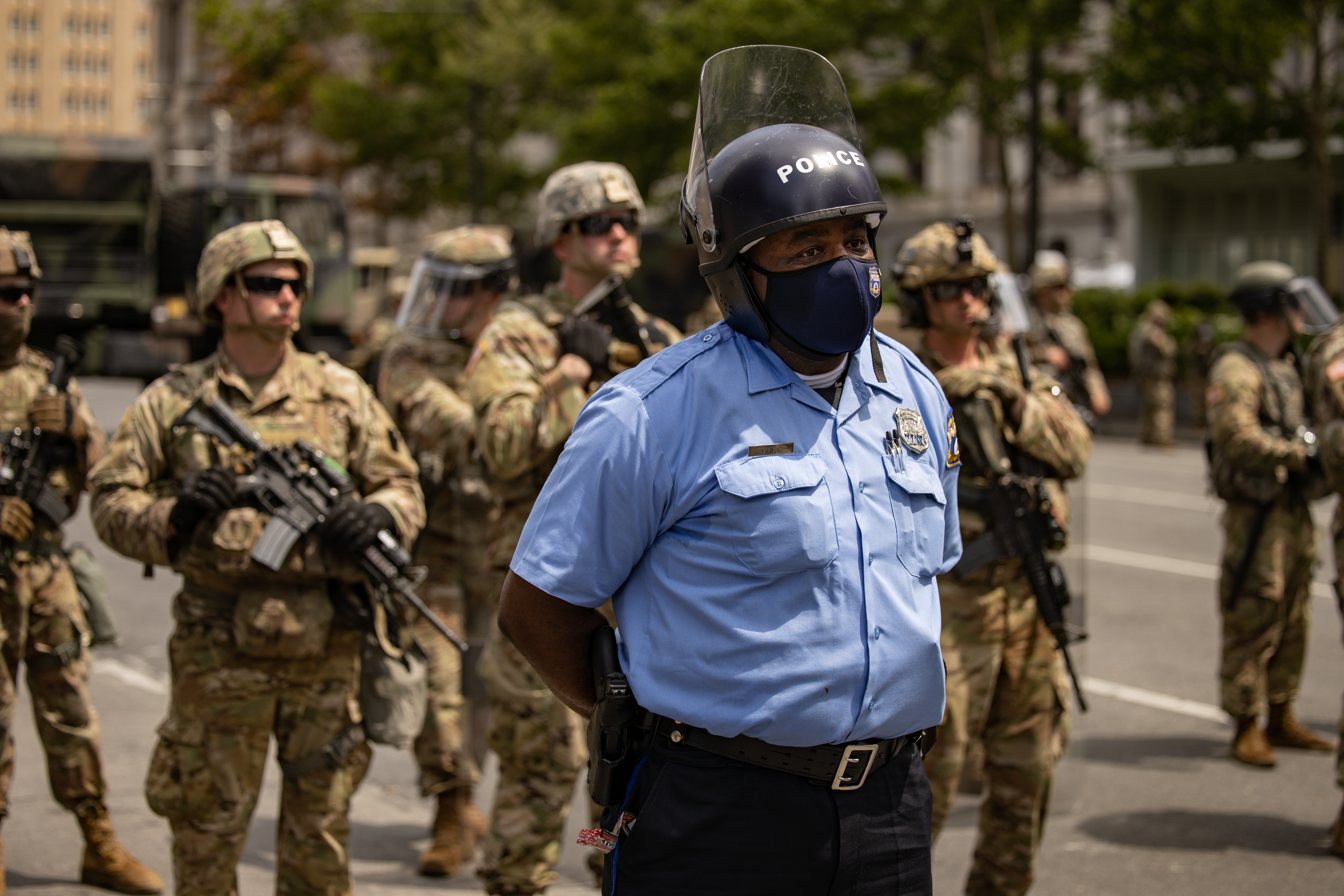
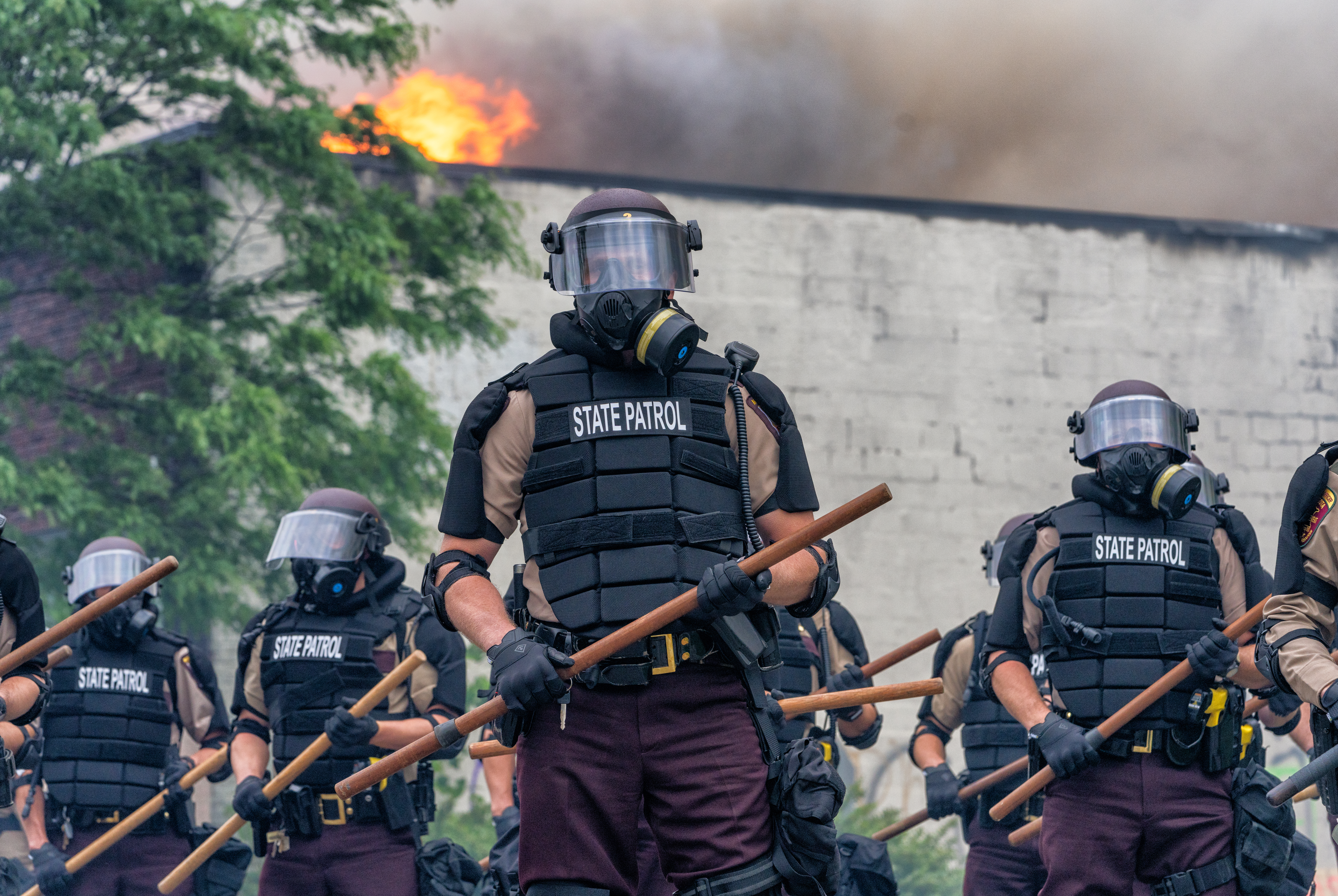
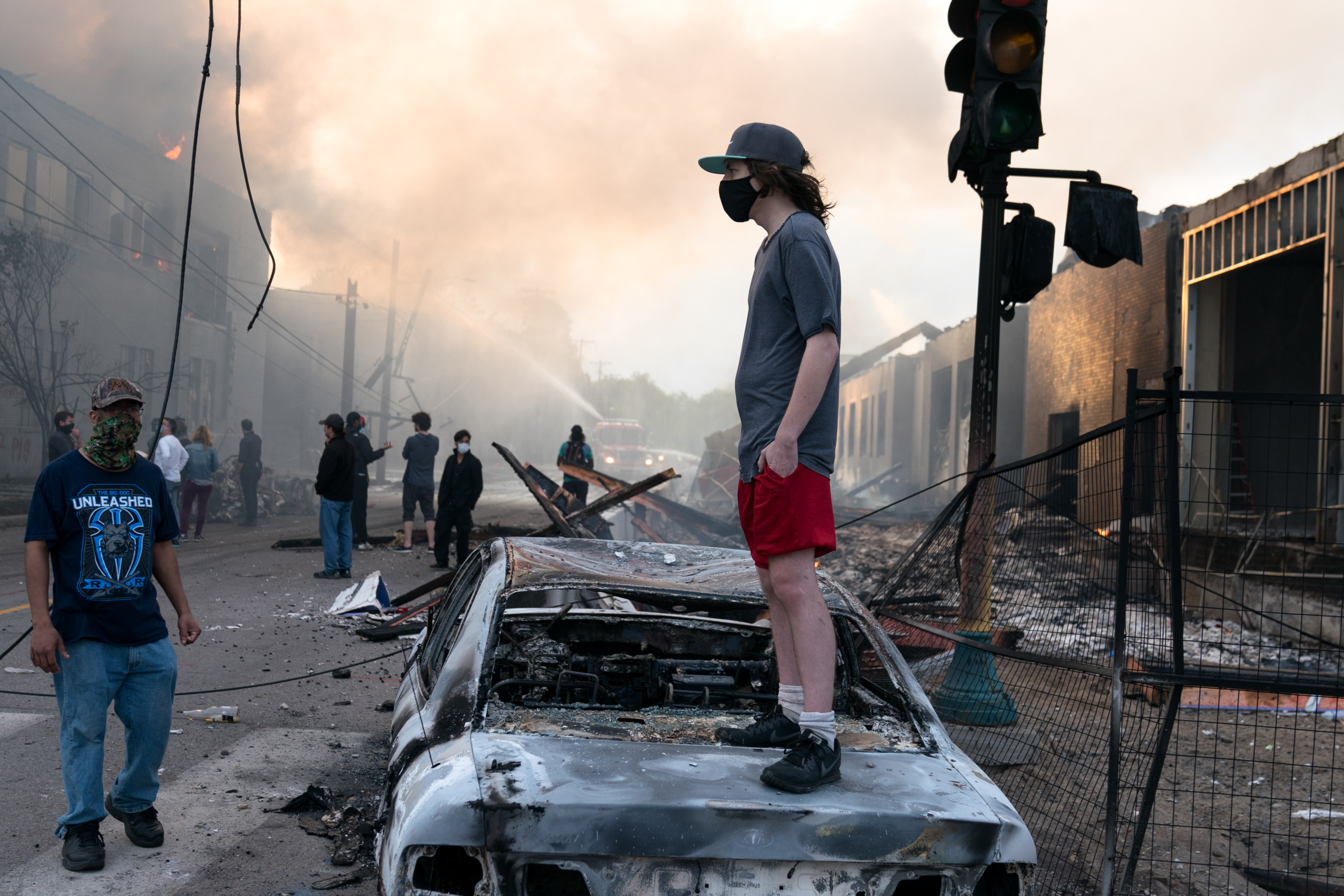
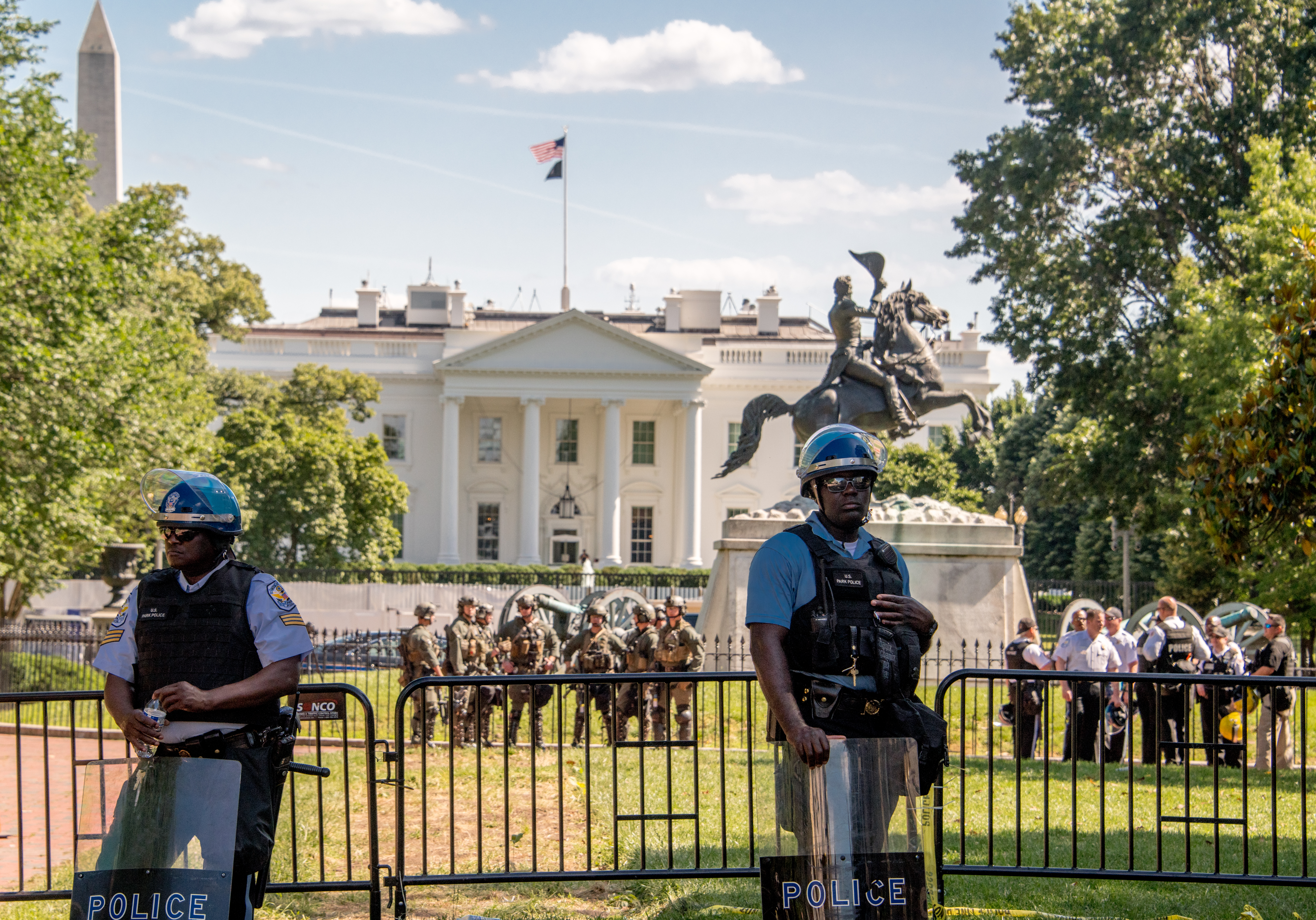
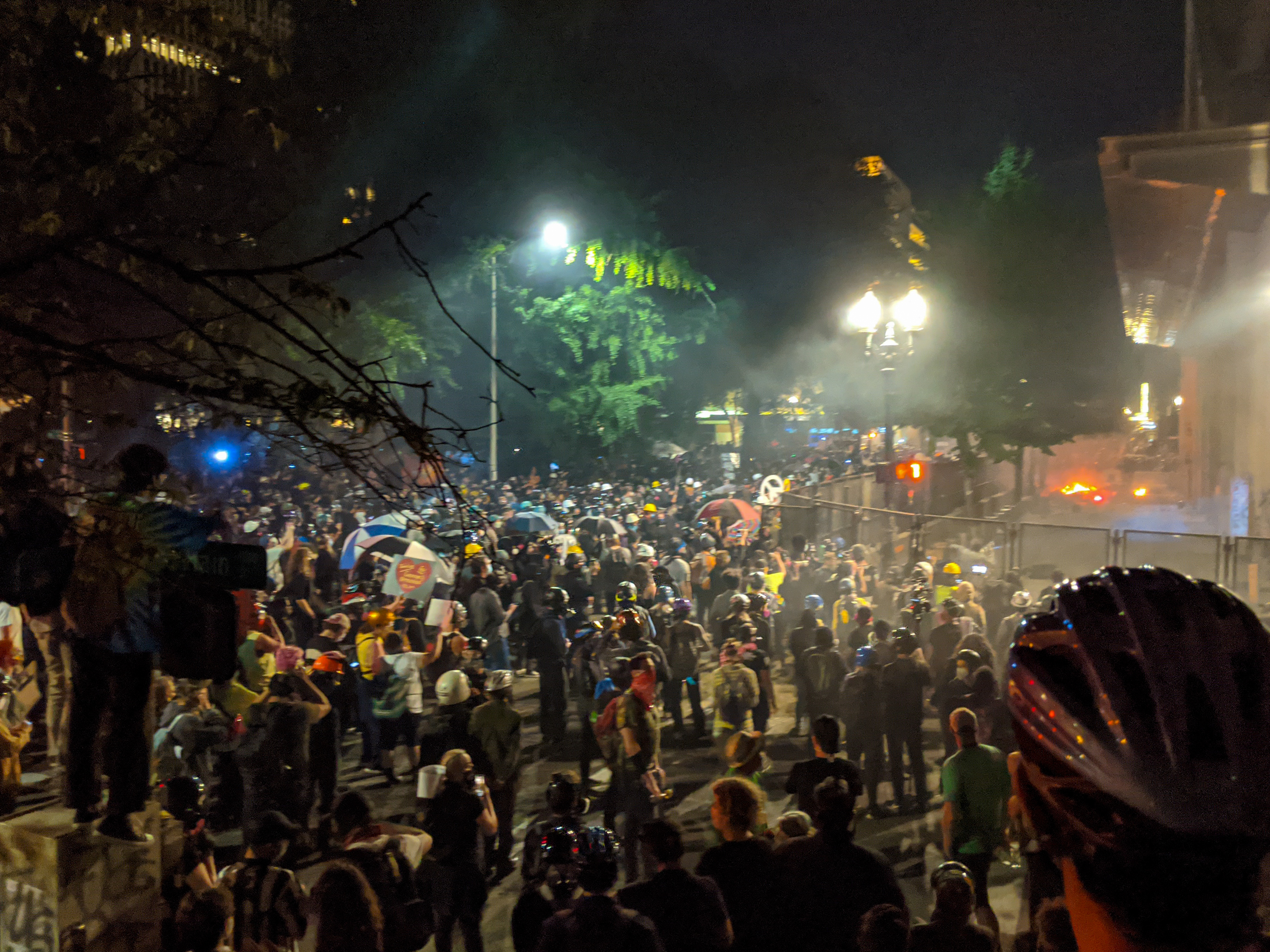
- Clockwise from top: Protesters in Minneapolis where George Floyd was murdered and the unrest began; Police and National Guard at a protest in Philadelphia, Pennsylvania; Bystanders and firefighters at a torched street in Minneapolis; Protest near the Multnomah County Justice Center in Portland, Oregon; Police and National Guard in front of the White House in Washington, D.C.; Minnesota State Patrol troopers in formation in front of a burning building in Minneapolis; The Minneapolis Police's 3rd Precinct set ablaze
- Date: In whole of the United States: May 26, 2020 – May 26, 2021 (1 year) In Minneapolis–Saint Paul: May 26, 2020 – May 2, 2023 (2 years, 11 months and 1 week) George Floyd Square: May 26, 2020 – May 2, 2023 (2 years, 11 months and 1 week)
- Location: United States; Global
- Caused by: Murder of George Floyd while being arrested by Minneapolis Police; Police brutality; Lack of police accountability; Inequality and racism
- Methods: Protests, demonstrations, civil disobedience, civil resistance, online activism, strike action, riots
- Result: Police reforms in some cities and states, but no successful federal legislation. Political debate over the defund the police and police abolition movements and police militarization.; Plans to disband the Minneapolis Police Department announced; provision for a city charter amendment passed by the Minneapolis City Council; Referendum on city charter amendment revision originally announced for November 2020, but would later be postponed; Federal forces began to be deployed in June 2020; Operation Legend began in July 2020; Wave of changes to practices perceived as racially insensitive, including names, monuments, songs, marketing, depictions in all media from television to museums to emblems, blackface, and casting white voice actors for black characters. Reduced media depictions of police, and the dissolution of a fraternity.; Continued nationwide protests over racial and economic inequality, centering on broad social issues including police brutality

Deaths, arrests and damage
- Deaths: 19 (May 26–June 8, 2020)
- Arrested: 14,000+
- Property damage: $550 million in Minneapolis–Saint Paul (May 26–June 6, 2020); $1–2 billion in insured damage in the United States (May 26–June 8, 2020)

Protests, riots, and demonstrations against police brutality began in Minneapolis in the United States on May 26, 2020 as reactions to the murder of George Floyd, a 46-year-old unarmed African American man, by city police during an arrest. They spread nationally and internationally. Veteran officer Derek Chauvin was recorded as kneeling on Floyd's neck for 9 minutes and 29 seconds; Floyd complained of not being able to breathe, but three other officers looked on and prevented passersby from intervening. Chauvin and the other three officers involved were fired and later arrested. In April 2021, Chauvin was found guilty of second-degree murder, third-degree murder, and second-degree manslaughter. In June 2021, Chauvin was sentenced to 22 1/2 years in prison.

The George Floyd protest movement began hours after his murder as bystander video and word of mouth began to spread. Protests first emerged at the East 38th and Chicago Avenue street intersection in Minneapolis, the location of Floyd's arrest and murder, and other sites in the Minneapolis–Saint Paul metropolitan area of Minnesota. Protests quickly spread nationwide and to over 2,000 cities and towns in over 60 countries in support of the Black Lives Matter (BLM) movement. Polls in the summer of 2020 estimated that between 15 million and 26 million people had participated at some point in the demonstrations in the United States, making the protests the largest in U.S. history.

While the majority of protests were peaceful, demonstrations in some cities escalated into burning of cars, looting, and street skirmishes with police and counter-protesters. Some police responded to protests with instances of violence, including against reporters. In the U.S., authorities responded more forcefully to BLM protesters and left-wing protesters than anti-mask protesters and right-wing protesters. When responding to BLM protesters, authorities responded with force 51% of the time compared to 33% for right-wing protesters. At least 200 cities in the U.S. had imposed curfews by early June 2020, while more than 30 states and Washington, D.C. activated over 96,000 National Guard, State Guard, 82nd Airborne, and 3rd Infantry Regiment service members. The deployment, when combined with preexisting deployments related to the COVID-19 pandemic and other natural disasters, constituted the largest military operation other than war in U.S. history.

By the end of June 2020, at least 14,000 people had been arrested. By June 2020, more than 19 people had died in relation to the unrest. A report from the Armed Conflict Location and Event Data Project estimated that between May 26 and August 22, 93% of individual protests were "peaceful and nondestructive" and research from the Nonviolent Action Lab and Crowd Counting Consortium estimated that by the end of June, 96.3% of 7,305 demonstrations involved no injuries and no property damage. However, arson, vandalism, and looting that occurred between May 26 and June 8 caused approximately $1–2 billion in insured damage nationally, the highest recorded damage from civil disorder in U.S. history, and surpassing the record set during the 1992 Los Angeles riots.

The protests precipitated a worldwide debate on policing and racial injustice that has led to numerous legislative proposals on federal, state, and municipal levels in the U.S. intended to combat police misconduct, systemic racism, qualified immunity and police brutality. The protests led to a wave of monument removals, name changes, and societal changes throughout the world and occurred during the early part of the COVID-19 pandemic and amid the 2020 U.S. presidential election season. Protests continued through 2020 and into 2021, most notably in Minneapolis at the 38th and Chicago Avenue street intersection where Floyd was murdered that activists have referred to as George Floyd Square. Several demonstrations coincided with the criminal trial of Chauvin in March and April 2021 and the one-year anniversary of Floyd's murder in May 2021. Officials in Minnesota and elsewhere proactively mobilized counter-protest measures for Chauvin's trial, but it did not result in unrest like what happened immediately after Floyd's murder.

Local officials in Minneapolis–Saint Paul prepared counter-protest measures in early 2022 for the start of the federal trial for the other three police officers at the scene of Floyd's murder. Relatively small protests took place during the trial and after the verdict announcement. On May 25, 2021, the one-year anniversary of Floyd's murder, a number of protests took place; most of these were short-lived, with calm being restored on the early hours of May 26, 2021. While the nationwide protests ended, the occupation of George Floyd Square in Minneapolis–Saint Paul persisted into 2024, however as of 2022 vehicular traffic was finally allowed to pass through it. On May 2, 2023, Tou Thao was found guilty of aiding and abetting manslaughter—the last federal or state court case related to Floyd's murder. The conviction fulfilled a key demand of protesters that all four police officers be held legally accountable for murdering George Floyd.

== Background ==
=== Police brutality protests in the United States ===
Cases of police misconduct and fatal use of force by law enforcement officers in the U.S., particularly against African Americans, have long led the civil rights movement and other activists to protest against a lack of police accountability in incidents they see as involving excessive force. Many protests during the civil rights movement were in response to the perception of police brutality, including the 1965 Watts riots which resulted in the deaths of 34 people, mostly African Americans. The largest post-civil rights movement protest in the 20th century was the 1992 Los Angeles riots, which were in response to the acquittal of police officers responsible for excessive force against Rodney King, an African American man.

The Black Lives Matter movement was originally started in 2013, after Trayvon Martin's killer was found not guilty in court. In 2014, the shooting of Michael Brown by police in Ferguson, Missouri, resulted in local protests and unrest while the killing of Eric Garner in New York City resulted in numerous national protests. In 2015, the death of Freddie Gray in Baltimore police custody resulted in riots in the city and nationwide protests as part of the Black Lives Matter movement. Several nationally publicized incidents occurred in Minnesota, including the 2015 shooting of Jamar Clark in Minneapolis; the 2016 shooting of Philando Castile in Falcon Heights; and the 2017 shooting of Justine Damond. In 2016, Tony Timpa was killed by Dallas police officers in the same way as George Floyd. In August 2019, Elijah McClain died after Aurora police ordered paramedics to administer ketamine under dubious circumstances. In March 2020, the fatal shooting of Breonna Taylor by police executing a search warrant at her Kentucky apartment was also widely publicized. After Eric Garner and George Floyd repeatedly said "I can't breathe" during their arrests, the phrase became a protest slogan against police brutality.

The murder of George Floyd sparked mass protests and calls for police reform in the face of ongoing police violence against African-Americans. Large companies such as Nike and Walmart aimed to express their support for the movement through branding themselves as antiracist. Despite some politicians expressing backlash for the Black Lives Matter protests, politicians such as Republican Senator Mitt Romney participated. The movement sought to express their understanding of police brutality as a result of anti-black sentiment, which is seen as structural in nature.

=== Murder of George Floyd ===
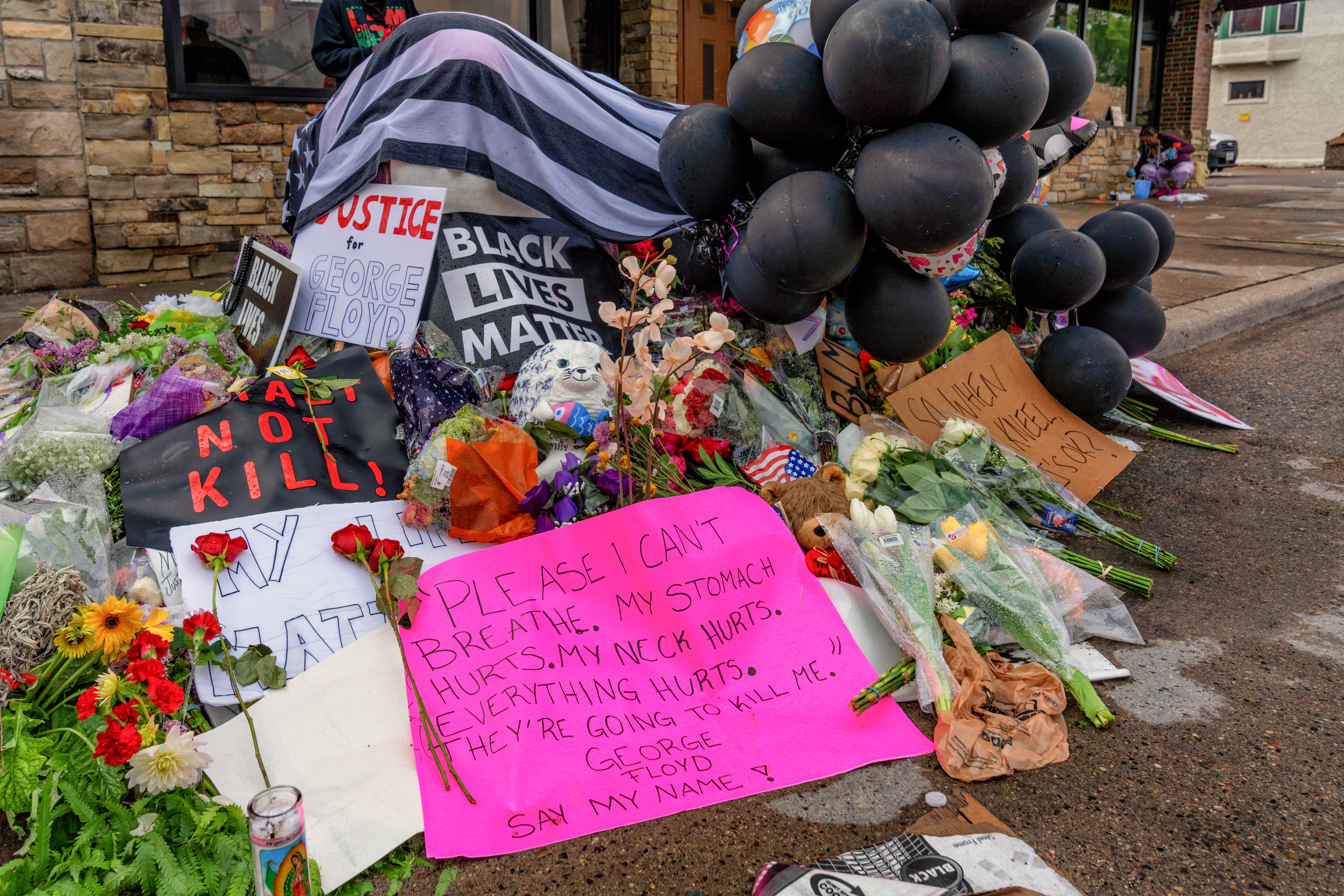
Memorial at the site of Floyd's murder

According to a police statement, on May 25, 2020, at 8:08 p.m. CDT, Minneapolis Police Department (MPD) officers responded to a 9-1-1 call regarding a "forgery in progress" on Chicago Avenue South in Powderhorn, Minneapolis. MPD Officers Thomas K. Lane and J. Alexander Kueng arrived with their body cameras turned on. A store employee told officers that the man was in a nearby car. Officers approached the car and ordered George Floyd, a 46-year-old African American man, who according to police "appeared to be under the influence", to exit the vehicle, at which point he "physically resisted". According to the MPD, officers "were able to get the suspect into handcuffs, and noted he appeared to be suffering medical distress. Officers called for an ambulance." Once Floyd was handcuffed, officers Kueng and Lane attempted to help Floyd to their squad car, but at 8:14 p.m., Floyd stiffened up and fell to the ground. MPD Officers Derek Chauvin and Tou Thao then arrived and made more failed attempts to get Floyd into the squad car.

Floyd, who was still handcuffed, went to the ground face down. Officer Kueng held Floyd's back and Lane held his legs. Chauvin placed his left knee in the area of Floyd's head and neck. A Facebook Live livestream recorded by a bystander showed Officer Derek Chauvin kneeling on Floyd's neck. Floyd repeatedly tells Chauvin "Please" and "I can't breathe", while a bystander is heard telling the police officer, "You got him down. Let him breathe." After some time, a bystander points out that Floyd was bleeding from his nose while another bystander tells the police that Floyd is "not even resisting arrest right now", to which the police tell the bystanders that Floyd was "talking, he's fine". A bystander replies saying Floyd "ain't fine". A bystander then protests that the police were preventing Floyd from breathing, urging them to "get him off the ground ... You could have put him in the car by now. He's not resisting arrest or nothing." Floyd then goes silent and motionless. Chauvin does not remove his knee until an ambulance arrives. Emergency medical services put Floyd on a stretcher. Not only had Chauvin knelt on Floyd's neck for about seven minutes (including four minutes after Floyd stopped moving) but another video showed an additional two officers had also knelt on Floyd while another officer watched.

The police report stated that medical services were requested prior to the time Floyd was placed in handcuffs, with Emergency Medical Services arriving at the scene with George Floyd already showing no signs of life. Medics were unable to detect a pulse, and Floyd was pronounced dead at the hospital. A May 26 autopsy conducted by the Hennepin County Medical Examiner's Office found that there were "no physical findings that support a diagnosis of traumatic asphyxia or strangulation"; the preliminary findings stated that underlying health conditions, the police restraint, and potential intoxicants likely contributed to Floyd's death.

On May 26, Chauvin and the other three officers were fired. Chauvin was charged with third-degree murder and second-degree manslaughter; the former charge was later changed to second-degree murder.

On June 1, a private autopsy commissioned by the family of Floyd found the death to be a homicide and that Floyd had died due to asphyxiation from sustained pressure, which conflicted with the original autopsy report done earlier that week. Shortly after, the official post-mortem declared Floyd's death a homicide. Video footage of Officer Derek Chauvin applying 8 minutes 15 seconds of sustained pressure to Floyd's neck generated global attention and raised questions about the use of force by law enforcement. On June 25, 2021, Chauvin was sentenced to 22 years and 6 months in prison with the possibility of supervised release after serving two-thirds of his sentence or 15 years for second-degree murder.

== Protests ==
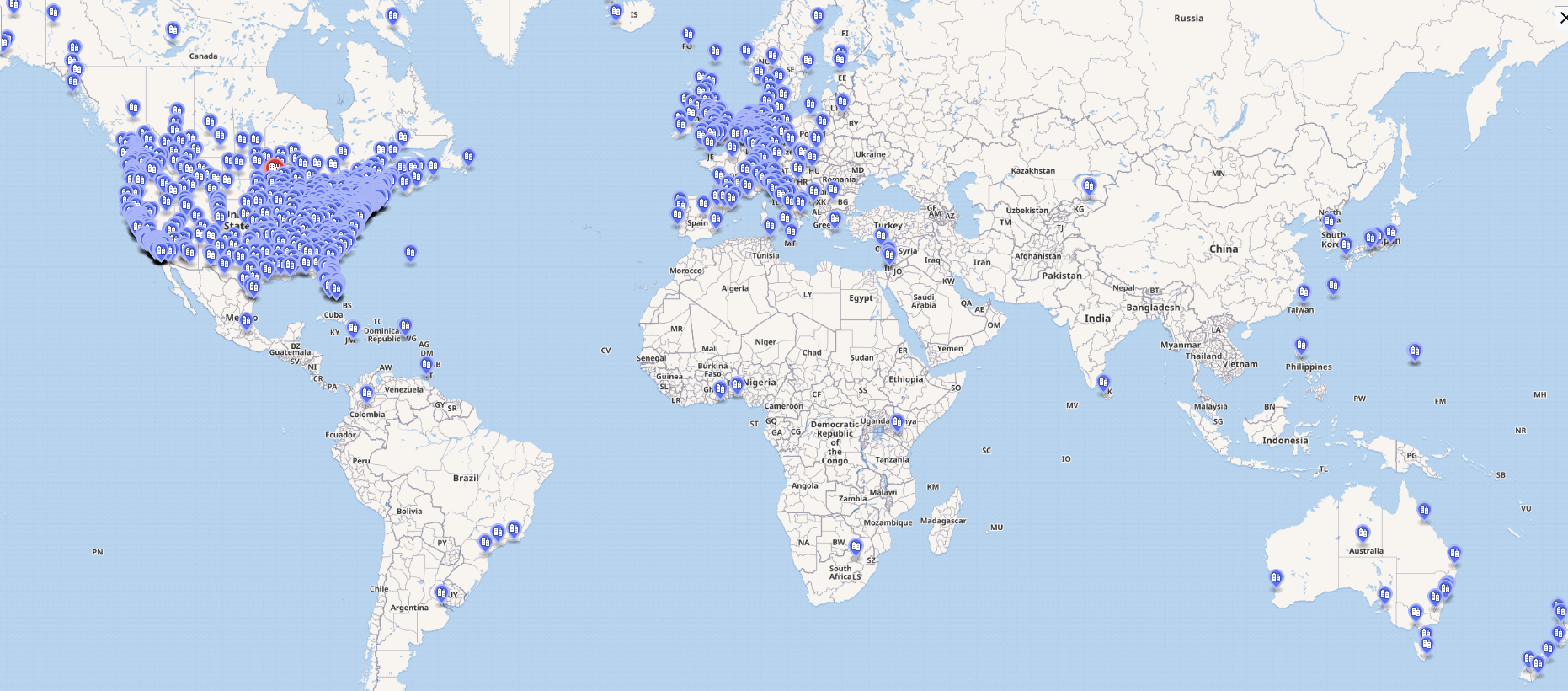
Map of protests around the world with over 100 participants. Minneapolis-St. Paul is marked in red. (click for a dynamic version of the map)

=== In Minneapolis–Saint Paul ===
Organized protests began in Minneapolis on May 26, the day after George Floyd's murder and when a video of the incident had circulated widely in the media. By midday, people had gathered by the thousands and set up a makeshift memorial. Organizers of the rally emphasized keeping the protest peaceful. Protesters and Floyd's family demanded that all four officers at the scene of his arrest and killing be charged with murder and that judicial consequences be swift. That evening, the protest rally turned into a march to the Minneapolis Police Department's third precinct station where the officers were believed to work. After the main protest group disbanded on the night of May 26, a much smaller group, numbering in the hundreds, spray-painted the building, threw rocks and bottles, broke a window at the station, and vandalized a squad car. A skirmish soon broke out between the vandals and protesters trying to stop them. At around 8 p.m., police fired tear gas and rubber bullets at demonstrators, some of whom had thrown water bottles at police officers.

Protests were held at several locations throughout the Minneapolis–Saint Paul metropolitan area in subsequent days. The situation escalated the nights of May 27 to 29 where widespread arson, rioting, and looting took place, which were noted as a contrast to daytime protests that were characterized as mostly peaceful events. Some initial acts of property destruction on May 27 by a 32-year-old man with ties to white supremacist organizations, who local police investigators said was deliberately inciting racial tension, led to a chain reaction of fires and looting. The unrest, including people overtaking the Minneapolis third precinct police station and setting it on fire the night of May 28, garnered significant national and international media attention. After state officials mobilized Minnesota National Guard troops in its largest deployment since World War II, the violent unrest subsided and mostly peaceful protests resumed. However, the violence by early June 2020 had resulted in two deaths, 604 arrests, an estimated $550 million in property damage to 1,500 locations, making the Minneapolis–Saint Paul events alone the second-most destructive period of local unrest in United States history, after the 1992 Los Angeles riots. About 60% of the local financial losses were uninsured.

In Minneapolis, protesters barricaded the street intersection at East 38th Street and Chicago Avenue where Floyd was murdered and transformed it into a makeshift memorial site, which was adorned with public art installments and described as like a "shrine". Thousands of visitors protested and grieved at the site. When Minneapolis city officials attempted to negotiate the re-opening of the intersection in August 2020, protesters demanded that before removing cement barricades the city meet a list of 24 demands, which included holding the trial for the four officers present during Floyd's murder.

On September 11, 2020, hundreds rallied outside a downtown Minneapolis court building where a pretrial hearing was held for the four police officers involved in Floyd's murder. On October 7, 2020, several protests were held in Minneapolis to express anger over Chauvin's release from jail pending trial after he posted bond for his $1 million bail. Minnesota Governor Tim Walz deployed 100 National Guards troops, 100 Minnesota state police troops, and 75 conservation officers. Fifty-one arrests were reported that night, mostly for misdemeanor offenses, such as unlawful assembly.

In early 2021, Minneapolis and Hennepin County officials spent $1 million on fencing and other barricades for police stations and other government buildings to prepare for potential civil unrest during the trial of Derek Chauvin in March. State and local officials also made plans to deploy thousands of police officers and National Guard soldiers. In early March, in the days preceding Chauvin's trial, local organizers staged peaceful protests with thousands of people marching in the streets. The situation at George Floyd Square in Minneapolis grew tense when a person was fatally shot inside the protester-held "autonomous zone" during an altercation on March 6, 2021. In March and April 2021, groups of protesters gathered at George Floyd Square and outside Hennepin County Government Center in Minneapolis during Chauvin's trial, but the streets of Minneapolis were largely empty of mass demonstrations like those in late May and early June 2020.

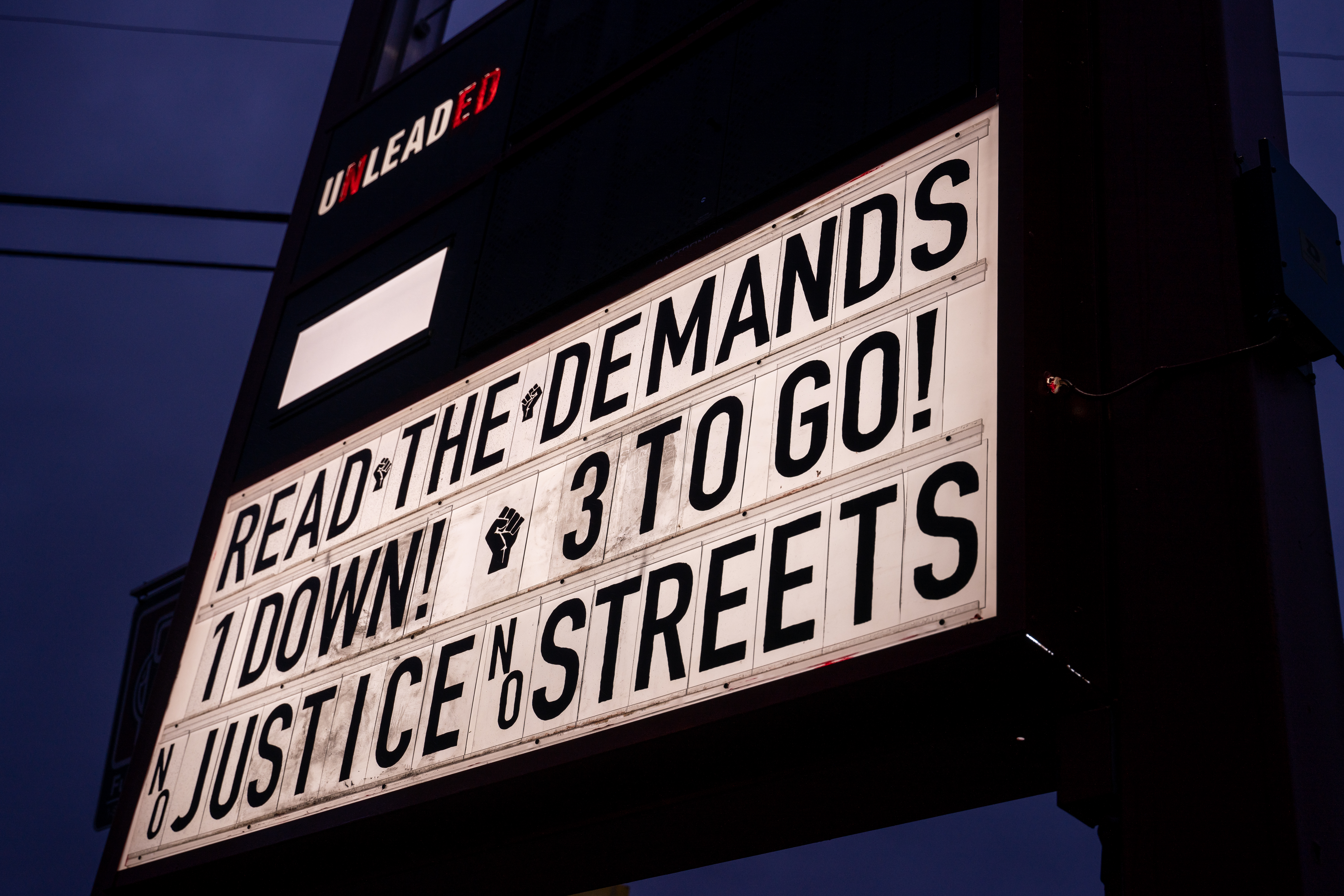
A sign at the George Floyd Square occupied protest, May 18, 2021

In April 2021, 3,000 National Guard troops and law enforcement officers were called from neighboring states in preparation for potential unrest over the outcome of the Derek Chauvin trial. On April 20, 2021, Derek Chauvin was found guilty of murdering George Floyd. By then, Floyd's murder had resulted in one of the largest civil rights protest movements in recent decades, and the Minneapolis–Saint Paul region had experienced a prolonged series of protests and intermittent unrest over issues of police brutality and racial injustice. As news of the Chauvin's guilty verdict spread on April 20, 2021, a crowd of one-thousand people marched in downtown Minneapolis and others gathered at 38th and Chicago Avenue to celebrate the outcome. Demonstrations in Minneapolis during Chauvin's criminal trial and verdict announcement were largely peaceful.

Following Chauvin's verdict, many activists in Minneapolis did not perceive that "Justice for Floyd" was final as J. Alexander Kueng, Thomas Lane and Tou Thao still awaited trial, and issues of systemic racism and police reform had not been addressed satisfactorily. George Floyd Square occupation protest organizers, who had transformed the street intersection where Floyd was murdered into an "autonomous zone" adorned with public art, said they would continue to protest. Activists changed a marquee that had counted down the days to Chauvin's trial to read, "Justice served?", and chanted, "One down! Three to go!", in reference to the looming trials of the other three officers who participated in Floyd's arrest and subsequent murder. The street intersection area had been a "continuous site of protest" since the day Floyd was murdered, and at nearly a year after his murder, thousands of people from multiple countries had visited the active, ongoing protest and memorial site there.

People gathered at multiple locations in Minneapolis for the announcement of Chauvin's sentencing on June 25, 2021, when he received a 22.5-year prison term. Family and civil rights activists expressed disappointment and said it should have been for the 30-year maximum, and they advocated for passage of the federal George Floyd Justice in Policing Act legislation. Several demonstrations were held in Minneapolis the evening of June 25. Civil rights activists and protesters noted the forthcoming civil rights case against the four police officers at the scene of Floyd's murder, and the criminal case against former officers Kueng, Lane, and Thao scheduled for March 2022.

Though the City of Minneapolis began the process of reopening the street intersection at George Floyd Square to vehicular traffic in June 2021, organizers of the protest movement rooted there still considered their presence an "occupation" and "resistance". The square hosted a celebration of life for Floyd on October 14, 2021. By December 23, 2021, the occupied protest had persisted at George Floyd Square for 19 consecutive months. Activists in Minneapolis had vowed to continue protesting until the outcome of the criminal case of all involved officers at the scene of Floyd's murder. The criminal trial was scheduled to begin on June 13, 2022.

In early 2022, local officials prepared counter-protest measures and for potential unrest ahead of the January 20 schedule start of the federal civil rights trial of Kueng, Lane, and Thao. Officials erected security fencing around the Warren E. Burger Federal Building in Saint Paul, Minnesota, that contained the courtroom for the trial. Protest demonstrations were held in the streets surrounding the courtroom building during the trial. On February 24, 2022, Kueng, Lane, and Thao were convicted on all federal civil rights charges they faced at trial. A small group of protesters gathered outside the court building in Saint Paul and at the location in Minneapolis where Floyd was murdered while the verdict was read.

George Floyd Square in Minneapolis continued to be a place of protest for over two years after Floyd's murder, with the movement there persisting into 2023. On May 2, 2023, Tou Thao was found guilty of aiding and abetting manslaughter, which marked the conclusion of all state and federal court cases for the four Minneapolis police officers. Thao's conviction signaled that a key demand of the George Floyd Square's Justice Resolution 001 had been met, that all four police officers be held legally accountable for murdering George Floyd. By the fourth anniversary of Floyd's murder in 2024, the streetway remained a continued place of protest.

=== Elsewhere in the United States ===
==== 2020 ====
George Floyd protest arrests reported to the DOJ or FBI as of June 6, 2020

Protests outside the Minneapolis area were first reported on May 27 in Memphis and Los Angeles. By May 28, protests had sprung up in several major U.S. cities with demonstrations increasing each day. By June, protests had been held in all U.S. states. At least 200 cities had imposed curfews, and at least 27 states and Washington, D.C., activated over 62,000 National Guard personnel in response to the unrest.

In Seattle, starting in early June, protesters occupied an area of several city blocks after the police vacated it, declaring it the Capitol Hill Autonomous Zone, where according to protesters "the police are forbidden, food is free and documentaries are screened at night". On June 11, President Trump challenged mayor Jenny Durkan and governor Jay Inslee to "take back your city", and implying, according to Durkan, the possibility of a military response.

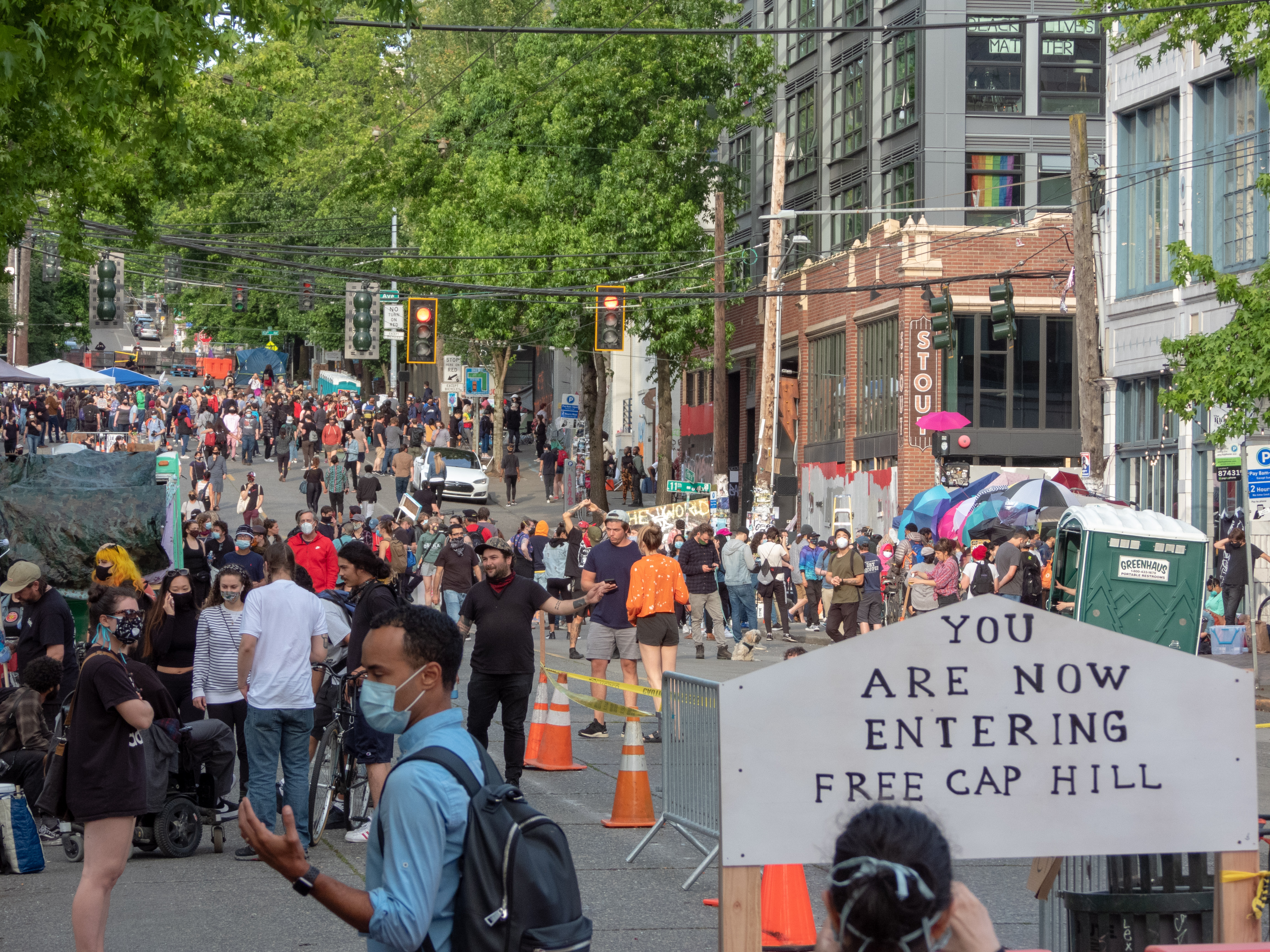
On June 8, 2020, the police-free Capitol Hill Autonomous Zone was established in the Capitol Hill neighborhood of Seattle.

On June 10, thousands of academics, universities, scientific institutions, professional bodies and publishing houses around the world shut down to give researchers time to reflect and act upon anti-Black racism in academia. Organizations involved with #ShutDownSTEM day included Nature Research, Massachusetts Institute of Technology and the American Physical Society.

On June 14, an estimated 15,000 people gathered outside the Brooklyn Museum at Grand Army Plaza for the Liberation March, a silent protest in response to police brutality and violence against black transgender women. Frustrated by the lack of media coverage over the deaths of Nina Pop, who was stabbed in Sikeston, Missouri, on May 3 and Tony McDade, who was shot by police in Tallahassee, Florida, on May 27, artist and drag performer West Dakota and her mentor, drag queen Merrie Cherry, decided to organize a silent rally inspired by the 1917 NAACP Silent Parade. The march generated widespread media attention as one of the largest peaceful protests in modern New York City history.

On June 19, Juneteenth, the International Longshore and Warehouse Union (ILWU) shut down ports on the West Coast in solidarity with protesters. An educator from the University of Washington said that the union has a history of protest and leftist politics since its founding: "[The ILWU] understood that division along the lines of race only benefited employers, because it weakened the efforts of workers to act together and to organize together. The UAW also asked members to join the protests by standing down for 8 minutes and 46 seconds, the amount of time Chauvin was initially reported to have held his knee to Floyd's neck.

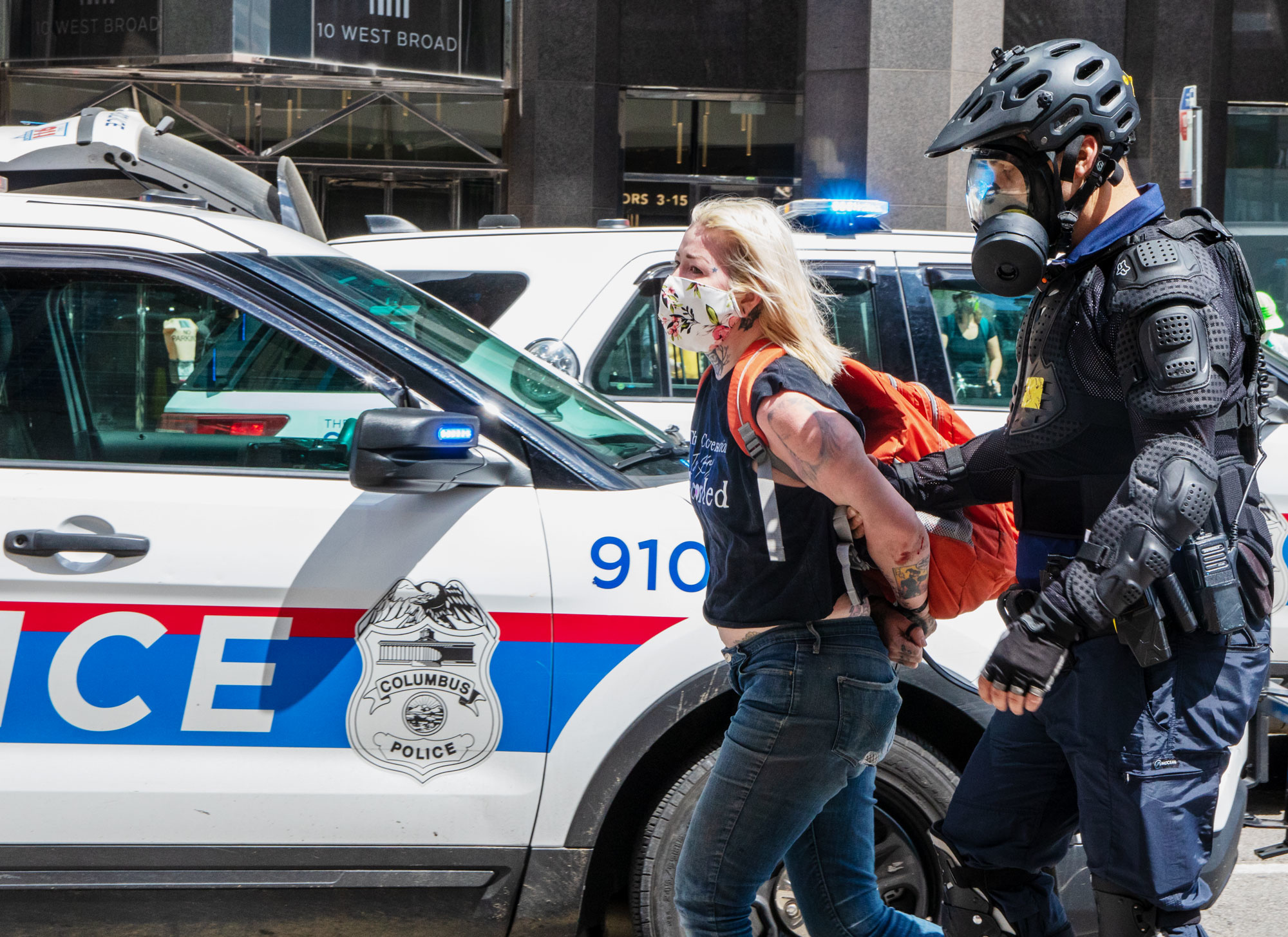
A protester being arrested in Columbus, Ohio, on May 30, 2020

On June 17, in response to the protests, three different police reform plans, plans from the Republicans, the Democrats, and the White House, were unveiled aiming to curb police brutality and the use of violence by law enforcement. On June 25, NPR reported that the hopes for passage were doubtful because they were "short-circuited by a lack of bipartisan consensus on an ultimate plan [and] the issue is likely stalled, potentially until after the fall election".

Protests continued over the weekend of June 19 in many cities, and observations of Juneteenth gained a new awareness. Jon Batiste, bandleader for The Late Show with Stephen Colbert, took part in a Juneteenth day of protests, marches, rallies and vigils to "celebrate, show solidarity, and fight for equal rights and treatment of Black people" in Brooklyn. Batiste also appeared in concert with Matt Whitaker in a performance presented in partnership with Sing For Hope, performed on the steps of the Brooklyn Public Library.

By the end of June, more than 4,700 demonstrations had occurred in the United States—a daily average of 140—with an estimate of 15 million and 26 million total participants. Protests had occurred in over 40% of the counties in the United States. Protests in the aftermath of Floyd's murder were then considered the largest in United States history.

As of July 3, protests were ongoing. On July 4, the Independence Day holiday in the United States, several protests were held, including in several cities where protests had been going on since the day after Floyd's murder. On July 20, the Strike for Black Lives, a mass walkout intended to raise awareness of systemic racism, featured thousands of workers across the United States walking off their jobs for approximately 8 minutes, in honor of Floyd.

The theme for the March on Washington held in Washington, D.C., on August 28, 2020, was, "Commitment March: Get Your Knee Off Our Necks", a reference to Floyd's arrest by Chauvin.

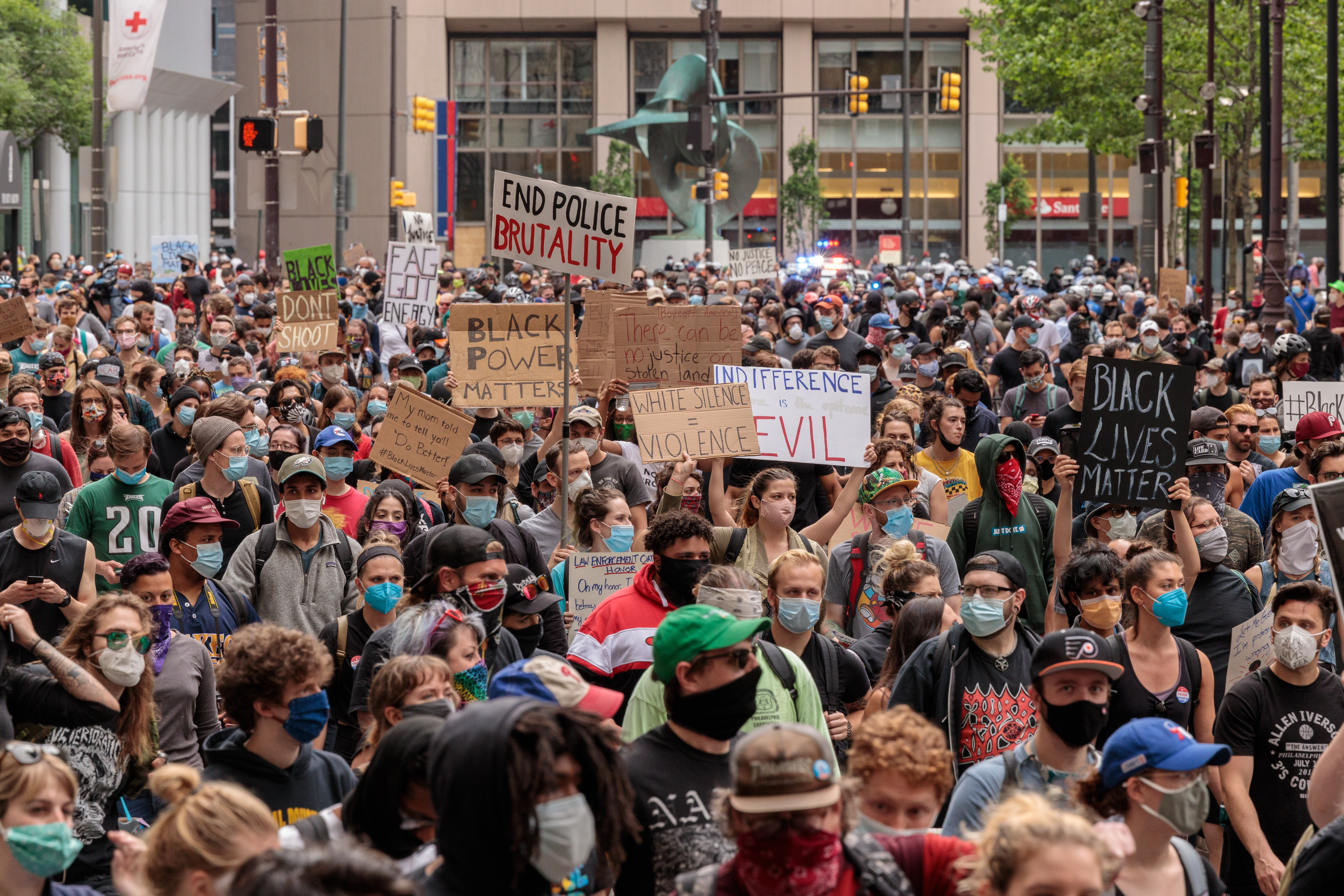
Masked protesters in Philadelphia on June 2, 2020

Over the Labor Day holiday weekend, which the Saturday marked 100 nights of protests since Floyd's murder, marches and rallies where held in many cities. In Miami, Florida, protesters on September 7, 2020, commemorated Floyd's murder and pressured local authorities to enact changes to policing policies, such as banning chokeholds during arrests.

To mark what would have been Floyd's 47th birthday, groups across the United States staged protest events on October 14, 2020. Rallies and vigils were held in Minneapolis, Brooklyn, and Los Angeles, among other places. In Portland, Oregon, where Black Lives Matter protests had been held daily since Floyd's murder, demonstrators staged a sit-in.

For some Black Americans, particularly a group interviewed in George Floyd's hometown in Houston, Texas, the protests over Floyd's murder transformed to greater political activity and increased voter turnout in the November 2020 election. Terrance Floyd, George's brother, and other family members rallied voters in support of the candidacy of Joe Biden, and they made an appearance with the Biden family at a campaign event in Tallahassee, Florida. Terrence Floyd also rallied voters in New York City on the November 3, 2020, Election Day.

By December, the protest movement was still "deeply rooted" at George Floyd Square, an occupied protest of the East 38th Street and Chicago Avenue intersection in Minneapolis where Floyd was murdered.

==== 2021 ====
In many parts of the United States, protests over Floyd's murder gradually diminished over time. In Portland, Oregon, however, Floyd's murder resulted in a yearlong period of "near-continuous protests" over racial injustice and police violence, at times featuring clashes between demonstrators and authorities and resulting in property damage.

In Boston, activists rallied on March 4, 2021, to demand the conviction of all four officers present at the scene of Floyd's murder and for local authorities to investigate past cases where police officers used excessive force. Two days later, thousands marched in Boston to call for justice for Floyd as part of a coordinated, 17-state set of rallies. In Salt Lake City, activists protested Floyd's murder by staging a car caravan on March 6, 2021. Prayer vigils seeking justice for Floyd were held in conjunction with the Chauvin trial at several locations. In Houston, Texas, Floyd's family held an event on April 9, 2021. In Maryland, a group gathered to pray that for justice for Floyd and his family as the jury began deliberations in the Chauvin criminal trial on April 19, 2021. As a jury deliberated in Chauvin's criminal trial, a vigil for Floyd was held on April 19, 2021, in Melbourne, Florida.

People in many cities in the United States reacted to Chauvin's murder conviction on April 20, 2021, with largely peaceful demonstrations. Some jurisdictions had proactively mobilized National Guard troops and declared states of emergency in preparation for possible violence, and some businesses had boarded up to prevent potential looting. Many activists perceived the guilty verdict as just one step in the process to obtain justice over Floyd's murder. At nearly a year after Floyd's murder, civil rights activists continued to call for passage of the federal George Floyd Justice in Policing Act. Many activists believed that "justice for George Floyd" required changing the systems of policing and criminal justice in a way that would have prevented his murder.

On April 23, 2021, in Austin, Texas, activists rallied outside the state's capitol to call for passage of the Texas' George Floyd Act—reform legislation introduced to ban chokeholds and require officers to intervene to stop excessive use of force—that had stalled in the state legislature. On May 6, 2021, Black mothers led a march in Washington, D.C., to encourage passage federal police reform legislation named after Floyd. On May 19, 2021, in Nevada, protesters jammed phone lines to the state legislature after police reform legislation introduced as result of the global protest movement begun by Floyd's murder did not advance.

By late May 2021, Floyd's murder, and the video of it, had given way to a yearlong, nationwide movement featuring the largest mass protests in United States history. To commemorate the one-year anniversary of his murder in a several-day event titled "One Year, What's Changed", the George Floyd Memorial Foundation, a non-profit organization founded by Floyd's family, planned marches and rallies in Minneapolis, New York, and Houston for May 23, 2021, and called for two days of virtual activism everywhere in the United States in support of federal police reform legislation.

At a rally in New York City outside Brooklyn Borough Hall on May 23, 2021, Terrance Floyd, George's brother, called on the crowd to continue advocating for police reform and for communities to "stay woke". Civil rights activist Al Sharpton said, "convicting Chauvin is not enough", and encouraged congress to pass the George Floyd Justice in Policing Act, as well as continued activism ahead of the criminal trials of Lane, Kueng, and Thao and the federal civil rights trial of all four officers.

By May 25, 2021, the anniversary of Floyd's murder, the United States had experienced a yearlong movement to address racial injustice in policing. Several street protests were held in many locations in the United States to mark the anniversary. There was mass disturbance on May 25, 2021, to mark the anniversary of George Floyd's murder including rioting but situations were finally said to have calmed down in the early hours of May 26, 2021. In New York City, protesters marched and then knelt for 9 minutes and 29 seconds while blocking traffic. A rally in Portland, Oregon, was peaceful in the afternoon, but at night, 150 demonstrators set fire to a dumpster outside the Multnomah County Justice Center and damaged other property. Police declared the gathering a riot and made five arrests. Most demonstrations—which included street marches, prayer services, and festivals—in the United States were peaceful. At many rallies, protesters expressed disappointment with the lack of change to policing policies and budgets, and some said they would continue protesting and advocating for their desired goals.

=== International ===
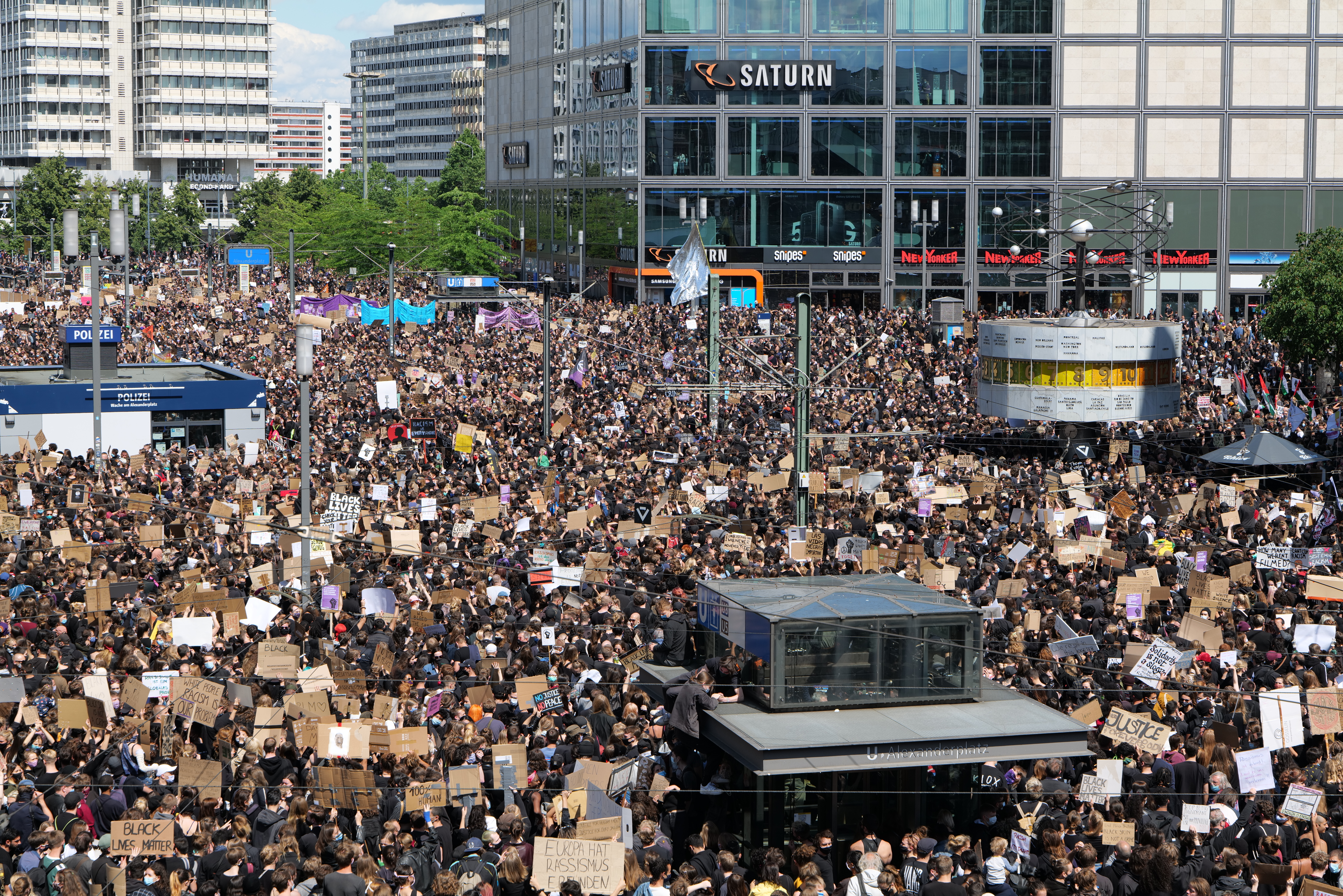
Protest at Alexanderplatz in Berlin on June 6, 2020

Floyd's murder came as the global Black Lives Matter movement had been slowly building for years, but outrage over what was captured in a bystander's video and Floyd's dying words, "I can't breathe", resulted in solidarity protests in more than 50 countries and led to what was described as a "social awakening" on issues of racial injustice and brought renewed attention on past police brutality cases. Protests in Canada, Europe, Oceania, Asia, and Africa rallied against what they perceived as racial discrimination and police brutality, with some protests aimed at United States embassies.

Over the weekend of June 6 and 7, surfers around the world held a "Paddle Out", which is a Hawaiian mourning tradition. The tribute was held for George Floyd and all the lives lost to police violence. Thousands observed the tradition in Honolulu, Hawaii, La Jolla, Hermosa Beach and Santa Monica, California, Galveston, Hackensack, New Jersey, Rockaway Beach, New York, Biarritz, France, Senegal and Australia.

By the conclusion of the criminal trial of Derek Chauvin on April 20, 2021, millions of people worldwide had viewed video footage of Floyd's murder and protests were ongoing internationally over issues of police brutality and systemic racism. The murder conviction of Chauvin was celebrated by activists in many countries and several of them expressed their desire for further progress on racial justice and police accountability issues. Protesters globally called on lawmakers in the United States to address the issues of police violence and the police-state structure.

Protesters in London rallied outside the United States embassy on May 22, 2021. Protesters remarked that the Chauvin murder conviction was "a small amount of justice of what [George Floyd] really deserves". The protest was among of new set of peaceful protests in the United Kingdom to mark the one-year anniversary of Floyd's murder. On May 25, 2021, protesters took the streets in Germany and demonstrators took a knee in and raised their fists at rallies in Glasgow, London, and Edinburgh. Rallies were held outside U.S. Embassies in Greece and Spain.

For some, the so-called "George Floyd effect" had demonstrators and activists connecting historic racism and social injustice to contemporary, local examples of police brutality. Movements spawned by Floyd's murder, which served as a catalyst, were still active in Australia, Brazil, India, Japan, New Zealand, Nigeria, United Kingdom, and elsewhere by May 2021. In Canada and France, where Floyd's murder initiated protests, activists were unsatisfied with the levels of reform made by officials at nearly a year after Floyd's murder.

In Australia, the Black Lives Matter movement sparked calls for white people to be more aware of race relations within the country. "Australia Day" is celebrated in the nation as the date the country was founded. The Black Lives Matter movement in Australia sought emphasis on acknowledging the colonial history of Australia, however, by changing "Australia Day" to "Invasion Day" in recognition of the Aboriginal and Torres Strait Islander people who were massacred when the European settlement was established in Australia on January 26, 1788.

In Japan, the Black Lives Matter movement seemed to become more prominent after the murder of George Floyd. Scholars cite evidence that the global movement was illustrated in Japan through transnational connective action. Because Japan as a more homogenous country as compared to the United States, there was a more culturally specific meaning to the movement, and much of the activism in Japan also sought conversations about colorism. Naomi Osaka, a Japanese-American tennis player, expressed excitement as she had never seen a Black Lives matter protest in Japan before 2020. Along with other athletes, Osaka also put out statements withdrawing from an athletic tournament to protest the murder of George Floyd and similar incidents. Her statements, in English and Japanese, discussed her identity as a woman of color and sought to bring public attention to the issue of racial violence. However, celebrity activism in Japan is generally not as accepted as in the United States, and her statements faced some criticism in both America and Japan.

In Nigeria, many protests took place in October 2020 surrounding the issue of police brutality. On October 20, 2020, unarmed protesters were shot by nearby police forces, resulting in 20 casualties. This event, now known as Black Tuesday or the Lekki tollgate massacre, has brought increased attention to the ENDSARS movement in Nigeria, which seeks to end Nigeria's Special Anti-Robbery Squad, also known as SARS. Reports of SARS' torture and extrajudicial killings had sparked protests for years before 2020. However, the murder of George Floyd increased protests against police brutality in an international context, with Black transnational activism in Nigeria condemning their domestic police forces and those who they believe perpetuate police brutality internationally.

== Government response ==
=== United States ===
States that activated the National Guard in response to the protests by June 16, 2020

At least 200 cities in the U.S. had imposed curfews by early June 2020, while more than 30 states and Washington, D.C., activated over 96,000 National Guard and State Guard service members. The deployment constituted the largest military operation other than war in U.S. history.

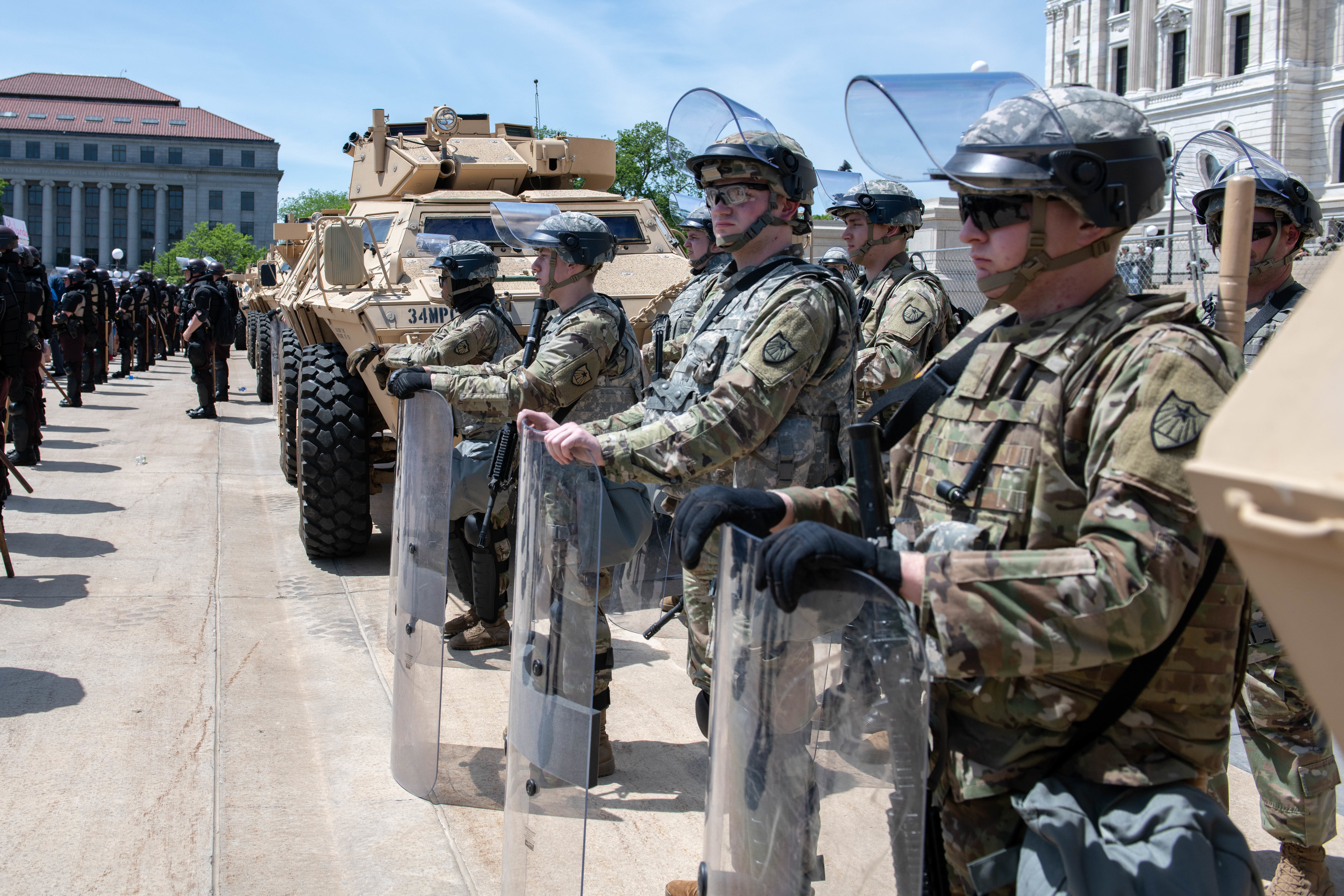
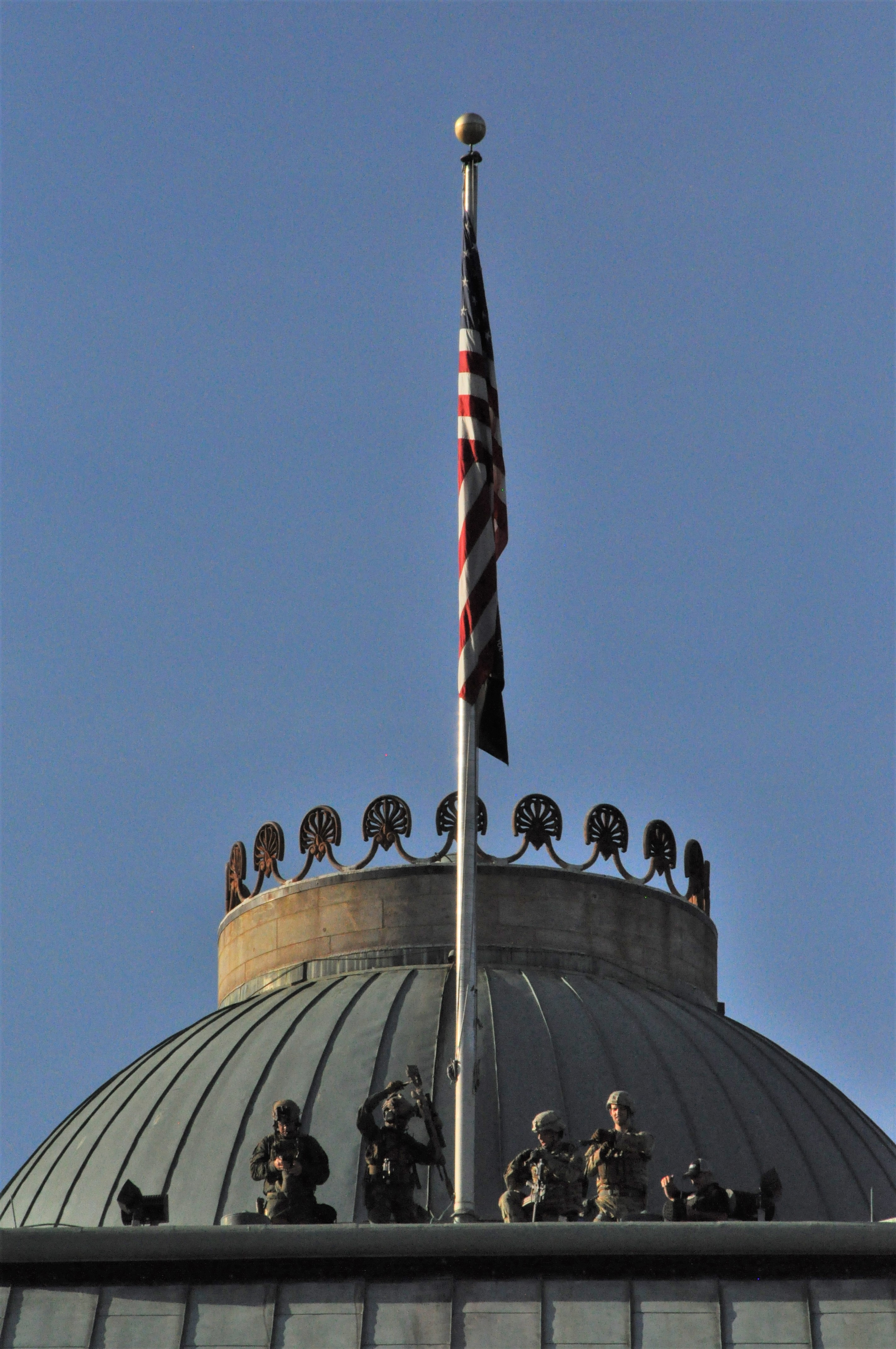
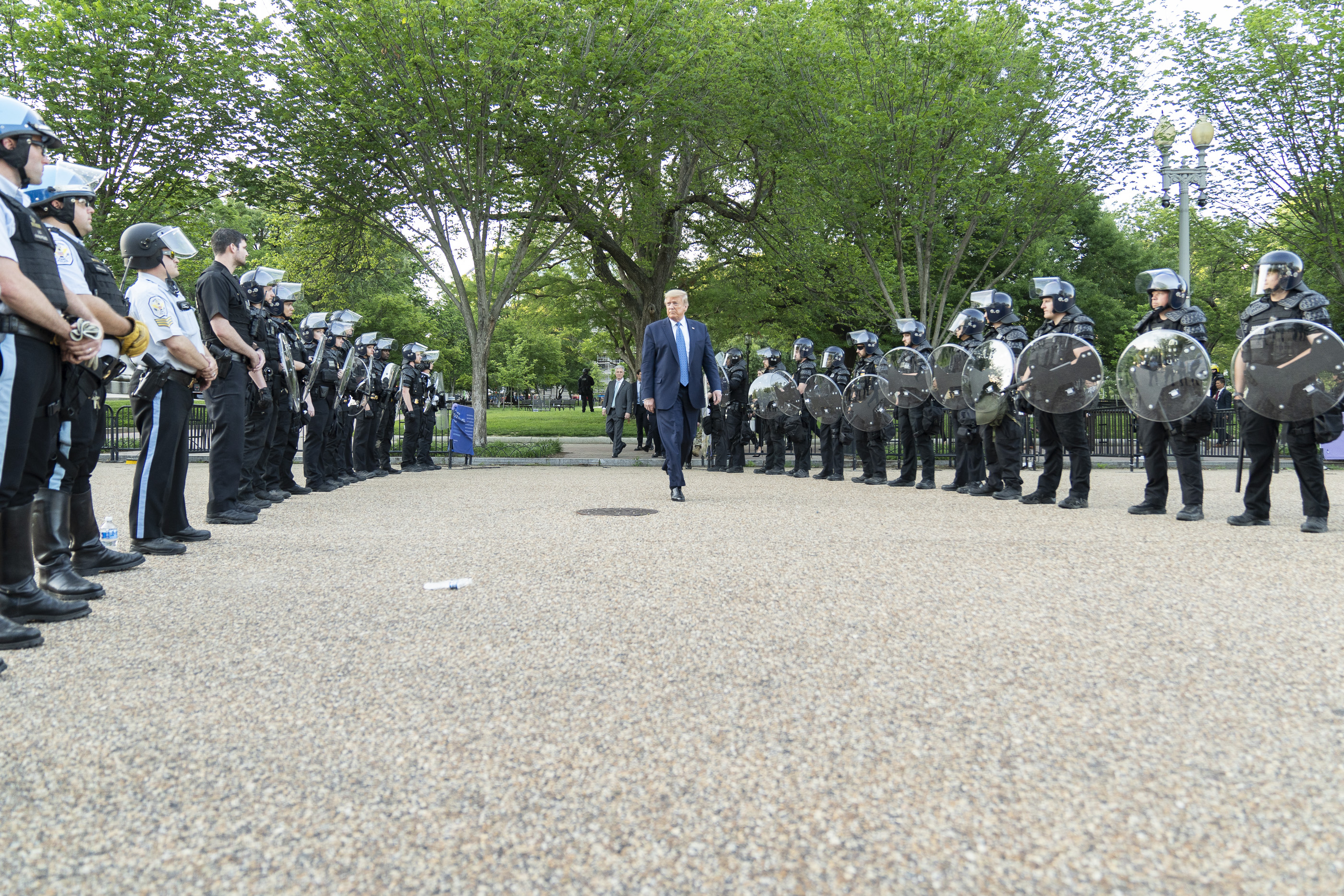
Top: Minnesota National Guard behind police at the Minnesota State Capitol on May 31, 2020
Middle: National Guard snipers atop the North Carolina State Capitol building on June 1, 2020
Bottom: President Donald Trump walks to St. John's Church amid protests in Washington, D.C., on June 1, 2020

United States President Donald Trump demanded governors and city governments crackdown on protesters and controversially threatened to deploy the 82nd Airborne and 3rd Infantry Regiment in response to the unrest. On May 29, Trump tweeted "when the looting starts, the shooting starts", which Twitter marked as "glorifying violence". Trump later said he was not advocating violence, noting that the tweet could be read as either a threat or a statement of fact and that he intended for it to be read as "a combination of both". On June 3, he said "If a city or state refuses to take the actions necessary to defend the life and property of their residents, then I will deploy the United States military and quickly solve the problem." This would have required invoking the Insurrection Act of 1807, last used to quell the 1992 Los Angeles riots on May 1, 1992, by Executive Order 12804. Arkansas senator Tom Cotton also pushed for the U.S. Army's 101st Airborne Division to be deployed to quell the unrest, calling protesters "Antifa terrorists". Massachusetts Representative Seth Moulton said federal troops should "lay down [their] arms" if deployed in the United States.

On June 4, federal agencies added about 1.7 miles (2.7 km) of fencing around the White House, Lafayette Square, and The Ellipse. Protesters used the fencing to post signs and artwork expressing their views. On June 11, the fencing was taken down, and some signs were collected by Smithsonian Museum curators from the National Museum of African American History and Culture. U.S. Customs and Border Protection, authorized to provide aerial surveillance "to assist law enforcement and humanitarian relief efforts" when requested, provided drone imagery during the protests.

As of June 5, 2020, 2,950 federal law enforcement personnel from a dozen agencies, including the Secret Service, Capitol Police, Park Police, Customs and Border Protection, FBI's Hostage Rescue Team, Bureau of Prisons' Special Operations Response Team, DEA's Special Response Team, ATF, and Marshals Service's Special Operations Group, have been dispatched to assist local authorities, with most of them being garrisoned in D.C. The DEA's legal authority was specifically expanded by the Department of Justice beyond usual limits to include surveillance of protesters and the ability to arrest for non-drug related offenses. In response, Representatives Jerry Nadler and Karen Bass of the House Judiciary Committee denounced the move and requested a formal briefing from DEA Acting Administrator Timothy Shea.

From at least July 14, 2020, unidentified federal officers wearing camouflage used unmarked vans to detain protesters in Portland, Oregon—sometimes without explaining the reason for their arrest. The American Civil Liberties Union (ACLU) called these actions unconstitutional kidnappings. In The Nation, Jeet Heer also called the actions unconstitutional and wrote that "The deployment of unidentified federal officers is particularly dangerous in... Portland and elsewhere in America, because it could easily lead to right-wing militias' impersonating legal authorities and kidnapping citizens."

On July 20, 2020, the Chicago Tribune reported that the Department of Homeland Security was preparing to send 150 federal agents to Chicago.

On June 26, 2020, President Trump signed an executive order permitting federal agencies to provide personnel "to assist with the protection of Federal monuments, memorials, statues, or property". Following the executive order, the Department of Homeland Security sent officers from Customs and Border Protection to Portland, Oregon, Seattle, and Washington, D.C. This was a departure from Homeland Security's normal role of protecting against threats from abroad. Critics accused federal authorities of overstepping their jurisdiction and using excessive force against protesters. Oregon governor Kate Brown called for federal agents to scale back their response and criticized Trump's actions: "President Trump deploying armed federal officers to Portland only serves to escalate tensions and, as we saw yesterday, will inevitably lead to unnecessary violence and confrontation." Portland mayor Ted Wheeler demanded the agents be removed after citizens were detained far from the federal property agents were sent to protect.

In the wake of the George Floyd protests, Republicans in state legislatures nationwide pushed for legislation targeting protesters. The bills, which conflate peaceful protests, riots and looting, imposed harsher punishment on individuals found guilty of unlawful assembly and public disorder, as well as provided immunity for motorists that hit protesters. The Florida anti-riot law was struck down as unconstitutional by a federal district judge, on the grounds of vagueness, freedom of assembly, freedom of speech, and due process. The law also made it a felony to destroy historically commemorative objects and structures, and in response to calls to "defund the police" requires police departments to justify budget reductions. Months after Derek Chauvin's sentencing, another police officer involved in the case, Thomas Lane was sentenced to 3 years in prison on September 21, 2022.

=== International ===
==== France ====
In France, the government banned demonstrations near the United States Embassy and Eiffel Tower in Paris out of concern for potential violence. In France, thousands protested against the country's history of racial injustice and police violence, which differs from that of the U.S. In Paris, demonstrators were joined by the family of Adama Traoré, a 24-year-old who died in police custody in 2016 after being restrained. No one was charged in his death. "We demand justice, not conversation," said his sister, Assa Traoré, vowing to continue weekly protests if necessary.

== Violence and controversies ==
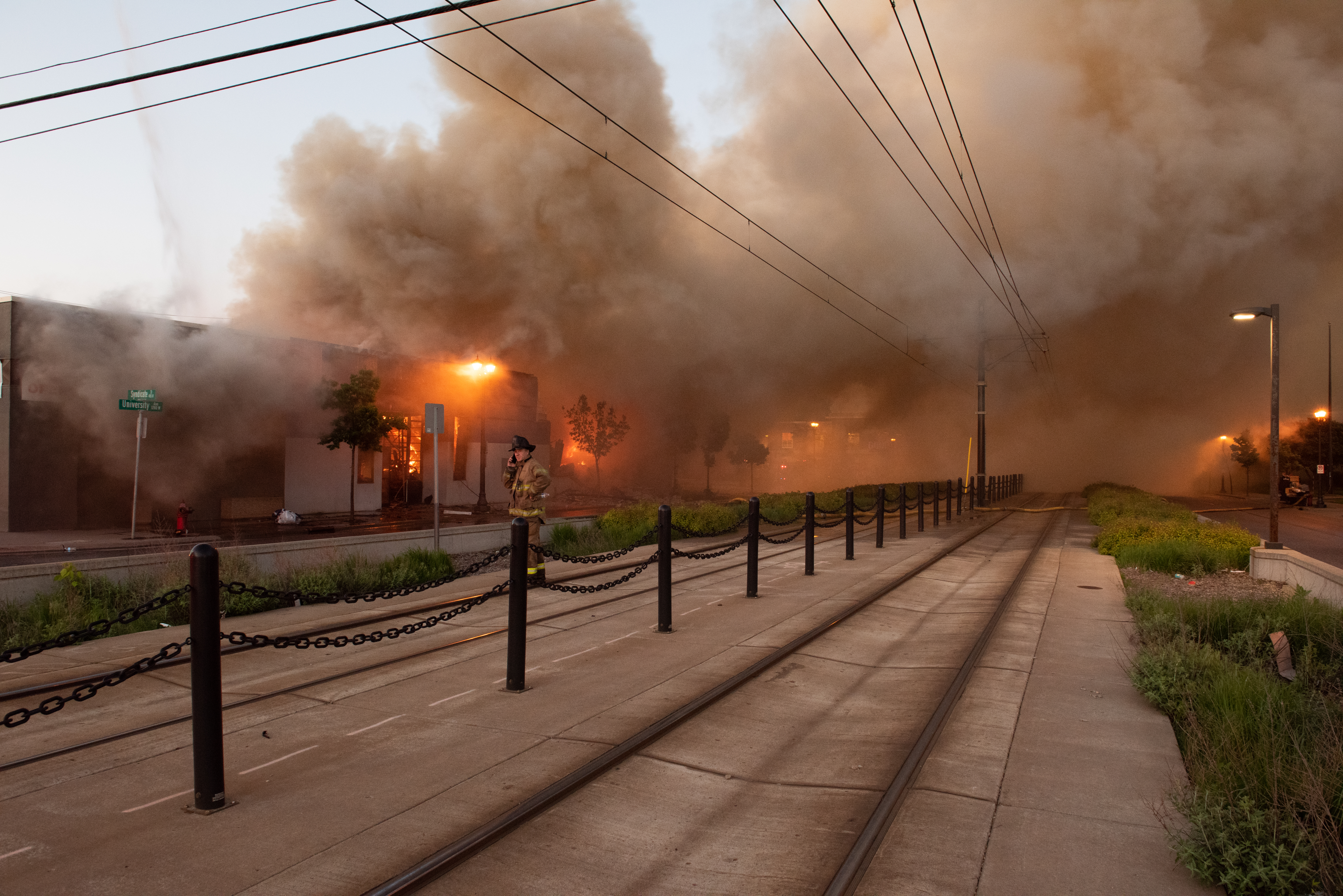
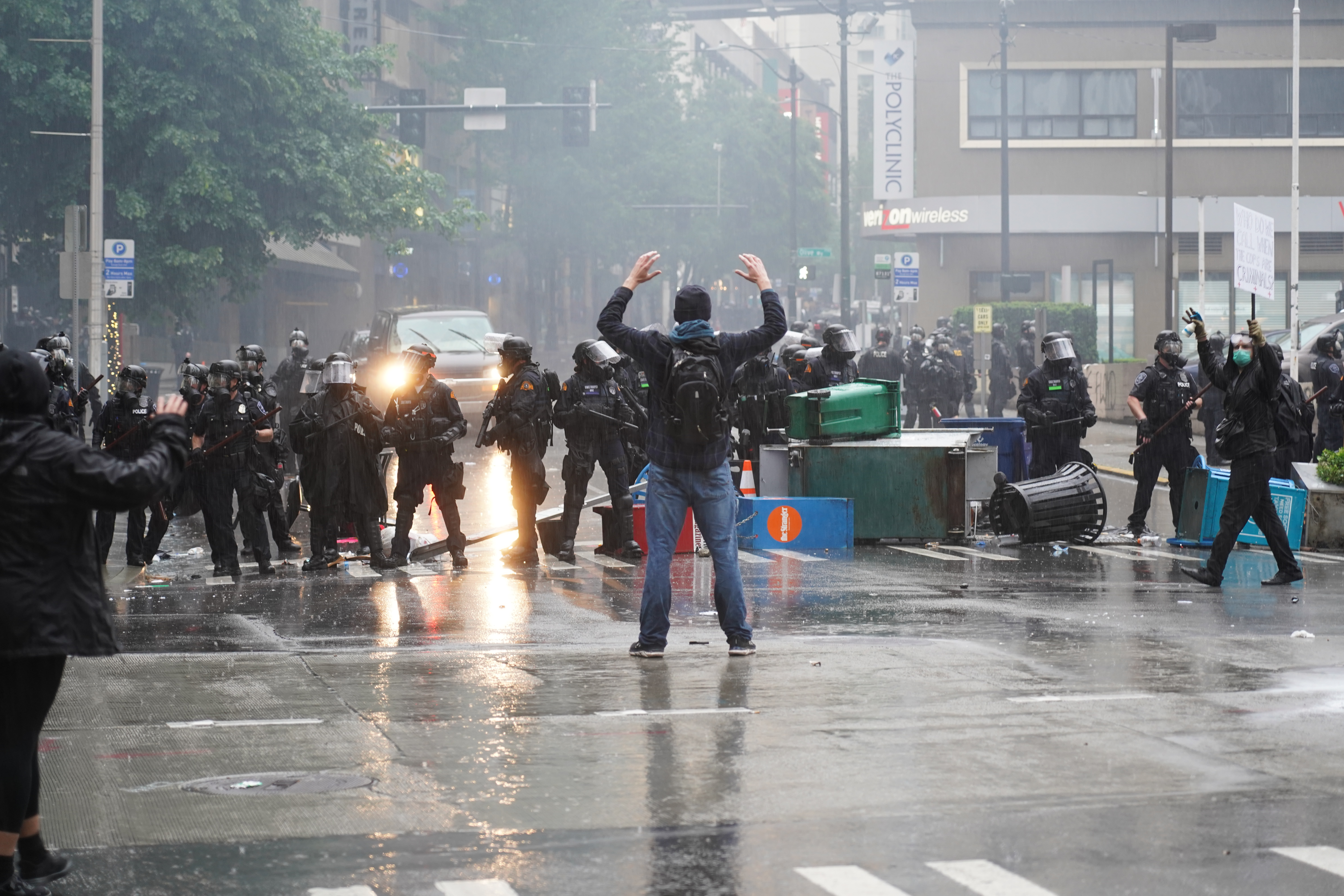
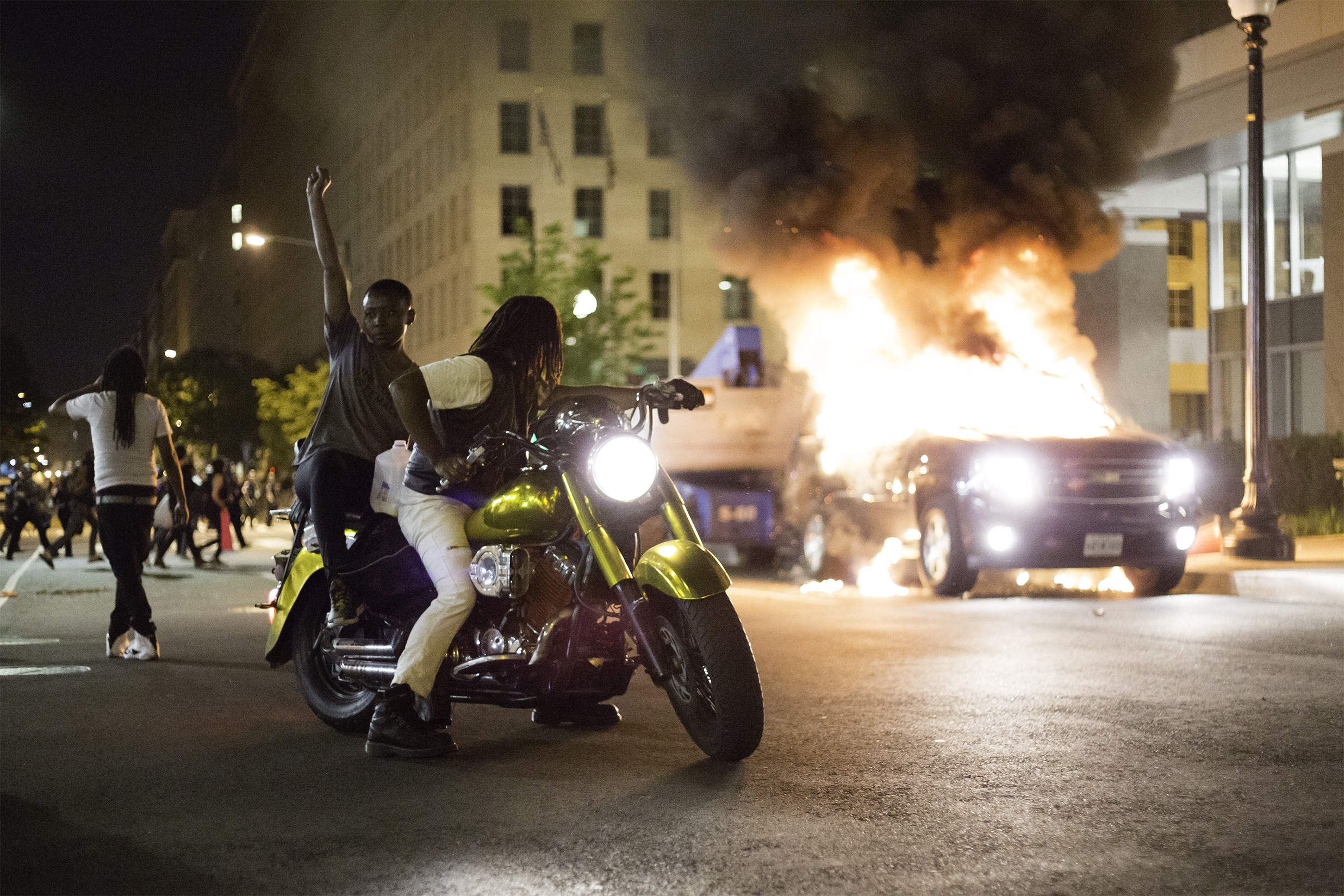
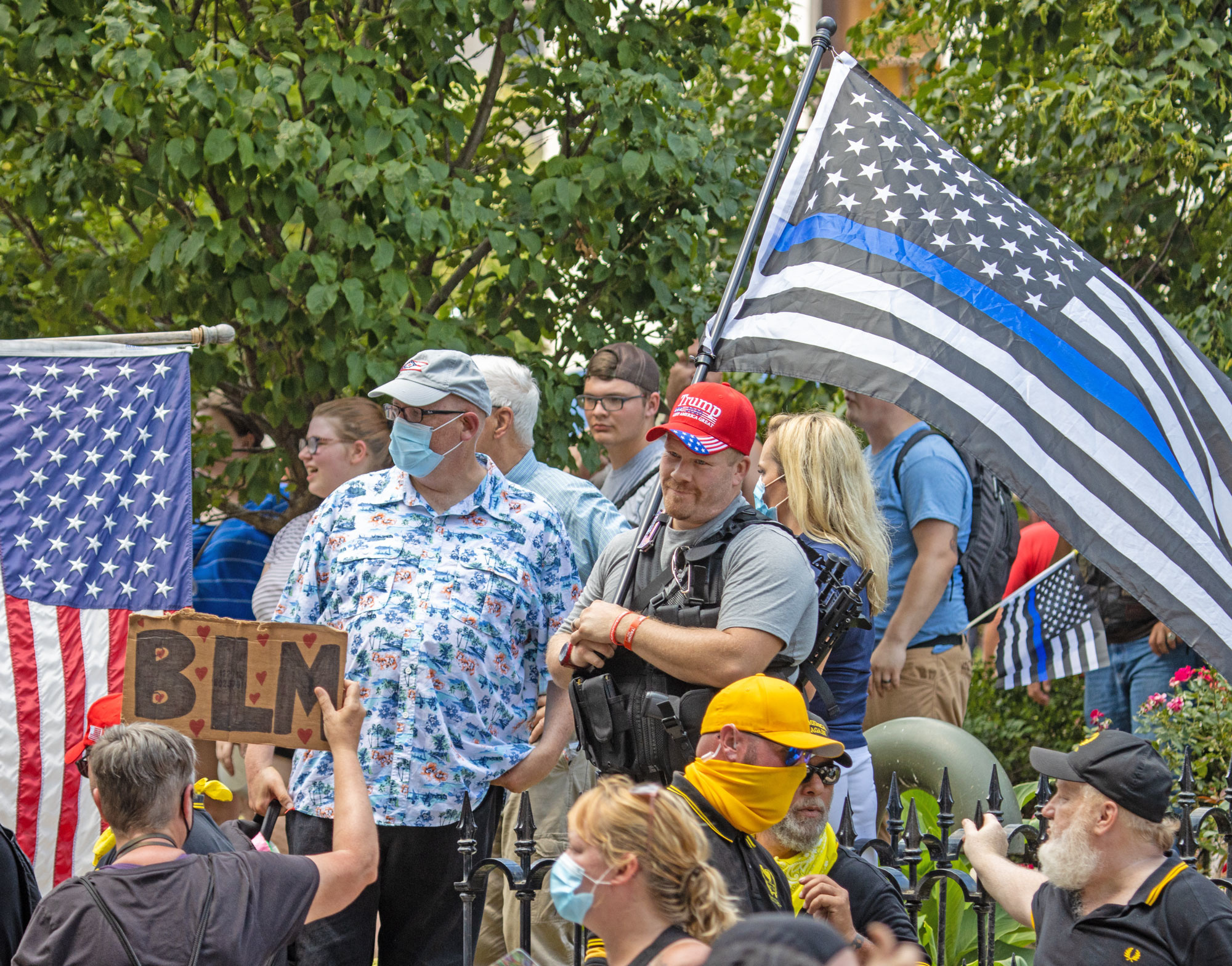
From top:
1. Burning buildings amid riots in Saint Paul, Minnesota, on May 29
2. Police and protesters stand off in Seattle on May 30
3. Vehicles on fire during a riot in Washington, D.C., on May 30
4. Georgia National Guard and police clash with protesters in Atlanta in late May-early June
5. Protesters and counter-protesters faceoff in Columbus, Ohio, on July 18

By June 22, 2020, police had made 14,000 arrests in 49 cities since the protests began, with most arrests being locals charged with low-level offenses such as violating curfews or blocking roadways. By June 8, 2020, at least 19 people had died during the protests. Several protests over Floyd's murder, including one in Chicago, turned into riots. On May 29, 2020, civil rights leader Andrew Young stated that riots, violence, and looting "hurt the cause instead of helping it" while George Floyd's family also denounced the violent protests. A study conducted by the Armed Conflict Location and Event Data Project found that about 93% of 7,750 protests from May 26 through August 22 remained peaceful and nondestructive.

There have been numerous reports and videos of aggressive police actions using physical force including "batons, tear gas, pepper spray and rubber bullets on protesters, bystanders and journalists, often without warning or seemingly unprovoked". These incidents have provoked "growing concern that aggressive law enforcement tactics intended to impose order were instead inflaming tensions". The police responded that such tactics are necessary to prevent vandalism and arson, and that police officers themselves have been assaulted with thrown rocks and water bottles. Amnesty International issued a press release on May 31, 2021, calling for the police to end excessive militarized responses to the protests. A project by ProPublica compiled 68 videos during the George Floyd protests of police officers who used what appeared to researchers to be excessive levels of force. By a year later, police departments had disciplined 10 officers in connection to those captured on video.

Multiple police officers were shot or attacked during the protests. Four officers were shot in St. Louis after facing violent protesters who had been looting and vandalising local businesses. In Las Vegas, a policer officer was shot in the head at Circus Circus Hotel and Casino whilst they were fighting a suspect. Law enforcement officers were also injured by vehicles in Denver and New York City and hit by projectiles elsewhere in the U.S.A. In New York City, nearly 400 officers were injured following two weeks of protesting. Injuries resulted from being hit by moving vehicles and being hit in the head with objects such as bricks and bottles. In one incident in Los Angeles, two officers were shot whilst sitting in their patrol car and protesters blocked the responding ambulance from entering the hospital whilst shouting "we hope they die". In London, protesters threw objects at police, and picked up and threw temporary barriers at the gates of Downing Street where officers were stationed prompting more officers to enter the area. In all, twenty-seven officers were injured in London, with fourteen officers injured when protesters clashed with mounted police, with Metropolitan Police Commissioner Cressida Dick saying it was "shocking and completely unacceptable".

At least 104 incidents of vehicles driving into crowds of protesters, including eight involving police officers, were recorded from May 27 to September 5, with 39 drivers charged. According to experts some incidents involved frightened drivers surrounded by protesters while other incidents involved angry drivers or were politically motivated. Since 2015, such actions have been encouraged against Black Lives Matter protests by "Run Them Over" and "All Lives Splatter" memes online, as well as items posted on Fox News and on social media by police officers. In Buffalo, three Buffalo Police Department officers were struck by a car, and in Minneapolis, a Minnesota National Guard soldier fired 3 rounds at a speeding vehicle that was driving towards police officers and soldiers.

There were allegations of foreign influence stoking the unrest online, with the role of outside powers being additive rather than decisive as of May 31. Several analysts have said that there was a lack of evidence for foreign meddling – whether to spread disinformation or sow divisiveness – but suggest that the messaging and coverage from these countries has more to do with global politics.

=== Police attacks on journalists ===
According to the U.S. Press Freedom Tracker, at least 100 journalists have been arrested while covering the protests, while 114 have been physically attacked by police officers. Although some journalists have been attacked by protesters, over 80% of incidents involving violence against the news media were committed by law enforcement officers. The Committee to Protect Journalists has accused police officers of intentionally targeting news crews in an attempt to intimidate them from covering the protests. Some journalists covering the protests in Minneapolis had their tires slashed by Minnesota State Patrol troopers and Anoka County sheriff's deputies.

=== Injuries caused by police projectiles ===
During the week of May 30, 2020, 12 people, including protesters, journalists and bystanders, were partially blinded after being struck with police projectiles. By June 21, at least 20 people had suffered serious eye injuries. The American Academy of Ophthalmology has called on police departments to stop using rubber bullets for crowd control, writing in a statement that "Americans have the right to speak and congregate publicly and should be able to exercise that right without the fear of blindness."

=== Extremist participation ===
As unrest grew in the days after Floyd's murder, there was speculation by federal, state, and local officials that various extremist groups using the cover of the protests to foment general unrest in the United States. Officials initially provided few details to the public about the claims.

Donald Trump, FBI Director Christopher A. Wray, New York City Mayor Bill de Blasio, United States Attorney General William Barr, Atlanta Mayor Keisha Lance Bottoms, Seattle Police Guild President Mike Solan, and Huntsville Police Chief Mark McMurray blamed anarchists and "far-left extremist" groups, including Antifa, for inciting and organizing violent riots. According to a Justice Department spokesperson, Barr came to this conclusion after being provided with information from state and local law enforcement agencies.

Contrastingly, several mid-June investigations by news agencies including The Washington Post and the Associated Press concluded there was no solid evidence of Antifa involvement in causing violence during the protests, contradicting prior claims by law enforcement officials, and the Trump administration provided no further evidence for its claims. This is in part because "Antifa is a moniker, not a single group", making it difficult to attribute any violence directly to the movement.

The majority of protests in the aftermath of Floyd's murder were peaceful; among the 14,000 arrests made, most were for minor offenses such as alleged curfew violations or blocking a roadway. An analysis of state and federal criminal charges of demonstrators in the Minneapolis area found that disorganized crowds had no single goal or affiliation, many opportunist crowds amassed spontaneously during periods of lawlessness, and that people causing destruction had contradictory motives for their actions. Other analysis found that persons involved in visible crimes such as arson or property damage were not ideologically organized, although some were motivated by anger towards police. Episodes of looting were committed by "regular criminal groups" and street gangs and were motivated by personal gain rather than ideology. A large number of white nationalists did not appear in response to the protests, although "a handful of apparent lone actors" were arrested for attempting to harm protesters. However, there was a scattered number of armed paramilitary-style militia movement groups and there were "several cases where members of these groups discharged firearms, causing chaos or injuring protesters".

According to the Institute for Research and Education on Human Rights (IREHR), which mapped the appearance of various right-wing or far-right actors or extremist groups at rallies throughout the United States, there were 136 confirmed cases of right-wing participation at the protests by June 19, 2020, with many more unconfirmed. Boogaloo, Three Percenters, Oath Keepers, Proud Boys, neo-Confederates, white nationalists, and an assortment of militias and vigilante groups reportedly had a presence at some protests, mostly in small towns and rural areas.

Boogaloo groups, who are generally pro-gun, anti-government, and far-right accelerationists, were reportedly present at least 40 George Floyd protests, several reportedly linked with violence. Their continued presence online has caused Facebook and TikTok to take action against their violent and anti-government posts. On July 25, 2020, 28-year old armed Black Lives Matter protester Garrett Foster was shot and killed in an altercation with a motorist in Downtown Austin. Foster identified with the boogaloo movement and had expressed anti-racist, libertarian, and anti-police views in his Facebook posts. Police said initial reports indicate that Foster was carrying an AK-47 style rifle, and was pushing his fiancée's wheelchair moments before he was killed.

By late 2020, the United States Attorney's office had charged three alleged adherents of Boogaloo Bois movement who attempted to capitalize on the unrest in Minneapolis in late May. Two had pled guilty by May 2021. According to the federal charging documents, the 30-year-old Michael Robert Solomon of New Brighton, Minnesota, who pled guilty to federal charges, recruited Boogaloo adherent participation via Facebook and at least five others traveled to Minneapolis to participate in the unrest. One of the persons, Benjamin Ryan Teeter, a 22-year old from Hampstead, North Carolina, also pled guilty to several federal criminal charges. Officials believed Teeter traveled to Minneapolis in the days after Floyd's murder to participate in rioting and looting and that he also had plans to destroy a courthouse with Solomon. A 26-year-old man from Boerne, Texas, who self-identified as a local leader of the Boogaloo movement, also faced federal riot charges for allegedly shooting 13 rounds from an AK-47-style machine gun into the Minneapolis third police precinct building while people were inside, looting it, and helping to set it on fire the night of May 28, 2020.

=== Perception of pervasiveness of violence ===
A December 2020 poll found 47% of Americans believed that the majority of the protests were violent, and 16% were unsure. A 2023 study found that viewers who primarily consumed conservative news responded to images of the George Floyd protests with significantly warmer feelings toward the police than those who did not consume conservative news, suggesting that conservative news audiences processed protest imagery differently. According to the Armed Conflict Location and Event Data Project, an estimated 93%–96.3% of demonstrations were peaceful and nondestructive, involving no injuries or no property damage. Police made arrests in about 5% of protest events (deploying chemical irritants in 2.5% of events); 3.7% of protest events were associated with property damage or vandalism (including damage by persons not involved in the actual demonstration); and protesters or bystanders were injured or killed in 1.6% of events.

== Media coverage ==
The protests were the subject of extensive media coverage, documentaries, and television specials. The documentary Say His Name: Five Days of George Floyd, released in February 2021, contained footage of protests and unrest in a neighborhood of Minneapolis in the five days that elapsed between Floyd's murder and the criminal charges being filed against Derek Chauvin. In August 2020, the occupied protests at 38th Street and Chicago Avenue in Minneapolis was the subject of a multi-part PBS News Hour series, "George Floyd Square: The epicenter of a protest movement that's swept the world" and in December 2020, it was the subject of a monthlong series by Minnesota Public Radio, "Making George Floyd's Square: Meet the people transforming 38th and Chicago".

Several documentaries and news specials were broadcast to coincide with first anniversary of Floyd's murder. The ABC-produced After Floyd: The Year that Shook America examined the "generation-defining movement" of Floyd's murder and Our America: A Year of Activism reflected on the year-long period of activism on social justice issues that followed. PBS-produced Race Matters: America After George Floyd reported on ongoing protests in communities over issues of police brutality a year after Floyd's murder.

The Minneapolis-based Star Tribune newspaper received the 2021 Pulitzer Prize for the breaking news it reported of Floyd's murder and the resulting aftermath. Danielle Frazier, the then 17-year old who filmed Floyd's arrest and murder on her cellphone, received a Pulitzer special citation recognition in 2021 for her video.

== Use of social media ==
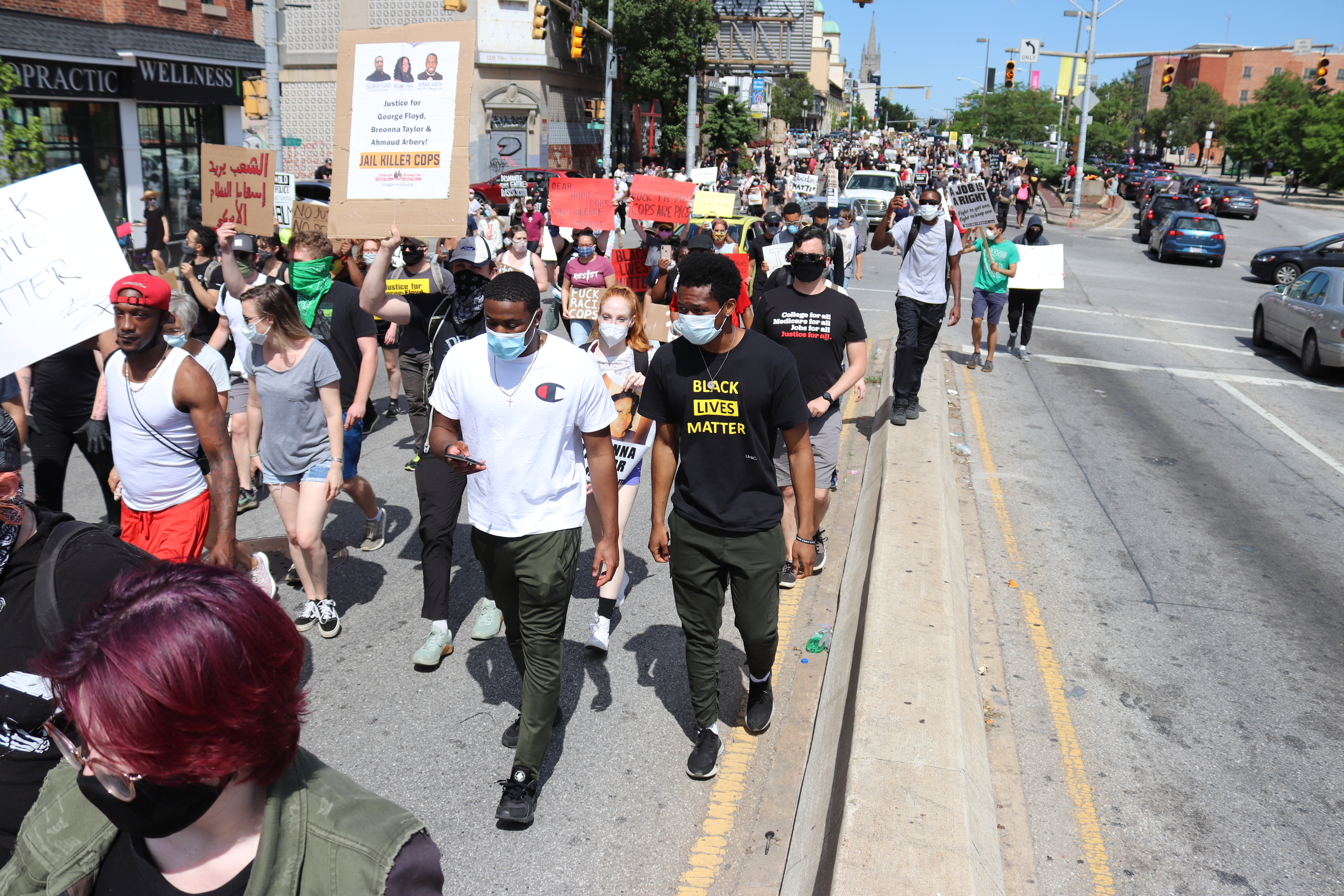
A George Floyd protest in Baltimore on May 30

The video recorded of Floyd's arrest and murder by Darnella Frazier on her mobile phone quickly went viral after she posted to Facebook a few hours later in the early morning hours of May 26. Public outrage over the contents of the video became an inflection point that sparked the largest civil-rights protests in U.S. history as Americans confronted topics of structural racism and police reform. Protests had continued for over a year after Floyd's murder.

Numerous individuals and celebrities used social media to document the protests, spread information, promote donation sites, and post memorials to George Floyd. Following Floyd's murder, a 15-year-old started a Change.org petition titled "Justice for George Floyd", demanding that all four police officers involved be charged. The petition was both the largest and fastest-growing in the site's history, reaching over 20 million signatures. During this time, multiple videos of the protests, looting, and riots were shared by journalists and protesters with many videos circulating widely on social media websites.

=== Documentation ===
A remix of Childish Gambino's song "This is America" and Post Malone's "Congratulations" was used heavily by protesters sharing footage of protests and police action on TikTok. Others used personal Twitter pages to post video documentation of the protests to highlight police and protesters actions, as well as points of the protests they felt would not be reported. One example was a viral photo that appears to show white women protesters standing with their arms locked between Louisville Metro Police Officers and protesters, with the caption describing the image and "This is love. This is what you do with your privilege."

Viral images of officers "taking a knee" with protesters and engaging in joint displays against police brutality, highlighted by hashtags such as #WalkWithUs, have circulated widely on social media. These acts have been identified by some cultural critics as copaganda, or "feel-good images" to boost public relations. Official social media accounts of police departments boosted positive images of collaboration. In some cases, these displays of solidarity, such as police kneeling, have been recognized as occurring moments before police teargassed crowds or inflicted violence on them. An article in The Fader characterized these acts as public relations tactics which were being undermined by police violence, "It feels like we go past the point of no return several times each day."

=== Activism ===
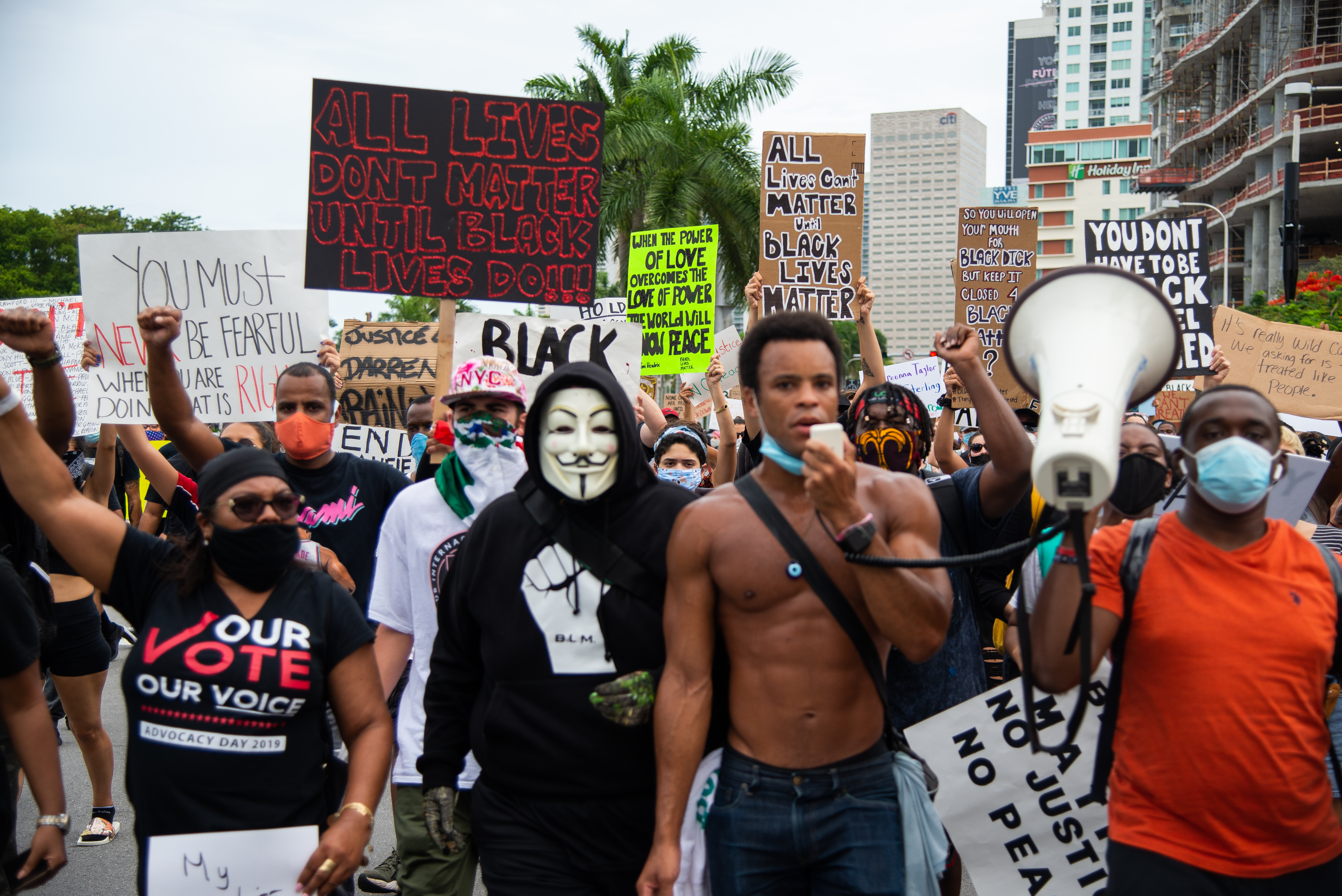
Protesters in Miami on June 6, 2020

American K-pop fan accounts hijacked right wing and pro-Trump hashtags on social media, flooding trending hashtags with images and videos of their favorite artists. Users attempting to look up the hashtags #WhiteLivesMatter, #WhiteoutWednesday and #BlueLivesMatter were met with messages and video clips of dancing idols. After the Dallas Police Department asked Twitter users to submit videos of protesters' illegal activity to its iWatch Dallas app, submissions of K-pop videos led to the temporary removal of the app due to "technical difficulties".

On May 28, hacktivist group Anonymous released a video to Facebook and the Minneapolis Police Department entitled "Anonymous Message To The Minneapolis Police Department", in which they state that they are going to seek revenge on the Minneapolis Police Department, and "expose their crimes to the world". According to Bloomberg, the video was initially posted on an unconfirmed Anonymous Facebook page. 269 gigabytes of leaked internal law enforcement data spanning 10 years obtained by Anonymous were later published by the activist group Distributed Denial of Secrets on June 19 to coincide with Juneteenth. The leak consisted of over a million documents, in what investigative journalist and founder of the group—Emma Best—called "the largest published hack of American law enforcement agencies". The leaked documents revealed that law enforcement agencies had been covertly monitoring protesters' private communication over social media, and that both federal and local law enforcement had been stoking fear among police officers, likely setting the stage for the escalation of violence against protesters by police.

Facebook's decision not to remove or label President Trump's tweet of "When the looting starts, the shooting starts" prompted complaints from Facebook employees that political figures were getting a special exemption from the site's content policies. Actions included internal petition, questioning the CEO at an employee town hall, some resignations, and an employee walkout.

On June 3, as U.S. protests gained momentum, Twitter CEO Jack Dorsey tweeted a recommendation for users to download end-to-end encryption (E2EE) messaging app Signal. On June 6, an estimated half million people joined protests in 550 places in the United States. By June 11, The New York Times reported that protest organizers relied on the E2EE app "to devise action plans and develop strategies for handling possible arrests for several years" and that downloads had "skyrocketed" with increased awareness of police monitoring leading protesters to use the app to communicate among themselves. During the first week of June, the encrypted messaging app was downloaded over five times more than it had been during the week prior to Floyd's murder. Citizen, a community safety app, also experienced a high spike in downloads.

== Misinformation ==
=== Official statements ===
Minnesota Governor Tim Walz speculated that there was "an organized attempt to destabilize civil society", initially saying as many as 80% of the individuals had possibly come from outside the state, and the mayor of St. Paul, Melvin Carter, said everyone arrested in St. Paul on May 29 was from out of state. However, jail records showed that the majority of those arrested were in-state. At a press conference later the same day, Carter explained that he had "shared... arrest data received in [his] morning police briefing which [he] later learned to be inaccurate".

Numerous eyewitness accounts and news reporters indicated that tear gas was used to disperse protesters in Lafayette Square. Despite this evidence, U.S. Park Police officials said, "USPP officers and other assisting law enforcement partners did not use tear gas or OC Skat Shells to close the area at Lafayette Park", adding that they only used "pepper balls" and "smoke canisters". Donald Trump's presidential campaign demanded news outlets retract reports of "tear gas" use. President Trump called the reports "fake" and said "they didn't use tear gas."

=== Press statements ===
On the night of May 31, exterior lights on the north side of the White House went dark as usual at 11:00 pm, while protesters were demonstrating outside. The Guardian mistakenly reported that "in normal times, they are only ever turned off when a president dies." A 2015 stock photograph of the White House, edited to show the lights turned off, was shared tens of thousands of times online, including by Hillary Clinton. While the photograph did not depict the building at the time of the protests, Deputy White House Press Secretary Hogan Gidley confirmed that the lights "go out at about 11 p.m. almost every night".

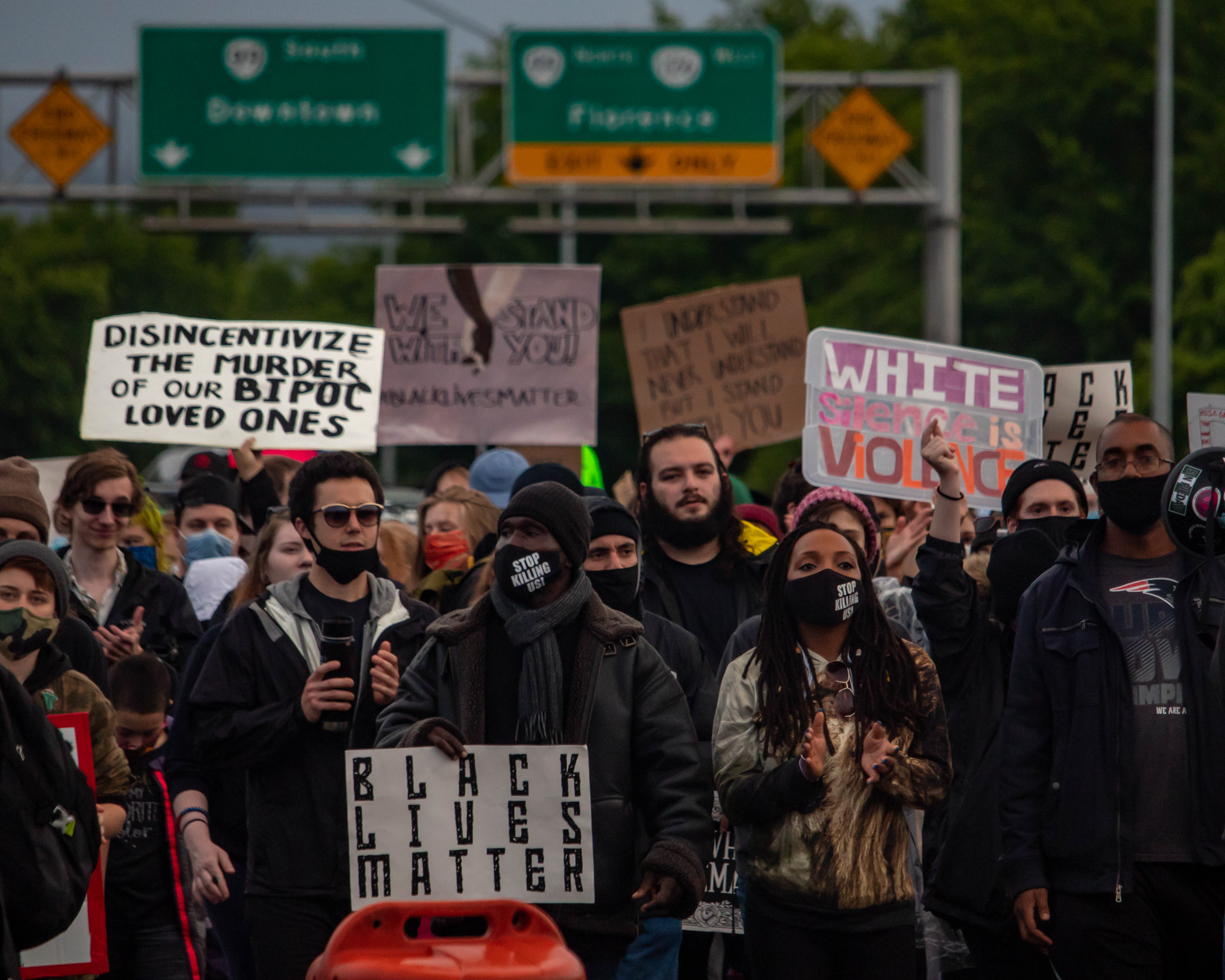
Protesters in Eugene, Oregon, on June 9, 2020

On June 6, the New York Post reported that a NYPD source said $2.4 million of Rolex watches had been looted during protests from a Soho Rolex store. However, the store in question was actually a Watches of Switzerland outlet that denied anything was stolen. Rolex confirmed that "no watches of any kind were stolen, as there weren't any on display in the store."

A June 12 article by The Seattle Times found that Fox News published a photograph of the Capitol Hill Autonomous Zone that had been digitally altered to include a man armed with an assault rifle. The Fox News website also used a photograph of a burning scene from the Minnesota protests to illustrate their articles on Seattle's protests. Fox removed the images and issued an apology, stating the digitally altered image was a collage that "did not clearly delineate" splicing.

=== Conspiracy theories ===
False claims of impending antifa activity as part of the protests circulated through social media platforms, causing alarm in at least 41 towns and cities. As a result of the rumors, several people were harassed. Hundreds of members of armed self-proclaimed militias and far right groups gathered in Gettysburg National Military Park on Independence Day in response to a fake online claim that antifa protesters were planning on burning the U.S. flag.

Some social media users spread images of damage from other protests or incidents, falsely attributing the damage to the George Floyd protests.

Twitter suspended hundreds of accounts associated with spreading a false claim about a communications blackout during protests in Washington, D.C., or a claim that authorities had blocked protesters from communicating on their smartphones. Also, some accounts shared a photo of a major fire burning near the Washington Monument, which was actually an image from a television show.

A study by Zignal Labs identified three dominant themes in misinformation and conspiracy theories around the protests: unsubstantiated claims of antifa involvement, claims that Floyd's murder had been faked, and claims of involvement by the billionaire investor and philanthropist George Soros.

== Impact ==
=== Social impact ===
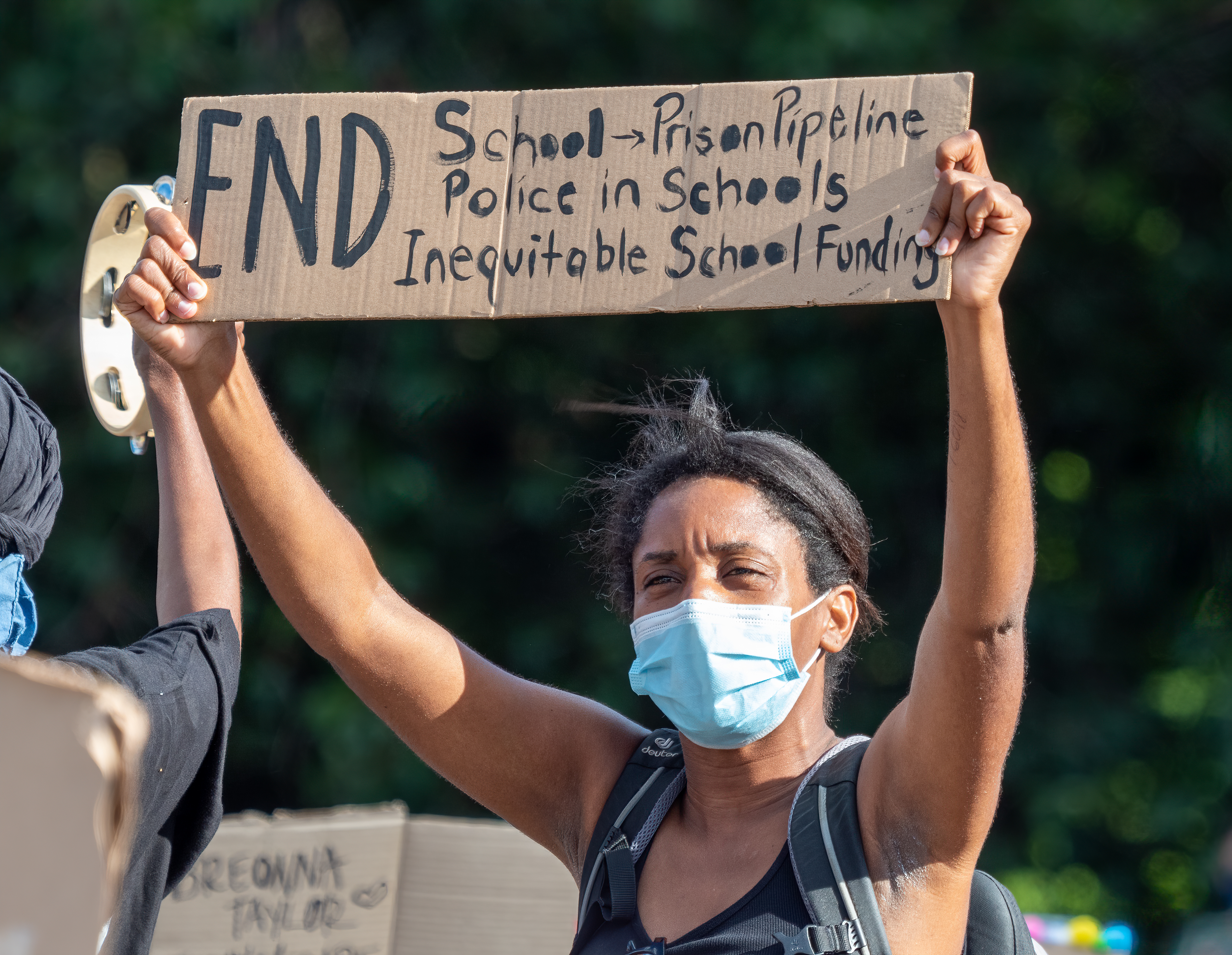
A protester in New York City holding a sign listing some demands

A week into the protests, The Washington Post stated that the current situation suggests that the status quo was undergoing a shock, with the article stating "the past days have suggested that something is changing. The protests reached into every corner of the United States and touched nearly every strand of society." Joe Biden told Politico that he had experienced an awakening and thought other White Americans had as well, saying: "Ordinary folks who don't think of themselves as having a prejudiced bone in their body, don't think of themselves as racists, have kind of had the mask pulled off." A number of journalistic and academic sources described the protests as forcing Americans to face racial inequality, police brutality and other racial and economic issues. Many stated that the unrest was due to the prevailing political and cultural habits of overlooking or ignoring forms of oppression of Black Americans. Politico said the murder of George Floyd, captured on video, had "prompted a reckoning with racism [...] for a wide swath of white America." Deva Woodly, Associate Professor of Politics at The New School for Social Research, wrote: "We are living in a world-historical moment." NPR said that "a change of attitude seems to have swept through the national culture like a sudden wind." CNN's Brianna Keilar said that "[y]ou are watching America's reckoning" as she outlined the "profound change" the country had experienced, including that in mid-June 15 of the 20 bestselling books were about race.

In late June, The Christian Science Monitor's editorial board wrote: "It may still be too soon to say the U.S. has reached a true inflection point in its treatment of its citizens of African descent. But it has certainly reached a reflection point." Reuters reported that Black candidates in June's primaries had benefited from "a national reckoning on racism." By early July, The Washington Post was running a regularly updated section titled "America's Racial Reckoning: What you need to know." On July 3, The Washington Post said that "the Black Lives Matter protests following the police killings of Breonna Taylor, George Floyd and Rayshard Brooks focused the world's attention on racial inequities, structural racism and implicit bias."

The New York Times described the events in the wake of Floyd's murder and video that circulated of it as "the largest protests in the United States since the Civil Rights era."

According to the American Political Science Review, the George Floyd protests led to a reduction in favorability toward the police among politically liberal Americans, and further exacerbated racial and political tensions and attitudes regarding the "race and law enforcement" debate in the U.S.

=== Economic impact ===
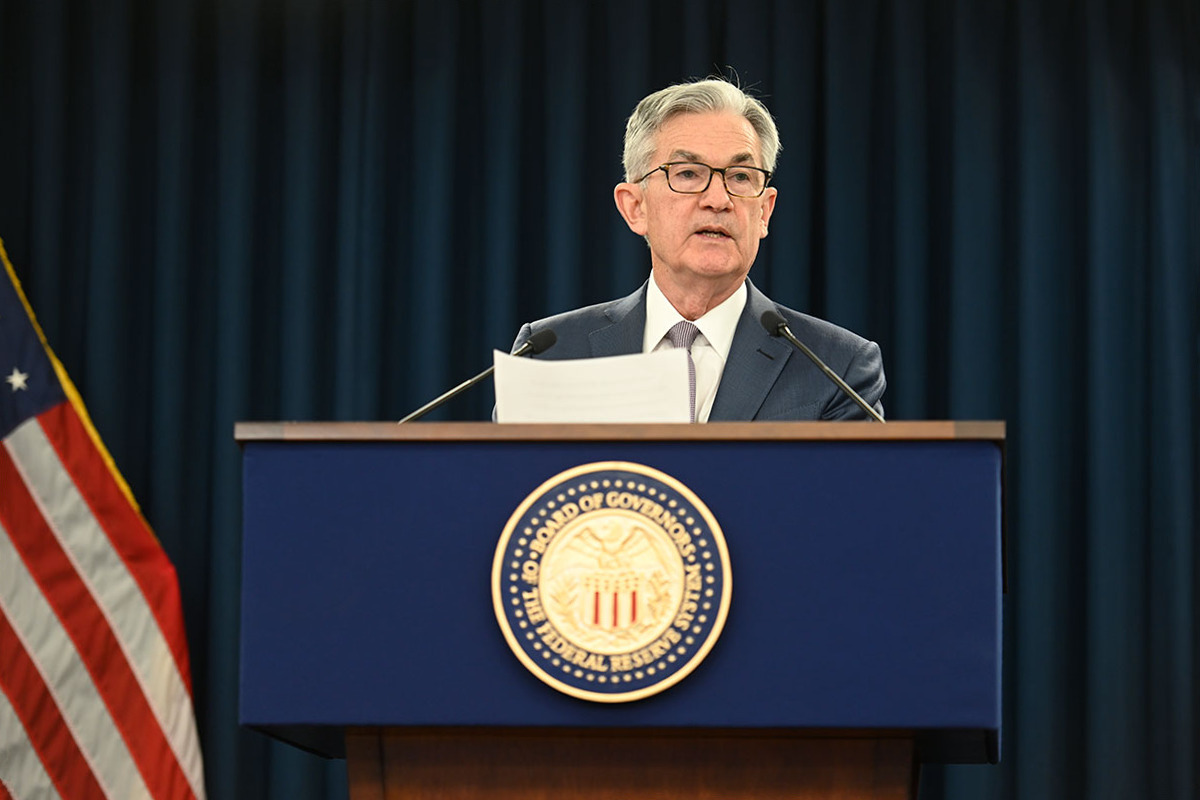
Federal Reserve Chairman Jerome Powell noted on June 10 "historically high unemployment" prevalent during the prelude of the protests.

The Property Claim Services (PCS) of the U.S. Insurance industry states that in the "unrest that took place from May 26 to June 8" 2020 in 140 U.S. cities in 20 states was "the costliest civil unrest in U.S. history", and that insured losses are "estimated at over $2 billion". According to Fortune, the economic impact of the protests exacerbated the COVID-19 recession by sharply curtailing consumer confidence, straining local businesses, and overwhelming public infrastructure with large-scale property damage. A number of small businesses, already suffering from the economic impact of the COVID-19 pandemic, were harmed by vandalism, property destruction, and looting. Curfews instated by local governments – in response to both the pandemic and protests – have also "restricted access to the downtown [areas]" to essential workers, lowering economic output. President Donald Trump, after announcing a drop in overall unemployment from 14.7% to 13.3% on June 5, stated that strong economic growth was "the greatest thing [for race relations]" and "George Floyd would have been proud [of the unemployment rate]". That same day reports from the Bureau of Labor Statistics estimated the unemployment rate among African Americans (covering the first two weeks of protests) was up 0.1%, rising to 16.8%.

The U.S. stock market remained unaffected or otherwise increased from the start of the protests on May 26 to June 2. The protest's first two weeks coincided with a 38% rise in the stock market. A resurgence of COVID-19 (facilitated by mass protests) could have exacerbated the 2020 stock market crash according to economists at RBC. The protests disrupted national supply chains over uncertainty regarding public safety, a resurgence of COVID-19, and consumer confidence. Several Fortune 500 retail companies, with large distribution networks, scaled back deliveries and shuttered stores in high-impact areas. Mass demonstrations – of both peaceful and violent varieties – were linked to diminished consumer confidence and demand stemming from the public health risks of group gatherings amid COVID-19.

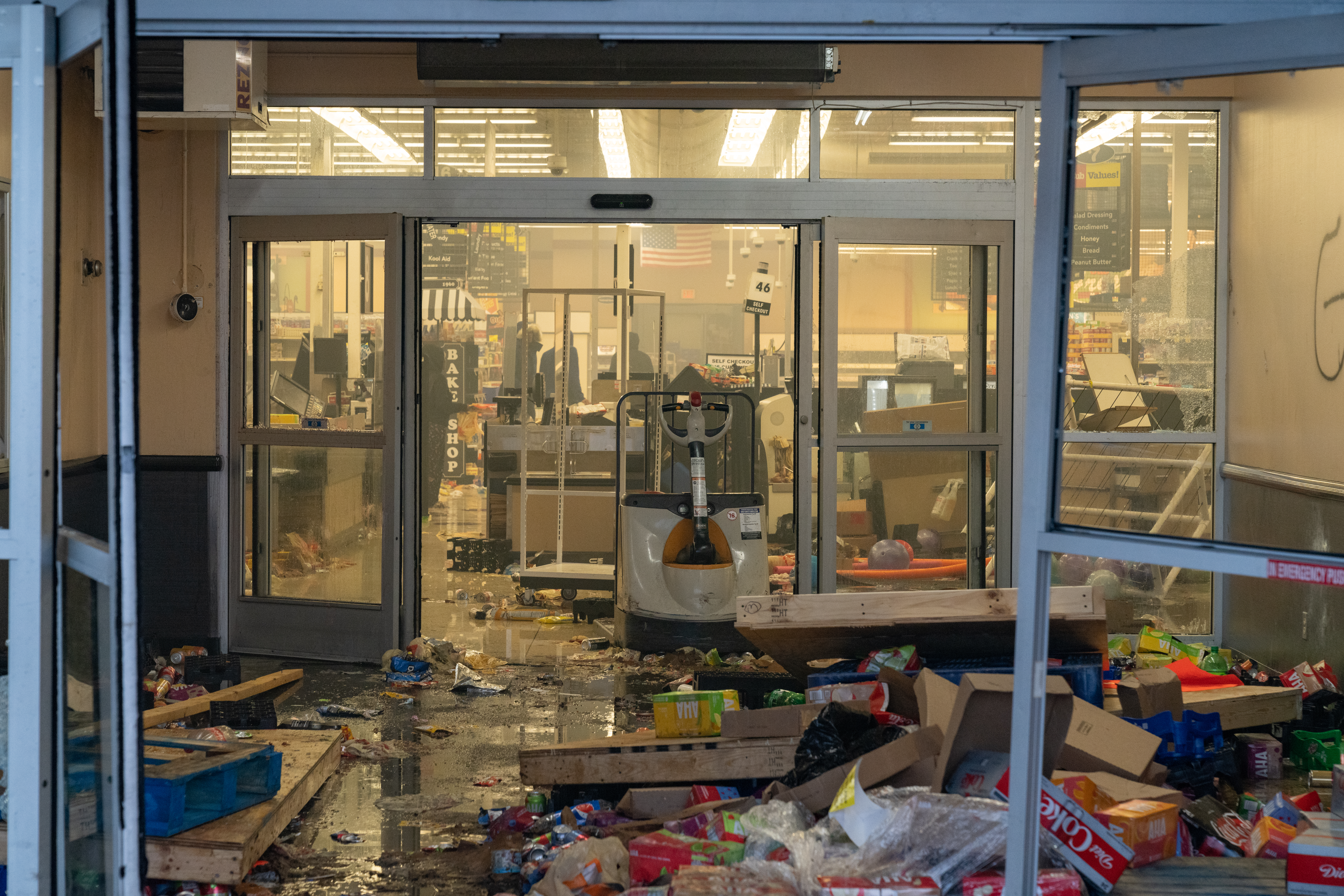
Aftermath of a looted Cub Foods supermarket in Minneapolis, May 28, 2020

Large-scale property damage stemming from the protests has led to increased insurance claims, bankruptcies, and curbed economic activity among small businesses and state governments. Insurance claims arising from property damage suffered in rioting is still being assessed, but is thought to be significant, perhaps record-breaking. Estimates of property damage from fires and looting in the Minneapolis–Saint Paul area were $550 million to 1,500 property locations. Private insurance covered less than half of the estimated damage, which had a disproportionate effect on small business owners, many of who were immigrants and people of color. Among the losses in Minneapolis was Minnehaha Commons, an under-construction, $30 million redevelopment project for 189 units of affordable housing, which was destroyed by fire after being torched on May 27, 2020. A community organization in Atlanta's Buckhead neighborhood said that between $10 million and $15 million in property damage (excluding losses from looting) was incurred over the weekend of May 29–31, mostly along storefronts along Peachtree Street and Phipps Plaza. The damage to downtown Chicago's central business district (near the Magnificent Mile) was reported to have sustained "millions of dollars in damage" according to Fortune.

Public financing and funding, particularly on the state level, has also been impacted by the protests. The COVID-19 recession eroded large parts of state budgets which subsequently struggled to finance the police overtime pay, security costs, and infrastructure repairs related to the demonstrations. State governments have, since June, announced budget cuts to police departments as well as increased funding to other public safety measures. Los Angeles Mayor Eric Garcetti announced on June 5 he will seek up to $150 million in cuts to the Los Angeles Police Department budget.

On May 31, Walmart temporarily closed several hundred of its stores as a precaution. Amazon announced it would redirect some delivery routes and scale back others as a result of the widespread unrest.

=== Monuments and symbols ===
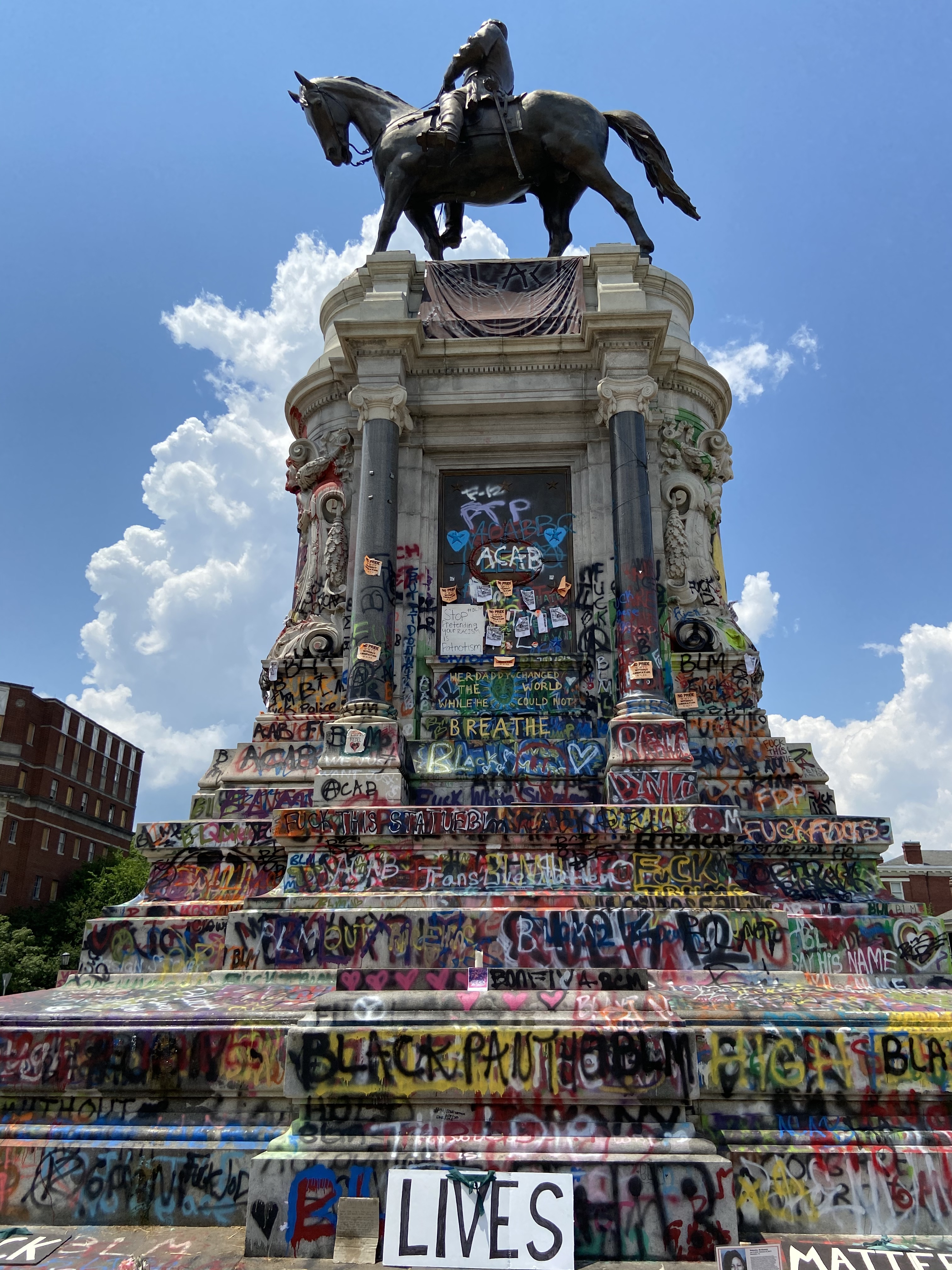
Vandalized monument of Confederate general Robert E. Lee in Richmond, Virginia, on July 1, 2020

A makeshift memorial emerged at the East 38th Street and Chicago Avenue intersection in Minneapolis where Floyd was murdered. Minneapolis officials renamed a stretch two block stretch of Chicago Avenue as George Floyd Perry Jr Place and designated it as one of seven cultural districts in city.

Scrutiny of, discussion of removal, and removal of civic symbols or names relating to the Confederate States of America (frequently associated with segregation and the Jim Crow era in the United States) has regained steam as protests have continued. On June 4, 2020, Virginia governor Ralph Northam announced the Robert E. Lee Monument in Richmond would be removed.

On June 5, making specific reference to events in Charlottesville in 2017, the United States Marine Corps banned the display of the Confederate Battle Flag at their installations. The United States Navy followed suit on June 9 at the direction of Michael M. Gilday, the Chief of Naval Operations.

Birmingham, Alabama, Mayor Randall Woodfin ordered the removal of the Confederate Soldiers and Sailors Monument in Linn Park. The Alabama Attorney General has filed suit against the city of Birmingham for violating the Alabama Memorial Preservation Act.

A statue of America's first president, George Washington, has been torn down and American flag was burned by rioters in Portland, Oregon. Portland Public Schools was responding after protesters pulled down the Thomas Jefferson statue in front of Jefferson High School. Several protesters tore down the statue of the third President of the United States and wrote: "slave owner" and "George Floyd" in spray paint at its white marble base. PPS officials said they recognize that the act is part of a larger and very important national conversation. The statues targeted included a bust of Ulysses S. Grant and statue of Theodore Roosevelt. BLM activist Shaun King tweeted that statues, murals, and stained glass windows depicting a white Jesus should be removed. Protesters defaced a statue of Philadelphia abolitionist Matthias Baldwin with the words "murderer" and "colonizer". Protesters in San Francisco vandalized a statue of Miguel de Cervantes, a Spanish writer who spent five years as a slave in Algiers.

Vandals defaced the statue of Winston Churchill in London's Parliament Square and Queen Victoria's statue in Leeds. The Lincoln Memorial, the World War II Memorial and the statue of General Casimir Pulaski were vandalized during the George Floyd protests in Washington, D.C. On June 7, the statue of Edward Colston was toppled and thrown into Bristol Harbour by demonstrators during the George Floyd protests in the United Kingdom. BLM activists in London are calling for the removal of 60 statues of historical figures like Prime Ministers Charles Grey and William Gladstone, Horatio Nelson, Sir Francis Drake, King Charles II of England, Oliver Cromwell and Christopher Columbus. Protesters in Belgium have vandalized statues of King Leopold II of Belgium.

In Washington, D.C., a statue of Mahatma Gandhi in front of the Indian Embassy was vandalized on the intervening night of June 2 and 3. The incident prompted the embassy to register a complaint with law enforcement agencies. Taranjit Singh Sandhu, the Indian Ambassador to the United States, called the vandalism "a crime against humanity". In London, another statue of Gandhi was vandalized by Black Lives Matter protesters along with the statue of Winston Churchill.

On June 12, the city council in Hamilton, New Zealand removed the statue of Captain John Hamilton, a British officer who was killed during the New Zealand Wars in 1864. A local Māori elder Taitimu Maipi, who had vandalized the statue in 2018, has also called for the city to be renamed Kirikiriroa. New Zealand Deputy Prime Minister Winston Peters called the scrutiny of colonial-era memorials a "wave of idiocy".

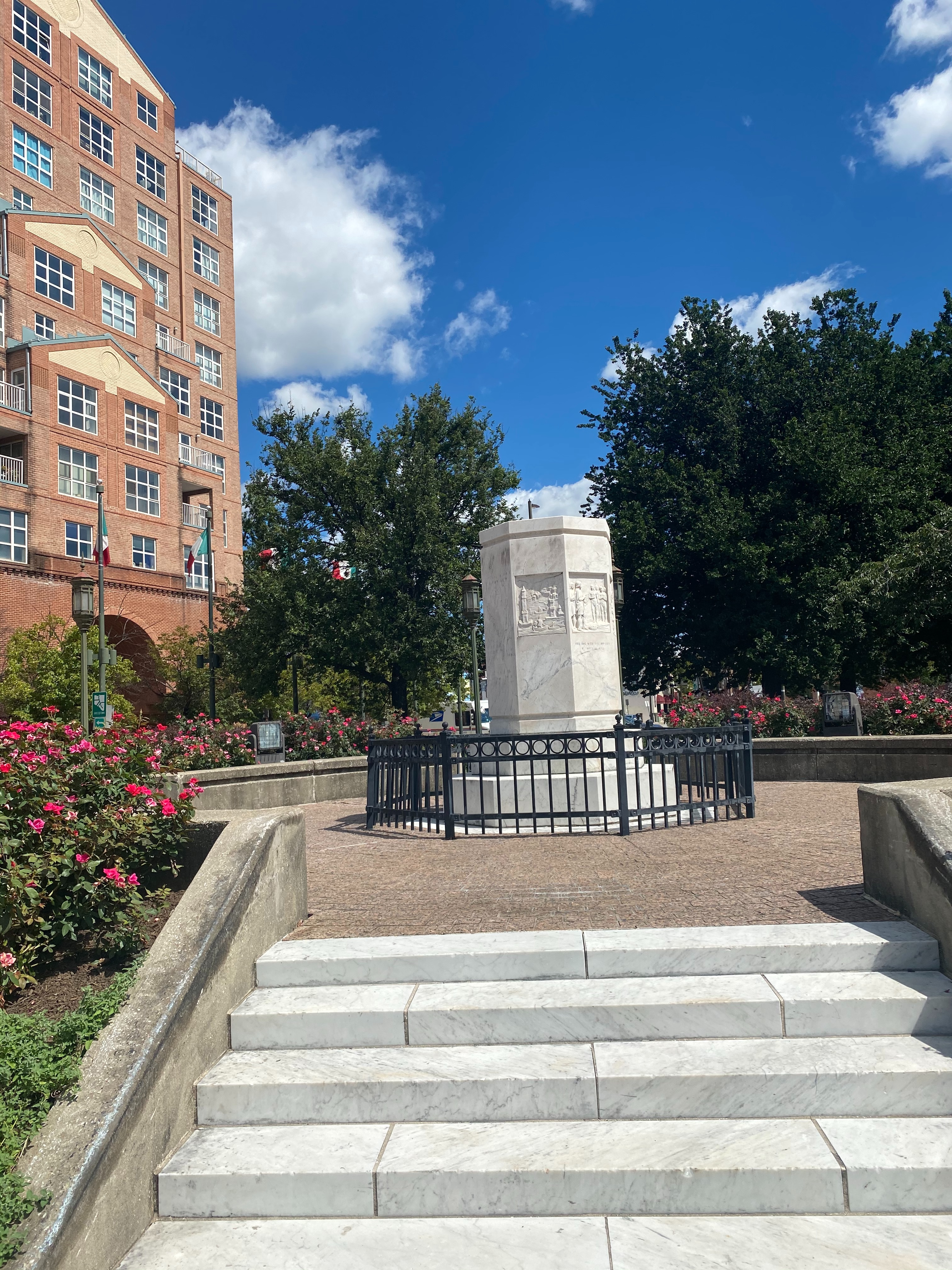
The pedestal of a Christopher Columbus statue that was thrown into the Baltimore inner harbor on July 4, 2020

On June 22, a crowd of rioters unsuccessfully attempted to topple Clark Mills' 1852 bronze equestrian statue of Andrew Jackson in Lafayette Square in President's Park, directly north of the White House in Washington, D.C. Several days later, the United States Department of Justice (DOJ) charged four men with destruction of federal property for allegedly trying to bring down the statue. The Justice Department alleged that a video showed one of the men breaking off and destroying the wheels of the cannons located at the base of the statue as well as pulling on ropes when trying to bring down the statue.

Soon afterwards, the DOJ announced the arrest and charging of a man who was not only allegedly seen on video climbing up onto the Jackson statue and affixing a rope that was then used to try to pull the statue down, but had on June 20 helped destroy Gaetano Trentanove's 1901 Albert Pike Memorial statue near Washington's Judiciary Square by pulling it from its base and setting it on fire. The DOJ's complaint alleged that the man had been captured on video dousing the federally-owned Pike statue with a flammable liquid, igniting it as it lay on the ground and using the fire to light a cigarette.

On June 30, after the Mississippi Legislature obtained a two-thirds majority in both houses to suspend rules in order to pass a bill addressing the Confederate Battle Flag on the Mississippi state flag, Governor Tate Reeves signed a bill that relinquished the state flag, mandated its removal from public premises within 15 days, and established a commission to propose a new flag design that excluded the Confederate Battle Flag and included the motto "In God We Trust". The flag contained the Confederate symbol in the canton (upper left corner) of the flag, and was the last U.S. state flag to do so.

During a speech on July 3 at Mount Rushmore, U.S. president Donald Trump denounced the monument removals as part of a "left wing cultural revolution" to "overthrow the American Revolution".

On July 13, the Washington Redskins announced that their name and logo would be retired upon completion of "a thorough review of the name" that was first announced on July 3.

A week-long tour began July 28 in which a hologram of Floyd was projected on a monument to be removed, thereby "replacing" the monument with Floyd. Richmond, Virginia, was the first stop.

In the response to the protests, Congress mandated the creation of a Commission on the Naming of Items of the Department of Defense that Commemorate the Confederate States of America or Any Person Who Served Voluntarily with the Confederate States of America in the National Defense Authorization Act for Fiscal Year 2021. President Trump cited this provision in his veto of the NDAA, resulting in the only veto override of his presidency.

=== Impact on police activity ===
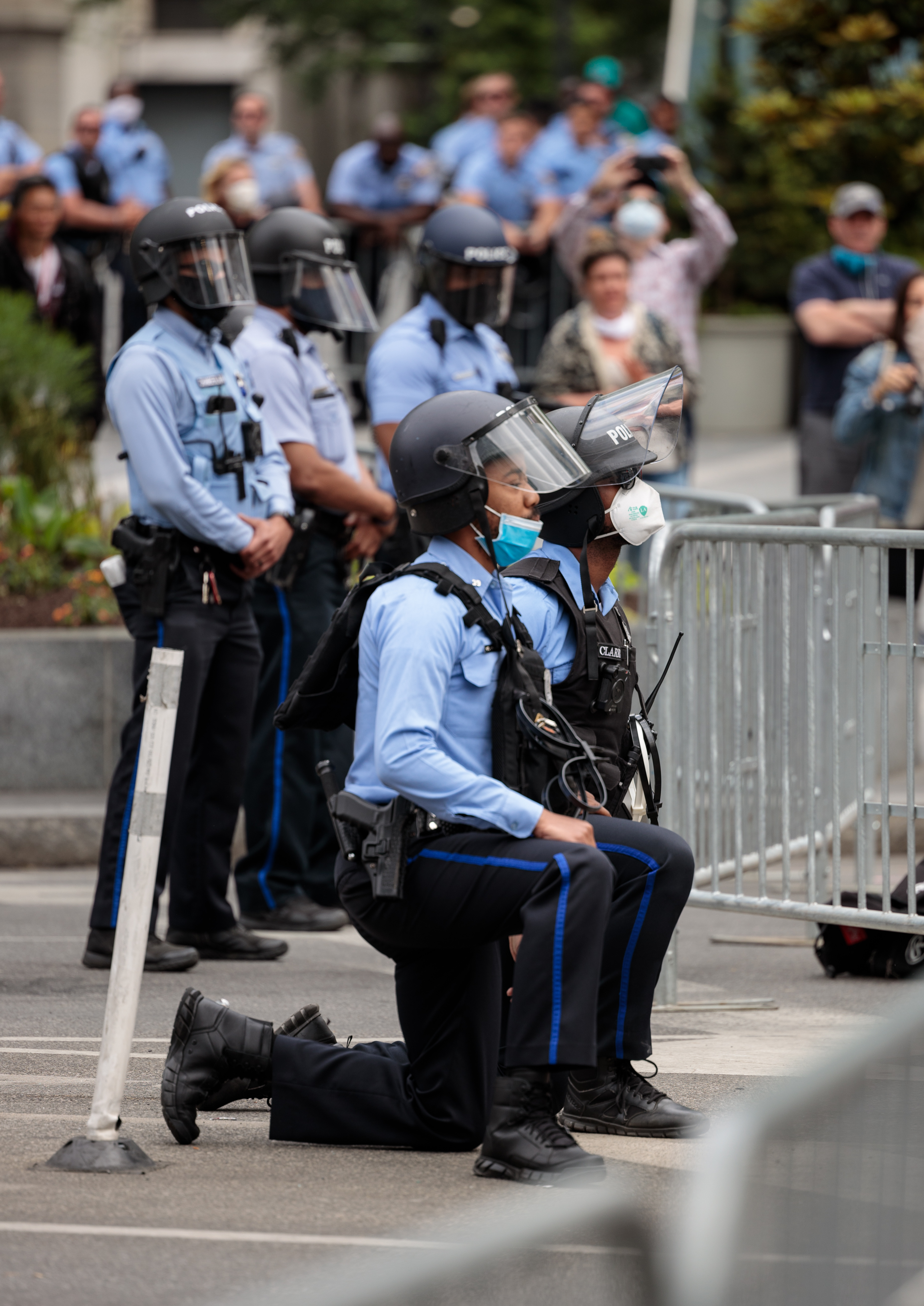
Police take a knee during protests in Philadelphia on June 2, 2020

According to Lt. Bob Kroll, the head of the Minneapolis police union, officers began retiring "en masse" alongside morale being at an "all-time low".

Around 170 Atlanta police officers walked off of the job in mid-June following unresolved grievances in the Rayshard Brooks case.

The New York City Police Department reported a 411% increase in police retirement application in the first week of July. As a result, the department has limited new retirement applications to 40 a day.

On July 11, at least 150 Minneapolis police officers reported nondescript injuries as well as symptoms of post-traumatic stress disorder, leading over half of them to leave their jobs with more likely to follow. The Minneapolis police have denied there being any serious injuries inflicted on officers.

==== Changes to police policies ====
In the wake of Floyd's murder, state and local governments evaluated their police department policies, and the response to protests, for themselves. For example, California Governor Gavin Newsom called for new police crowd control procedures for the state, and the banning of the police use of carotid chokeholds, which starve the brain of oxygen. The Minneapolis police department banned police from using chokeholds; Denver's police department also banned the use of chokeholds without exception, and also established new reporting requirements whenever a police officer holds a person at gunpoint.

In June 2020, Democrats in Congress introduced the George Floyd Justice in Policing Act of 2020, a police reform and accountability bill that contains measures to combat police misconduct, excessive force, and racial bias in policing. The impetus for the bill were the murder of Floyd and the killings of Breonna Taylor and other African Americans at the hands of police. It passed the House of Representatives one month after Floyd's murder, 236 to 181, with support from Democrats and three Republicans. A Republican reform bill was blocked in the U.S. Senate by all but two Democrats; neither party negotiated the contents of the bill with the other. Speaker Nancy Pelosi summarized Democratic opposition to the Senate bill: "it's not a question that it didn't go far enough; it didn't go anywhere".

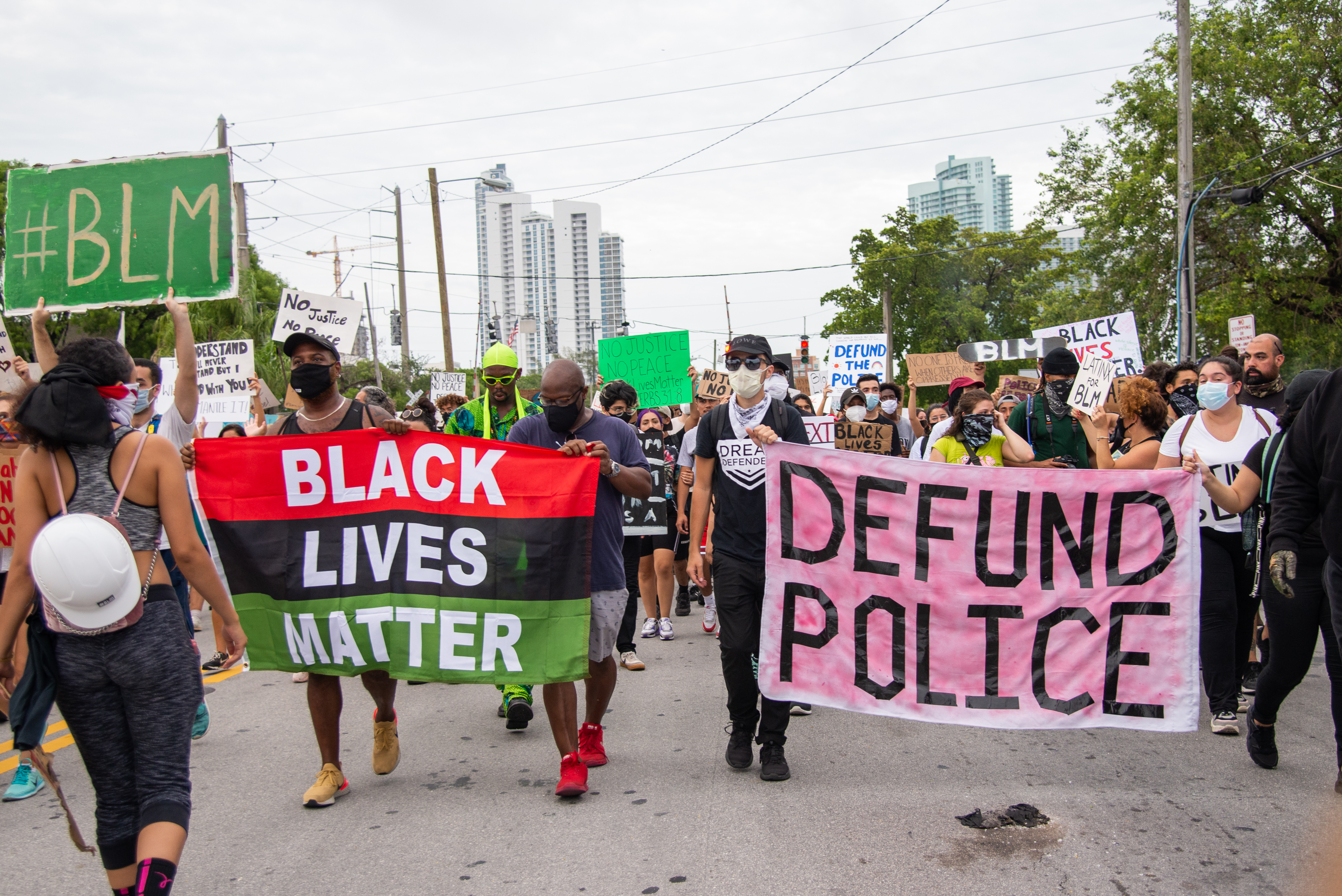
"Defund the Police", a phrase popularized by BLM during the George Floyd protests

On June 16, President Trump signed an executive order on police reform that incentivized departments to recruit from communities they patrol, encourage more limited use of deadly force, and prioritize using social workers and mental health professionals for nonviolent calls. The order also created a national database of police officers with a history of using excessive force.

On September 10, Ted Wheeler, the mayor and police commissioner of Portland, Oregon, banned city police from using tear gas for riot control purposes, but reiterated that police would respond to violent protests forcefully. Portland had seen over one hundred consecutive days of protests since they began on May 28.

==== Push to abolish police ====
Nine members of the Minneapolis City Council – a veto-proof majority – pledged on June 7 to dismantle the Minneapolis Police Department, despite opposition from Mayor Jacob Frey. U.S. representative Ilhan Omar stated, "the Minneapolis Police Department has proven themselves beyond reform. It's time to disband them and reimagine public safety in Minneapolis." Despite pledges by city council members to the end the Minneapolis Police Department, a proposed amendment to the Minneapolis city charter which was approved by the Minneapolis City Council on June 26 would only rename the police department and change its structure if approved by voters. In August, the review of another proposal to dismantle the department was delayed by 90 days, meaning it wouldn't be voted on in the November ballot because it passed the statutory deadline of August 21. The budget for the department was passed in December and the funding was reduced by $7.7 million.

=== Impact on television and films ===
In the media industry, the protests have spurred scrutiny for cop shows and led to the cancellation of popular television shows referred to by critics as copaganda. With long-standing criticism that it presented an unbalanced view of law enforcement in favor of police, encouraged police to engage in more dramatic behavior for the camera, and degraded suspects who had not yet been convicted of any crime, the Paramount Network canceled the 33rd season of the TV show Cops and pulled it from broadcast. The television network A&E canceled a similar show, Live PD, which was also found to have destroyed footage documenting the police killing of Javier Ambler in Austin, Texas, in 2019. The streaming service HBO Max temporarily pulled the film Gone with the Wind until video that explains and condemns the film's racist depictions could be produced to accompany it. In the United Kingdom, the BBC pulled the famed "The Germans" episode of Fawlty Towers from its UKTV streaming service, but later reinstated it after criticism from series star and co-writer John Cleese. He later criticized their use of the word "fury" to describe his comments. This was later removed by the BBC. The episode, which included racial slurs about the West Indies cricket team, now features a disclaimer at the beginning warning of "offensive content and language". The BBC also removed the Little Britain series and its spinoff Come Fly with Me from the iPlayer and BritBox services as well as Netflix for its use of blackface.

The week of June 24, 2020, several animated series that had black, mixed or non-white characters voiced by white actors, including Big Mouth, Central Park, Family Guy and The Simpsons, announced those characters would be recast with people of color. That same week, episodes of 30 Rock, The Office, It's Always Sunny in Philadelphia, Community, The Golden Girls, and Peep Show that involved characters using blackface were either removed or edited from syndication and streaming services.

In light of the protests, Brooklyn Nine-Nine co-star Terry Crews said that the first four episodes of the show's eighth season had to be rewritten.

The Penny Dreadful: City of Angels episode "Sing, Sing, Sing", opens with an additional viewer discretion warning about its content, specifically the lynching of a character by members of the Los Angeles Police Department. The episode originally aired less than one month after Floyd's murder, and was the only episode to feature this additional warning.

=== Impact on brand marketing ===
In reaction to the higher sensitivity by customers for racial issues in the aftermath of Floyd's murder, multiple companies decided to rebrand some products. The brands Aunt Jemima, Uncle Ben's, and Fair & Lovely made adaptations to eliminate racial stereotypes. In sports, the NFL football team in Washington, D.C., dropped the "Redskins" nickname and the MLB baseball team in Cleveland said it would discontinue the "Indians" nickname after the 2021 season and adopt the "Guardians" nickname. In June 2020, Disney announced that their theme park attraction Splash Mountain, which had been themed to the 1946 film Song of the South, controversial for its depiction of African Americans, would be re-themed based on the 2009 film The Princess and the Frog, which had Disney's first depiction of a black princess.

=== Public art ===
Artistic impressions of George Floyd's likeness became an icon of the protest movement that unfolded following his murder. Paintings of Floyd appeared on exterior walls in many cities in the United States and around the world. A mapping project of protest art after Floyd's murder had by May 19, 2021, documented 2,100 entries of George Floyd-related and anti-racism art around the world, though much of it was from the Minneapolis and Saint Paul area. Many works appeared on plywood that covered up boarded-up windows and doors as result of unrest.

=== COVID-19 pandemic ===
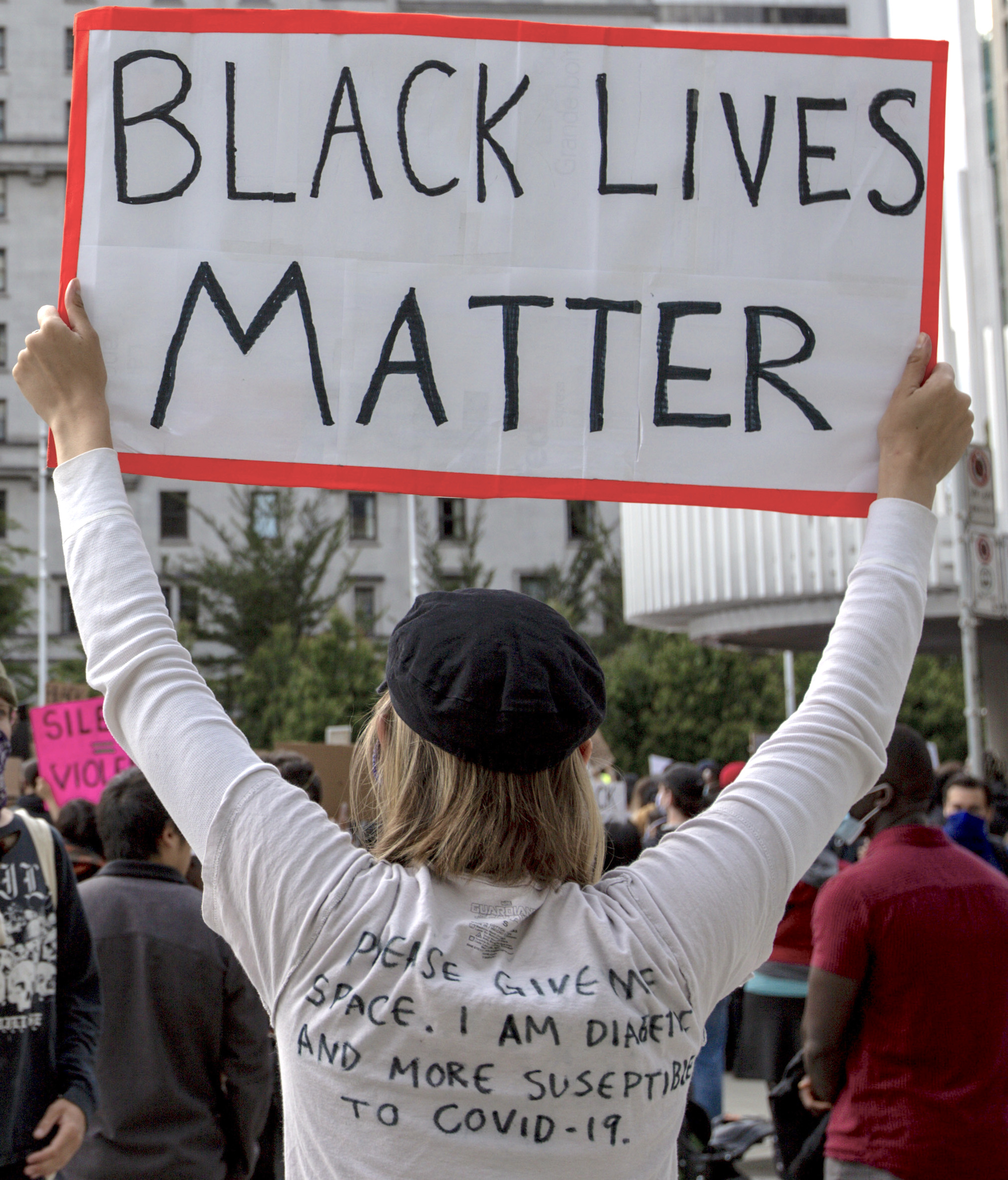
A protester in Vancouver, Canada, mentioning COVID-19 on their clothing

The protests occurred during the early, pre-vaccination phase of the global COVID-19 pandemic, which led officials and experts to express concerns that the demonstrations could lead to further spread of SARS-CoV-2. The demonstrations thus sparked debate among commentators, political leaders, and health experts over coronavirus restrictions on gatherings. In June 2020 the CDC released the "Considerations for Events and Gatherings" which assesses large gatherings where it is difficult for people to stay at least six feet apart, and where attendees travel from outside the local area as "highest risk". Public health experts and mayors urged demonstrators to wear face coverings, follow physical separation (social distancing) practices, engage in proper hand hygiene, and seek out COVID-19 testing.

Subsequent studies and public health reports showed that the protests in 2020 did not drive an increase in COVID-19 transmission. Epidemiologists and other researchers attributed this to the location of the demonstrations outdoors (where the virus is less likely to spread as compared to indoors); because many protesters wore masks; and because persons who demonstrated made up a small portion of the overall U.S. population (about 6% of adults). Outdoor events were analyzed to have a substantially lower risk of spreading the virus than indoor ones, and transient contact was considered less risky than extended close contact.

Some protesters that were arrested were detained in crowded, indoor environments and did not have protective masks, which prompted concern over potential jail-spread of SARS-CoV-2. Some law enforcement personnel in New York City who responded to protests were criticized for failing to wear face masks. An outbreak was detected among Houston, Texas, police department officers, but it was not clear if the officers were exposed on or off of their police duty.

While many U.S. states experienced growth in new cases during the initial wave of protests, these upticks are thought to be attributed to reopenings of workplaces, bars, restaurants, and other businesses.

== Gallery ==
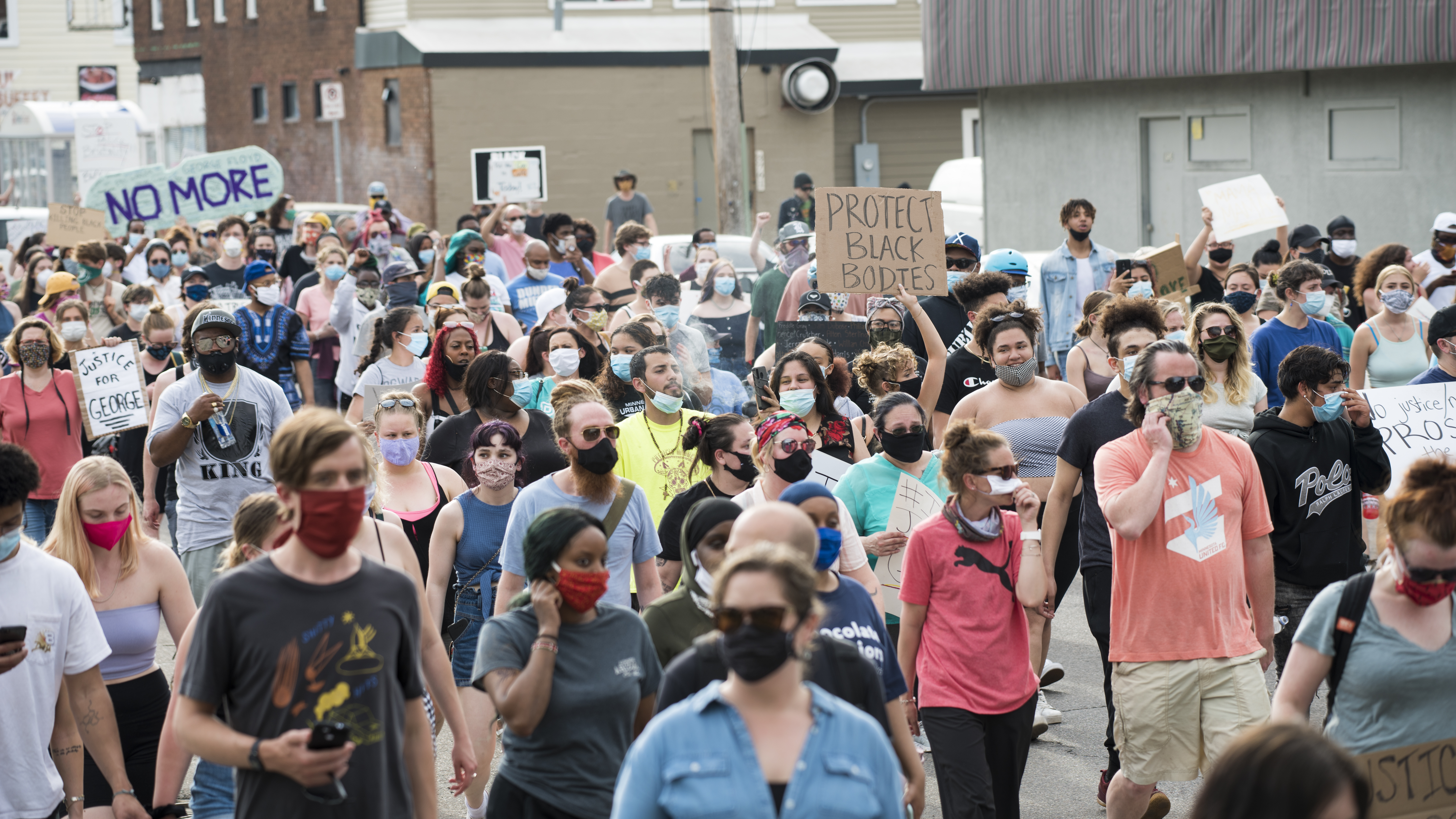
A protest march in Minneapolis on May 26, 2020

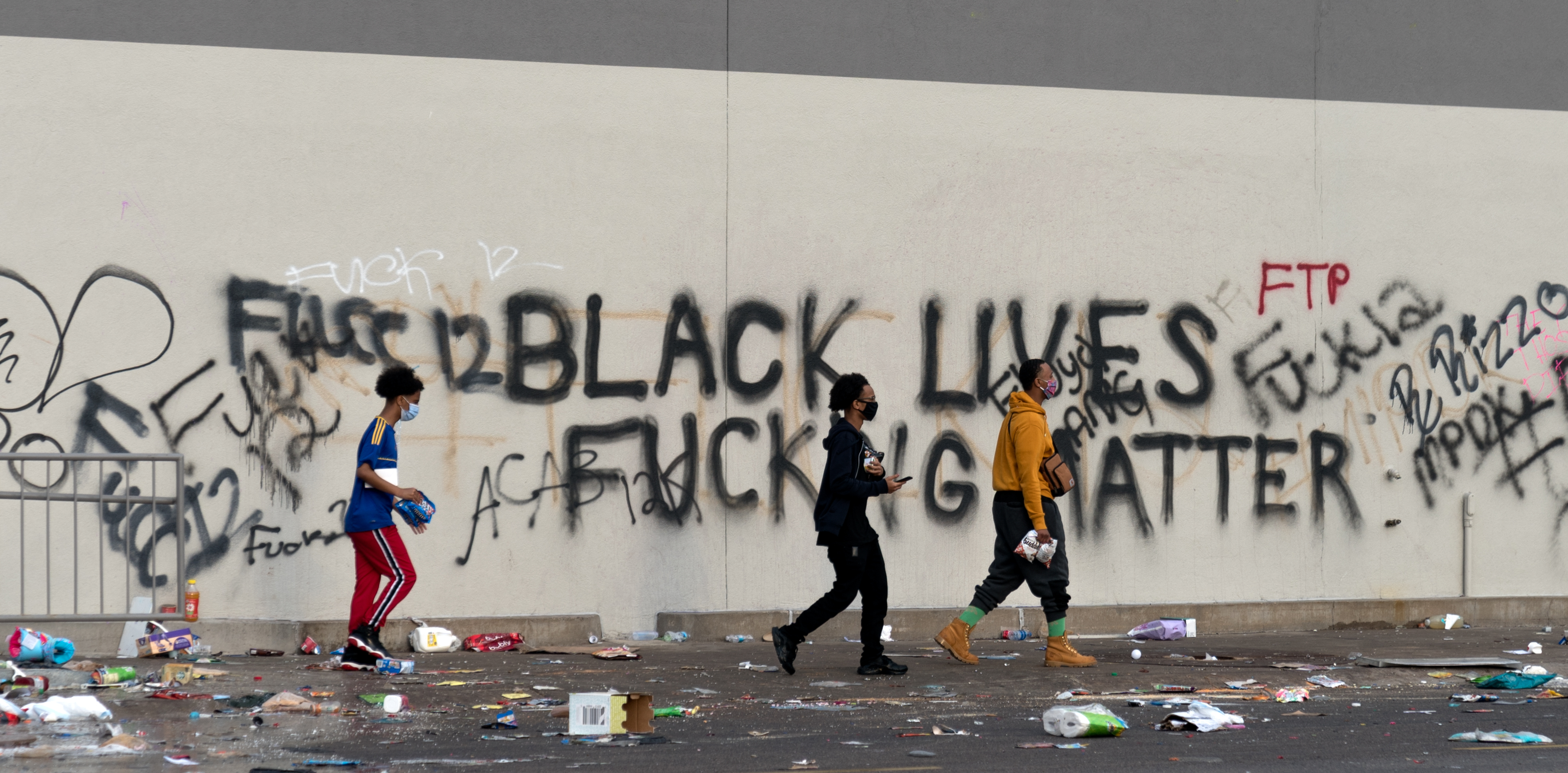
"Black Lives Fucking Matter", "A.C.A.B.", and "Fuck 12" graffiti on a looted Target store on Lake Street, Minneapolis the morning of May 28, 2020

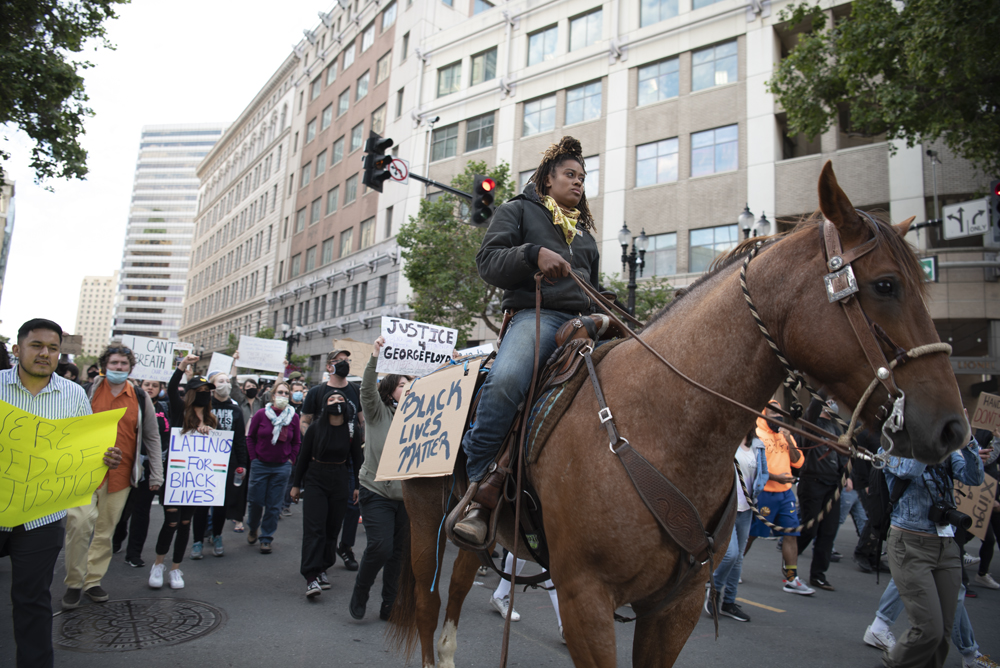
Protesters in Oakland, California, on May 29, 2020

Police confront protesters near Trump Tower in Chicago on May 30, 2020

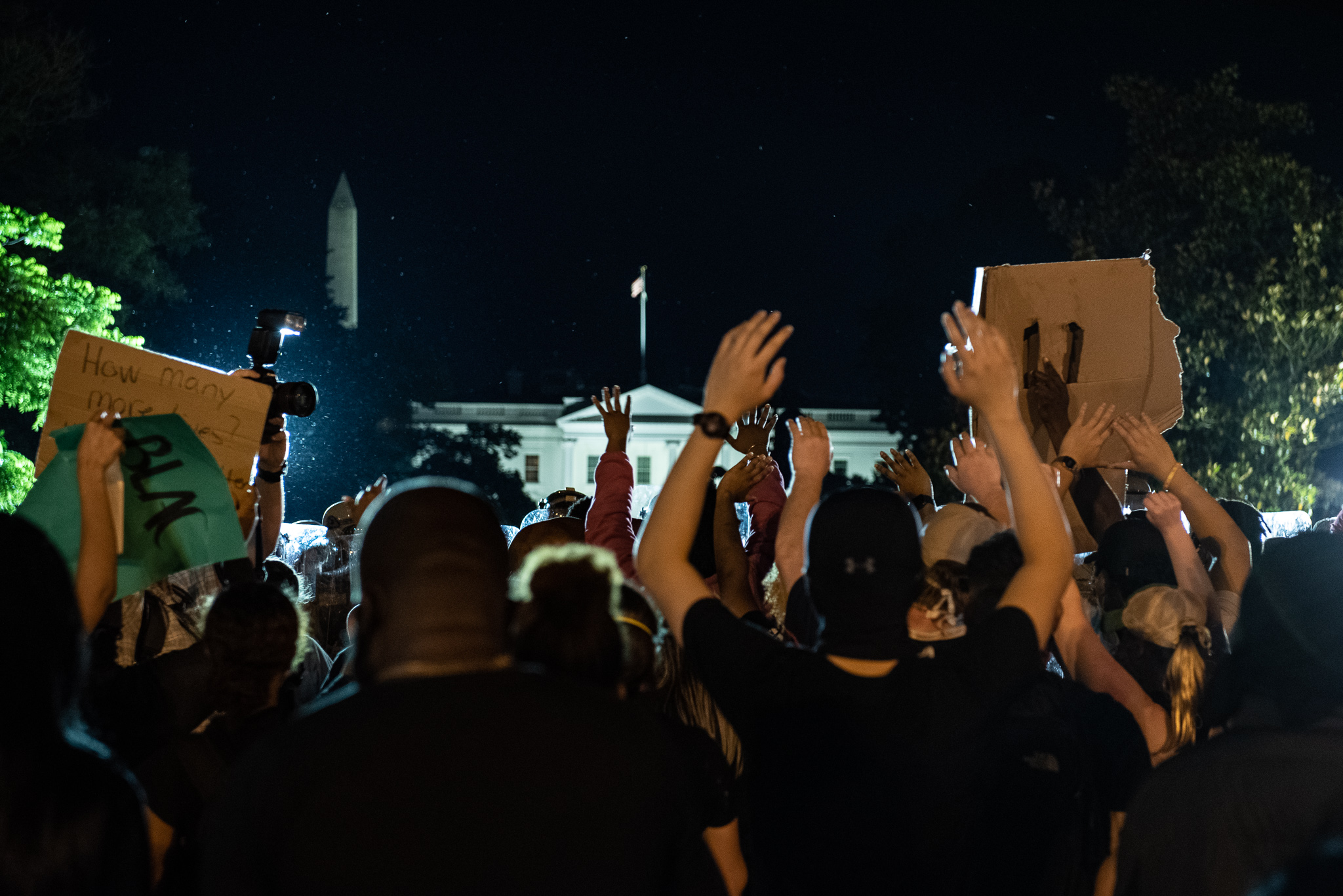
Protesters in Washington, D.C., in front of the White House on May 30, 2020

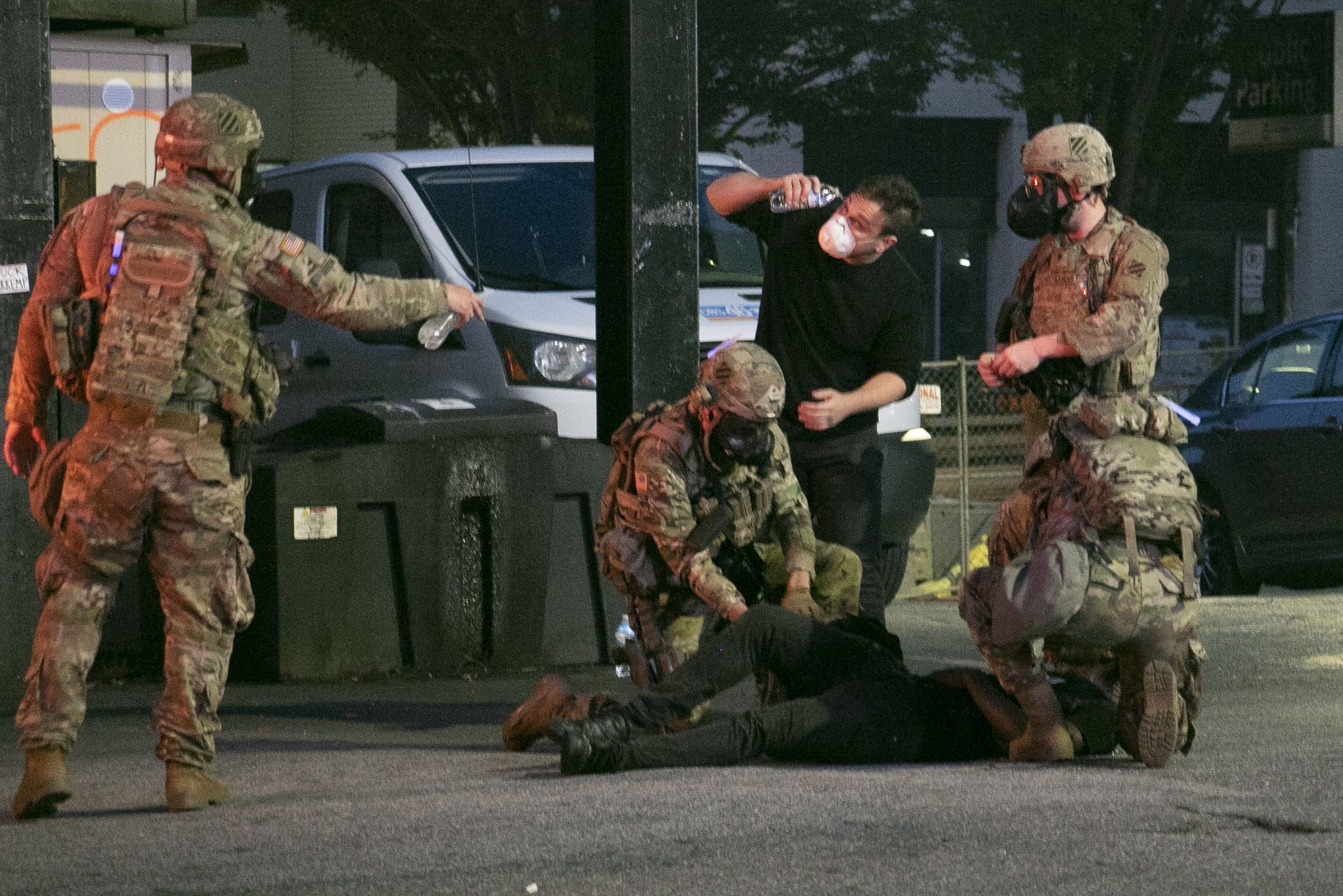
Georgia National Guard medics treat a protester injured by tear gas on June 2, 2020

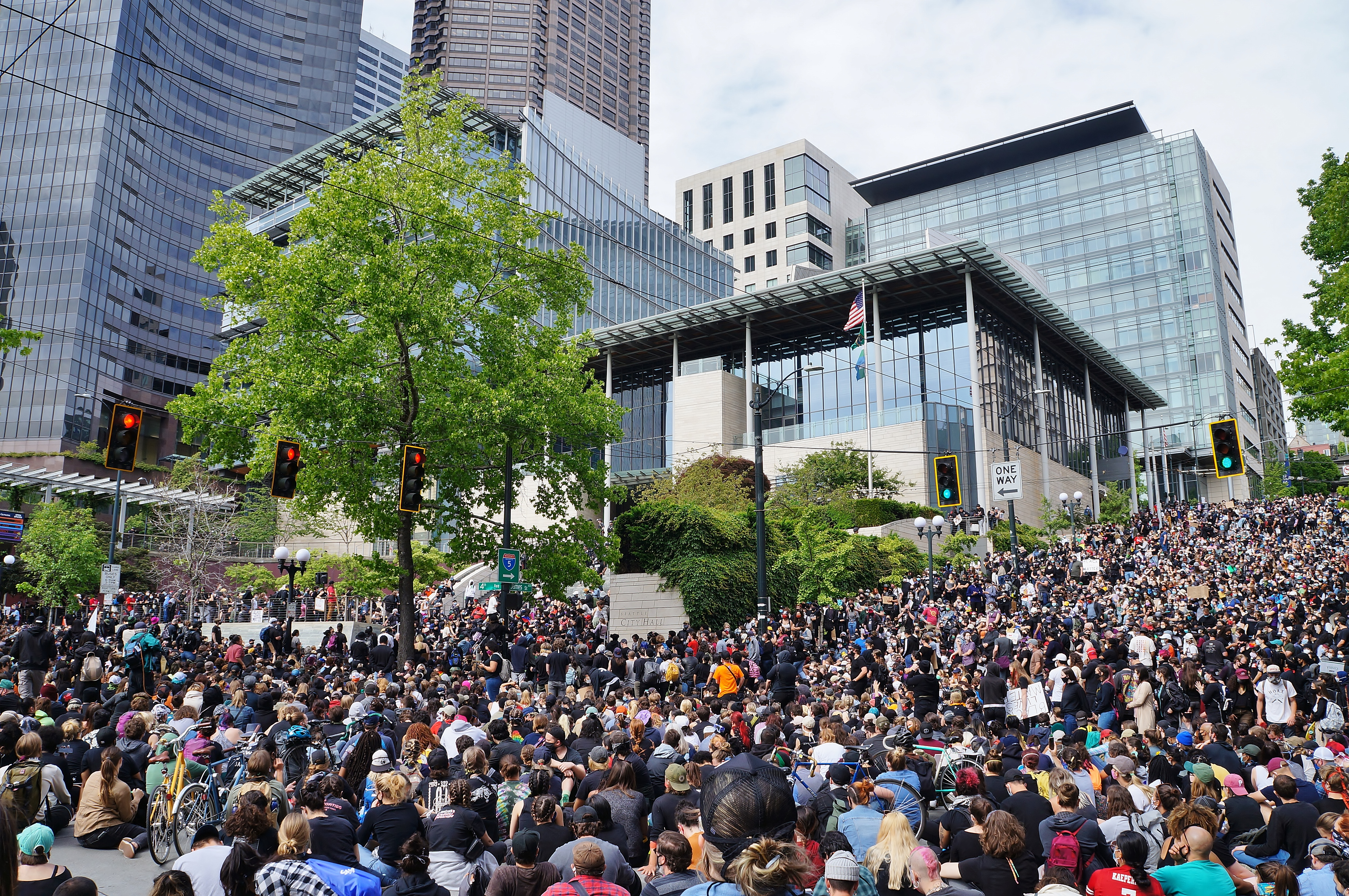
Protesters in Seattle on June 3, 2020

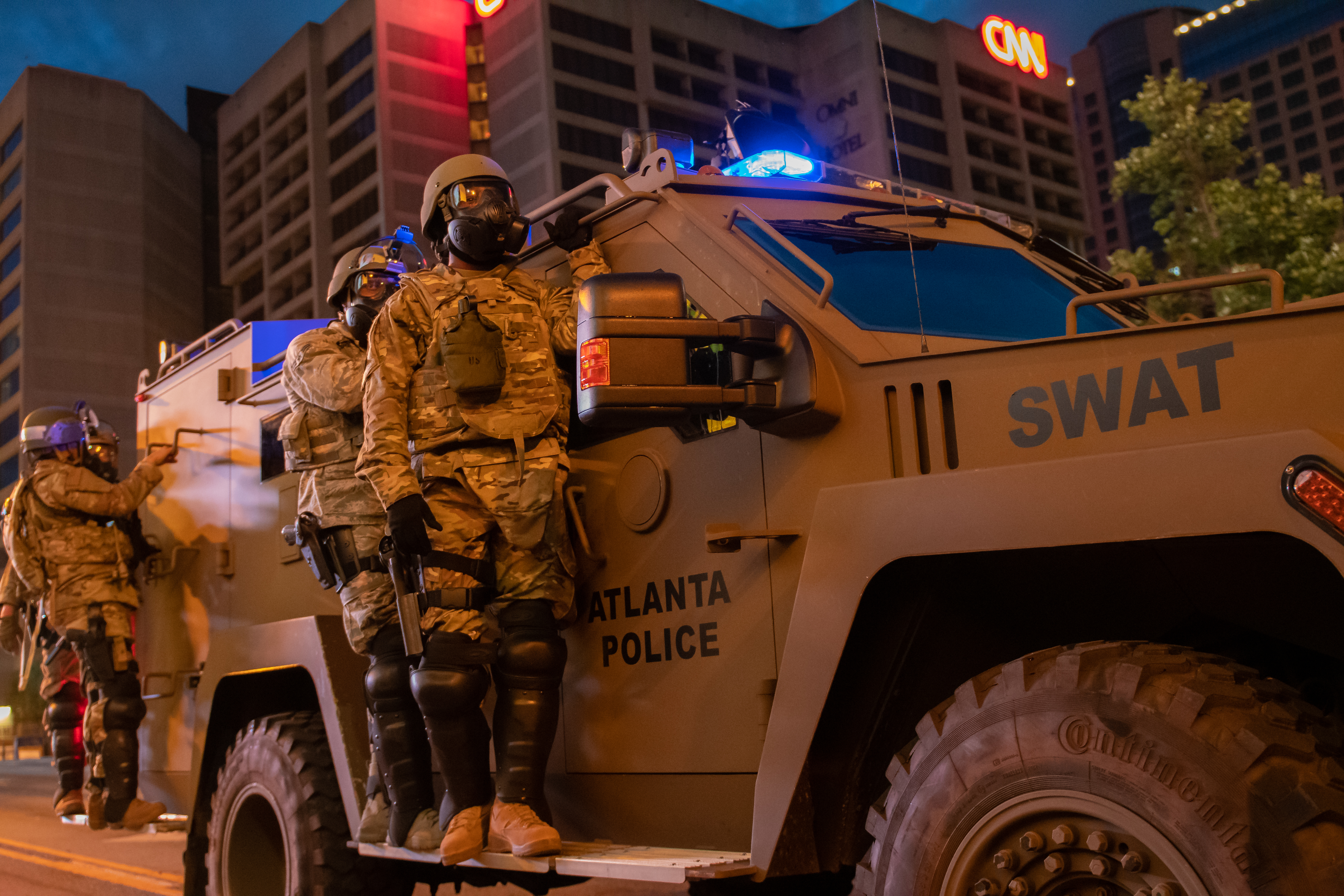
National Guard in Atlanta on June 4, 2020

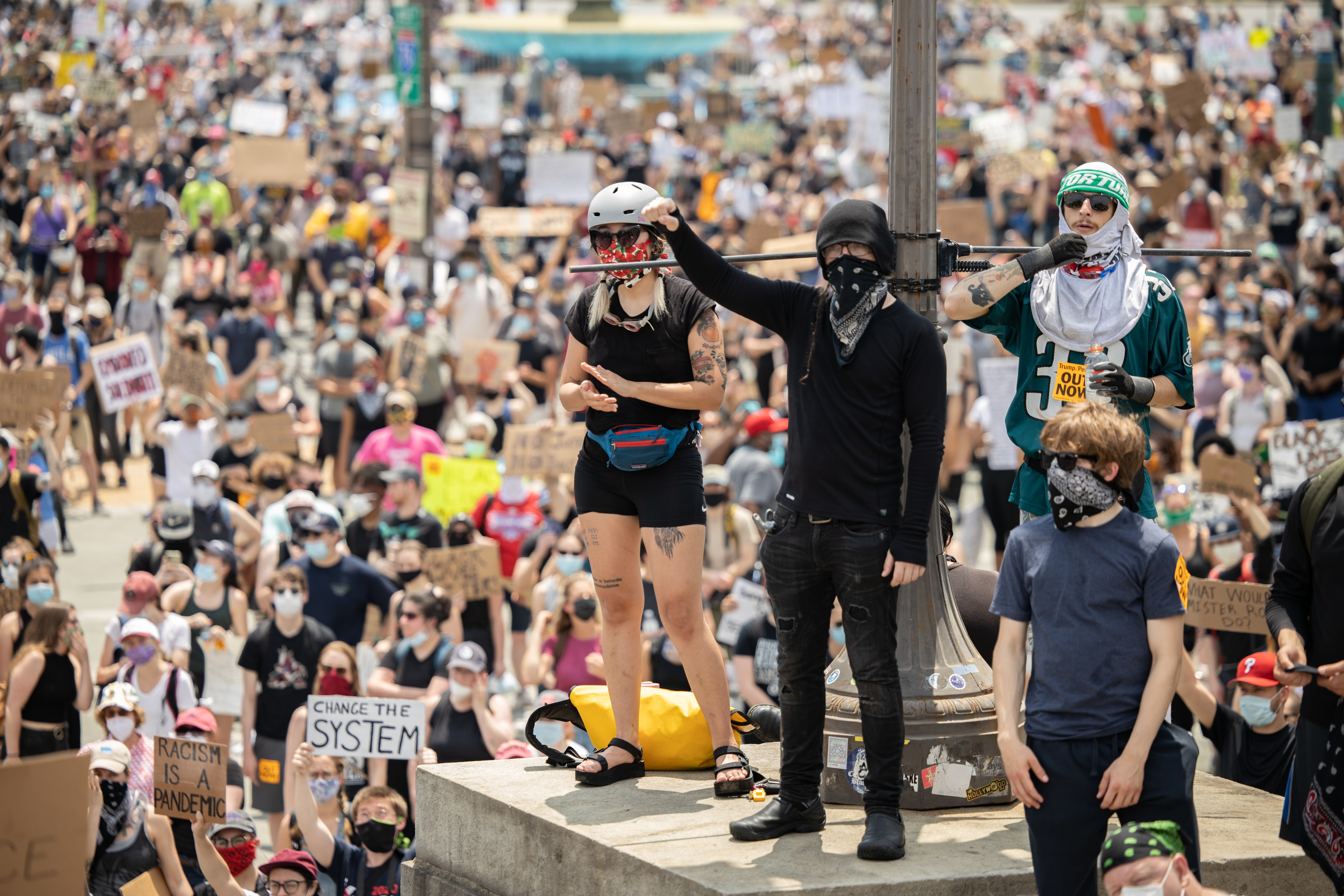
Protesters in Philadelphia on June 6, 2020

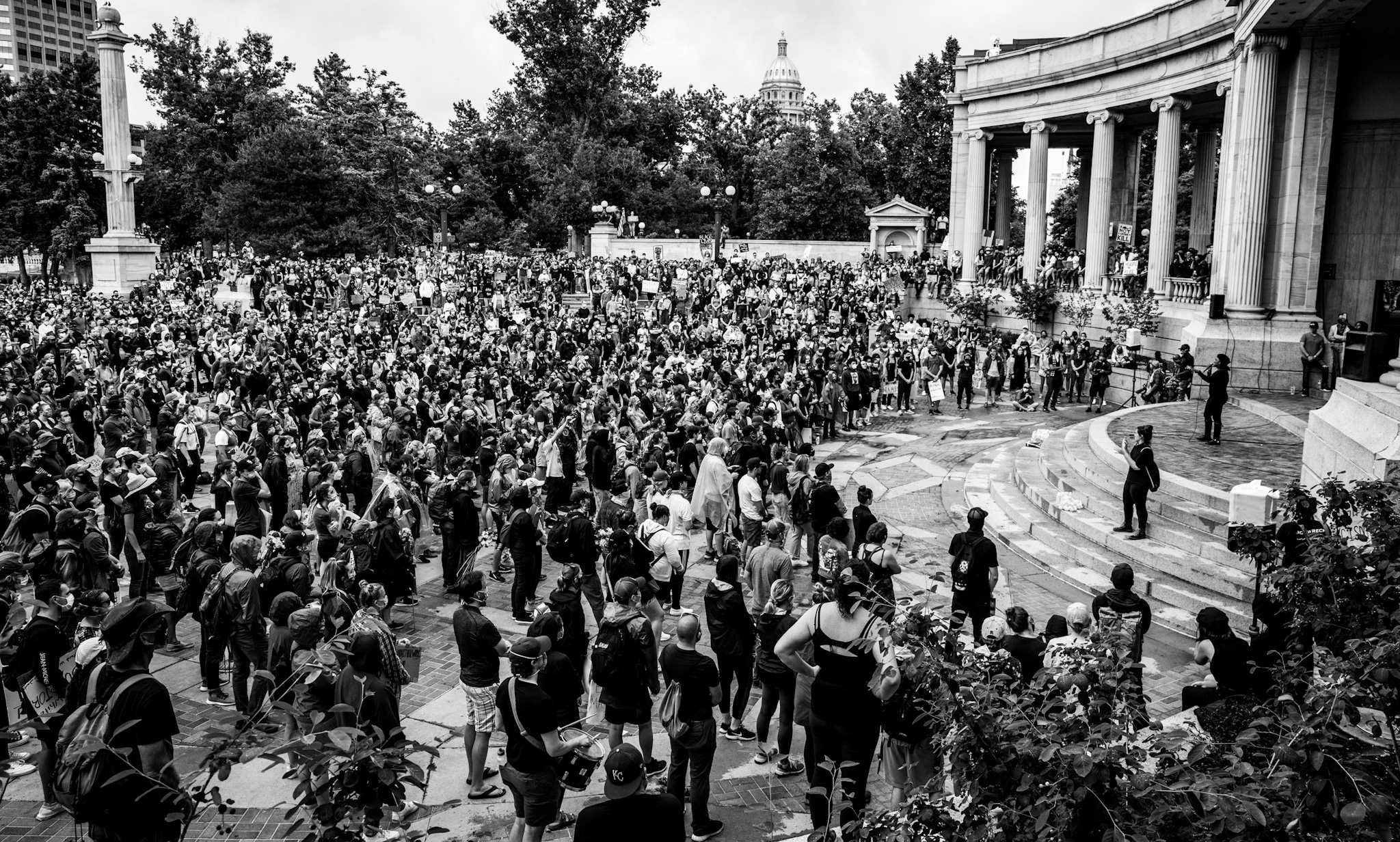
Protesters in Denver on June 6, 2020

== See also ==
- Lists of George Floyd protests
- Long, hot summer of 1967 – Protests and riots in which the statement "When the looting starts, the shooting starts" was first coined by Miami police chief Walter E. Headley
- Eddington – 2025 film largely focused on the cultural impact of the George Floyd protests
- King assassination riots – Several protests and riots following the 1968 assassination of Martin Luther King Jr.
- 1968 Democratic National Convention protests – Protests against the Vietnam War that were later described as a "police riot"
- 1980 Miami riots – Protests after an unarmed black salesman was beaten to death by police officers in 1979 and the officers involved were acquitted in May 1980
- 2014 Ferguson unrest – The large-scale unrest after the fatal shooting of Michael Brown by police
- 2020 Kenosha protests – Protests after the shooting of Jacob Blake in Kenosha, Wisconsin
- 2021 Daunte Wright protests – Protests after the killing of Daunte Wright
- Protest paradigm – Propagandistic news coverage patterns that delegitimize or inaccurately frame the protests
- Outside agitator – Disparaging term used to discount political unrest
