= 38th Street (Minneapolis) =

Street in Minneapolis

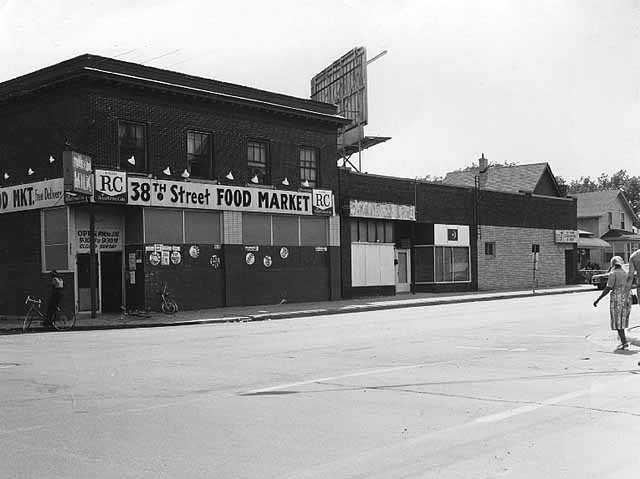
- A food market at East 38th Street and 4th Avenue South in Minneapolis, 1975
- Owner: City of Minneapolis
- Location: Minneapolis, Minnesota, United States
- Nearest metro station: Blue Line; 38th Street station
- Coordinates: 44.9342°N 93.2625°W
- Major junctions: I-35W, Exit 14
- East: East 38th Street
- West: West 38th Street

Other
- Known for: Historic Black district; Murder of George Floyd; 38th Street Cultural District
- Website: minneapolismn.gov

38th Street is a major east-west roadway in the U.S. city of Minneapolis and an officially designated cultural district in the Powderhorn community. The area developed into a residential zone when the Chicago Avenue street car line was extended to East 38th Street in 1880. Since the 1930s, the area has featured many Black-owned businesses, and the surrounding neighborhoods have had distinct histories from other neighborhoods in Minneapolis due to racial settlement patterns that concentrated Black residents there.

After several decades of economic stagnation, the historic character of the 38th Street neighborhood changed in the 2000s with an influx of Latino residents, as the Black and White populations declined. In the 2010s, concerns about gentrification resulted in residents and city leaders seeking to preserve the historic cultural characteristics of the 38th Street corridor. In 2020, the murder of George Floyd took place outside the Cup Foods grocery store, which brought worldwide recognition of the 38th and Chicago street intersection.

== Geography ==
In Minneapolis, 38th Street is an east-west thorough fare. West 38th Street runs from Excelsior Boulevard to Nicollet Avenue, but is interrupted by Bde Mka Ska and Lakewood Cemetery. East 38th Street is the stretch of road from Nicollet Avenue to the West River Parkway of the Mississippi River. East 38th Street intersects with Chicago Avenue, a major north-south thoroughfare, in the city's Powderhorn community. The 38th and Chicago street intersection is a border for several city neighborhoods: Bancroft, Bryant, Central, and Powderhorn Park. The four neighborhoods have a distinct history in Minneapolis due to the racial and ethnic residential population and development matters over the past century. The neighborhoods were home to approximately 25,000 residents by the 2020s.

== History ==
=== Annexation into Minneapolis ===
After the area was platted in the mid 1800s, 38th Street was a part of Richfield in Hennepin County. In 1867, the Minnesota Legislature created the Minneapolis Township, a separate jurisdiction from the City of Minneapolis, out of the area south of Lake Street to the northern bank of Minnehaha Creek (then named Brown's Creek). In 1883, the Powderhorn area was transferred from Minneapolis Township to the City of Minneapolis, and 38th Street became the city's southern boundary. The city annexed remaining portions of the township in 1887.

=== Transit connection and residential growth ===
Residential development of the 38th Street area began in the 1870s, but was hindered by the lack of public transit to connect people to the city's downtown area. In 1880, trolley lines on Chicago Avenue were extended to 38th Street, connecting passengers to downtown. In 1926, a 38th Street bus line that ran east-west was added, and later extended a few years later. The area grew into a bustling commercial intersection and neighborhood, linked by the Chicago Avenue trolley line.

Residential neighborhoods along 38th Street were first populated by Swedes and Norwegians. By the 1920s, the area was multi-cultural with a mixed population of African American, Jewish, and Southern and Eastern European people. Many Black residents had moved to the south Minneapolis area along 38th Street as part of the Great Migration, the northern movement of Blacks from rural southern states in the early 20th century.

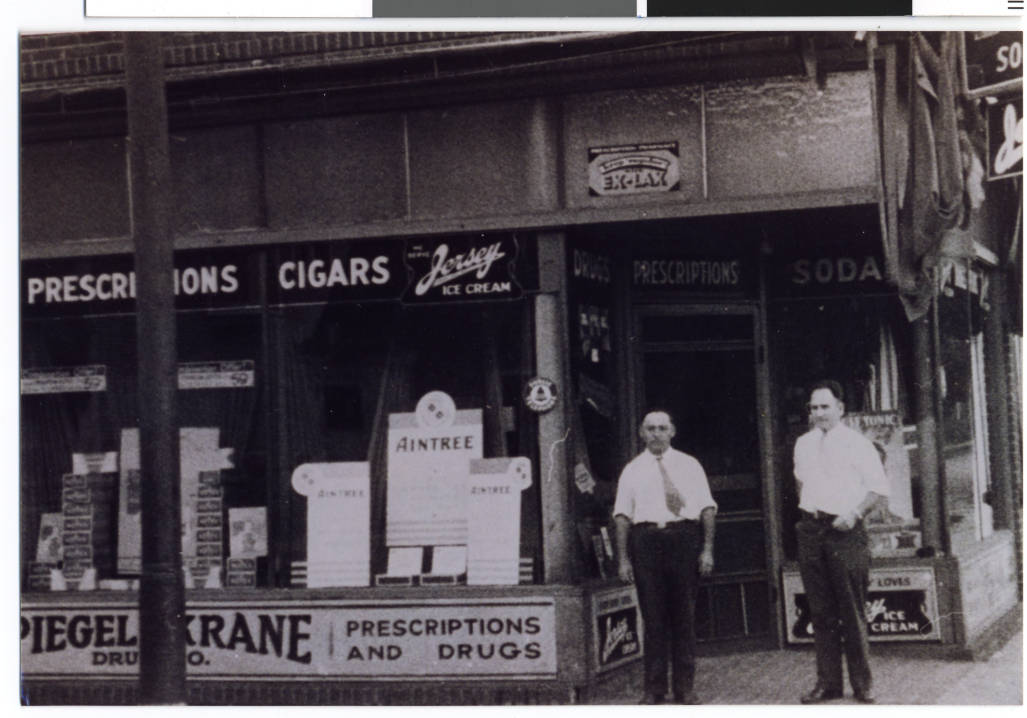
Spiegel Krane Drugs store at 4th Avenue and East 38th Street, July 13, 1932

=== Black residential and business district ===
From the 1930s to the 1970s, the neighborhoods along East 38th Street in Minneapolis were the center of a thriving Black residential and business district in the city's south side, with many Black residents living in the area from East 34th to 46th streets south and from Nicollet to Chicago avenues. In the 1900s, discriminatory housing practices in parts of the city, such as racial covenants that barred property from being transferred from White home owners to prospective Black home owners, as well as the practice of redlining, had the effect of concentrating Black residents there and racial discrimination by businesses in the city's predominately White areas resulted in development and growth of Black commerce. The 38th Street corridor became a destination for both Black residents and Black visitors to Minneapolis who sought businesses who would serve them. East 38th Street and 4th Avenue South featured a Black-owned café, delicatessen, newspaper headquarters, and shops.

=== Spokesman-Recorder ===
Founded in 1934 by Cecil Newman, the Minnesota Spokesman-Recorder is the oldest continuously operated Black newspaper in the state. It has been located near the intersection of East 38th Street and Fourth Avenue South since 1958. Its building was designated as a historic landmark in 2015.

=== Economic and social decline ===
The historic Black business district was affected by construction of Interstate 35W highway in Minneapolis in 1959, which razed fifty square blocks and created a large gulf that cut across 38th Street and split the broader neighborhood in half. The character of the neighborhood also changed as the population declined and the nearby Central High School closed in 1982. From the 1980s to the 2000s, the area was affected by rising crime, declining local economic conditions, and the crack cocaine epidemic. By the 2000s, many of the Black-owned business establishments that had a decades-long presence in the neighborhood closed.

=== Gentrification ===
In the late 1900s and early 2000s, the population of both Whites and Blacks declined in the area. The area was repopulated by an influx of Latino families in search of affordable housing, and the Latino population surpassed that of either Whites or Blacks. In the 2010s, after generations of economic stagnation, several new businesses opened in the 38th Street corridor, some by White business owners that did not live in the neighborhood. Several new businesses opened in store fronts that had been boarded up and vacant several years prior. Concerns about gentrification led to debate about how to maintain the historic Black character of the area.

=== Murder of George Floyd ===
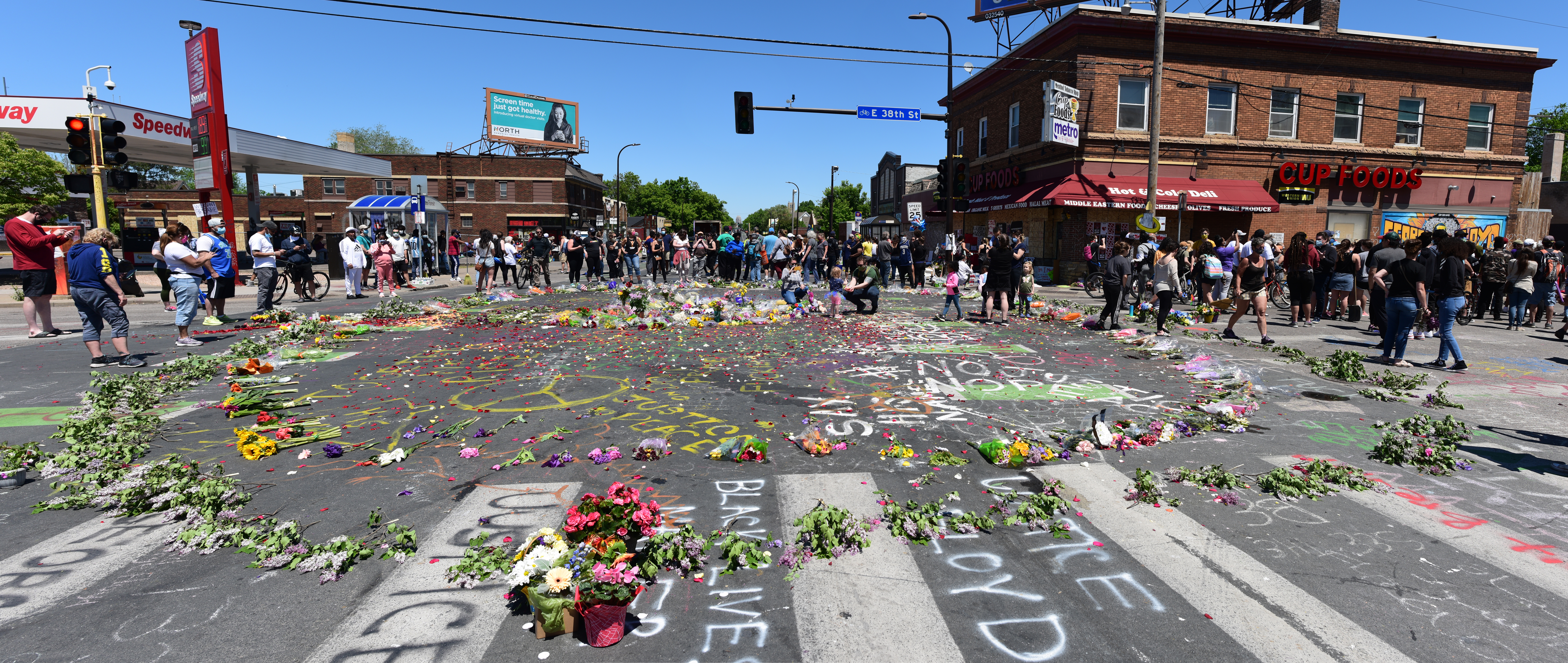
East 38th Street and Chicago Avenue, May 30, 2020

The 38th and Chicago street intersection was the location of the murder of George Floyd by Derek Chauvin, a police officer with the Minneapolis Police Department. Chauvin, a white man, knelt on the neck of Floyd, an unarmed Black man, for about 9 minutes and 29 seconds, on May 25, 2020. Soon after Floyd's murder, people left memorials to him there. The street intersection soon transitioned to an occupation protests referred to as George Floyd Square as protesters erected barricades to block vehicular traffic and transformed the space with public art of Floyd and that of other racial justice themes. The occupation protest persisted for over a year.

=== Cultural district designation ===
In 2015, residents and Minneapolis city counselors had begun planning for how to preserve African American history and culture in the area, and in 2019 local officials began the 38th Street Thrive! development plan to formally establish a 38th Street cultural district. As part of the Minneapolis 2040 zoning plan presented in August 2020 city officials designated the broader 38th Street South area as one of the city's seven new cultural districts to promote racial equity, preserve cultural identity, and promote economic growth. The officially designated 38th Street Cultural District included the segments of 37th to 39th streets south, from Nicollet to Bloomington avenues.

== Commemorative street names ==
Clarissa Rogers Walker Way: The length of 3rd Avenue South between 36th Street and 42nd Street was named in honor of Clarissa Walker, a social activist and community leader in the mid-to-late 1900s.

Launa Q. Newman Way: The length of 4th Avenue South between 36th Street and 42nd Street was named in honor of Launa Q. Newman who served as president of the Minnesota Spokesman-Recorder, a newspaper founded by her husband Cecil Newman, in the late 1900s.

George Perry Floyd Square: The length of Chicago Avenue between 37th and 39th streets was renamed as "George Perry Floyd Jr Place" in late 2020 to honor of George Floyd who was killed by a Minneapolis police officer outside the Cup Foods store on May 25, 2020. It was renamed "George Perry Floyd Square" in May 2022, but is more popularly referred to as "George Floyd Square".

== See also ==
- 38th Street station (Metro Transit)
- History of Minneapolis
- Neighborhoods of Minneapolis
- List of events and attractions in Minneapolis
- List of streets in Minneapolis
