= George Floyd Square =

Street in Minneapolis, Minnesota, United States

- George Perry Floyd Square; 3800 and 3900 blocks of Chicago Avenue
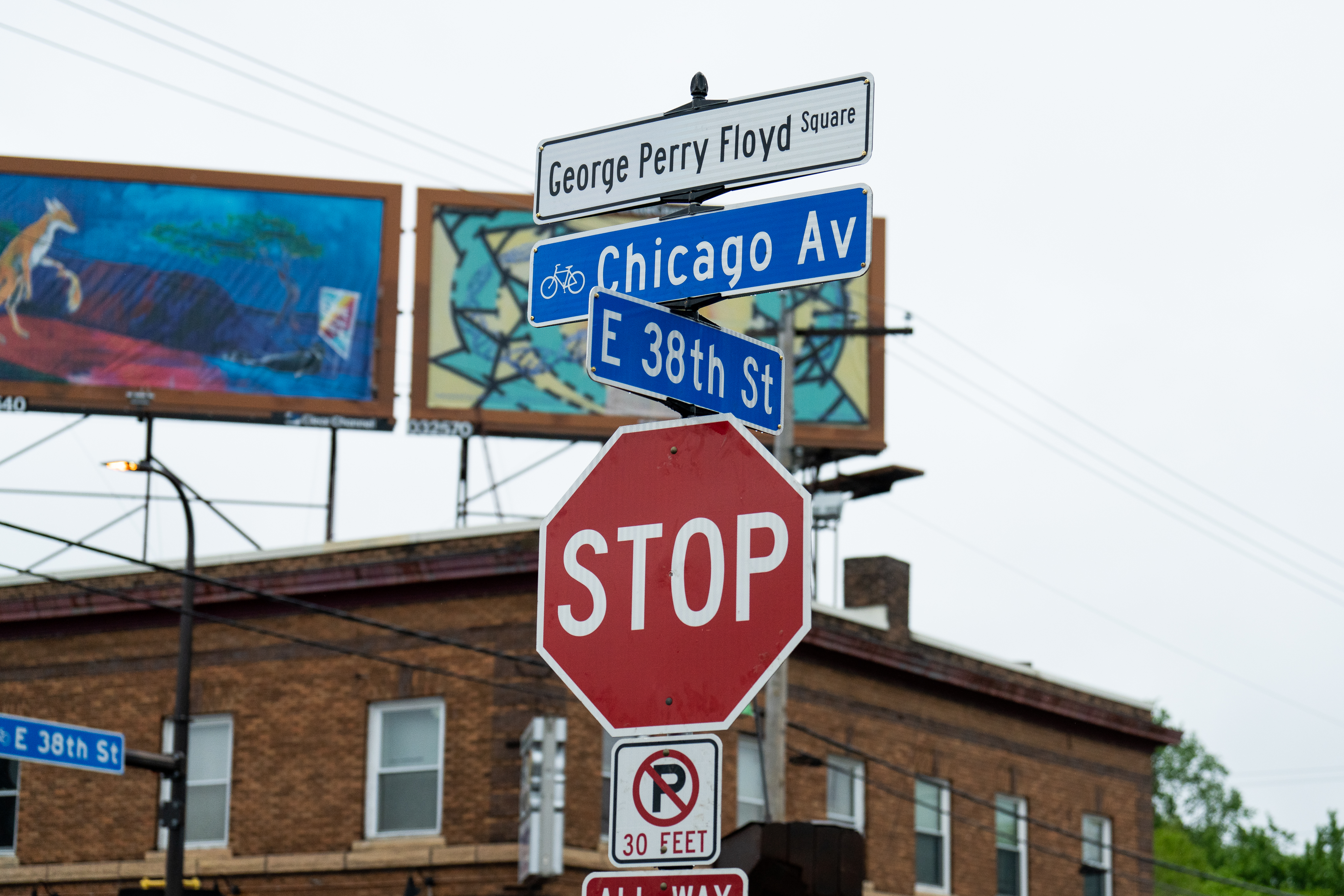
- Street sign, May 25, 2022
- Intersection location in Minneapolis.
- Former name: George Perry Floyd Jr. Place
- Part of: Powderhorn community
- Namesake: George Floyd
- Type: Commemorative street
- Owner: City of Minneapolis
- Length: Two city blocks
- Addresses: 3700-3900 Chicago Avenue
- Location: Minneapolis, Minnesota, United States
- Postal code: 55407
- Coordinates: 44.9343°N 93.2624°W
- From: East 37th Street (north)
- Major junctions: East 38th Street
- To: East 39th Street (south)

Construction
- Inauguration: May 25, 2022

Other
- Known for: Murder of George Floyd; George Floyd Square occupied protest; George Floyd memorial (planning phase)
- Website: minneapolismn.gov

George Floyd Square, officially George Perry Floyd Square in Minneapolis, is a commemorative name applied to Chicago Avenue between the East 37th and 39th Streets in the Powderhorn community. George Floyd, a Black man, was murdered there by police officer Derek Chauvin in 2020. The name addition, approved in 2022, is indicated by supplementary signs; businesses along the two blocks retain their Chicago Avenue addresses.

Public outrage over Floyd's murder resulted in one of the largest mass protest movements since the 1960s civil rights movement, largely over issues of systemic racism and police brutality. In the following weeks, racial justice activists and some community members erected barricades to keep the East 38th Street and Chicago Avenue intersection closed to vehicular traffic for over a year after Floyd's murder. Artists and demonstrators installed several exhibits, paintings, sculptures, and other works of art to memorialize Floyd and visualize racial justice themes. The City of Minneapolis has been planning a permanent memorial to Floyd at the site.

== Geography ==
Chicago Avenue is a major north–south thoroughfare in Minneapolis. It was named Ames Street in an 1855 city plat map. Sometime in the late 1880s, the Minneapolis City Council changed the name of Ames Street to Chicago Avenue, but historians are unsure exactly when or why the street was renamed. Chicago Avenue intersects East 38th Street in the city's Powderhorn community. The 38th and Chicago street intersection is a border for several city neighborhoods: Bancroft, Bryant, Central, and Powderhorn Park.

== History ==
=== Murder of George Floyd ===
The East 38th Street and Chicago Avenue intersection was the location of the murder of George Floyd by Derek Chauvin, an officer with the Minneapolis Police Department. Chauvin, a White man, knelt on the neck of Floyd, an unarmed Black man, for about 9 minutes and 29 seconds while Floyd begged for help, said he could not breathe, lost consciousness, and died on May 25, 2020. The incident, which occurred in the street outside the Cup Foods store, was filmed by bystanders and circulated widely in the media. In reaction to Floyd's murder, protests began locally on May 26, 2020, and gave way to local and nationwide movements. After several days, the Black Lives Matter movement protests spread throughout the United States and to many other countries.

=== "Autonomous" zone ===
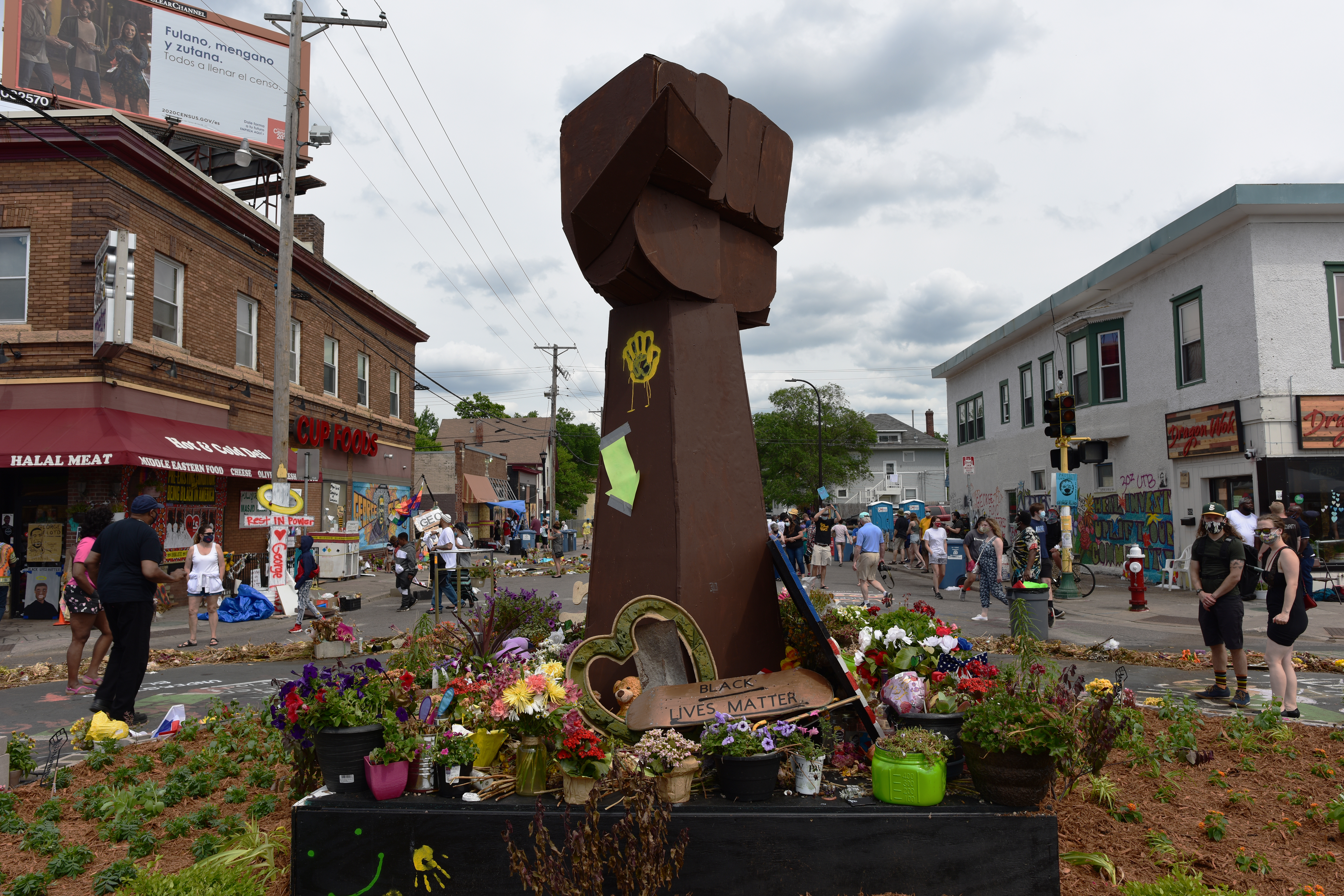
Fist sculpture and mementos, June 19, 2020

Soon after Floyd's murder, people left memorials to him near the Cup Foods store. The street intersection soon transitioned to an occupation protest referred to as George Floyd Square, as racial justice activists and some community members erected barricades to block vehicular traffic . The physical occupation of the street intersection after Floyd's murder persisted for over a year, but it was not without controversy. Some local businesses objected to the street closure and some neighbors felt perceptions that the area was "autonomous" or police-free led to an increase in violent crime. Vehicular traffic resumed through the street intersection on June 20, 2021.

=== Official designation and planning ===
In September 2020, the city named the two-block section of Chicago Avenue from East 37th Street (northern end) to East 39th Street (southern end) as "George Perry Floyd Jr. Place". The city again renamed the street way as "George Perry Floyd Square", with an inauguration ceremony taking place on May 25, 2022, the second anniversary of Floyd's murder.

Minneapolis officials designated the broader East 38th Street corridor as one of seven city cultural districts in late 2020. As part of the cultural district's long-term design plan, officials sought to preserve public art installments at the 38th and Chicago intersection that emerged in the aftermath of George Floyd's murder. The City of Minneapolis stated in mid 2021 that it would work with the local community to establish a permanent memorial at the street intersection. In 2022, the City of Minneapolis began a process to "re-envision" the streets of 38th Street East and Chicago Avenue to permanently incorporate memorials to George Floyd and make transportation improvements. The regional Metro Transit authority removed a previously planned rapid bus stop on the METRO D Line at 38th Street and Chicago Avenue, but said they would engage with the community on future plans for the area.

Amongst the protest occupation and permanent memorial planning, incidents of violent crime at the square area led to broader public discussion about public safety and policing. By August 14, 2022, six people had been killed by gun violence at the square since Floyd's murder, and one person had died there as the result of a drug overdose. The city purchased the abandoned Speedway gas station at the intersection that had been used as an informal community gathering space. In late 2023, city officials announced a timeline to gather community input on a permanent memorial and redesign of the area with implementation and construction taking place in 2026 and beyond.

== Visitors ==
George Floyd Square has hosted thousands of visitors from around the world. Caretakers for the memorial do not view the site as a tourist destination, but as a place for reflection about issues of racism and injustice. The site has been likened to other monuments of historic trauma, such as the Vietnam Veterans Memorial in Washington, D.C., and the Lorraine Motel in Memphis, Tennessee, where Martin Luther King Jr. was assassinated.

== Other features ==
=== Chicago Avenue Fire Arts Center ===
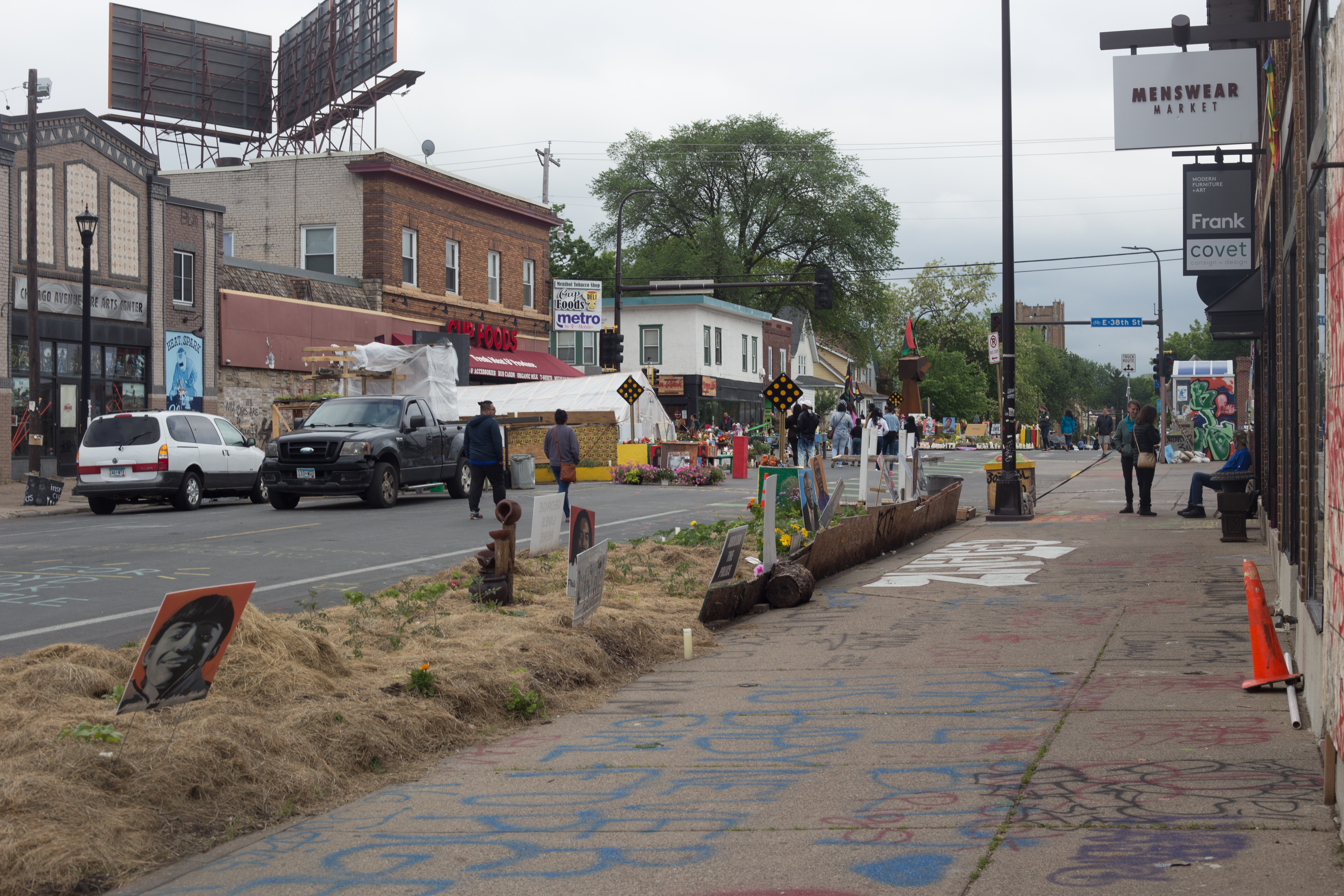
Chicago Avenue Fire Arts Center (at left), May 30, 2021

The Chicago Avenue Fire Arts Center occupies the space of the historic Nokomis Theater on the 3700 block of Chicago Avenue. The building was originally constructed in 1915 and designed by architect Joseph E. Nason. The theater was expanded in 1928 and remained for several decades until it closed in 1952 along with the Chicago Avenue streetcar line. The structure was significantly altered and was later used as an automobile repair shop until the building and many original architectural details were restored in the 2000s. The arts center was founded in 2007 by residents in the Central and Bryant neighborhoods with the goal to increase equity in public art. By 2020, the center was serving 800 artists per year.

=== Cup Foods ===
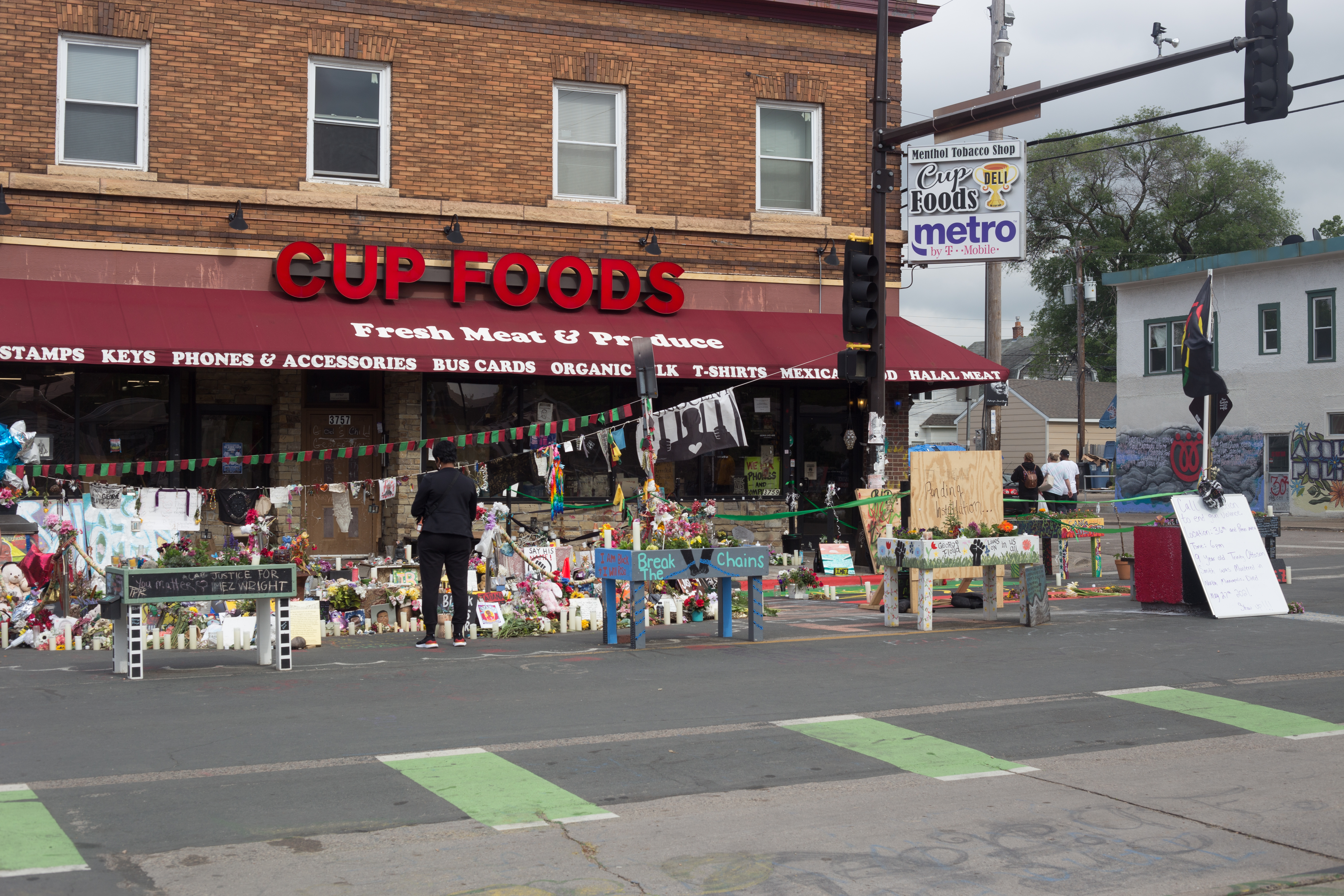
Cup Foods, May 30, 2021

Cup Foods, located on the 3700 block of Chicago Avenue, opened in 1989 as a combination grocery store, convenience store, and restaurant in the Powderhorn community in Minneapolis. Cup Foods was founded by Samir Abumayyaleh, who was born in Palestine and emigrated to the United States as a child. The name of the store was originally Chicago Unbeatable Prices, but later shortened to CUP. The area around the store had also been the location of violent crime, illicit drug dealing, loitering, and undercover police surveillance since the 1990s. In 2000, the city temporarily shut the store down for several months after recovering stolen electronics, ammunition, and materials for illicit drugs inside Cup Foods–leading to a constant police presence around the property.

On May 25, 2020, a 9-1-1 call from an employee at Cup Foods led to the fatal encounter between George Floyd and the Minneapolis police. The employee alleged that Floyd had paid using a suspected counterfeit $20 bill. Derek Chauvin and three other police officers arrived in response, and they arrested and detained Floyd. During the arrest, Chauvin pinned Floyd by his neck on the ground for 9 minutes and 29 seconds as he struggled to breathe and died. Several bystanders attempted to intervene unsuccessfully, but several captured video footage on their cellphones. Cup Foods closed temporarily during the George Floyd protests in Minneapolis–Saint Paul and unrest in mid 2020, but re-opened in August 2020. The store changed its name to Unity Foods in 2023.

=== Minnesota Agape Movement ===
Minnesota Agape Movement is a non-profit in Minneapolis with a headquarters office on the 3700 block of Chicago Avenue. The organization has contracts with the city to improve health and safety and build community in the area, often taking over functions that police might otherwise handle. The organization was formed shortly after the murder of George Floyd by members including Steve Floyd (no relation to George Floyd), a longtime street outreach worker for the area. Members of Agape were involved with putting up the barricades around George Floyd Square in May 2020 and Agape led the effort to reopen the square in June 2021.

=== Rise and Remember ===
Rise and Remember, formerly George Floyd Global Memorial, is a 501(c)3 organization in Minneapolis with a headquarters' office on the 3500 block of Chicago Avenue. The organization acts as a curator of the demonstrator-installed art exhibits at George Floyd Square. Its mission is to inventory, collect, and preserve the public art installations and the approximately 5,000 offerings that were left by visitors at the square.

== See also ==
- History of Minneapolis
- List of events and attractions in Minneapolis
- List of name changes due to the George Floyd protests
- List of streets in Minneapolis
- Memorials to George Floyd
