= Twin-City Herald =

- Type: Weekly newspaper
- Founder(s): Cecil Newman
- Publisher: Joshua Perry
- Founded: 1927
- Ceased publication: 1940
- City: Robbinsdale, Minnesota
- OCLC number: 1623725

The Twin-City Herald was a weekly African-American newspaper in Minneapolis, Minnesota, that ran from 1927 to 1940. The newspaper was created by Cecil E. Newman, a prominent civic leader in Minnesota who also founded the African American newspapers the Minneapolis Spokesman and the St. Paul Recorder. In its final year of publication, the Twin-City Herald was notably the oldest African American newspaper in Hennepin County, Minnesota.

== History ==
In April 1927, Cecil Newman and printer Joshua E. Perry launched the Twin-City Herald. Newman would serve as the paper's editor over the course of its run and Perry as its publisher. The first issue was published on April 30, 1927.

This was the first in a successful of newspapers the Newman led, followed by the Minneapolis Spokesman and the St. Paul Recorder. Newman had previously worked at the Kansas City Call, the city's Black newspaper, and as a Pullman porter while beginning work on the Twin-City Herald. Perry was trained as a printer at Storer College in Harper's Ferry, West Virginia, and operated the Perry Printing Company beginning in 1919. Perry went on to become the first Black printer to work at the Minneapolis Tribune (later the Star Tribune).

The Twin-City Herald covered local and national news, with a particular focus on job discrimination against African Americans in the Twin Cities. Among its writers included Estyr Bradley Peake.

Newman led the newspaper until 1934, when he left to start the Minneapolis Spokesman and St. Paul Recorder. Perry subsequently took over leadership of the Twin-City Herald until July 1940, at which point he sold the paper to Cormac A. Suel. At this point, the Twin-City Herald was the oldest African American newspaper in Hennepin County, Minnesota.

Suel moved the newspaper to Robbinsdale, Minnesota, where he published one more issue under its masthead before changing its name to the Robbinsdale American. Suel also dropped the African American editorial focus.

== Digitization efforts ==
In 2021, the Twin-City Herald was among a group of historic African American newspapers digitized at the Minnesota Historical Society through a project led by the National Endowment for the Arts. Also among this group were the Cecil Newman-led Minneapolis Spokesman, the St. Paul Recorder, and Timely Digest. About 1,800 pages of the Twin-City Herald were digitized in this project for online use.
