= Fambrough =

Fambrough is a surname. Notable people with the surname include:

- Charles Fambrough (1950–2011), American jazz bassist, composer and record producer
- Don Fambrough (1922–2011), American college football player and coach
- Henry Fambrough (1938–2024), American singer
- William L. Fambrough (1916–1983), American photographer
