= Lake Hiawatha =

Lake in Minnesota, U.S.

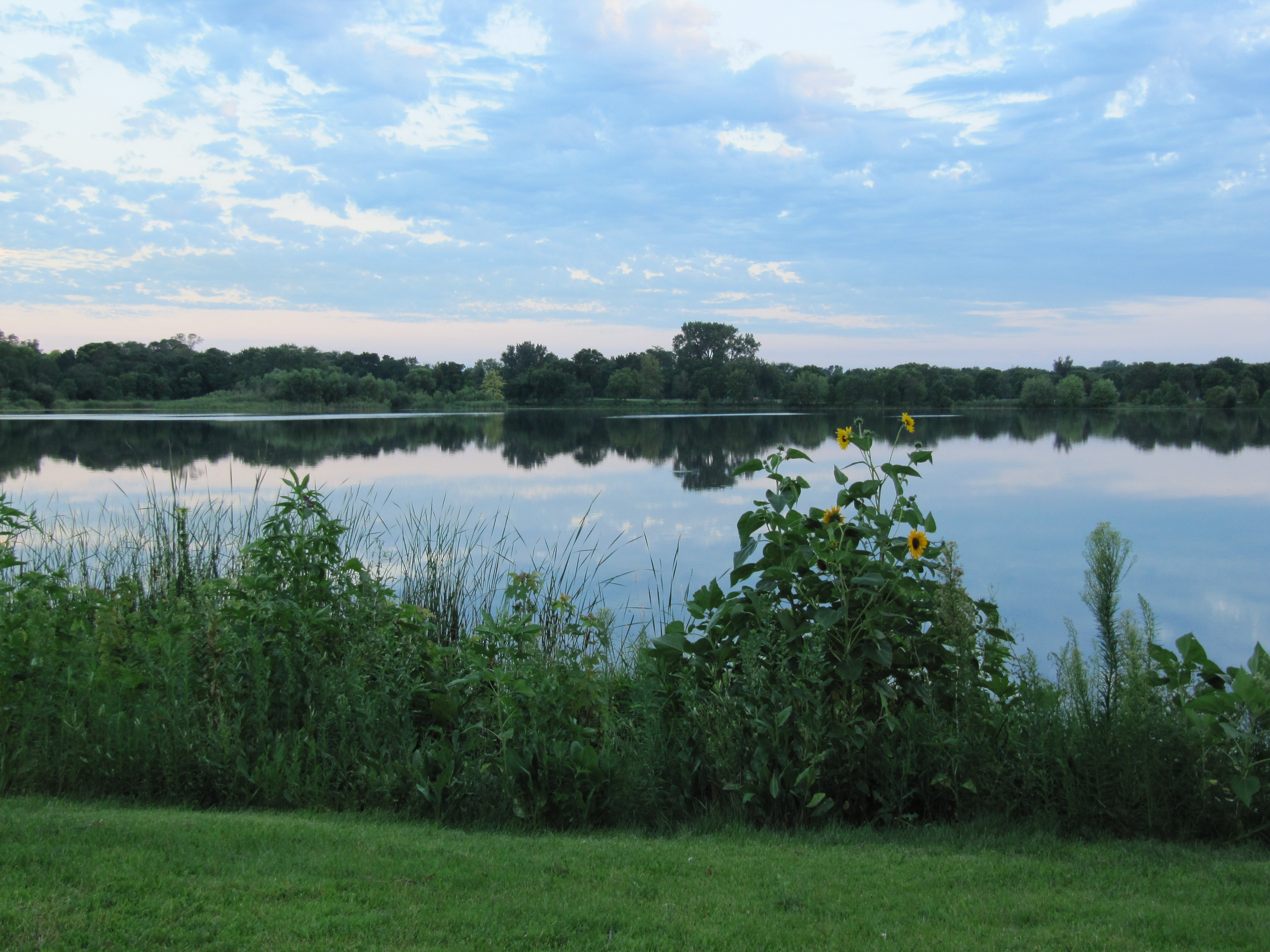
- Lake Hiawatha in July 2010

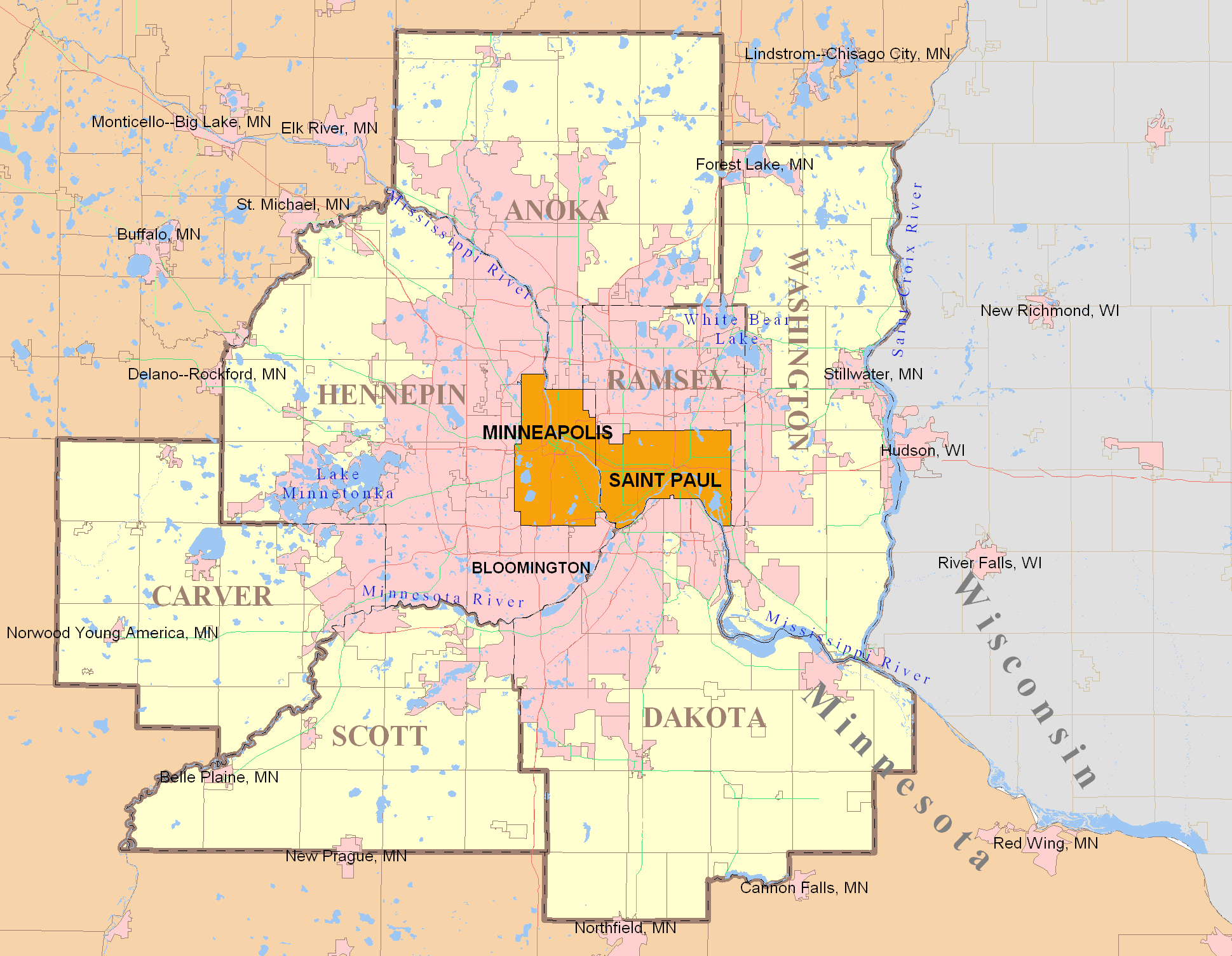
- Location within Minneapolis–Saint Paul
- Location: Minneapolis, Minnesota, United States
- Coordinates: 44°55′15″N 093°14′11″W
- Primary inflows: Minnehaha Creek
- Primary outflows: Minnehaha Creek
- Basin countries: United States
- Surface area: 53.5 acres (217,000 m^{2})
- Max. depth: 33 ft (10 m)
- Surface elevation: 814 ft (248 m)
- Frozen: winter

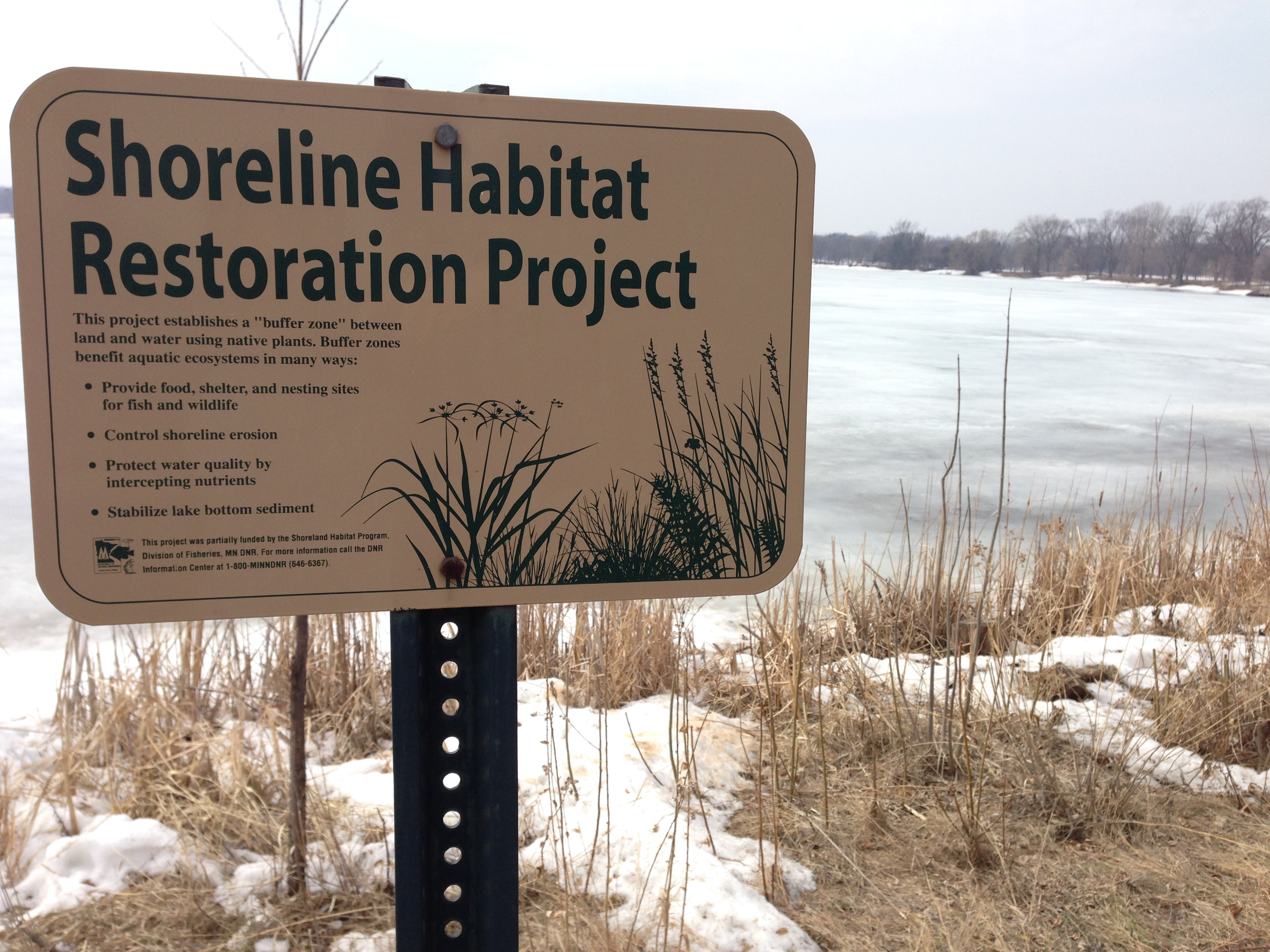
"Shoreline Habitat Restoration Project. This project establishes a 'buffer zone' between land and water using native plants. Buffer zones benefit aquatic systems in many ways: provide food, shelter, and nesting sites for fish and wildlife; control shoreline erosion; protect water quality by intercepting nutrients; stabilize lake bottom sediment. This project was partially funded by the Shoreline Habitat Program, Division of Fisheries, Minnesota Department of Natural Resources."

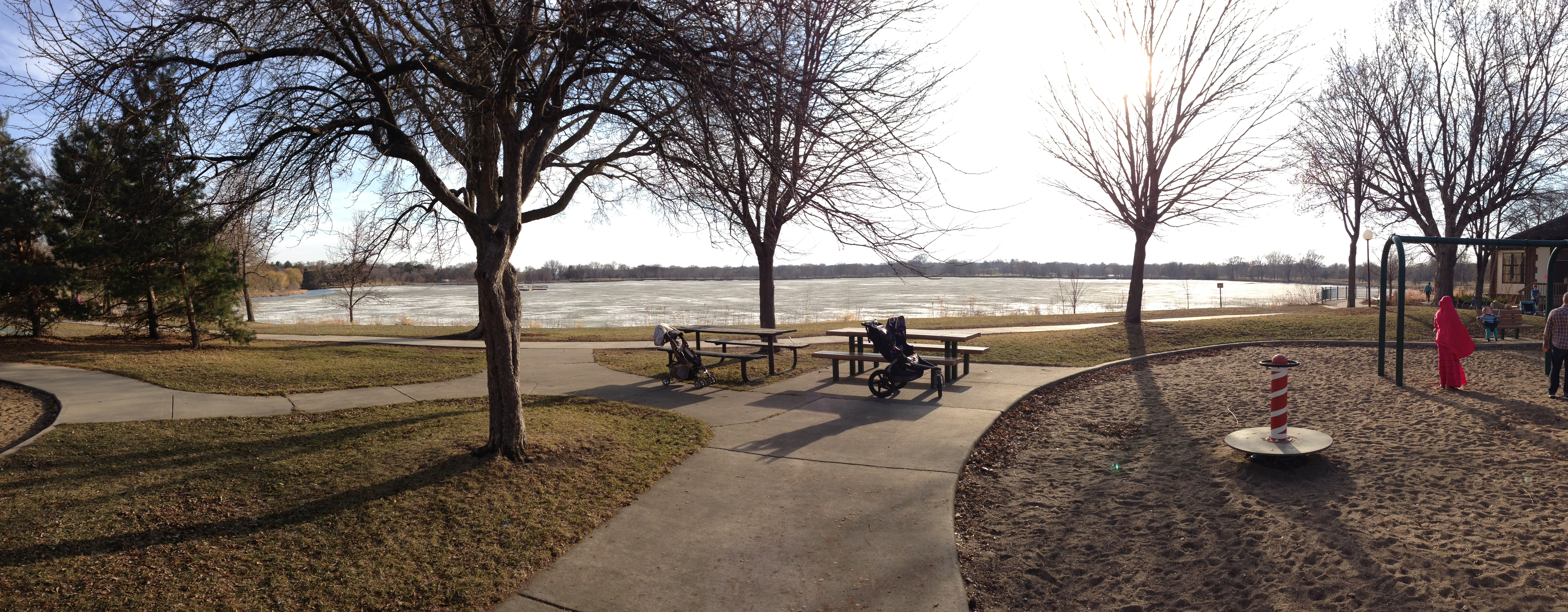
Lake Hiawatha from the playground on its eastern shore.

Lake Hiawatha is located just north of Lake Nokomis in Minneapolis, Minnesota.

== History ==
Lake Hiawatha was first named by American explorers as Lake Ann, in 1823. In 1835, it was renamed to Mud Lake by Lawrence Taliaferro. It was also called Rice Lake. It was purchased by the Minneapolis Park and Recreation Board in 1922 for $550,000. In 1924, it was renamed to Lake Hiawatha. Originally, in the 18th century, it was part of the Beverwyck Plantation, but then in the 1930s, after it was renamed to Lake Hiawatha, it was developed as a seasonal resort community before transitioning into a residential neighborhood.

== Features ==
The lake and park have a fishing dock, wading pool, tennis courts, and softball diamonds. There is a recreation center that hosts activities. The lake borders a municipal golf course. In winter the golf course has groomed cross country ski trails and the park has ice and hockey rinks. A 0.68-mile (1.09 km) shared-use path runs alongside the east side of the lake from East 43rd Street to Minnehaha Parkway where it connects to the Grand Rounds trail system and destinations such as Lake Nokomis, Minnehaha Creek, and Minnehaha Falls. Lake Hiawatha is one of the few lakes through which Minnehaha Creek flows, and the last one before it reaches Minnehaha Falls and then the Mississippi River.

== Advocacy ==
Friends of Lake Hiawatha is a community environmental action group that organizes volunteer efforts to clean the lake and park.

Hiawatha for All is an organization that advocates for the passage and effective implementation of the 9 Hole Plan. The 9 Hole Plan is the planning document created by the Park Board that will result in a restored wetland and flood resilient 9 hole golf course where the 18 hole golf course currently exists.

== Fish ==
The lake contains black bullhead, black crappie, bluegill, bowfin, carp, golden shiner, green sunfish, hybrid sunfish, largemouth bass, northern pike, pumpkinseed, walleye, white sucker, yellow bullhead, and yellow perch. Some fish consumption guideline restrictions have been placed on the lake's bluegill and northern pike due to mercury and/or PCB contamination.

== Water quality ==
Lake Hiawatha has much more garbage than any other Minneapolis lake. The lake is a stormwater outlet for the Corcoran, Central, Bryant, and Northrop neighborhoods, as well as the park's golf course. The Lake Hiawatha beach has been occasionally closed, such as in August 2014, because of unsafe levels of E. coli. Lake Hiawatha has been officially declared infested by zebra mussels since 2010, and in September 2013 park workers began finding mussels.

== Golf course ==
During the first few decades of the 20th century, golf was a relatively new sport and was becoming very popular in Minneapolis. Hiawatha Golf Course was the fifth golf course built by the Minneapolis Park Board, following courses at Theodore Wirth Park (known as Glenwood Park at the time) in 1916, Columbia Park in 1919, Gross Golf Course in 1925, and Meadowbrook Golf Course in 1925.

The Rice Lake marsh was dredged to a depth of 33 feet, and the dredged soil was placed on the west side, to form the rolling landscape where the golf course was built. The golf clubhouse was constructed in 1932, and the golf course was opened in July, 1934.

Following a 2014 flood that caused extensive damage to the course, and the subsequent discovery of unpermitted groundwater pumping, the park board embarked on the development of a new master plan for the site. The planning process resulted in a recommendation to reduce the course from 18 holes to 9 holes, enhance the learning facilities for golf, use a greatly expanded wetland space to manage flooding and treat pollution, and introduce several new park amenities like boat rentals and concessions. The plan was met with resistance by golfers who wished to retain 18 holes.

== See also ==
- List of lakes in Minneapolis
- List of shared-use paths in Minneapolis
