= Powderhorn, Minneapolis =

Community of Minneapolis

Coordinates: 44.9393°N 93.2631°W

Powderhorn
- Community
- Powderhorn Lake

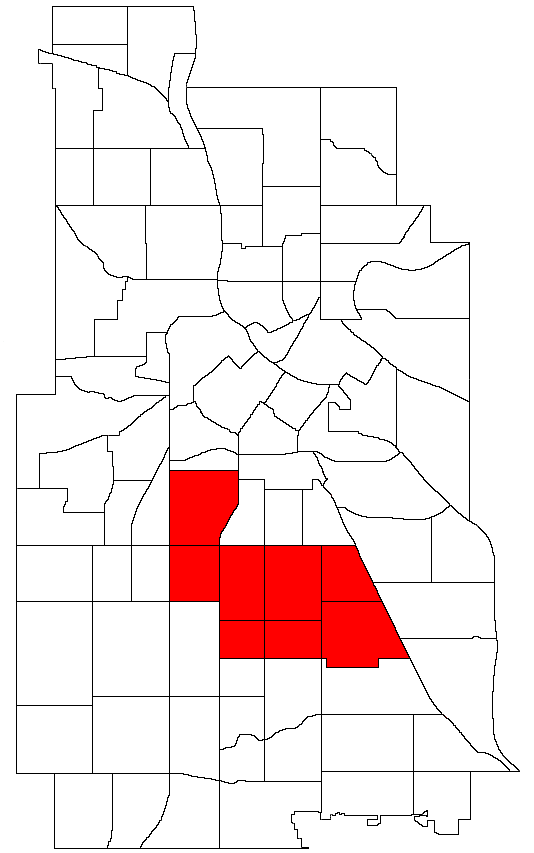
- Location of Powderhorn within the U.S. city of Minneapolis
- Interactive map of Powderhorn
- Country: United States
- State: Minnesota
- County: Hennepin
- City: Minneapolis
- Founded: 1849
- City Council Wards: 8, 9, 10, 12
- Neighborhoods: List: Bancroft; Bryant; Central; Corcoran; Lyndale; Powderhorn Park; Standish; Whittier

Government
  - Council Members: Soren Stevenson, Jason Chavez, Aisha Chughtai, Aurin Chowdhury
  - State senators: Omar Fateh, Zaynab Mohamed
  - State representatives: Anquam Mahamoud, Aisha Gomez, Samantha Sencer-Mura

Area
  - Total: 4.559 sq mi (11.81 km^{2})

Population (2020)
  - Total: 55,913
  - Density: 12,260/sq mi (4,735/km^{2})
- Time zone: UTC−6 (CST)
  - Summer (DST): UTC−5 (CDT)
- ZIP Codes: 55404–55409
- Area code: 612

Historical population
Census	Pop.	Note	%±
1980	51,519		—
1990	51,954		0.8%
2000	57,299		10.3%
2010	54,743		−4.5%
2020	55,913		2.1%

Powderhorn is a defined community in Minneapolis that consists of eight neighborhoods. The community name is derived from Powderhorn Lake that is the centerpiece of the present-day Powderhorn Park. Located south of downtown, the community also features the Minneapolis Institute of Art, Hennepin History Museum, the Midtown Greenway trail, and numerous other establishments, many of which serve the Latin American and African diaspora.

The Powderhorn community contains a large portion of City Council wards 9 and 10 and smaller parts of Wards 8 and 12. It is also located in legislative districts 62A, 62B, and a small portion of 63A.

== Neighborhoods in the Powderhorn community ==
- Bancroft
- Bryant
- Central
- Corcoran
- Lyndale
- Powderhorn Park
- Standish
- Whittier

While most of Powderhorn is east of Interstate 35W and south of Lake Street, both the Lyndale and Whittier neighborhoods are west of I-35W, while Whittier is also north of Lake Street.

== See also ==
- 38th Street (Minneapolis)
- George Floyd Square
