= Lyndale, Minneapolis =

Coordinates: 44.9414°N 93.2809°W

Lyndale
- Neighborhood
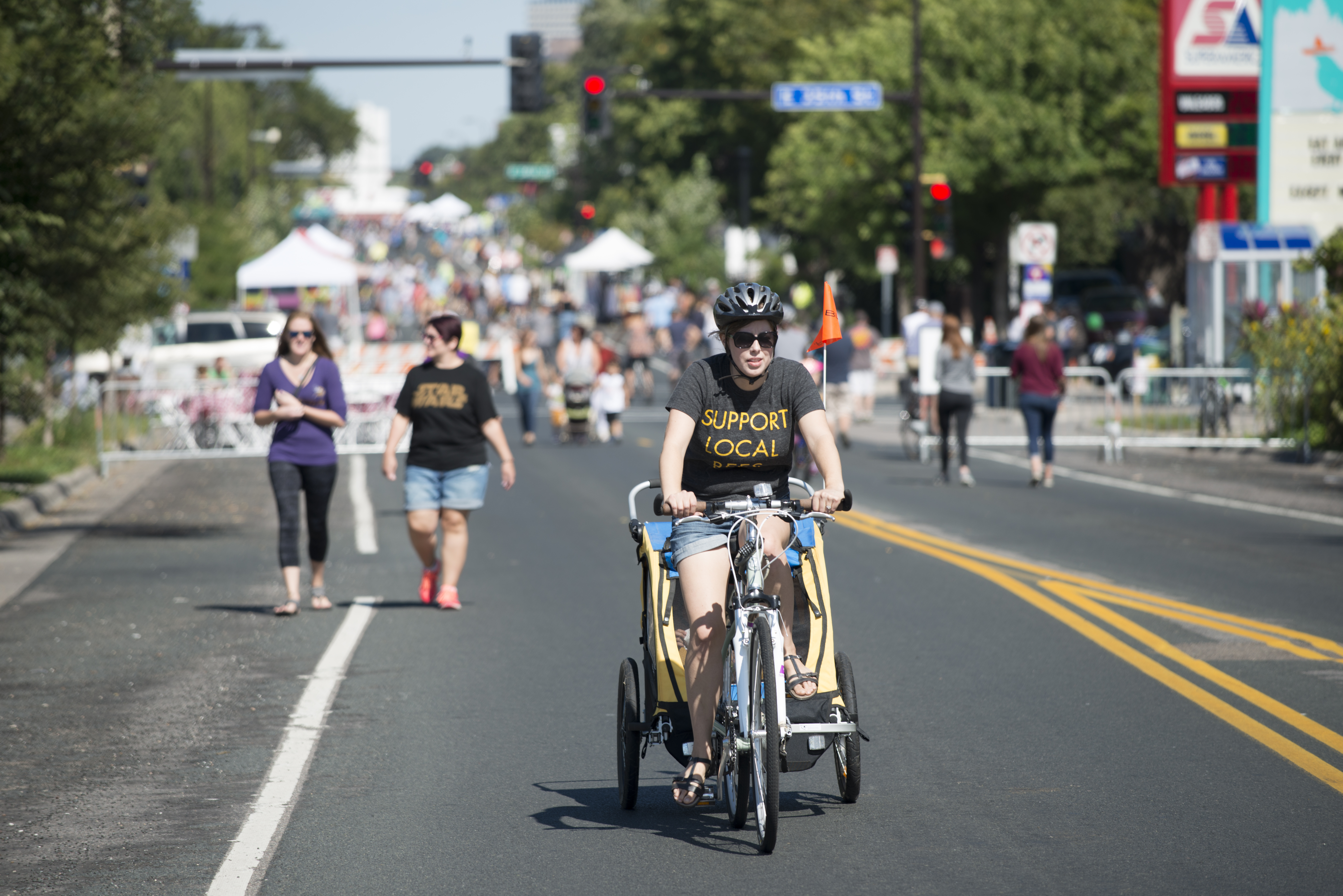
- Nicollet Ave during Open Streets 2016

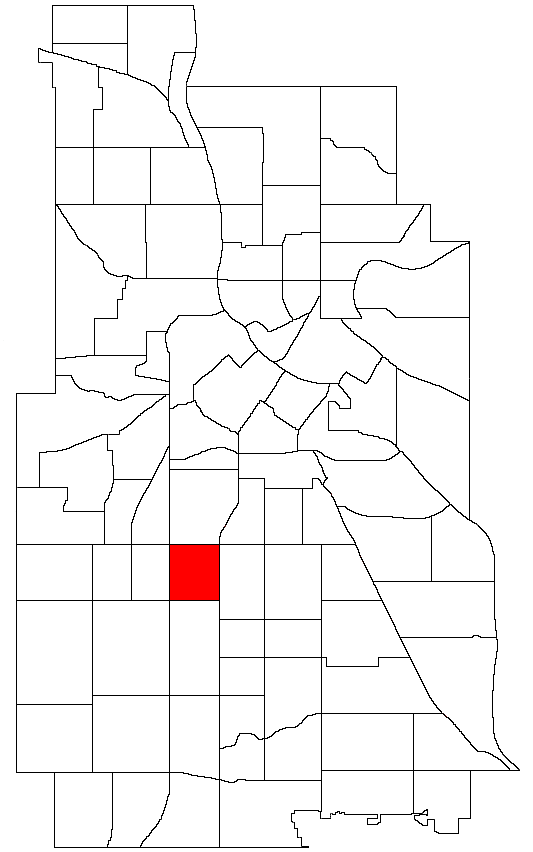
- Location of Lyndale within the U.S. city of Minneapolis
- Interactive map of Lyndale
- Country: United States
- State: Minnesota
- County: Hennepin
- City: Minneapolis
- Community: Powderhorn
- Founded: 1849
- City Council Ward: 8

Government
  - Council Member: Soren Stevenson

Area
  - Total: 0.483 sq mi (1.25 km^{2})

Population (2020)
  - Total: 7,251
  - Density: 15,000/sq mi (5,800/km^{2})
- Time zone: UTC-6 (CST)
  - Summer (DST): UTC-5 (CDT)
- ZIP code: 55408
- Area code: 612

Historical population
Census	Pop.	Note	%±
1980	7,167		—
1990	7,239		1.0%
2000	7,690		6.2%
2010	7,419		−3.5%
2020	7,251		−2.3%

Lyndale is a neighborhood within the Powderhorn community in south Minneapolis, Minnesota, United States. Its boundaries are Lake Street to the north, Interstate 35W to the east, 36th Street to the south and Lyndale Avenue South to the west.

The neighborhood is separated from most of the rest of the Powderhorn community by Interstate 35W. It is entirely located within Minneapolis City Council ward 8 and legislative district 62A.

== Demographics ==
Race/ethnicity
Race/ethnicity	2000		2010		2020	
Race/ethnicity	Number	%	Number	%	Number	%
White alone	3,786	49.23	3,499	47.16	3,650	51.01
Black alone	1,477	19.21	1,535	20.69	1,665	23.27
Hispanic or Latino (any race)	1,646	21.40	1,791	24.14	1,286	17.97
Native American alone	101	1.31	95	1.28	68	0.95
Asian alone	324	4.21	184	2.48	145	2.03
Other race alone	27	0.35	52	0.70	39	0.55
Pacific Islander alone	6	0.08	6	0.08	2	0.03
Two or more races	323	4.20	257	3.46	300	4.19
Total	7,690	100.0	7,419	100.0	7,155	100.0

== Schools ==
- Lyndale Community School (K-5), 312 West 34th Street, Minneapolis, MN 55408.

== Notable people ==
- Alex Pretti, a nurse who was shot dead by United States Border Patrol agents in 2026
