= Clarissa Walker =

American activist and community leader

Clarissa Rogers Walker
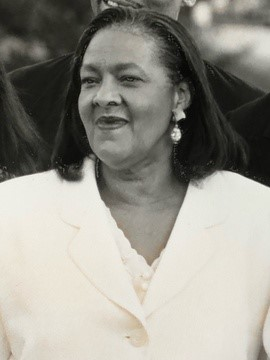
- Born: November 6, 1931; Kansas City, Missouri, US
- Died: March 7, 2011; Minneapolis, Minnesota, US
- Other name: Clarissa Walker
- Occupation: Civic Activist
- Known for: Sabathani Community Center
- Children: Karon Rogers, Sara Rogers, Rock Rogers, Juan Rogers, Vann Rogers, Bret Rogers, Neva Walker

Clarissa Rogers Walker (died March 7, 2011) was an American social activist and community leader based in Minneapolis, Minnesota. She was known for her social contributions in the South Minneapolis area for the African-American community. She served for more than three decades as the director of Sabathani Community Center, a multi-ethnicity community service center in Minneapolis, Minnesota. In November 2019, the City Council of Minneapolis announced a commemorative honor to Walker along with activist Launa Newman by renaming and dedicating specific portions of avenues amongst the 38th Street corridor to their names respectively as a tribute to their contributions.

== Early and family life ==
Walker, a native of Kansas City, Missouri, settled at Minneapolis in the year 1955 with her first daughter Karon.

== Social work career ==
Walker's social work and welfare activity were primarily based on the advocacy of human rights and better living for the communities of the twin cities by providing basic amenities such as shelter, food and clothing. Her commencement of the social service started when she joined a Minneapolis Hospital as a room technician and then a surgical nurse at the University of Minnesota and North Memorial Hospitals.

In 1968, she was appointed at Sabathani Community Center as a youth supervisor under the guidance of Sabathani Church. Inside the organization she consequently served in several positions including Social Worker/Counselor, assistant director, Acting Executive Director to name a few. In 1971, she obtained a bachelor's degree in sociology from the University of Minnesota. She also pursued post graduation in Business Management and became a licensed social worker. Later she also worked in various capacities within the organization including Program Director of Family Resource Program. She was associated with the Neighborhood Housing Services of America Board, the Neighborhood Reinvestment Regional Advisory Committee, the Second Harvest Food Bank Board, the Minnesota Extension Advisory Committee, the United Way First Call for Help Committee etc.

In 1975, Walker opened a food shelf in response to hunger amongst families in the neighborhood. In 1976, she became the founding president of the Southside Neighborhood Housing Services and took the significant role in providing home loans and grants to the people in the surrounding communities. She also served as a board member of National Housing Reinvestment for nearly 25 years. In 1979, Walker started a tax preparation initiative for low income people, which was later named as AccountAbility Minnesota. During this time, Walker was also involved in the Senior Citizen Advisory Committee to the Mayor of Minneapolis, the Project for Pride in Living, the Lake Street Partners Board and the Central Neighborhood Improvement Association.

== Death and legacy ==
Walker died on March 7, 2011, at her home.

In November 2019, the City Council of Minneapolis announced a commemorative tribute to Walker by renaming an avenue stretching several blocks and part of the 38th Street Corridor after her name. In the 2021 strategic development plan, the planning committee of the City Council of Minneapolis proposed the development of Clarissa Walker’s Homebuyer Club, to provide assistance and services related to home buying for low and middle income earning community members within the district.

In 2001, Clarissa Walker's daughter Neva Walker was elected to the Minnesota House of Representatives, and become the first Black woman in the Minnesota Legislature.

== Honors ==
- David W. Preus Servant Leadership Award in 2004.
- The road between East 36th and 42nd streets on 3rd Avenue renamed to Clarissa Rogers Walker Way in 2019.

== Sources ==
- The Session Weekly. United States, The House, 2001.
- Roche, Patrick Anthony. Segmented Education as Affirmative Action: A Case Study of a Pipeline Approach to Access Through Neighborhood Learning Centers. N.p., University of Minnesota, 1995.
- Roche, Patrick A.. Minority Access to Higher Education: An Analysis of a Pipeline Approach Through Neighborhood Learning Centers : the Minnesota Experiment. United States, University Press of America, 1994.
- Department of Housing and Urban Development—independent Agencies Appropriations for 1983: Hearings Before a Subcommittee of the Committee on Appropriations, House of Representatives, Ninety-seventh Congress, Second Session. United States, U.S. Government Printing Office, 1982.
- Departments of Veterans Affairs and Housing and Urban Development, and Independent Agencies Appropriations for 1992: Hearings Before a Subcommittee of the Committee on Appropriations, House of Representatives, One Hundred Second Congress, First Session. United States, U.S. Government Printing Office, 1991.
- Proceedings of the City Council of the City of Minneapolis. United States, The council.
- The Lutheran. United States, Lutheran Church in America, 1981.
