= Launa Q. Newman =

American journalist

- Born: Launa Quincy; December 30, 1920; Topeka, Kansas, US
- Died: February 3, 2009 (aged 88); Minneapolis, Minnesota, US
- Monuments: Launa Q. Newman Way
- Occupations: Journalist; Civic Activist
- Known for: Minnesota Spokesman-Recorder
- Spouse: Cecil Newman

Launa Q. Newman (December 30, 1920 – February 3, 2009) was an American journalist and social activist based in Minneapolis, Minnesota. She is known for her social contributions in the South Minneapolis area for the African-American community. She was also the publisher of The Minneapolis Spokesman and St. Paul Recorder (later merged to Minnesota Spokesman-Recorder), along with her husband Cecil Newman.

== Personal life ==
Launa Newman was born in Topeka, Kansas to Gilber Quincy and Ethel Quincy. At the age of two, her family relocated to Des Moines, Iowa. At Des Moines, Gilber started a tailoring and cleaning business. She married her first husband Wallace O’Neal Jackman in Des Moines. She had two children with Jackman. She moved to the Twin Cities in 1958. After nine years, she married her second husband, Cecil Earl Newman in 1967.

== Journalist career ==
Cecil and Launa were fierce advocates for "non-racist Minneapolis and St. Paul". Cecil started the two newspapers, the Minneapolis Spokesman and the St. Paul Recorder, in 1934. The office space of the two newspapers was moved to 3744 Fourth Avenue South in 1958. When Cecil was heading the publication, Launa started to help her husband by working in the circulation area and carrying out the public relation works. Gradually she started to cater the managerial responsibilities of the community run media house and as the confidant to Cecil.

After her husband's death in 1978, Launa took the charge of the newspaper and modernized the printing system and operational aspects. The two separate newspaper were merged in Minnesota Spokesman-Recorder in 2000. Launa relinquished the charge of the business to her children Oscar Newman (son of Cecil), Norma Jean Williams and Wallace Jackman (children of Wallace O’Neal Jackman) and devoted her times to community service. She served on the board of Minneapolis Boy's Club and was the member of Minneapolis Women's Club. In 2007, she officially sold the newspaper business to her granddaughter Tracey Williams and retired from her journalistic career after serving for the newspaper for 32 years.

== Legacy ==
In November 2019, the Mayor and the City Council of Minneapolis announced a commemorative honor to Launa Newman along with activist Clarissa Walker by renaming the 38th Street corridor to their names respectively. The announcement says "Launa Q. Newman Way will run from East 36th Street to East 42nd Street along 4th Avenue South in Minneapolis".

== See also ==
- 38th Street (Minneapolis)
