= The Call (Kansas City) =

African-American weekly newspaper

- Type: Weekly newspaper
- Founder: Chester A. Franklin
- Founded: May 1919; 106 years ago
- Language: English
- City: Kansas City, Missouri
- Country: United States
- OCLC number: 1084715622
- Website: www.kccallnews.net

Kansas City The Call, or The Call is an African-American weekly newspaper founded in 1919 in Kansas City, Missouri, by Chester A. Franklin. It continues to serve the black community of Kansas City, Missouri, and Kansas City, Kansas.

== History ==
Before 1827, when the African-American newspaper Freedom's Journal was founded in New York City, there were no black-owned and operated newspapers. News of their community was not generally covered by white journalists, and the mainstream press expressed bias against blacks. This reduced communication both within and outside the communities. Black publications have struggled to survive, given difficulties in financing. With the majority of black population in the South until the 20th-century Great Migrations, Northern blacks were not served by Southern papers.

== Founder ==
Chester Arthur Franklin, or "C.A." (1880–1955), founded The Call newspaper in May 1919 in Kansas City, Missouri. He owned and operated it until his death on May 7, 1955, establishing an office also in Kansas City, Kansas.

Franklin was born in Texas on June 7, 1880, the only child of George F. Franklin, a barber, and Clara Belle (née Williams) Franklin, a teacher. Tired of racial segregation and disfranchisement of minorities in Texas, his family moved to Omaha, Nebraska, and eventually to Denver, Colorado, in search of opportunities. There Chester worked for his father, who owned local newspapers in both cities.

Eventually Franklin took over Denver's The Star for his father; he printed, edited, and distributed the paper until 1913.

That year, Franklin decided to move to Kansas City, Missouri, having heard about its growing African-American population and vibrant music and culture. Franklin intended to start up a paper and gain a larger audience within Missouri and Kansas. He set up his own printing shop before organizing to publish his own newspaper. His mother had accompanied him and his family. Franklin launched The Call and sold copies for 5 cents; his mother helped by peddling subscriptions door to door.

Franklin taught himself how to use the Linotype machine, because white union workers were not allowed to assist blacks. He developed the newspaper, and The Call became one of the six largest African-American weeklies in the country, and one of the largest black-owned and operated businesses in the Midwest. "During its first eight years, The Call grew steadily from a circulation of about 2,000 in 1919 to 16,737 in 1927, and then remained at that level until the late 1930s". The newspaper employed (and still employs) many African Americans in the Kansas City community.

== Franklin's vision ==
Franklin wanted to develop a paper that empowered and gave a voice to the black community, while being free of sensationalism. He advocated developing self-reliance within the community, siding strongly with the philosophy of W. E. B. Du Bois. In The Call, he included news and announcements of the local community, including celebrations such as graduations and graduates, and life passages such as deaths and memorials. He wanted the community to know and celebrate itself; their lives were reflected in his paper, instead of being ignored. Advertising promoted black businesses. Local and national news editorials gave a black perspective on certain events.

Franklin also included police reports and coverage of crimes, but some readers protested having negative news covered in the African-American community. They wrote letters urging more positive stories; Franklin responded that "the press is to publish, not suppress news...". his coverage included treatment of the community's religious life, from features and advertisements for pastors and formal church events, to news of potlucks.

== Franklin and Harry Truman ==
Franklin built a regional circulation, and enjoyed good advertising support from the business community. Franklin was a deeply committed conservative Republican, who slashed away every week at the corrupt Pendergast machine. However he was on good terms with one of Pendergast's top associates, Harry Truman. Franklin admired Truman's honesty and integrity—indeed that was the reason Pendergast promoted Truman, since he needed to appease the good government forces. Truman was a rare Democrat who gave significant support for the black community, so Franklin recommend voting for him in the 1934 and 1940 Senate elections. The two broke politically in 1941 over domestic issues; Franklin refused to join most black leaders in switching to the Democratic Party. However Franklin's cordial dealings with Truman over the years encouraged Truman to announce his unexpectedly strong support for civil rights in 1948.

== Relevance ==
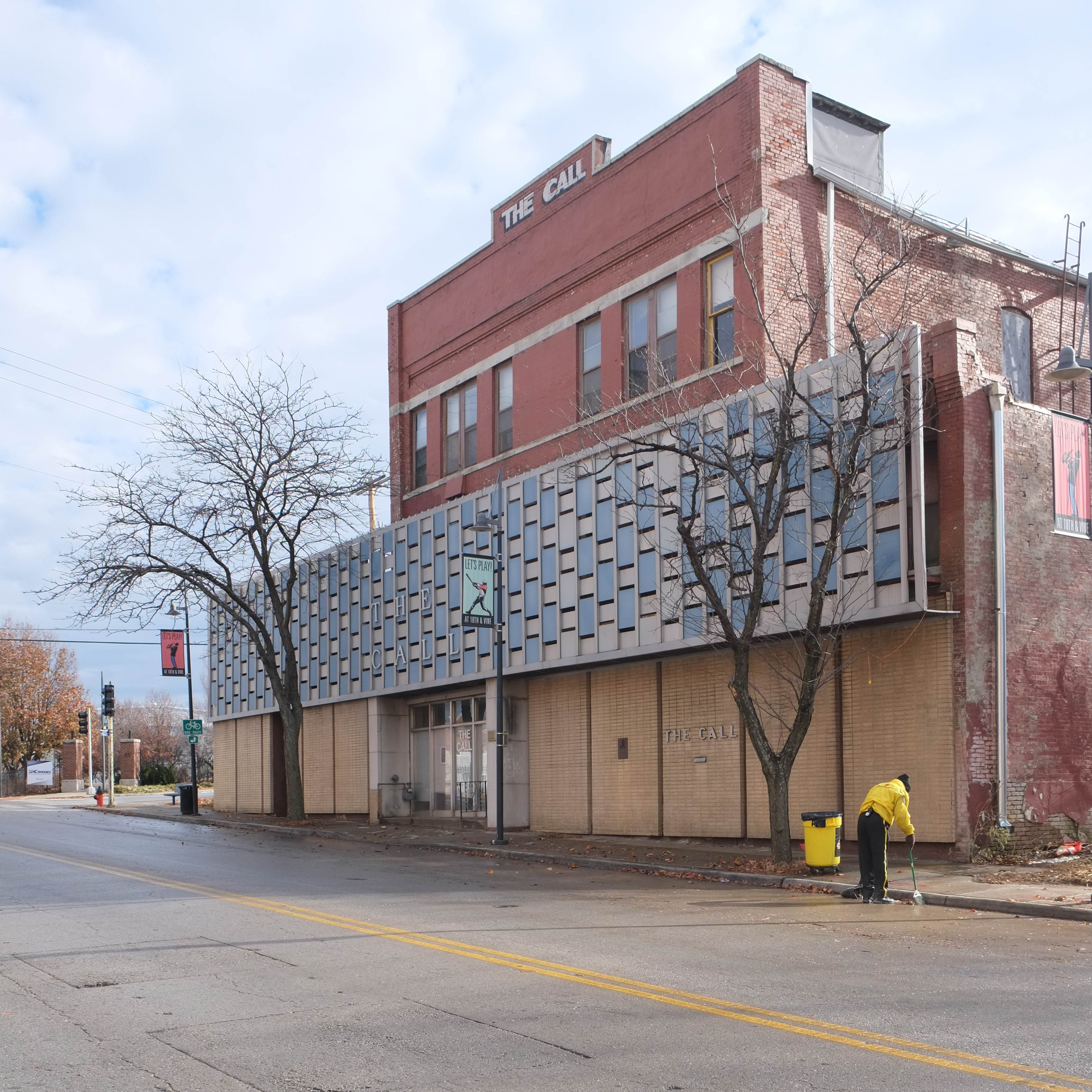
The Call building, December 2016

For over 100 years The Call has addressed many civil rights issues, some specific to the African-American community of Kansas City, and others related to conditions in the Midwest and the United States as a whole. Franklin urged blacks to register and vote.

During the 1950s, his editorials in The Call’s protested urban development in inner Kansas City that seemed designed to keep blacks segregated from whites, who began to move into new suburban developments in the 1950s and 60s following construction of highways for commuters. The paper condemned the building of urban projects that displace longtime residents and broke up working communities. He criticized the Housing Authority for their policies and the gentrification of black neighborhoods.

Kansas City schools were largely segregated. Lucile Bluford worked on this issue, especially in the case of Lloyd Gaines. Bluford and Gaines were both rejected from furthering their education based on the color of their skin, and both Bluford and Franklin used The Call as a platform for defending their cause. This included encouraging readers to donate to the NAACP. The Cat Call provides empowerment and the avocation of self-reliance to improve the African-American community.

The Call always believed firmly in reporting honestly and fairly, and that included their circulation statistics. Because of this, it was the first African-American newspaper admitted to the Alliance for Audited Media (formerly "Audit Bureau of Circulations"). Additionally, it was the first African-American newspaper to become an International News Service member in 1948 when it subscribed to one of the major wire services.

== Alumni ==
- Roy Wilkins, a reporter and managing editor from 1923 to 1931, who later wrote for NAACP's The Crisis and became executive director of the NAACP.
- Frank A. (Fay) Young, the pioneering African-American sportswriter, served as managing editor of The Call from 1934 to 1937.
- William L. Fambrough, photojournalist, whose work is featured in the Missouri Photojournalism Hall of Fame and the Black Archives of Mid-America.
- Ada Crogman Franklin, widow of C. A. Franklin, was the newspaper's president and publisher from 1955 to her death in 1983.
- Lucile Bluford, a University of Kansas alum, who became a reporter and managing editor for The Call. Opposed to segregation, she filed suit against the University of Missouri for discriminating against her admission. After C.A. Franklin died in 1955, Bluford became part-owner and the head of The Call, operating it until her death in 2003.
- Donna F. Stewart, a reporter became managing editor from 2001 to 2020 and became publisher in 2003.
- Eric L. Wesson Sr., a reporter became managing editor and publisher in 2020–2022.
- Tracy Allen is Editor in Chief (2023–present).
- Cecil Newman, an American civic leader and prominent businessman in Minneapolis, Minnesota, who established and led a number of prominent Black newspapers in the city, including the Twin-City Herald, Minneapolis Spokesman, and St. Paul Recorder.

== See also ==
- History of African Americans in Kansas
