= List of streets in Minneapolis =

This is a list of notable streets in Minneapolis, Minnesota, United States.

== Streets ==
- 38th Street (Minneapolis)
- Cedar Avenue
- Central Avenue
- Cheatham Avenue
- France Avenue
- Grand Rounds National Scenic Byway / Great River Road
- Hennepin Avenue
- Hiawatha Avenue
- Lake Street (Minneapolis)
- Lyndale Avenue
- Marq2 transit corridor
- Nicollet Avenue
- Nicollet Mall
- Park Avenue
- Portland Avenue
- University Avenue (Minneapolis–Saint Paul)
- Victory Memorial Parkway
- Virginia Triangle
- Washington Avenue (Minneapolis)

== Street intersections ==
- 50th & France
- George Floyd Square (38th and Chicago)
- Lyn-Lake

== See also ==
- List of lakes in Minneapolis
- Trails in Minneapolis
