= Cecil Newman =

American journalist (1903–1976)

- Cecil Newman in 1965
- Born: Cecil Earl Newman; July 25, 1903; Kansas City, Missouri, U.S.
- Died: February 7, 1976 (aged 72); Minneapolis, Minnesota, U.S.
- Resting place: Lakewood Cemetery
- Occupations: Journalist; Civic activist
- Known for: Minnesota Spokesman-Recorder
- Spouse: Launa Q. Newman

Cecil Earl Newman (July 25, 1903 – February 7, 1976) was an American civic leader and prominent businessman in Minneapolis, Minnesota. He was the editor and publisher of the Minneapolis Spokesman and the St. Paul Recorder.

He was a member of the Brotherhood of Sleeping Car Porters, a union that made major strides against segregation in the 1930s and 1940s, before the modern Civil Rights Movement.

== Early life ==
Cecil Earl Newman was born in Kansas City, Missouri, on 25 July 1903. Growing up, he sold newspapers and worked in the offices of the Kansas City Call, the city's Black newspaper.

== Career ==
Newman moved to Minneapolis from Kansas City in 1922. He began working as a porter in the railroad industry. He applied to work for mainstream papers in the Twin Cities, but was denied due to his race. He began working for the Black paper the Northwestern Bulletin and was a freelancer for the Chicago Defender.

He took over as editor of the Twin Cities Herald about 1927 and published the Timely Digest in 1932. In 1934, Newman became editor and publisher of the Minneapolis Spokesman and the St. Paul Recorder. Both papers covered local and national news, entertainment, and social and church affairs. Newman also wished to speak to white readers and advertisers to further equity and inclusion. Prominent Black leaders and authors such as Era Bell Thompson, Gordon Parks, and Carl Rowan wrote for his papers early in their careers. Newman was one of four black publishers in the Twin Cities, along with author Walter R. Scott, Mary Kyle of the Twin Cities Courier, and Jeanne Cooper of the Twin Cities Observer.

Newman believed in using his papers to further civil rights. This led to a confrontation with the local beer industry, as following the 1933 repeal of Prohibition, Newman called for a boycott of local breweries (including Hamm's) as they refused to employ any African Americans. During World War II, he advocated for African-American access to jobs at local munitions plants. In the 1960s, he pushed the newly-arrived Minnesota Twins to desegregate their spring training housing.

In 1948, Newman became the first Black president of the Minneapolis Urban League.

Newman had close and powerful political connections, including with Hubert Humphrey, who invited Newman to join him on the national stage after the 1964 presidential election. However, Newman wished to stay in Minnesota. Over the years, he claimed a connection to every Minnesota governor since the 1920s, including a friendship with moderate, business-minded Republicans like Wheelock Whitney Jr.

== Legacy ==
After Nicollet Avenue in Minneapolis was blocked by construction of a Kmart at Lake Street, a one block long, one-way street was added in order to allow north bound traffic from 1st Avenue South to get over to Nicollet; it was named Cecil Newman Lane.

The Minnesota Spokesman-Recorder (the Minneapolis Spokesman and the St. Paul Recorder merged in 2000) is the oldest continuously operated Black newspaper and possibly longest-lived Black-owned business in Minnesota. In 1958, it moved to 3744 Fourth Avenue South. In 2015, the Spokesman-Recorder' celebrated its eightieth anniversary and its building was designated a historic landmark. Historic issues of the paper are available to access online as part of the Minnesota Historical Society's digital newspaper hub.

== Personal life ==
Newman was married to Launa Q. Newman. The length of 4th Avenue South between 36th Street and 42nd Street was named in her honor as "Launa Q. Newman Way".

Newman died on February 7, 1976, at his home on York Avenue in Minneapolis. He was interred at Lakewood Cemetery.
