= List of events and attractions in Minneapolis =

== Annual events ==
Event	Usually
TwinsFest	January
City of Lakes Loppet	February
International Film Festival	April
May Day Parade	May
Art-A-Whirl	May
Minneapolis Marathon	May-June
Twin Cities Pride	June
Twin Cities Hot Summer Jazz Festival	June
Stone Arch Festival of the Arts	June
Svenskarnas Dag	June
Minneapolis Aquatennial	July
Art Car Parade	July
Basilica Block Party	July
Minnesota Fringe Festival	August
Sommerfest	July-August
Uptown, Loring and Powderhorn art fairs	August
Twin Cities Marathon	October
Art Attack	November
Holidazzle Parade	November-December

== Attractions ==
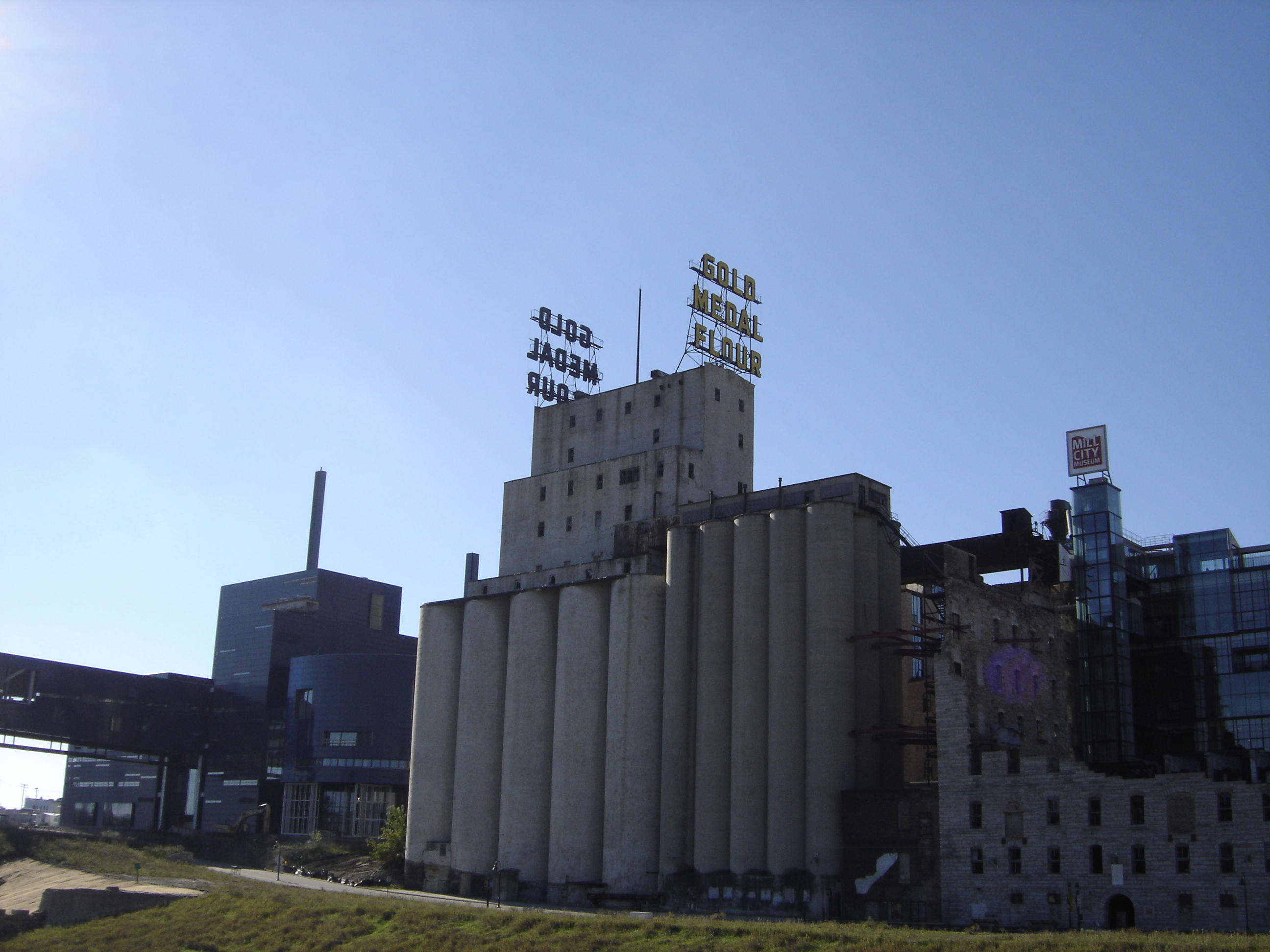
Guthrie Theater, Gold Medal Flour, Washburn "A" Mill, Mill City Museum

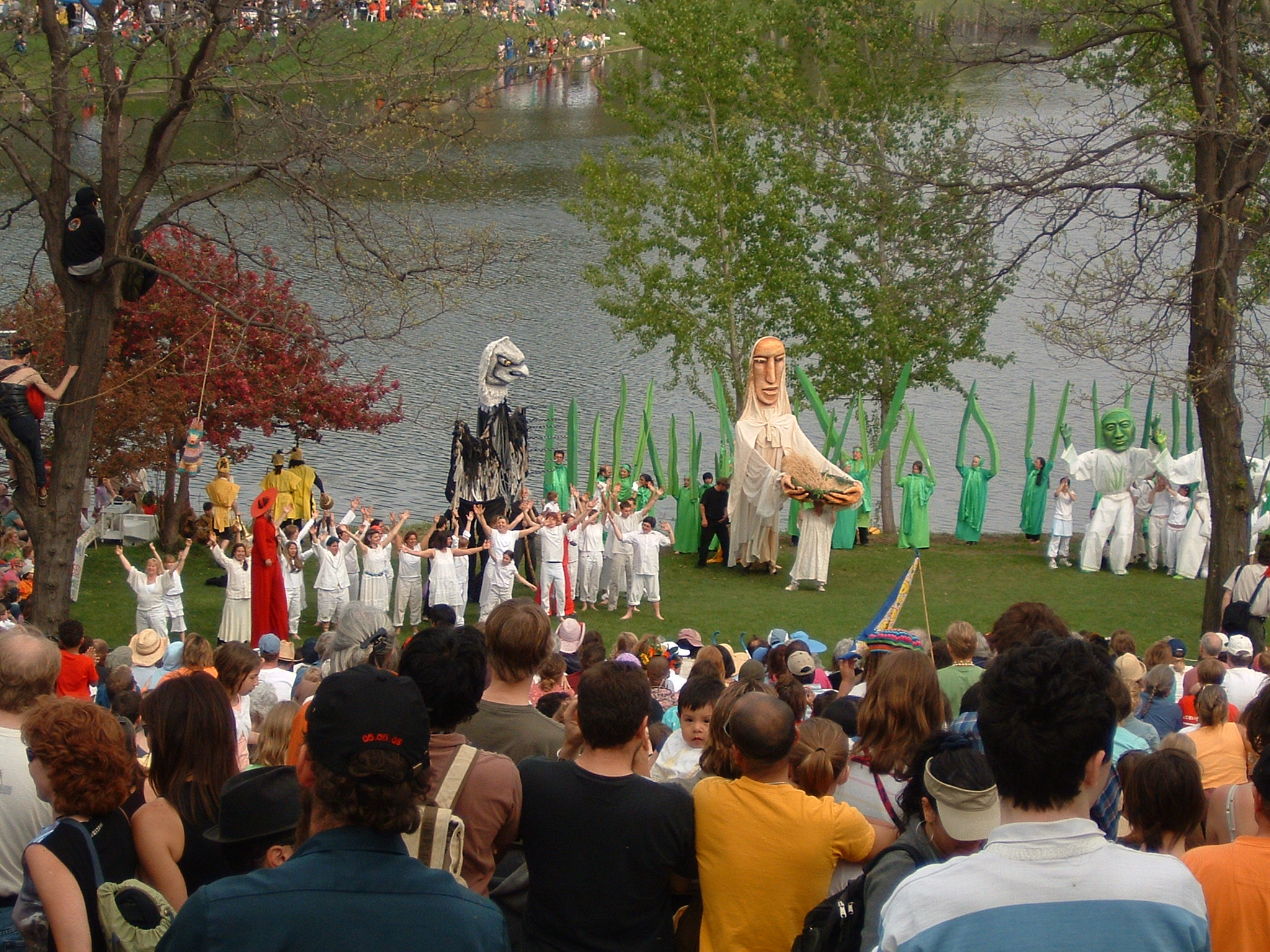
In the Heart of the Beast May Day Parade, Powderhorn Park

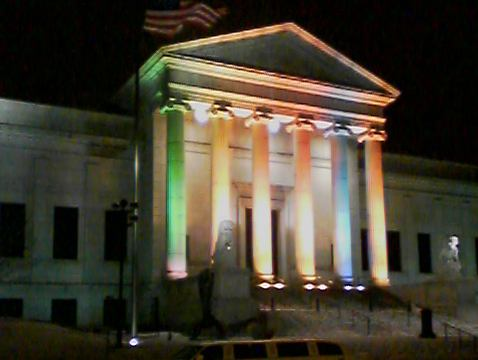
Minneapolis Institute of Arts

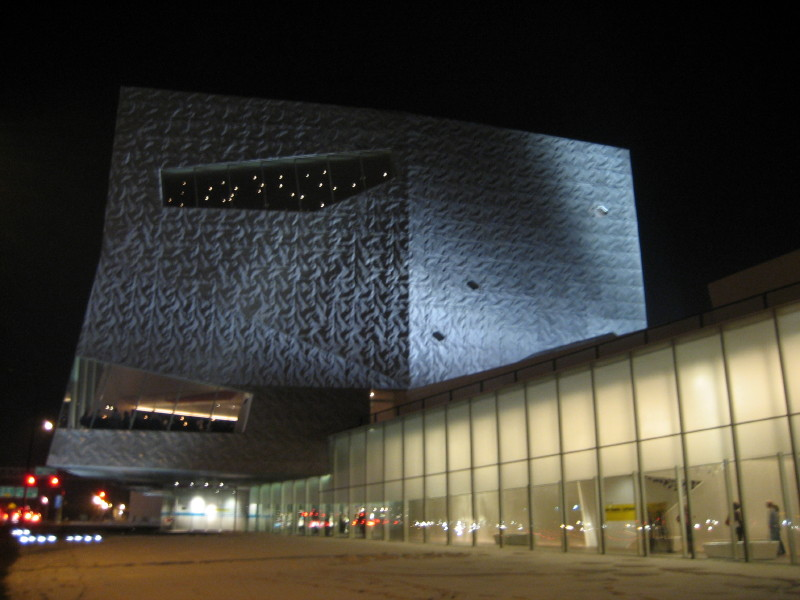
Walker Art Center

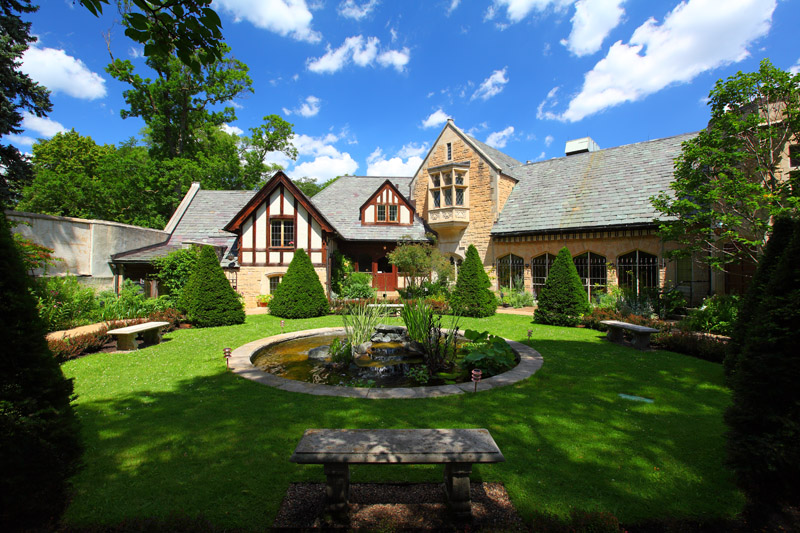
The Bakken Museum

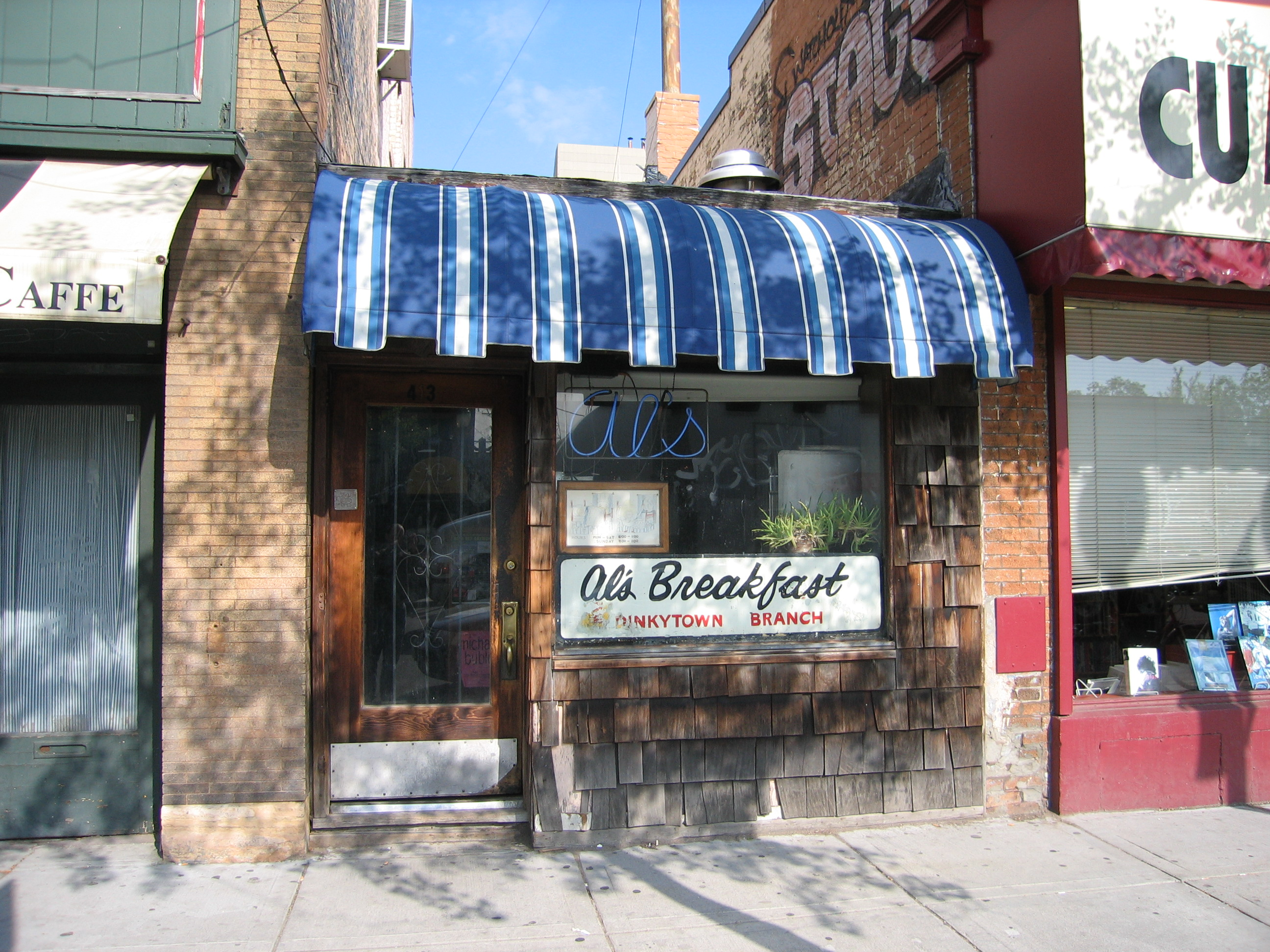
Al's Breakfast

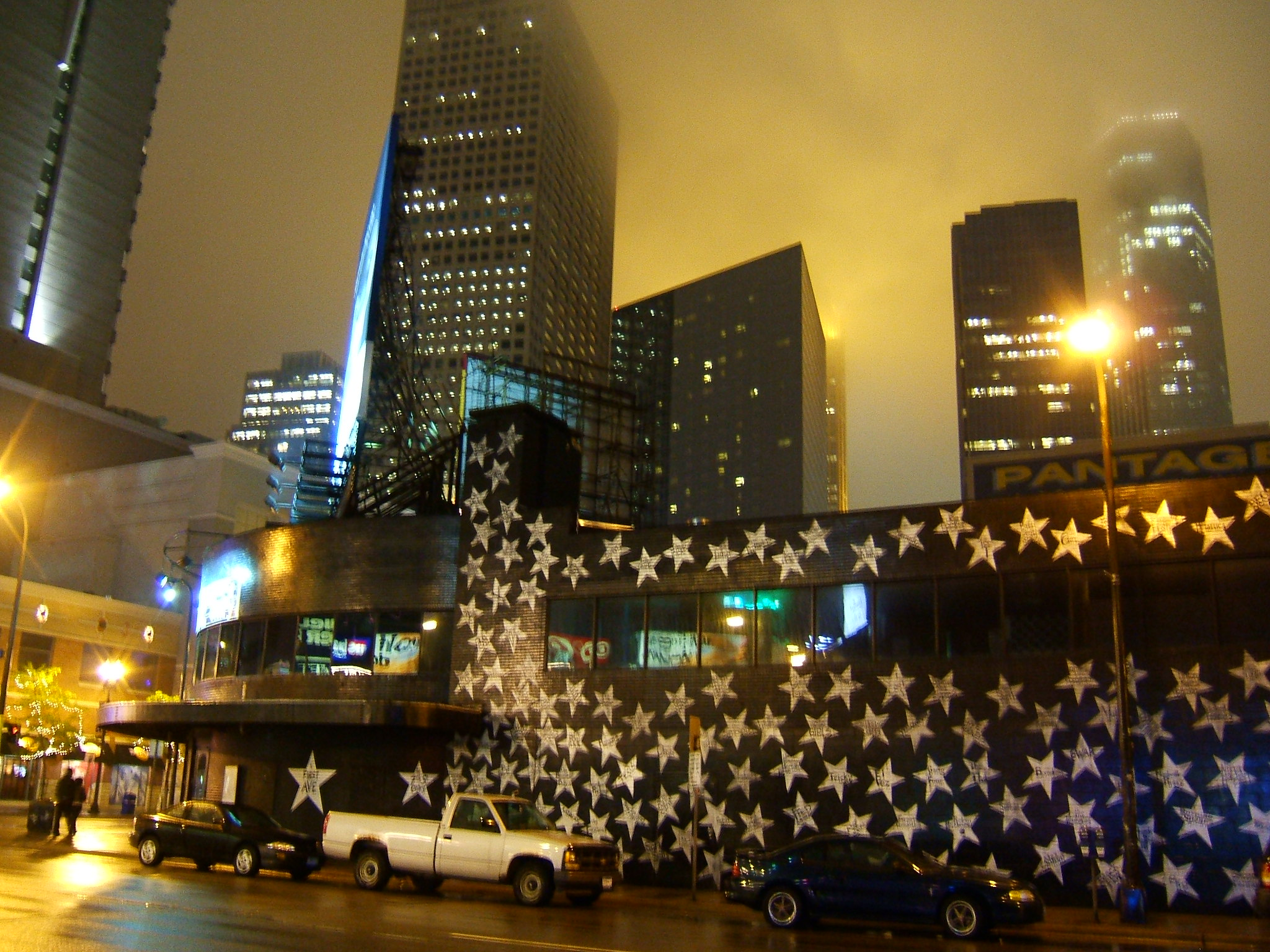
First Avenue

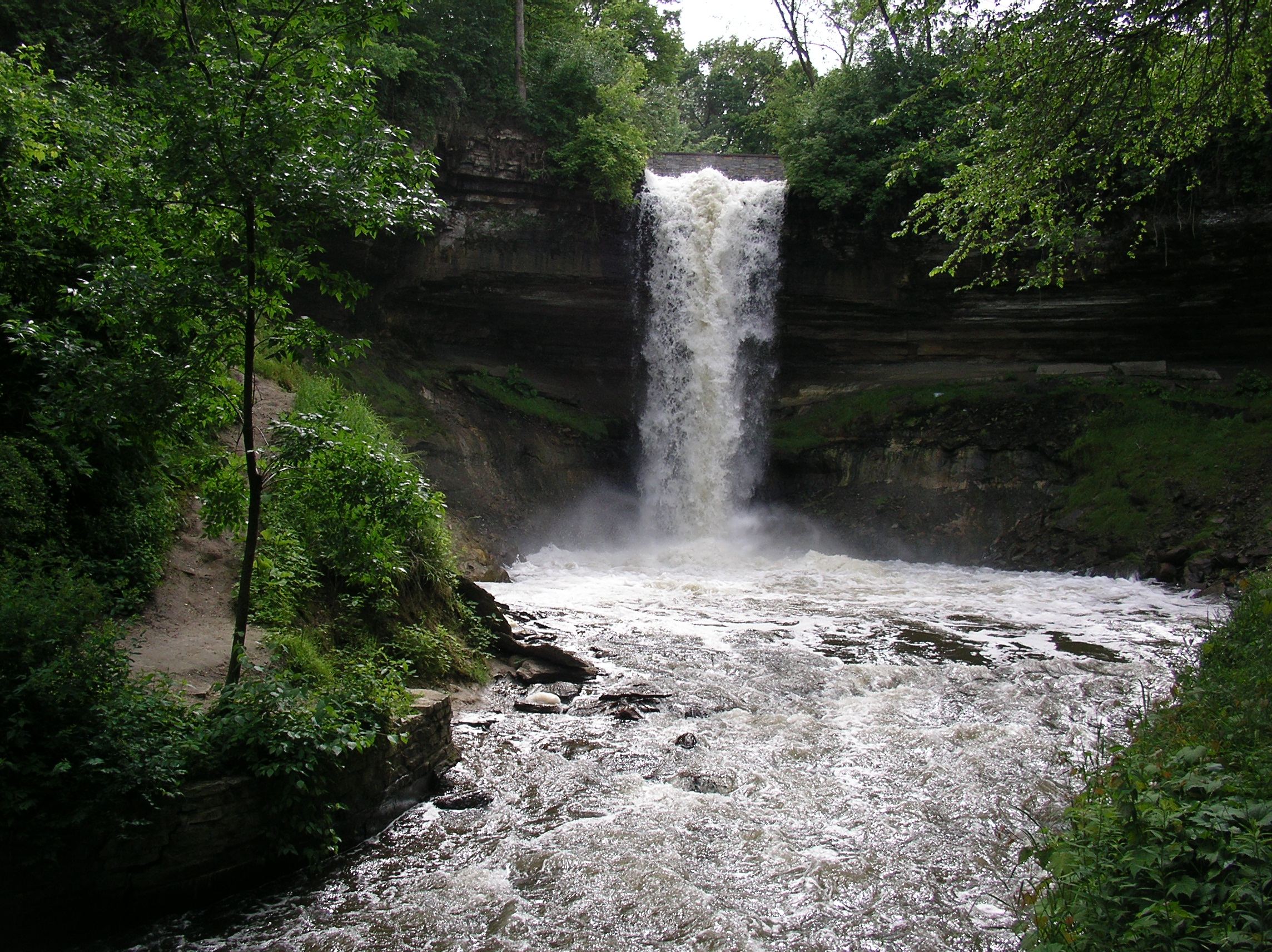
Minnehaha Falls

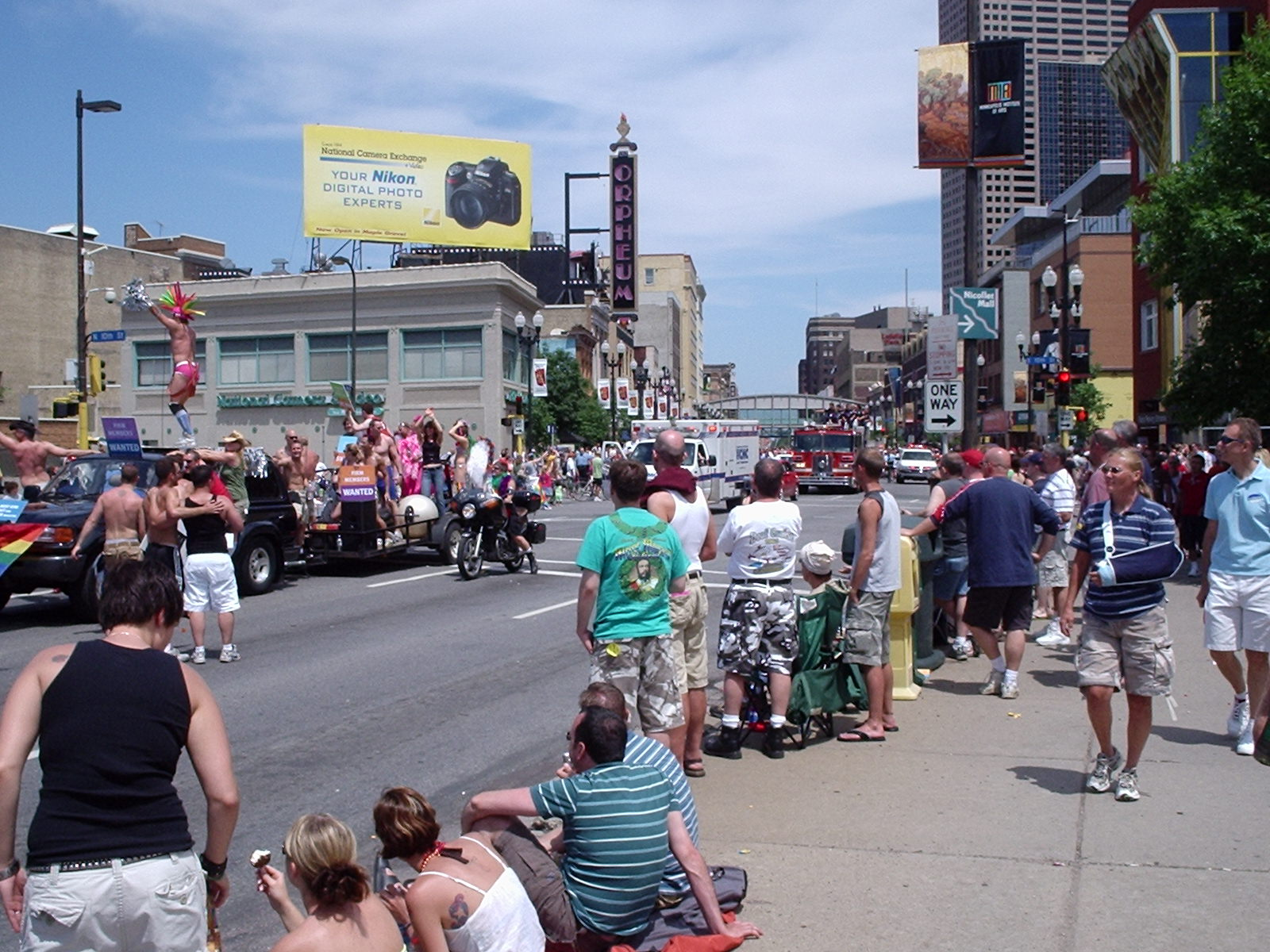
Ashley Rukes GLBT Pride Parade

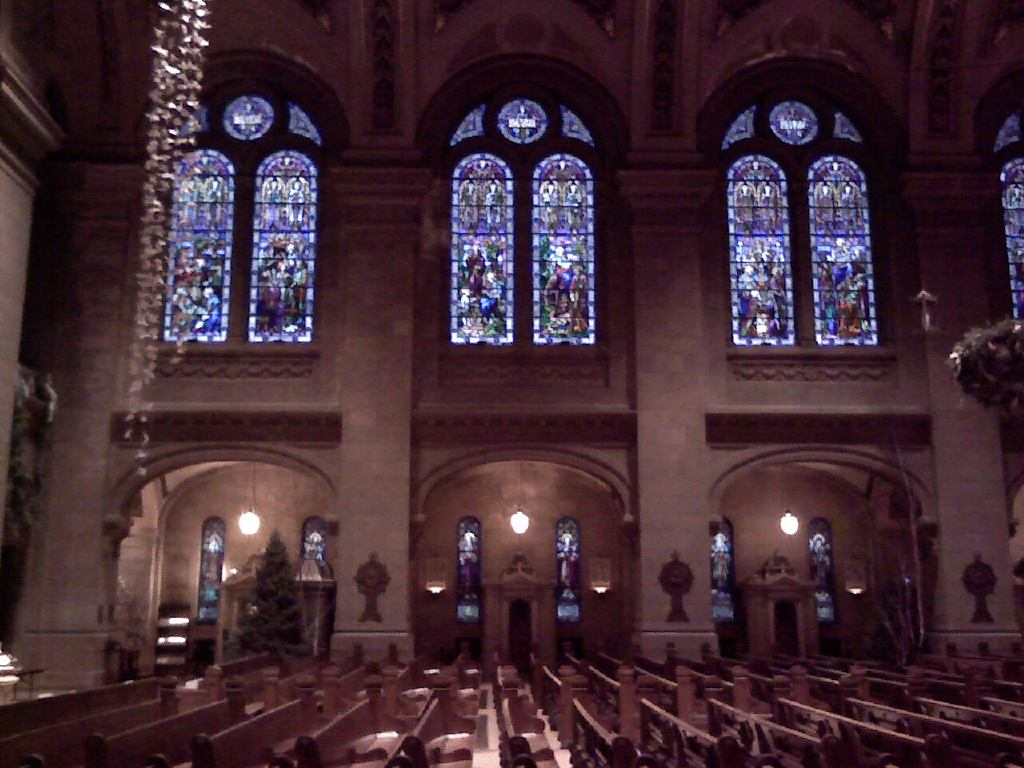
Basilica of Saint Mary

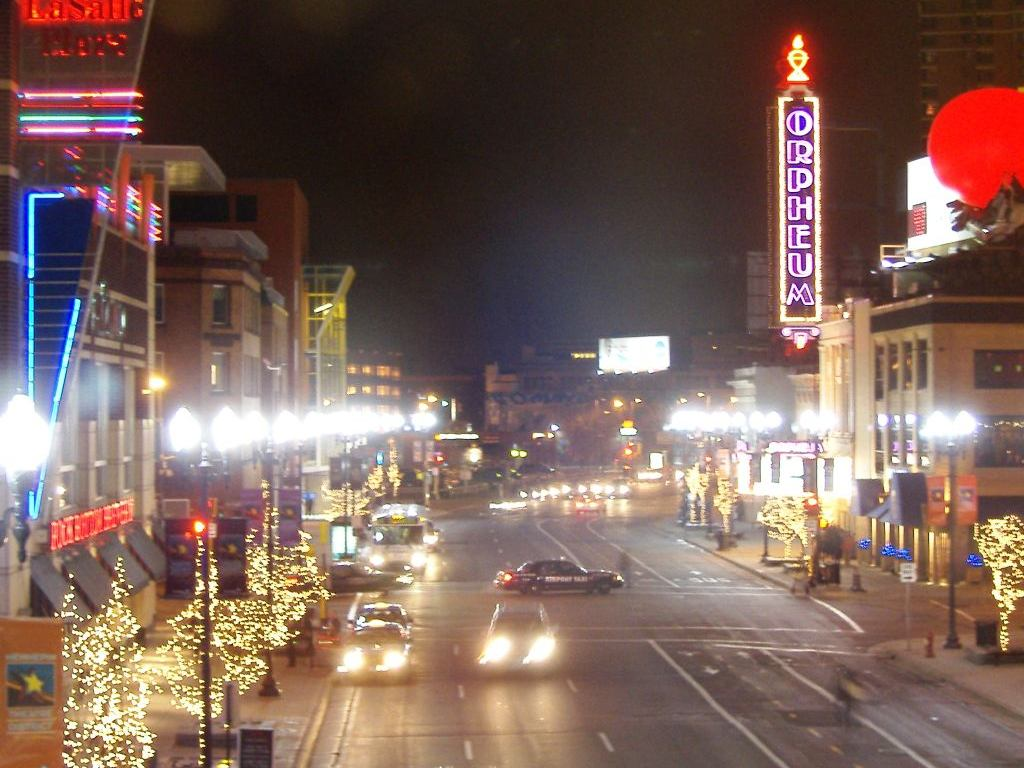
Hennepin Avenue

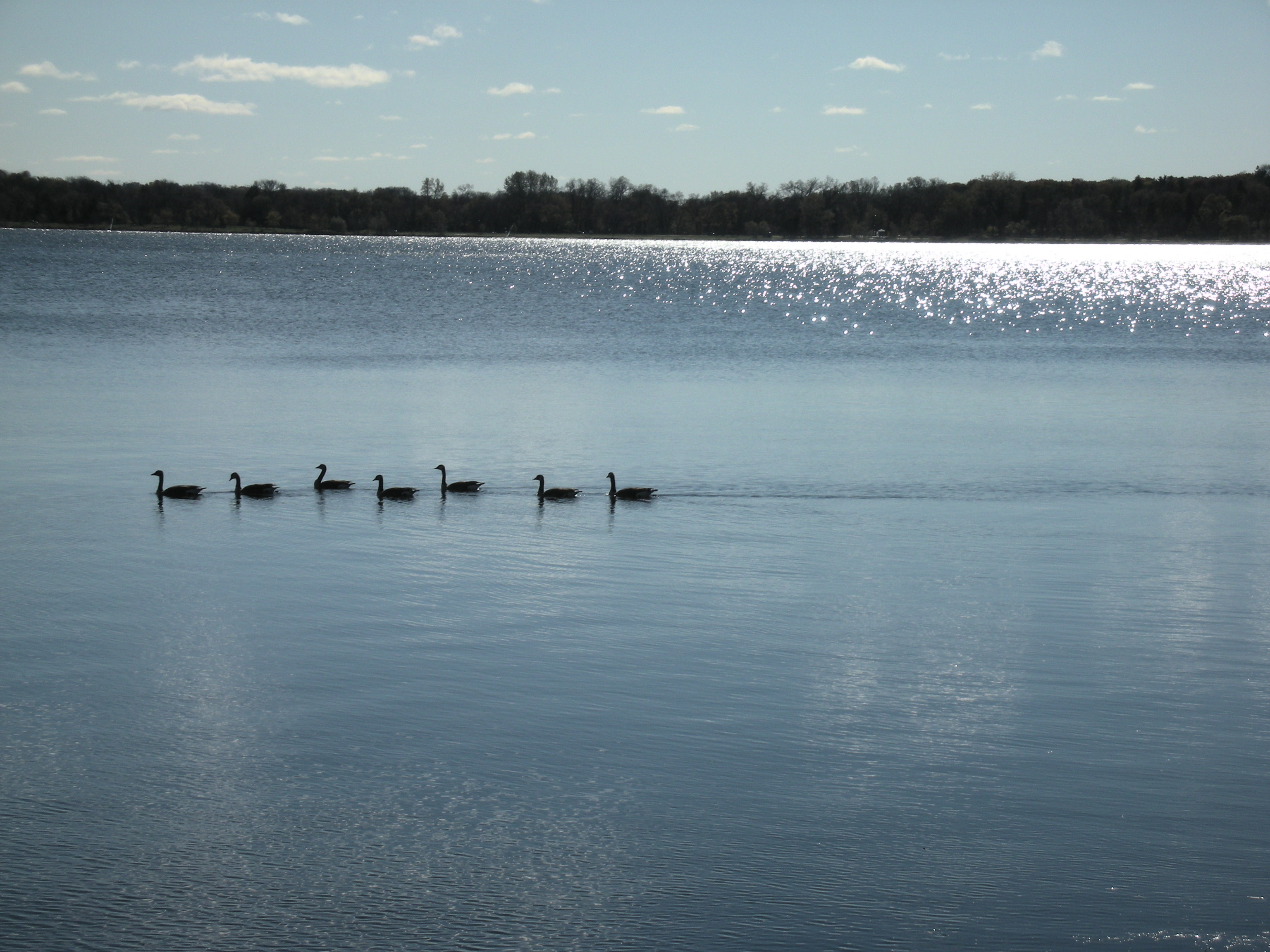
Chain of Lakes

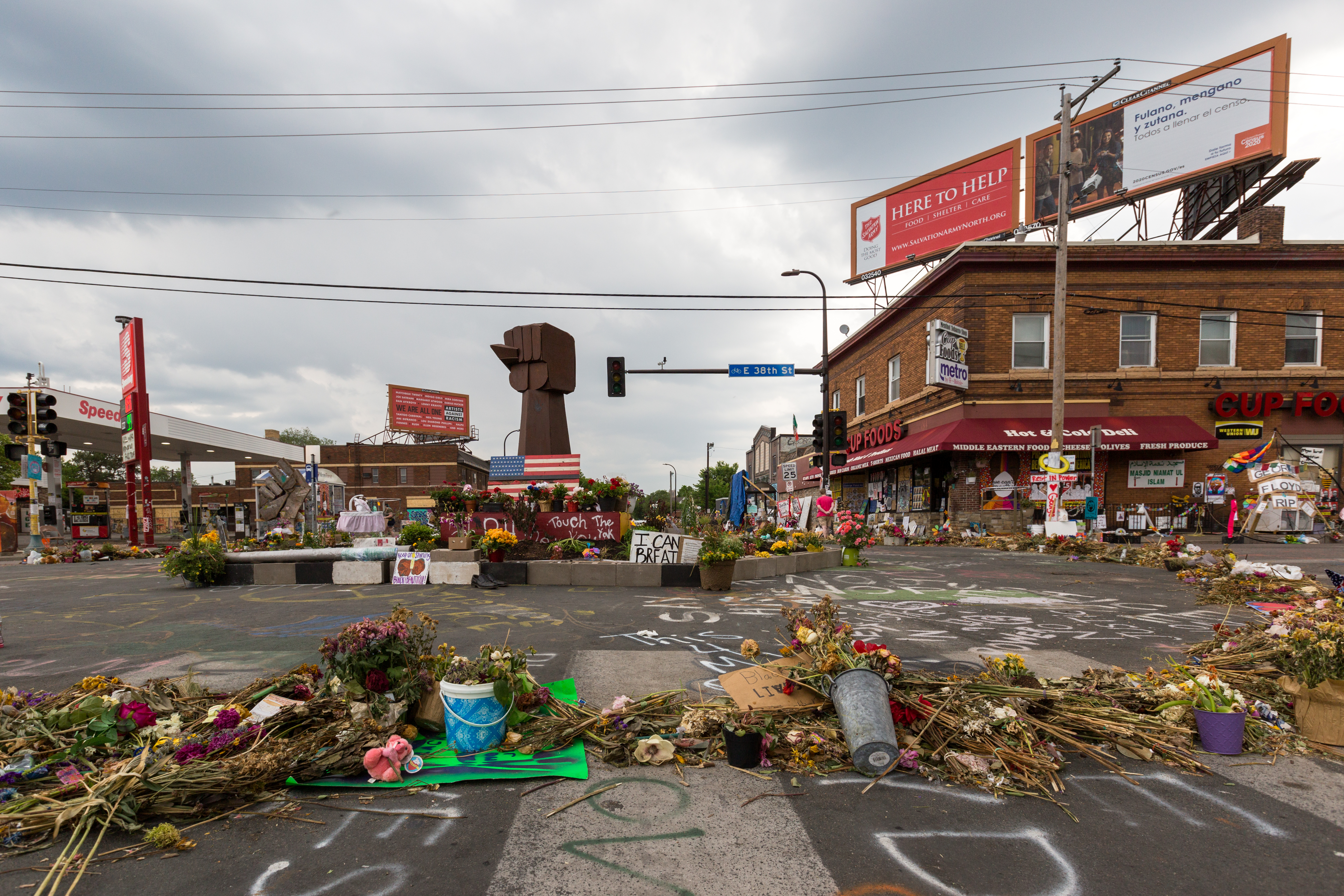
George Floyd memorial site
