= William L. Fambrough =

American photographer (1916–1983)

- Born: September 22, 1916; Little Rock, Arkansas, US
- Died: October 18, 1983 (aged 67); Kansas City, Missouri, US
- Education: Lincoln University (Jefferson City, Missouri)
- Known for: Photography

William Fambrough (1916–1983) was an American photographer who worked in Kansas City, where he documented African American life through his photographs for three decades.

== Biography ==
Fambrough was born in Little Rock, Arkansas, and moved with his family to Kansas City, Missouri, when he was young. After graduating from Lincoln High School in 1935, he studied graphic arts at Lincoln University and then served in World War II. After three years in the military, Fambrough returned to photography, working for the weekly magazine The Call and as a freelance photographer. From the 1950s to the 1970s, he captured images of the African American experience in Kansas City. Many of his photographs also appeared uncredited in The Kansas City Star. Fambrough came to be known by his nickname “One Shot Fambrough.”
