= Central (neighborhood), Minneapolis =

Coordinates: 44.9415°N 93.2709°W

Central
- Neighborhood
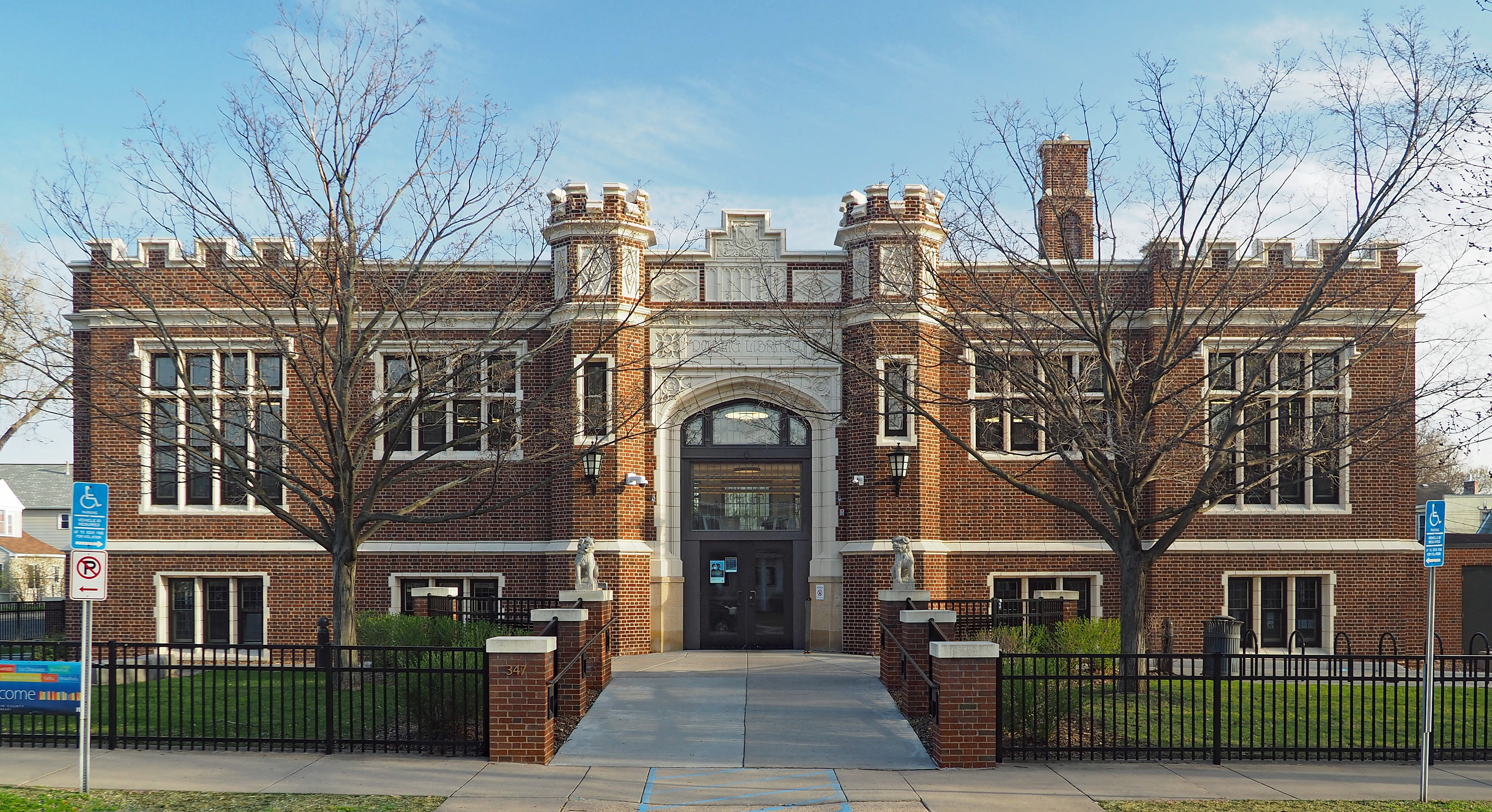
- Hosmer Library, built in 1916

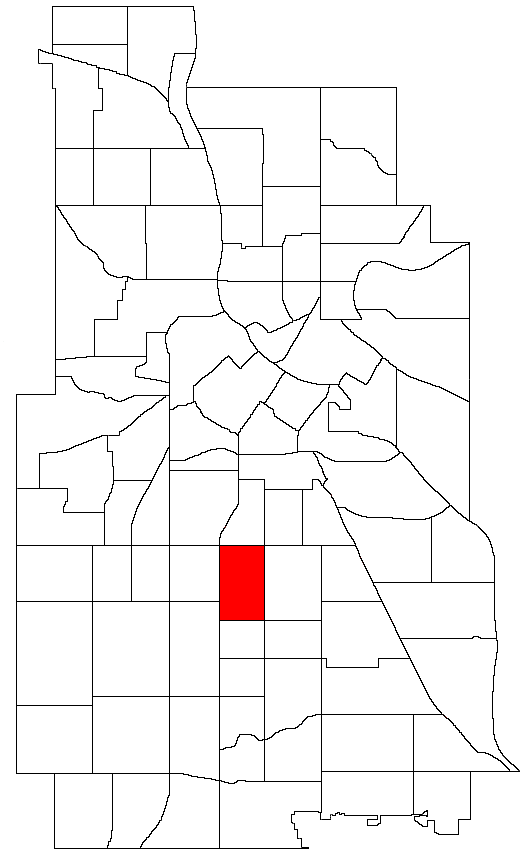
- Location of Central within the U.S. city of Minneapolis
- Interactive map of Central
- Country: United States
- State: Minnesota
- County: Hennepin
- City: Minneapolis
- Community: Powderhorn
- Founded: 1849
- City Council wards: 8, 9

Government
  - Council Member: Soren Stevenson
  - Council Member: Jason Chavez

Area
  - Total: 0.582 sq mi (1.51 km^{2})

Population (2020)
  - Total: 8,132
  - Density: 14,000/sq mi (5,390/km^{2})
- Time zone: UTC-6 (CST)
  - Summer (DST): UTC-5 (CDT)
- ZIP code: 55407, 55408, 55409
- Area code: 612

Historical population
Census	Pop.	Note	%±
1980	7,147		—
1990	7,521		5.2%
2000	8,150		8.4%
2010	8,307		1.9%
2020	8,132		−2.1%

The Central neighborhood (part of the larger Powderhorn community) of Minneapolis, Minnesota, United States is located south of the downtown region of the city. It is bounded by Lake Street on the north, Chicago Avenue on the east, 38th Street on the south, and Interstate 35W on the west. It should not be confused with the Central community, which covers Downtown and some surrounding neighborhoods.

Central is split between two city council wards along Portland Avenue and 36th Street. The western portion is in Ward 8, while the eastern portion is in Ward 9. It also split between and legislative districts 62A and 62B.

Developed mostly between 1900 and 1930, the Central neighborhood is racially diverse and has drawn African-American residents since the 1920s. Until it was closed in 1982 and later razed, Central High School was located here (Prince graduated from Central in 1976).

== Demographics ==
In 2010, the population of the neighborhood was 8,307. The neighborhood was 21.1% White, 25.1% Black or African American, 2.2% American Indian or Alaska Native, 3.6% Asian or Pacific Islander, 44.3% Hispanic or Latino, 3.4% two or more races, and 0.2% other race. The percentage of households with children was higher than the city average, and the percentage of single households was lower than the city average. The median household income was $36,988, which was $8,637 lower than the city average.

Race/ethnicity
Race/ethnicity	2000		2010		2020	
Race/ethnicity	Number	%	Number	%	Number	%
White alone	1,578	19.36	1,749	21.05	2,174	26.43
Black alone	3,264	40.05	2,088	25.14	2,010	24.43
Hispanic or Latino (any race)	1,899	23.30	3,682	44.32	3,186	38.73
Native American alone	166	2.04	184	2.21	105	1.28
Asian alone	741	9.09	301	3.62	265	3.22
Other race alone	42	0.52	15	0.18	59	0.72
Pacific Islander alone	1	0.01	2	0.02	3	0.04
Two or more races	459	5.63	286	3.44	424	5.15
Total	8,150	100.0	8,307	100.0	8,226	100.0
