= Bancroft, Minneapolis =

Neighborhood of Minneapolis

Coordinates: 44.9292°N 93.2545°W

Bancroft
- Neighborhoods
- Bancroft Elementary School

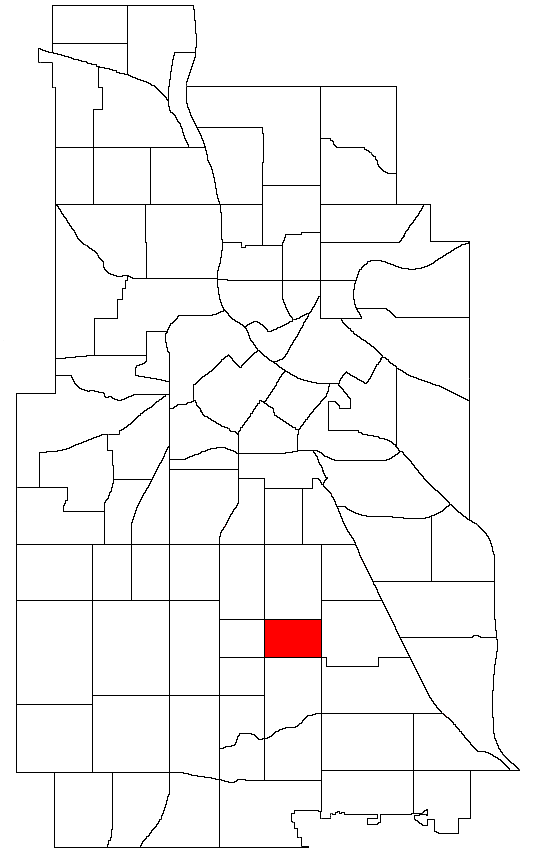
- Location of Bancroft within the U.S. city of Minneapolis
- Interactive map of Bancroft
- Country: United States
- State: Minnesota
- County: Hennepin
- City: Minneapolis
- Community: Powderhorn
- Founded: 1849
- City Council Ward: 8

Government
  - Council Member: Soren Stevenson

Area
  - Total: 0.369 sq mi (0.96 km^{2})

Population (2020)
  - Total: 3,397
  - Density: 9,210/sq mi (3,550/km^{2})
- Time zone: UTC-6 (CST)
  - Summer (DST): UTC-5 (CDT)
- ZIP code: 55407
- Area code: 612

Historical population
Census	Pop.	Note	%±
1980	5,620		—
1990	3,377		−39.9%
2000	3,606		6.8%
2010	3,371		−6.5%
2020	3,397		0.8%

Bancroft is a neighborhood within the Powderhorn community in Minneapolis, Minnesota, United States. Its boundaries are East 38th Street to the north, Chicago Avenue to the west, East 42nd Street to the south and Cedar Avenue to the east. It is entirely located within Minneapolis City Council ward 8 and legislative district 62B.

The neighborhood provides convenient access to downtown via Interstate 35W, the Hiawatha Corridor, and the airport and Bloomington area via Cedar Avenue. For residents who like recreation, Bancroft lies just blocks north of Lake Nokomis, the Hiawatha Golf Course and the scenic Minnehaha Creek.

Bancroft is a small but vibrant residential community consisting mostly of single-family dwellings built before 1940 that are owner-occupied. The neighborhood does have some commercial property along Bloomington Avenue and along 38th Street.

The Bancroft neighborhood is home to two schools- Bancroft Elementary School, a continuous progressive school, and the newly opened El Colegio/ CreArte center for the arts.

== History ==
The urban history of the Bancroft Neighborhood dates back to the early 1910s through the 1930s. More than 80% of the structures were built before 1940 and are today primarily owner-occupied. The neighborhood was named for Bancroft Elementary School, one of the oldest education buildings in the Minneapolis School District.

In the 1920s, Bancroft residents would hop on the Bloomington or Cedar Avenue street cars to go downtown or to work. Many neighbors would get visits from the Milkman, the Watkins Spice man, and the Fuller Brush man. Other shopping and business could be done right in the neighborhood. You could find a butcher, grocer, drug store, doctor's office and a nursery all within a few blocks. Organ grinders with monkeys would provide entertainment for local children along local streets. Children in the 1920s, same as children today, tore out of their homes to catch the ice cream man. In the winter and summer fun could be found at nearby Powderhorn Lake, Lakes Nokomis and Hiawatha.

In 1986, the city moved the northern boundary of the neighborhood from 36th Street to 38th Street, transferring 24 city blocks from Bancroft to the Powderhorn Park neighborhood. The significant population decline between 1980 and 1990 can mostly be attributed to this boundary change.

== Demographics ==
Race/ethnicity
Race/ethnicity	2000		2010		2020	
Race/ethnicity	Number	%	Number	%	Number	%
White alone	2,241	62.15	2,061	61.14	2,295	67.72
Black alone	559	15.50	543	16.11	313	9.24
Hispanic or Latino (any race)	366	10.15	407	12.07	338	9.97
Native American alone	52	1.44	89	2.64	66	1.95
Asian alone	170	4.71	115	3.41	114	3.36
Other race alone	26	0.72	14	0.42	22	0.65
Pacific Islander alone	3	0.08	0	0.00	2	0.06
Two or more races	189	5.24	142	4.21	239	7.05
Total	3,606	100.0	3,371	100.0	3,389	100.0
