= Minnesota Spokesman-Recorder =

Historic Black American newspaper

Coordinates: 44.934872°N 93.270480°W

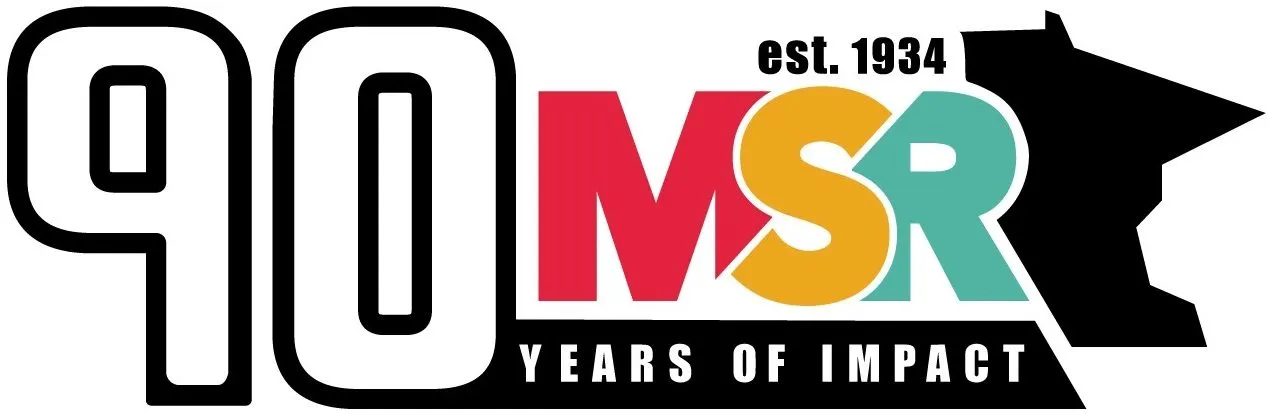
- Type: Weekly newspaper (Thursday)
- Owner: Tracey Williams-Dillard
- Founder: Cecil Newman
- Publisher: Tracey Williams-Dillard
- Founded: August 10, 1934; 91 years ago
- Language: American English
- Headquarters: 3744 Fourth Avenue South; Minneapolis, Minnesota 55409
- City: Minneapolis
- Country: United States
- Circulation: 9,800 (as of 2024)
- Readership: Twin Cities
- OCLC number: 43310423
- Website: spokesman-recorder.com

The Minnesota Spokesman–Recorder is an African-American, English-language newspaper headquartered in Minneapolis, Minnesota and serves readers in the Twin Cities. Founded in 1934 by Cecil Earle Newman (who remained editor until his death in 1976), it is the oldest continuously operated black newspaper and longest-lived black-owned business in Minnesota. The current Publisher & CEO of the paper is Newman's granddaughter, Tracey Williams-Dillard.

== History ==
The newspaper's first issue appeared on August 10, 1934, as the St. Paul Reporter. Until 2000, it released weekly alongside The Minnesota Spokesman-Recorder, also published and edited by Newman (until his death in 1976). The newspaper office moved from St. Paul to 3744 Fourth Avenue South, Minneapolis, in 1958. Under Newman's leadership, the newspaper played a key role in the civil rights movement in Minnesota.

After Newman's death in 1976, his wife Launa took over operation of the papers. In 2000, she merged them into a single title, the Minnesota Spokesman-Recorder. In 2007, Newman's granddaughter Tracey Williams-Dillard became CEO of the paper.

The late photographer, filmmaker, writer, and composer Gordon Parks was a photo-journalist for the newspaper.

The newspaper building on Fourth Avenue was declared a historic landmark in 2015 for its association with the civil rights movement in Minnesota.

The Minnesota Spokesman–Recorder is a member of the National Newspaper Association, Amalgamated Publishers, Inc., Metropolitan Economic Development Association, Minnesota Minority Media Coalition, and Minnesota Newspaper Association.

In 2021, the newspaper's archives from 1934 to 1964 were publicly digitized in collaboration with the National Endowment for the Humanities and the Minnesota Historical Society.

== See also ==
- 38th Street South
- History of Minneapolis
- Launa Q. Newman
