= Bryant, Minneapolis =

Bryant
- Neighborhood
- Phelps Field Park

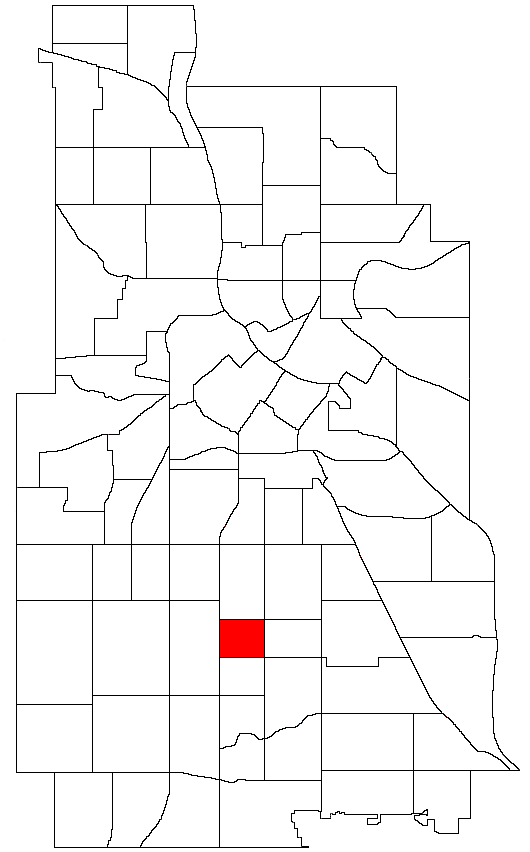
- Location of Bryant within the U.S. city of Minneapolis
- Interactive map of Bryant
- Country: United States
- State: Minnesota
- County: Hennepin
- City: Minneapolis
- Community: Powderhorn
- Founded: 1849
- City Council Ward: 8

Government
  - Council Member: Soren Stevenson

Area
  - Total: 0.298 sq mi (0.77 km^{2})

Population (2020)
  - Total: 2,877
  - Density: 9,650/sq mi (3,730/km^{2})
- Time zone: UTC-6 (CST)
  - Summer (DST): UTC-5 (CDT)
- ZIP code: 55407, 55409
- Area code: 612

Historical population
Census	Pop.	Note	%±
1980	2,695		—
1990	2,789		3.5%
2000	2,789		0.0%
2010	2,833		1.6%
2020	2,877		1.6%

Bryant is a neighborhood within the Powderhorn community in Minneapolis, Minnesota, United States. Its boundaries are East 38th Street to the north, Chicago Avenue to the east, East 42nd Street to the south, and Interstate 35W to the west. It is entirely located within Minneapolis City Council Ward 8 and legislative district 62B.

The neighborhood was named for William Cullen Bryant, an American poet who lived from 1794 to 1878.

The City of Minneapolis incorporated the neighborhood in 1887, and by 1930 it was fully developed. Today it is a residential neighborhood with mostly single-family dwellings. In 2000, is population was 2,789. Phelps Park, which is located within its boundaries, is home to a large Boys and Girls Club.

In 1997, Mixed Blood Theatre Company produced a play called In the Garden..., which was performed at Phelps Park. The play, written by local playwright Syl Jones, was based on interviews of neighborhood residents and was centered on the Bryant Unity Development Garden as a source of community restoration.

Notable residents include Andrea Jenkins.

== Demographics ==
Race/ethnicity
Race/ethnicity	2000		2010		2020	
Race/ethnicity	Number	%	Number	%	Number	%
White alone	576	20.65	853	30.11	1,094	38.48
Black alone	1,489	53.39	947	33.43	691	24.31
Hispanic or Latino (any race)	423	15.17	805	28.42	742	26.10
Native American alone	30	1.08	38	1.34	34	1.20
Asian alone	135	4.84	93	3.28	99	3.48
Other race alone	11	0.39	5	0.18	22	0.77
Pacific Islander alone	2	0.07	1	0.04	2	0.07
Two or more races	123	4.41	91	3.21	159	5.59
Total	2,789	100.0	2,833	100.0	2,843	100.0
