= Killing of Fong Lee =

2006 killing by American police

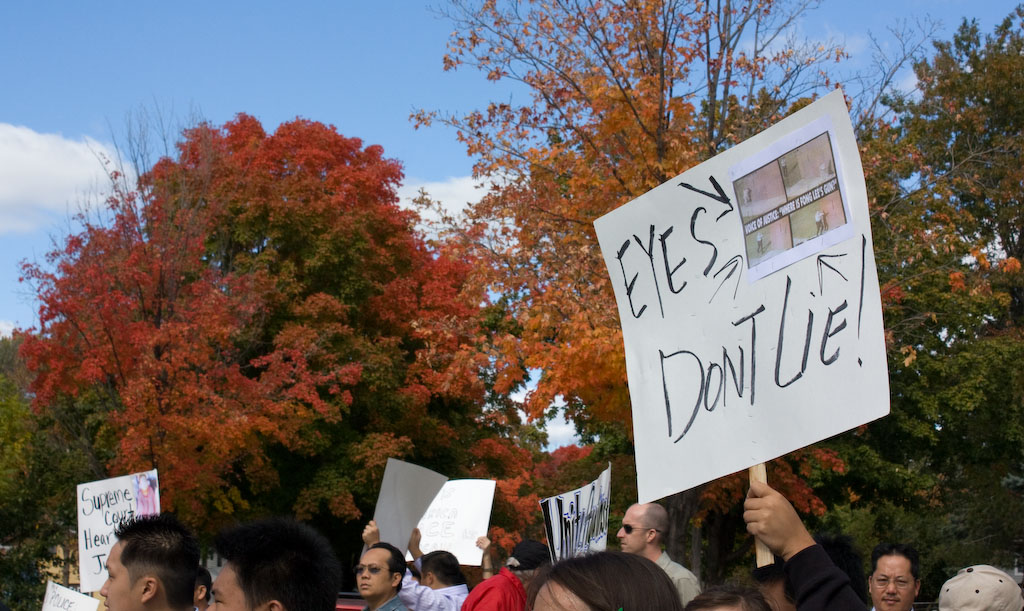
- A protest sign with a still image of the security footage when Andersen pursued Lee
- Date: July 22, 2006
- Time: About 7:00 p.m. (CDT)
- Location: Minneapolis, Minnesota, U.S.; 45.0160°N 93.2839°W
- Type: Police shooting
- Participants: Jason Andersen (shooter); Fong Lee (deceased)

On July 22, 2006, Minneapolis Police Department officer Jason Andersen shot Fong Lee—a 19-year-old Hmong American man—eight times (including four times in the back) while pursuing him for arrest. They killed him at the scene. The police pursuit and shooting occurred near Cityview school in the McKinley neighborhood of Minneapolis. In the shooting aftermath, Andersen was legally cleared of wrongdoing by an internal police department investigation and in state and federal legal cases. The United States Supreme Court in 2010 declined to take up an appeal of the federal case brought forward by Lee's family.

The manner of Lee's death and the legal case against Andersen generated public outcry, particularly among the Hmong American community in Minneapolis–Saint Paul. Concerns persisted about Andersen's use of deadly force and about the investigation of the incident. There were questions of potential evidence tampering. Public outcry over Lee's death was renewed more than a decade later during protests of racial injustice following the police murder of George Floyd in 2020.

== Shooting ==
=== People involved ===
Jason Andersen was a 32-year-old white officer with the Minneapolis Police Department. He was a member of the Metro Gang Strike Force.

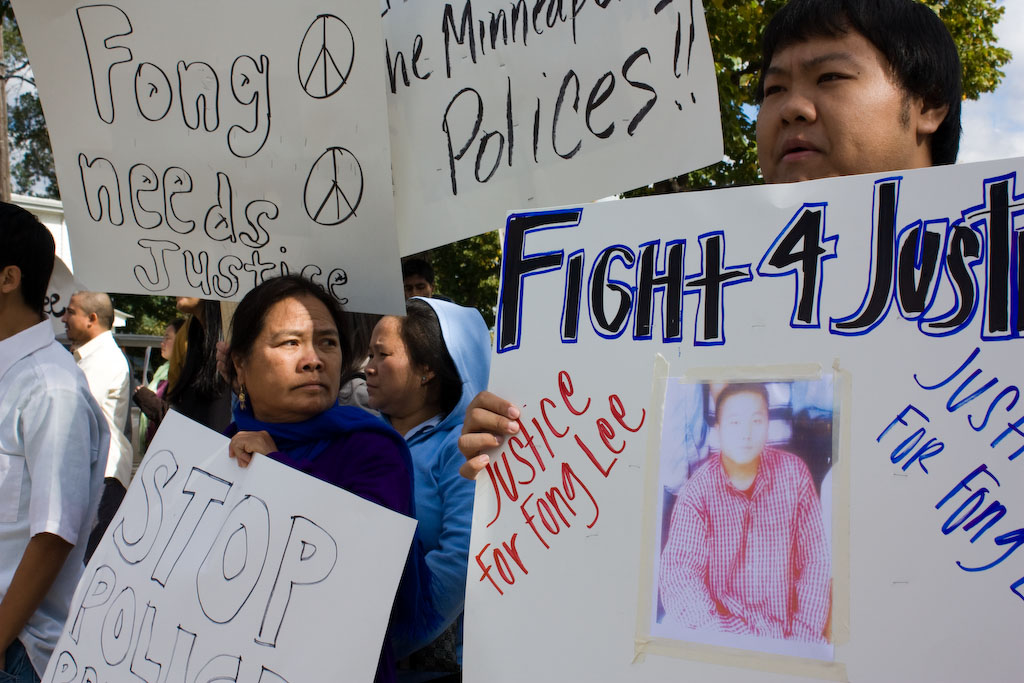
Photo of Lee on a protest sign

Fong Lee was a 19-year-old Hmong American man. Born in a refugee camp in Thailand in 1987, he moved with his family for resettlement in the United States when he was a child. They joined numerous Hmong in Minneapolis-Saint Paul, a destination for many of the refugees in the 1980s and 1990s. Many Hmong from Laos had assisted US and allied forces during the Vietnam War. They fled after the Communists came to power in Vietnam and Laos.

=== Incident ===
On July 22, 2006, just before 7:00 p.m. CDT, Fong Lee was riding his bicycle with four friends near Cityview school in north Minneapolis. A Minneapolis Police Department squad car containing Andersen and his partner drove alongside Lee as they were followed by a Minnesota State Patrol vehicle. Andersen claimed after the shooting that he observed another person on a bicycle hand a gun to Lee. The squad car began to pursue Lee, who dropped his bicycle and ran.

Andersen and a state trooper pursued Lee on foot with their guns drawn in an attempt to apprehend him. Andersen claimed Lee was armed and had turned toward him possibly to shoot; the officer fired his gun. Andersen's initial shot missed. Andersen continued to pursue Lee, and struck him three times in the back as he ran away. Lee fell to the ground, and Andersen claimed Lee raised his arm holding a gun. The officer fired five additional times, striking Lee with a total of eight rounds of gunfire. Lee died at the scene.

== Investigation ==
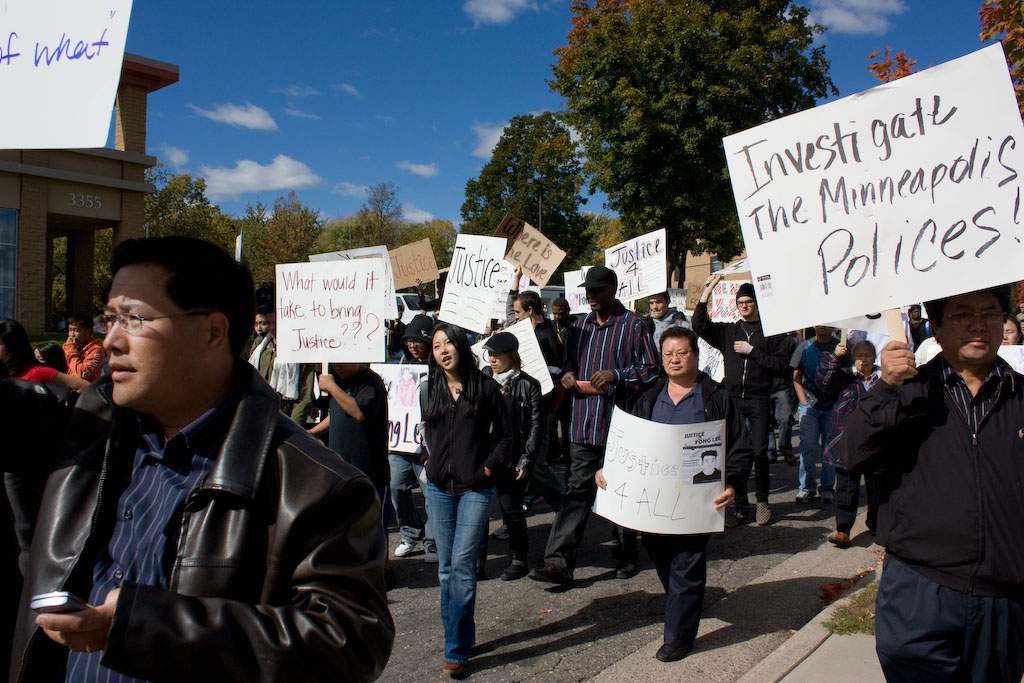
Protester of Lee's death on October 2, 2010 call for an investigation of the Minneapolis Police Department

Part of the incident was captured by security camera footage at the school, but not the actual shooting. The blurry footage captured Lee running away from Andersen, but it was unclear from the footage if Lee was carrying a gun in his hand as he ran. A .380-caliber, semi-automatic handgun was found next to Lee's body. The gun lacked any fingerprints or smudges.

Family members of Lee disputed the police account and said that Lee was unarmed; they questioned if the gun had been planted. On March 30, 2009, police documents suggested the gun had been held in police possession since 2004, when police recovered the weapon after it was reported stolen. Lee family attorney Mike Padden stated that the first police officer to arrive after the shooting was Minneapolis police officer Bruce Johnson, who two years before had written up the burglary report on this same gun. Minneapolis Police Chief Tim Dolan denied the accusation, and said that the gun recovered next to Lee's body had never been held in police custody.

Andersen was placed on administrative leave by the police department, but was reinstated two days after the shooting. Minneapolis homicide detectives and an internal police investigation later determined Andersen had acted in accordance with the department's guidelines.

== Legal proceedings ==
In their decision given on July 28, 2007, a grand jury declined to indict Andersen on criminal charges under Minnesota Statutes. Hmong community activists filed a complaint with the Minnesota Department of Civil Rights, but the case was not investigated. The matter was closed without further action.

Lee's family sought judicial action in federal court. The federal case, which was presided over by Judge Paul A. Magnuson, considered if Andersen's use of force was excessive and if his actions were malicious and should therefore result in compensatory damages. The police testified at trial that the stolen gun recovered in 2004 was not the same gun in Lee's possession the day of the July 22, 2006 shooting. They said that there had been a mix-up in the identification and paperwork, and that Lee's gun had not been in police custody prior to Andersen's fatally shooting Lee. On May 27, 2009, a federal jury, which did not have any racial minority representation, decided against the family of Lee and ruled that Andersen's use of force was lawful.

The family of Lee appealed the federal case to the 8th Circuit Court of Appeals, which upheld the jury's verdict in a ruling in August 2010. The Supreme Court of the United States declined to hear the case in December 2010. This resulted in the lower court ruling standing.

== Aftermath ==
=== Jason Andersen ===
Andersen received a Medal of Valor, the police department's second-highest honor, in 2008. In July 2009, Andersen was placed on administrative leave by the police department after allegations of domestic violence. He was fired by the department in September 2009 after an internal investigation. In 2010, Andersen was charged, but acquitted at trial, of a federal civil rights charge for allegedly kicking a Black teenager in the head during a 2006 arrest incident. By 2020, Andersen was employed by the Minneapolis Police Department as a chaplain coordinator.

=== Protests ===
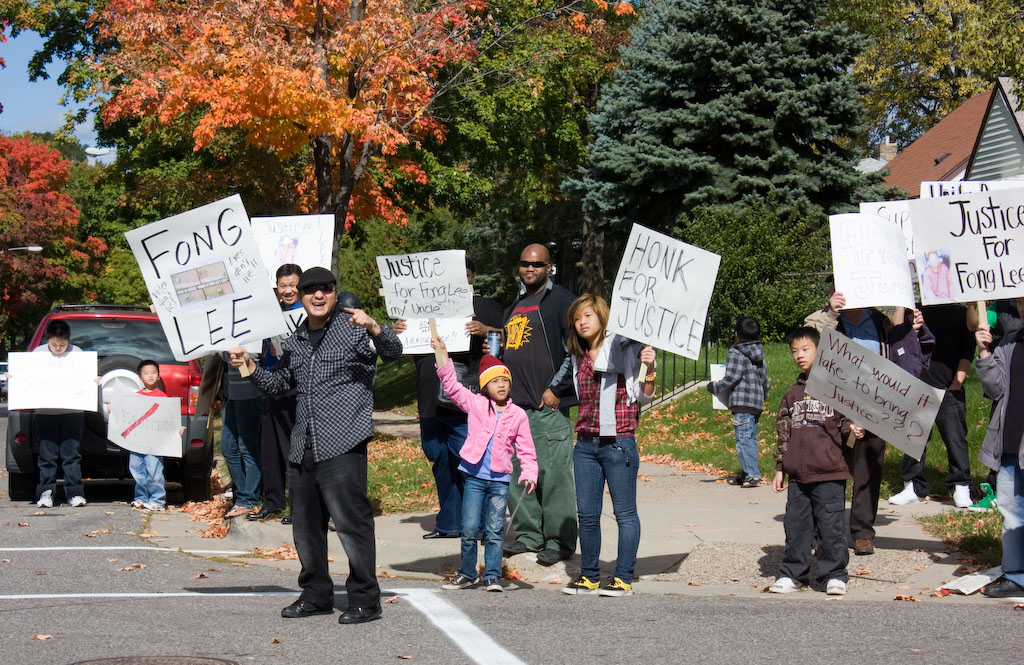
"Justice for Fong Lee" rally in Minneapolis, October 2, 2010, near Cityview school

The shooting created tension between the Hmong American community in Minneapolis and the police department, with community concerns raised of racial bias in policing. A 150-person protest over Lee's death was held at Minneapolis City Hall on July 26, 2006. Community activists called for an independent investigation at a rally on March 30, 2009. A protest over Lee's death was held in north Minneapolis on October 2, 2010.

Controversy about Lee's death was renewed during protests over the police murder of George Floyd in 2020. He was an unarmed man.

During racial unrest in 2020-2023 Minneapolis-Saint Paul, Lee's family and Hmong American activists joined those of the Black Lives Matter movement in protesting against police brutality. In 2021, demonstrators placed a memorial for Lee at the protest at what became known as George Floyd Square.

== See also ==
- History of the Hmong in Minneapolis–Saint Paul
- List of killings by law enforcement officers in Minnesota
