= George Floyd Square occupied protest =

Civil conflict at the location of George Floyd's murder

- Part of George Floyd protests in Minneapolis–Saint Paul
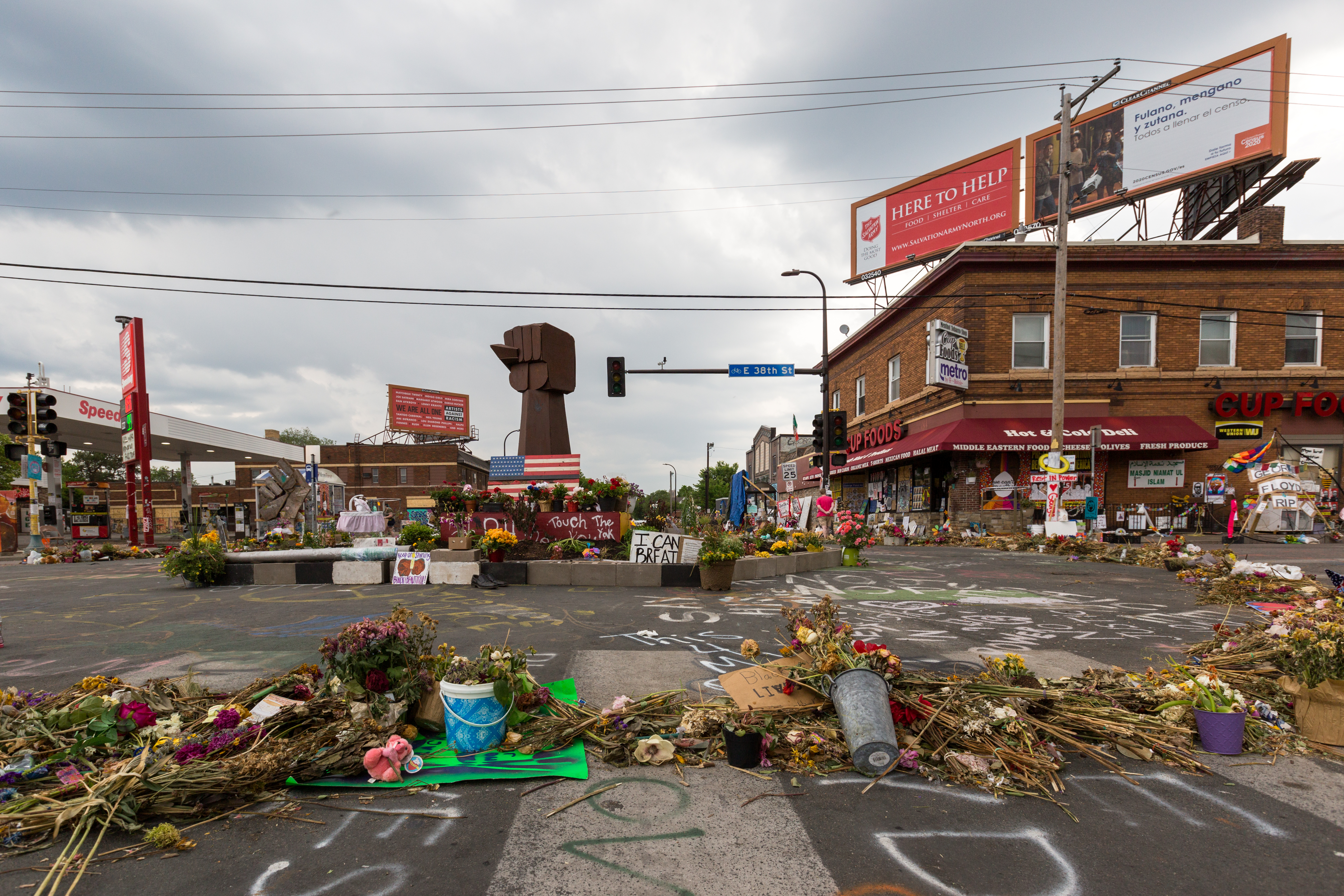
- George Floyd Square, June 2020
- Date: Street occupation: May 26, 2020 – June 20, 2021 (1 year, 3 weeks and 4 days) Protest activity: May 26, 2020 – May 2, 2023
- Location: Minneapolis, Minnesota, United States; 44.9343°N 93.2624°W
- Caused by: Murder of George Floyd; George Floyd protests in Minneapolis–Saint Paul
- Goals: List of 24 demands
- Methods: Protests and demonstrations; Occupation protest; Protest art; Police-free zone
- Status: Vehicular traffic resumed through the street intersection on June 20, 2021, but by mid-2024 the square area remained a gathering place for protest.

Parties
Meet on the Streets	City of Minneapolis

Casualties
- Deaths: 7 by gunfire 1 by drug overdose
- The center of the protest zone in Minneapolis.

As a reaction to the murder of George Floyd on May 25, 2020, racial justice activists and some residents of the Powderhorn community in Minneapolis staged an occupation protest at the intersection of East 38th Street and Chicago Avenue with a blockade of the streetway lasting over a year. The intersection is where Derek Chauvin, a white police officer with the Minneapolis Police Department, murdered George Floyd, an unarmed 46-year-old Black man. Activists erected barricades to block vehicular traffic and transformed the intersection and surrounding structures with rudimentary amenities, social services, and public art depicting Floyd and other racial justice themes. The community called the unofficial memorial and protest zone at the intersection "George Floyd Square". The controversial street occupation in 2020 and 2021 was described as an "autonomous zone" and a "no-go" place for police, but local officials disputed the extent of such characterizations.

Local unrest in Minneapolis–Saint Paul immediately after Floyd's murder was the second-most destructive to property in U.S. history, after the 1992 Los Angeles riots, but peaceful protest gatherings at the intersection in late May 2020 were free of the property destruction, arson, and looting that characterized other local demonstrations. The intersection became a place of pilgrimage for people protesting Floyd's murder and other forms of racial injustice. But in the weeks and months after Floyd's murder, the neighborhood surrounding the square, which had previously had a reputation for gang activity, continued to have elevated levels of violent crime and regular gunfire incidents. By August 14, 2022, seven people had been killed by gun violence at or around the square since Floyd's murder, and one person had died there as the result of a drug overdose.

The City of Minneapolis began long-term planning in late 2020 for preservation of public art installments at the square. By March 2021, debate about how to open the intersection persisted as the trial of Derek Chauvin commenced, with some residents expressing support for removing the barricades and others preferring that the occupation continue until community demands were met. After a guilty verdict was reached in the trial on April 20, 2021, organizers of the occupation of the intersection said they would continue to protest and hold the square until their demands were met, which included awaiting the trial outcome for the other three police officers at the scene of Floyd's murder. City crews removed cement barricades at the intersection on June 3, 2021, as part of a phased reopening process and vehicular traffic partially resumed on June 20.

The activist movement at George Floyd Square persisted into 2024 as the area continued to function as a gathering place for protest.

== Background ==
=== 38th and Chicago ===
38th Street in Minneapolis has been the center of a Black business corridor and a destination for Black residents and visitors since the 1930s. East 38th Street, an east–west corridor, intersects Chicago Avenue, a north–south corridor, in the city's Powderhorn community.

=== Murder of George Floyd ===
At about 8 p.m. on May 25, 2020, George Floyd, a 46-year-old Black man, was murdered by Minneapolis police officer Derek Chauvin while being arrested outside the Cup Foods store at the intersection of East 38th Street and Chicago Avenue in the Powderhorn Park neighborhood. Chauvin knelt on Floyd's neck for approximately nine minutes after he was already handcuffed and lying face down and pleading for help. Two other police officers, J. Alexander Kueng and Thomas Lane, assisted Chauvin in restraining Floyd, while another, Tou Thao, prevented bystanders from interfering with Floyd's arrest. Bystanders confronted the officers over Floyd's repeated statement "I can't breathe" and deteriorating condition, but he appeared unconscious at the scene and was transported to Hennepin County Medical Center by ambulance. He was pronounced dead at 9:25 p.m. Two autopsy reports found Floyd's death to be a homicide.

=== Protest movement ===
Floyd's murder and local unrest in Minneapolis–Saint Paul resulted in worldwide protests against police brutality, police racism, and lack of police accountability.

== Timeline ==
=== 2020 ===
==== Protests at 38th and Chicago ====
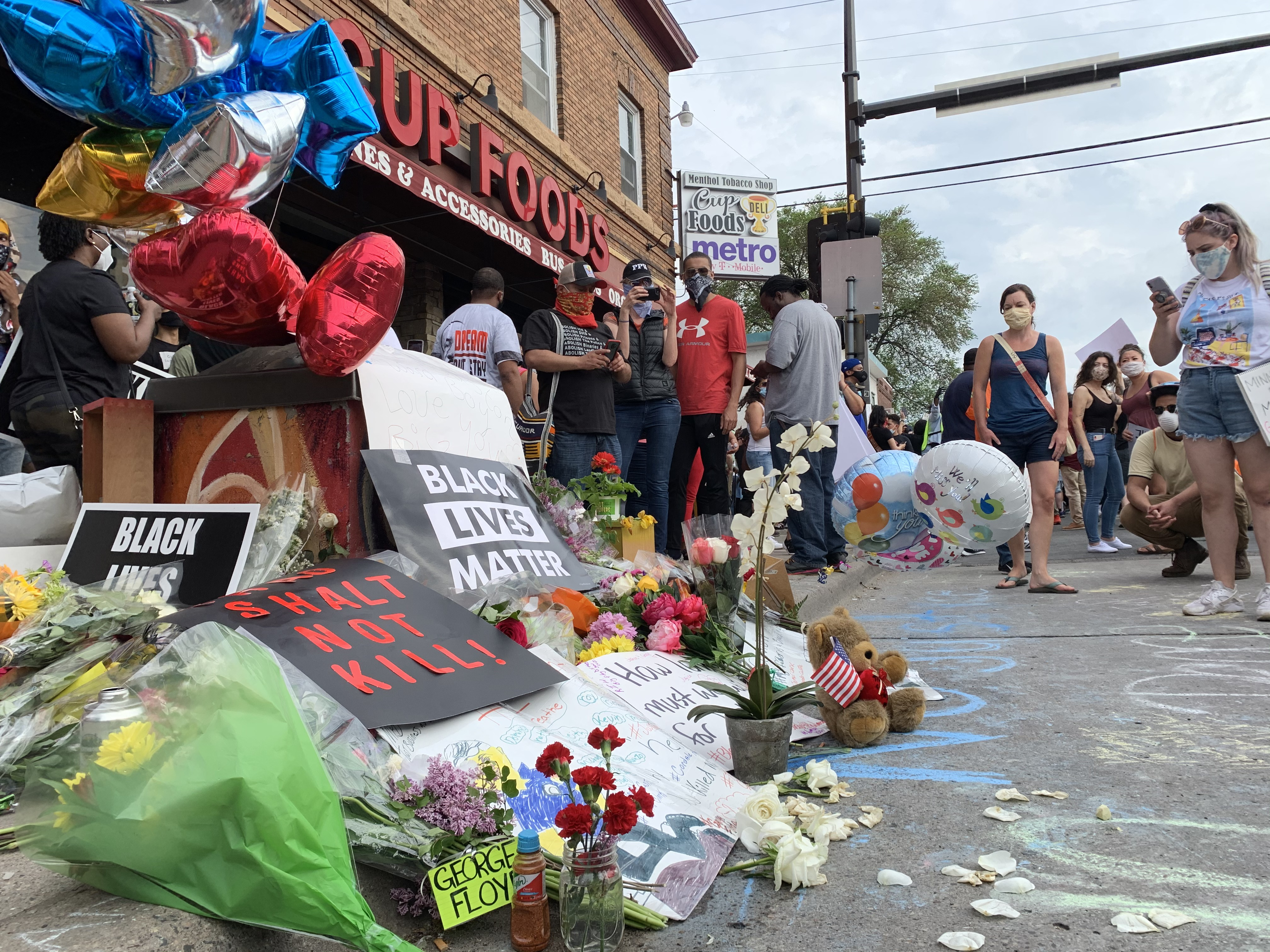
Protests and tributes outside Cup Foods, May 26, 2020.

On May 26, 2020, the day after Floyd's murder, several videos by witnesses and security camera footage of the incident circulated widely in the media, drawing public scrutiny. A makeshift memorial emerged at East 38th Street and Chicago Avenue and people gathered for the first organized protests. Some protesters chanted, "I can't breathe, I can't breathe", words repeated by Floyd in videos of his murder. Thousands of people flooded the intersection that day. By May 27, a group of protesters had blocked the intersection with a makeshift barrier as some repeated, "Whose streets? Our streets." People left memorials by Cup Foods and spray-painted the words "Justice for Floyd" and "Black Lives Matter" on the street surface. No police were present at the time and the protests there were described as peaceful.

==== Installation of barricades and public art ====
People who lived near the intersection put up makeshift barricades in response to police cars that were driving through the memorial site late at night. On June 2, the Minneapolis Public Works Department installed 12 concrete barricades at the various entrances to the square to ensure pedestrian safety as the intersection was host to many protest rallies. The city said the barricades made the square safer to gather in by preventing through-traffic and allowing emergency service access. Many visitors to the intersection left behind flowers by the murals and sculptures activists created to symbolize the Black Lives Matter movement. By mid-June, thousands of visitors had protested and grieved at the site, which was described as like a "shrine". On June 13, in a statement on Twitter, the Minneapolis police said they would "not be altering or decommissioning the memorial of George Floyd. We respect the memory of him and will not disrupt the meaningful artifacts that honor the importance of his life."

==== Fatal shooting of Dameon Chambers ====
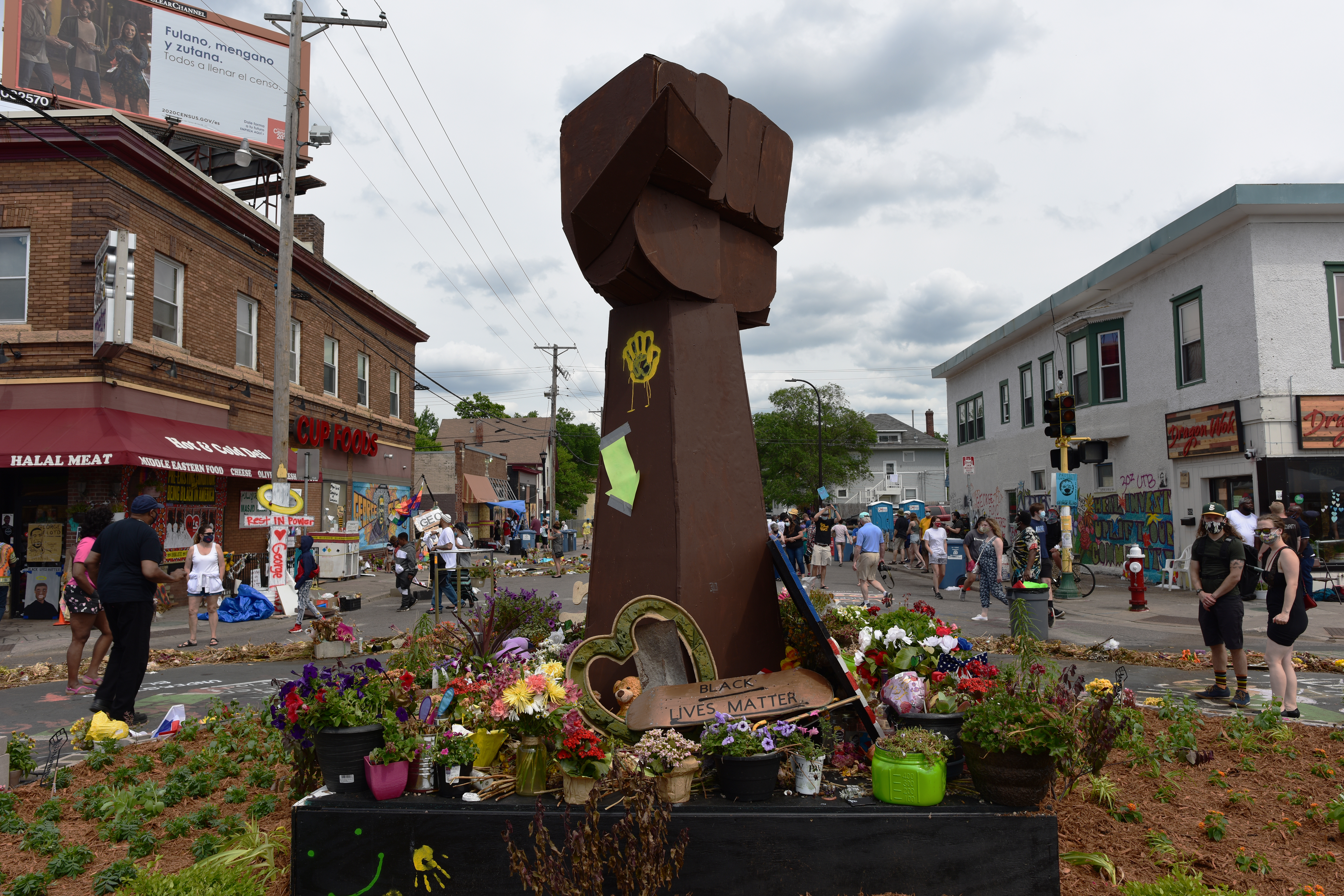
Juneteenth at George Floyd Square, June 19, 2020.

On June 19, Dameon Chambers was fatally shot at the square during a Juneteenth holiday gathering, which became a source of argument about the autonomous zone. A city document reported that emergency service workers were initially unable to reach Chambers to render aid and had to move him to an area where an ambulance could reach him. Activists at the square said the police delayed emergency workers.

==== Fatal shooting of Leneesha Columbus and her child ====
On July 5, police responded to reports of a shooting at the square. They initially asked whether community members could move a shooting victim out of the immediate area to a staging location they set up several blocks away, but were told that was not an option, so they responded at the scene and were aided by community members. Police found a vehicle that had been struck by gunfire a block away at East 37th Street and Elliot Avenue and bystanders who were rendering aid to a shooting victim. The victim, identified as Leneesha Columbus, a pregnant 27-year-old woman, died of gunshot wounds. The child she was carrying was delivered at a nearby hospital on July 5, about three months prematurely, and died on August 5. The baby's death was classified as a homicide. After the shooting, a volunteer peacekeeper at the square confronted the man who shot Columbus, and was shot in the foot by him. The Hennepin County Attorney's office later charged a 27-year-old man, believed to be the baby's father, with second-degree murder and other felonies in connection to the shootings on July 5. He was arrested in Illinois.

==== Carjacking and shooting ====
In mid-July, a Minneapolis man was shot 16 times during a carjacking incident near 37th Street and Elliot Avenue. An anonymous person called 911 to report the shooting, but police were not able to identify any witnesses. The man was left paralyzed. There were no developments in the case by mid-2022.

==== Cup Foods store reopens ====
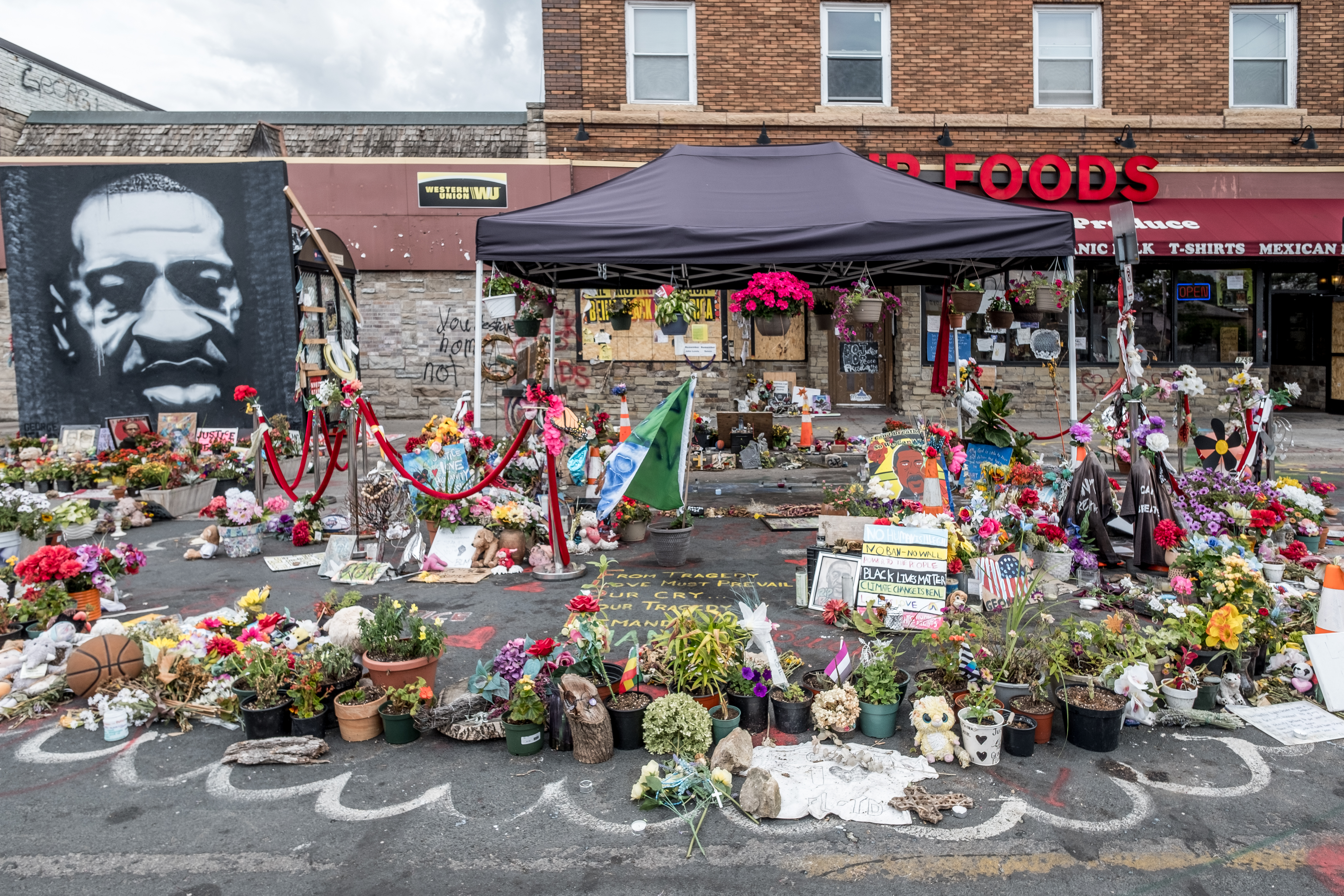
George Floyd Square and Cup Foods, August 5, 2020.

On August 3, the reopening of the Cup Foods convenience store, from which an employee's 911 call led to the encounter between Floyd and Minneapolis police, generated controversy. Cup Foods, owned by a Palestinian-American family, had been a fixture in the Powderhorn neighborhood for three decades. The area around it had also been the location of violent crime, illicit drug dealing, loitering, and undercover police surveillance since the 1990s. Floyd's murder led to further scrutiny of the store and its relationship with the Minneapolis police and its off-duty officers who were known to provide paid security services. When it reopened, some protesters demanded that the store remain closed for continued mourning and confronted its owners, who vowed to keep the store open. Among public conversation about how to evolve the intersection into a permanent memorial, some activists circulated petitions to permanently close the store.

==== Protesters present a list of 24 demands ====
On August 7, members of the community organization Meet on the Streets demanded that the city meet a list of 24 demands before removing cement barricades around the intersection. These included keeping the intersection closed to traffic until after the trials of the four officers involved in Floyd's murder, firing several specific employees from the Bureau of Criminal Apprehension, providing accountability in the cases of several officer involved deaths, investigating Dameon Chambers's death, and providing resources to the community and a handful of nonprofits operating in the community.

==== Official actions by the city ====
In August, the Minneapolis Planning Commission recommended to the city council that Chicago Avenue between 37th and 39th streets be named "George Perry Floyd Jr Place". Minneapolis city officials allocated $4.7 million to establish a permanent memorial at the site. As part of the Minneapolis 2040 zoning plan, local officials also designated the broader 38th Street South area as one of the city's seven new cultural districts to promote racial equity, preserve cultural identity, and promote economic growth. The officially designated 38th Street Cultural District included the portion of 38th Street South from Nicollet to Bloomington Avenues.

Violent crime, reports of drug overdoses by night, and disruption of public transit and business activity by day had city officials looking for ways to create a permanent memorial while also reopening the intersection to vehicular traffic. Conversations among area residents centered on anger about the police, the need to preserve a space for racial justice healing, and fears about safety. The city planned to reopen the intersection in August, but backed off the plans to avoid confrontation with protesters.

=== 2021 ===
==== City announces post-Chauvin trial plans ====
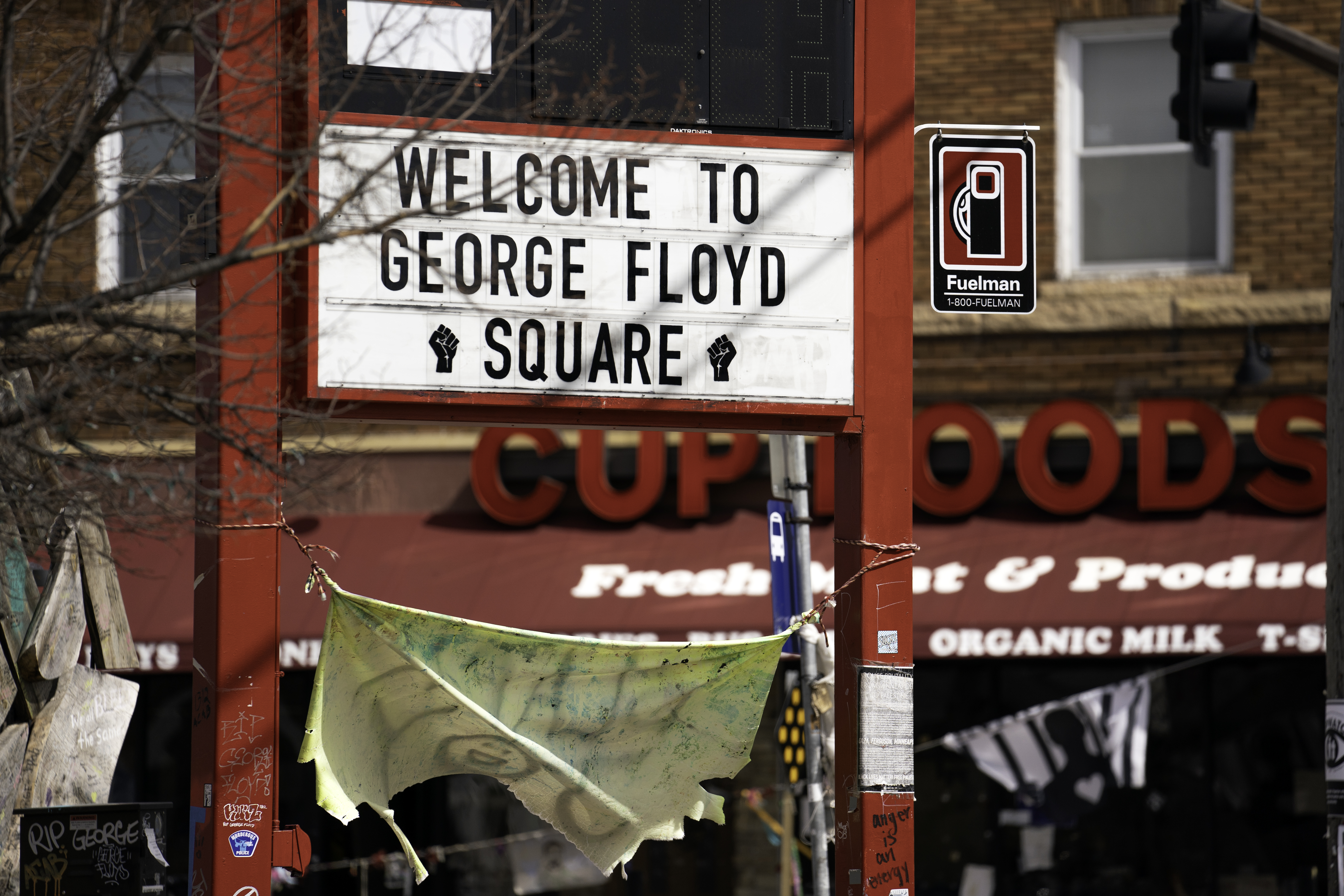
Sign at George Floyd Square, March 17, 2021.

On February 12, 2021, Minneapolis Mayor Jacob Frey and other city officials announced plans to reopen the intersection to vehicular traffic after the trial of former officer Derek Chauvin, scheduled for March 2021, concluded. Of Chauvin's trial, Frey said that the square "will be an important gathering spot during that time". He pledged that the intersection would never "return to normal" and that the legacy of the protest movement started by Floyd's murder would be recognized there permanently. The city had provided some services over the winter, such as snow and ice removal, but Frey said that police would begin to have a greater presence, though the barricades would remain.

A leader of the community organization Meet on the Street, which occupied the square, said Frey's announcement did not change anything. By early March, protesters insisted that the intersection remain closed until their 24 demands were met, and until after the conclusion of the trials of the other three police officers at the scene of Floyd's murder. Meanwhile, some Black small-business owners expressed their desire to reopen the intersection, as business activity had declined due to a combination of mitigation measures for the COVID-19 pandemic and safety concerns.

==== Fatal shooting of Imez Wright ====
On March 6, two people were shot outside Cup Foods, including Imez Wright (also reported as Imaz Wright), a 30-year old from Minneapolis, who later died of gunshot wounds.

Wright was allegedly shot by the 31-year-old Shantaello Christianson, and the incident was captured on surveillance video. Both Wright and Christianson were members of the Rolling 30s Bloods street gang, but were on opposite sides of an internal dispute. Wright was hanging out near Cup Foods on the evening of March 6 when he got into an argument with a relative of Christianson. Christianson then exited a nearby SUV and fired several shots at Wright, striking him in the chest with several shots and in the hand. Christianson then fled in his vehicle as bystanders returned gunfire at it.

At approximately 5:45 p.m., Minneapolis police responded to a ShotSpotter alert and 911 calls for gunfire heard near the intersection. The 911 callers said shooting victims were being carried to the barricaded perimeter of the autonomous zone, but no victims were there when police arrived. Wright, who had been taken to Hennepin County Medical Center, died later that evening. The other victim left the scene and was not found.

Wright grew up near the intersection. The neighborhood had a reputation for gang activity and violence. He had joined the Rolling 30s Bloods street gang at some point and had several criminal cases against him, including 2012 convictions for domestic abuse and drug possession. In the years before his death, Wright's friends said that he was making changes to his life and helping keep at-risk teens away from drugs and gangs. He had worked in the youth and family engagement division of Change, Inc., a local organization, and mentored Black teens in nearby Saint Paul. He was training to be a mental health practitioner.

By March, Wright was employed by the Agape movement, a community organization that employed ex-gang members and was under a city contract to keep watch over the square and surrounding neighborhood. According to colleagues, Wright was conducting outreach at the 38th Street and Chicago Avenue area when he was shot. A small memorial was left for Wright outside the Cup Foods entrance, steps away from where Floyd was murdered.

Christianson and his wife were arrested on March 10 at a Brooklyn Center hotel and found in possession of firearms. On March 15, Christianson was charged with second-degree murder, first-degree riot, and illegal firearm possession in connection to the March 6 shooting, and was held in jail on a $1 million bond. On October 4, he pleaded guilty to first-degree manslaughter and illegal firearm possession in connection with Wright's death.

==== Temporary closure amongst increased tension ====
On March 8, in response to Wright's death and elevated tensions in the area as Chauvin's trial began, the Agape Movement, a peacekeeping group that had a contract with the city to patrol the Central neighborhood, closed the square to gatherings. On March 9, while filming a segment just outside the barricaded area, two people from the square ordered a crew from the television station NewsNation to leave. One person who approached the crew said: "You’re going to be in a bad situation in a second. You’re being called out for what you are. You need to get out of here."

At a March 11 news conference, city officials condemned recent violence in the area and said they were having daily conversations with the community about how to reopen the intersection. Mayor Frey said: "This is an area that has two truths associated with it. There are portions that you’ve seen there are certainly times that it’s a beautiful community gathering space and I think that needs to be honored and respected. And there have been times where it has been absolutely unsafe."

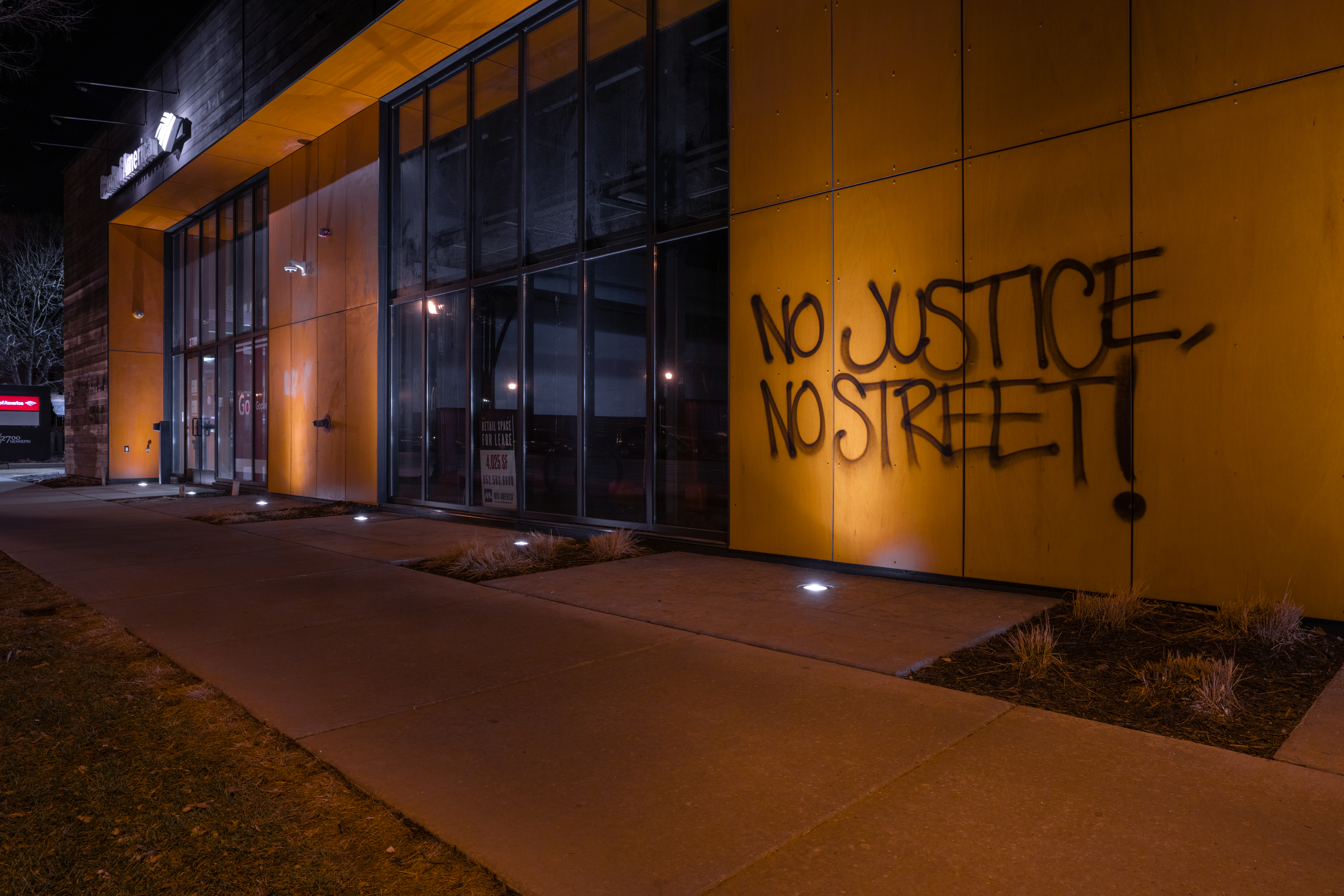
Graffiti in Uptown, Minneapolis, referencing the square, March 18, 2021.

On March 13, three people were arrested at East 38th Street and Elliot Avenue, a few blocks from the square. Earlier, they had shot at a business near East Franklin Avenue and Chicago Avenue and fled, followed by police. At one point, they passed through the intersection of the memorial with five police cars in pursuit. Their vehicle was stopped at East 38th Street and Elliot Avenue. A still shot from a bystander's video captured the driver smiling as he was pursued by police through the square. Rumors on social media were that the event was staged, which the Minneapolis police denied.

On March 17, in response to escalating violence in the area, the city said that reopening the intersection would depend on the completion of Chauvin's trial, and that it could come sooner, but provided no specific timeline. Minneapolis Police Chief Medaria Arradondo said police would begin having a greater presence near the intersection. The city also announced a partnership with other law enforcement agencies—including the field divisions for the U.S. Attorney's Office, the Federal Bureau of Investigation and the Alcohol Tobacco Firearms—to bring charges against people committing crimes.

On March 28, the day before opening statements in Chauvin's trial, a group of self-identified "anarchists" and "anti-fascists" held a training workshop at the square on how to avoid arrest and keep calm if detained by police. Protesters claimed the intersection was not public property and demanded that journalists leave the area before the workshop began. By late March, some residents, particularly older people, expressed a desire for city services and police patrols to resume at the square. Other residents felt it was important for the community to continue to hold the square.

==== The city presents permanent design options ====
In February 2021, the city presented the community with two options to create a permanent memorial at the square, one preserving the roundabout and fist sculpture in the middle of the intersection and another that relocated it to the northeast corner of 38th and Chicago. The survey's results, released in late March, found that 81% of resident respondents preferred one of those options, and 16% wrote in that they wanted "justice" before the city made any changes. Protesters at the square objected to the survey and tweeted, "This is weaponized study design and weaponized data at work." Some activists holding the square worried that reopening the intersection would reduce focus on Floyd and police brutality.

==== Return of rallies and gatherings ====
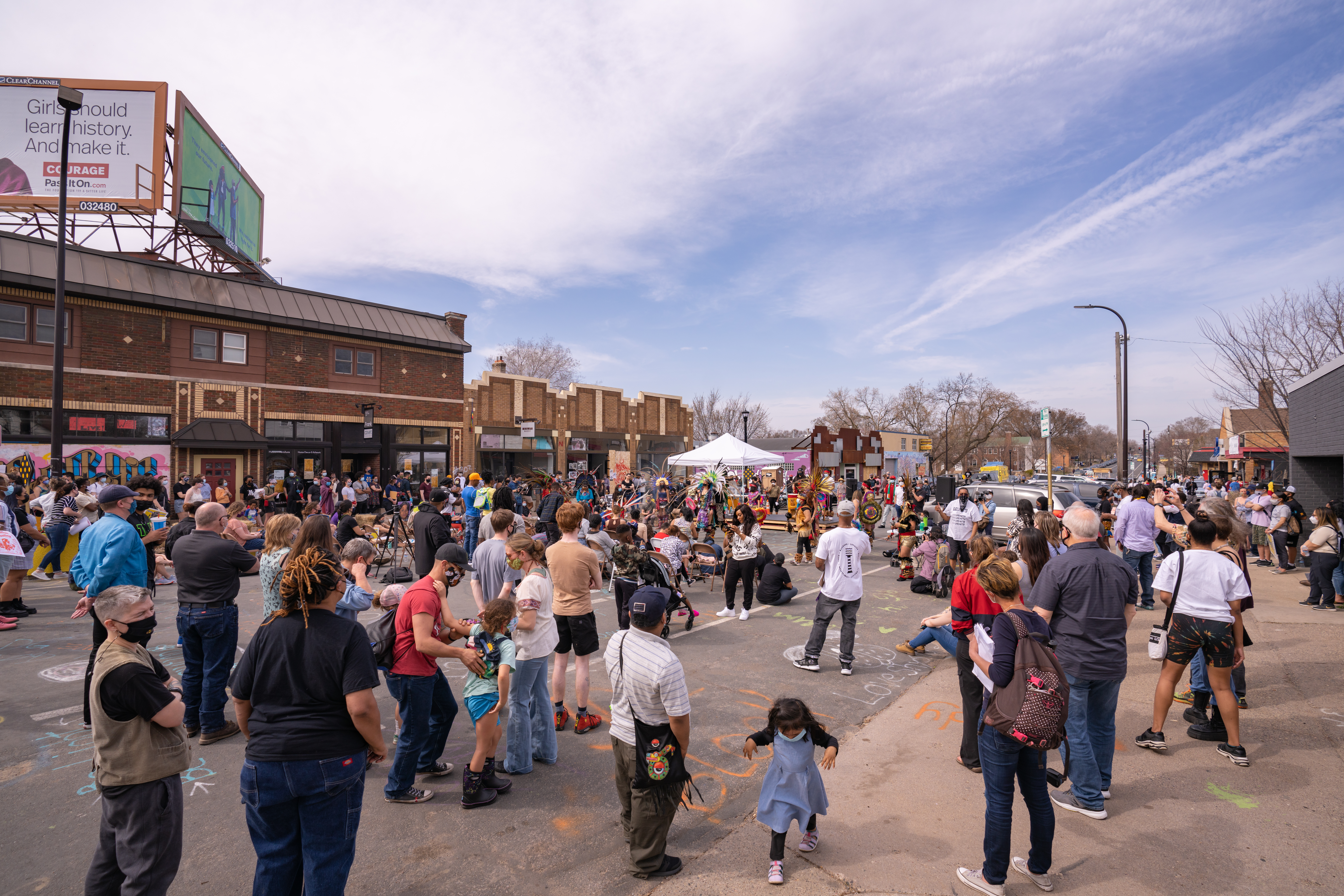
Community festival at the square, April 4, 2021.

Despite temporary closure after the fatal shooting of Imez Wright, the square remained an important gathering place during Chauvin's trial for people protesting racial injustice and seeking justice for Floyd. The square hosted daily visitors from around the nation who made pilgrimages to the intersection. On April 4, several organizations held a "People's Power Love Fest" rally that was part protest and part festival. The rally also sought support for the police abolition movement in Minneapolis, with organizations seeking signatures for a petition to amend the city's charter to replace the Minneapolis Police Department with a Department of Public Safety. On April 18, the community held an Asian solidarity rally at the square in support of Asian Americans and Pacific Islanders, who had become targets of hate and discrimination, especially during the pandemic.

==== Chauvin convicted and pledge to continue protesting ====
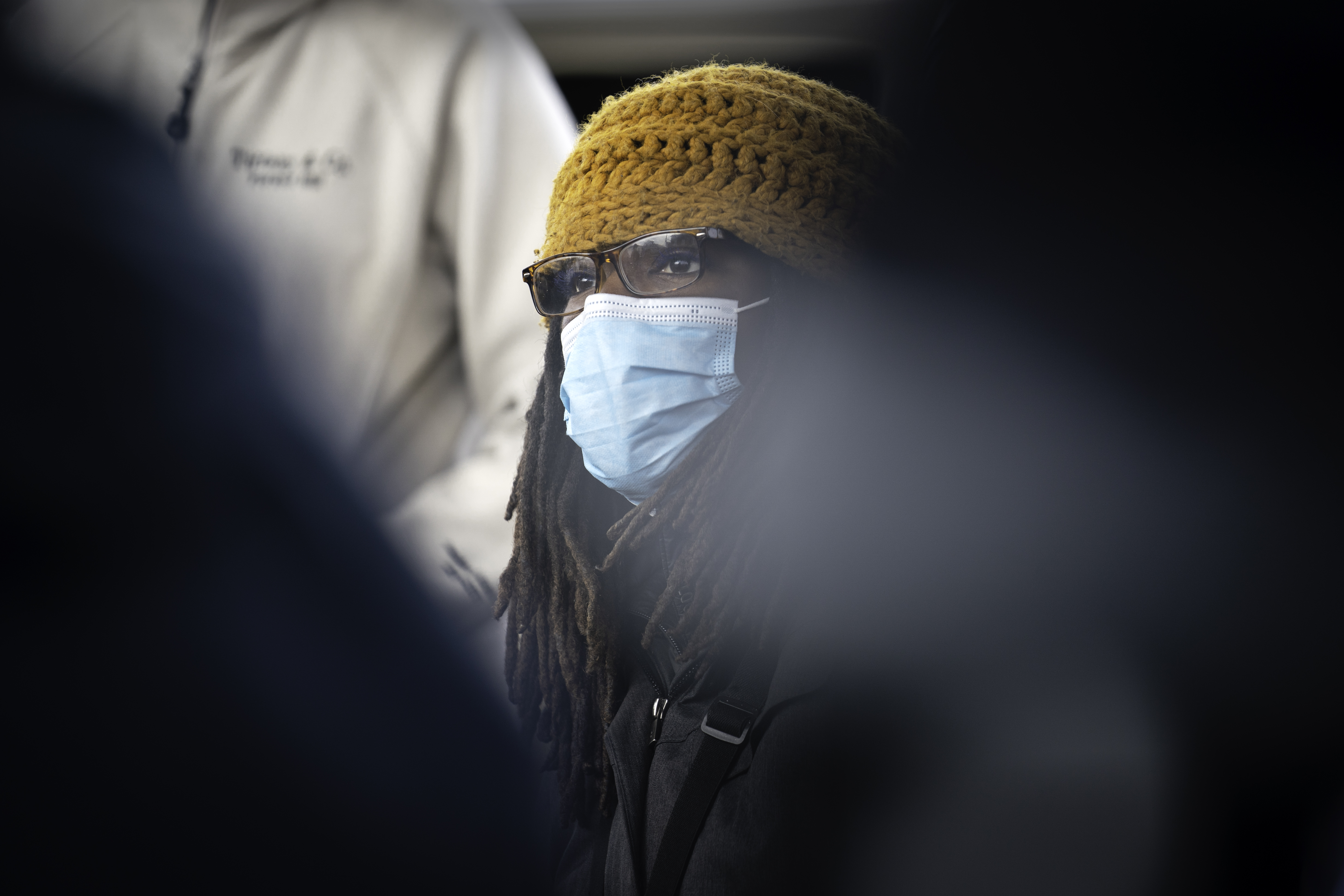
Marcia Howard, an occupied protest activist, April 21, 2021.

On April 20, Chauvin was convicted of murdering Floyd. During the announcement of the verdict, the square was the site of celebration. Organizers of the occupation of the intersection said they would continue to protest and hold the square. Activists changed a marquee that had counted down the days to Chauvin's trial to read, "Justice served?", and chanted, "One down! Three to go!", in reference to the pending trials of the other three officers who participated in Floyd's arrest and subsequent murder.

In a press conference after the Chauvin verdict, Frey called the square "a critical and important location of racial justice and healing", but said the city would move ahead with plans to reopen the intersection, not waiting for the trials of former police officers Thao, Lane, and Alexander, scheduled for August.

On Twitter, activists said in response to the city's plans, "The current state of the intersection known as George Floyd Square is contributing to the peace and safety of the surrounding neighborhoods. ... Amid ongoing threats of White Supremacist violence, in the absence of justice, the barricades and community structures at 38th and Chicago should remain through the trial of all four officers. It’s problematic to misconstrue police brutality as progress toward racial healing." Supporters of the occupation created a text messaging alert system to warn each other should city crews attempt to remove barricades and reopen the square before their demands were met.

Several neighbors and businesses owners, citing safety concerns and the police's unwillingness to respond to crimes, objected the intersection's continued closure. Business owners at the intersection reported that they lost 75% of their revenue during the occupation, and at least five business had closed.

The intersection area had been a "continuous site of protest" since the day after Floyd's murder; in the following year, thousands of people from multiple countries visited the protest and memorial site there.

==== Shooting and one-year anniversary events ====
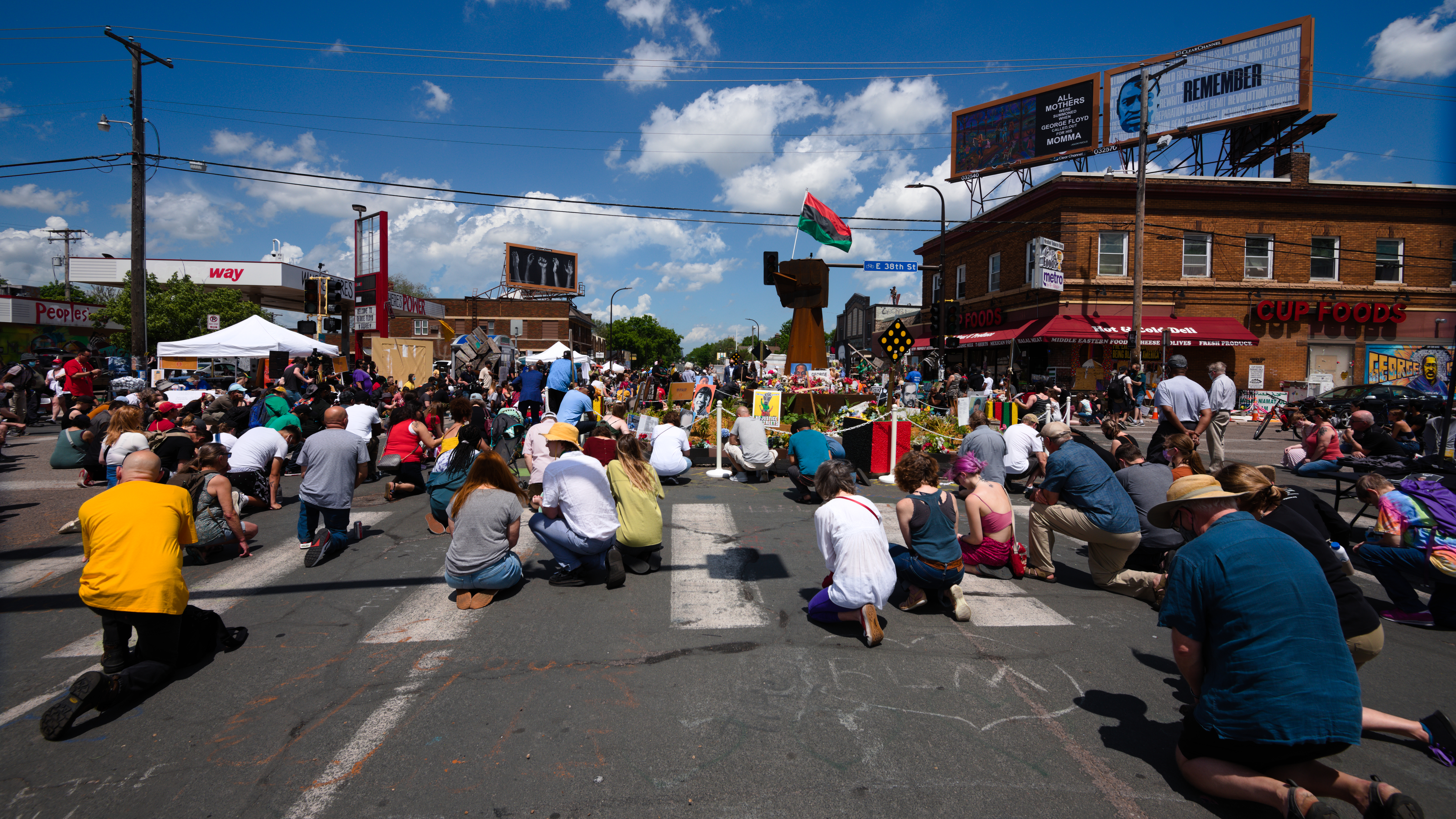
One-year anniversary event of George Floyd's murder, May 25, 2021.

On May 25, the one-year anniversary of Floyd's murder, community activists were scheduled to host a daylong "Rise & Remember" event with public art, activities for children, and music, beginning at 1 p.m. at the square. The setup for the event was interrupted at 10:09 a.m. by 20 to 30 gunshots and a speeding vehicle as bystanders ran for cover. Police reports were that the shooting happened a block away from the intersection, toward Elliot Avenue South. At least one bullet struck the storefront window of the Prestige Cuts Barber Lounge barbershop. The incident happened as live news reports were being filmed at the intersection, which captured audio of the gunshots and video footage of a dark-colored SUV driving through the intersection. One person was treated at a nearby hospital for non-life-threatening gunshot wounds.

Crowds gathered later in the afternoon for planned events, memorials, and celebrations. Some residents near the intersection expressed their desire for Meet on the Streets, the activist group holding the square, to end the occupation and for the barricades to be removed. In their view, the protest had unintended consequences such as violence and disruption of business activity that harmed Black residents. Volunteer activists said they intended the square to remain a "symbol for continued protests for justice" despite whatever plans might reopen it to traffic.

==== City begins street reopening process ====
Unannounced and early in the morning on June 3, Minneapolis city officials removed cement barricades and other objects placed in the streets of the surrounding blocks to prevent the flow of vehicular traffic. Though the scene was initially tense as demonstrators chanted and yelled at city workers, the crowd later became more relaxed. The Minneapolis Police Department did not participate in the process. After city crews left, activists quickly replaced the cement barricades with other objects to continue halting vehicular traffic in the one-block radius around the intersection of 38th Street and Chicago Avenue.

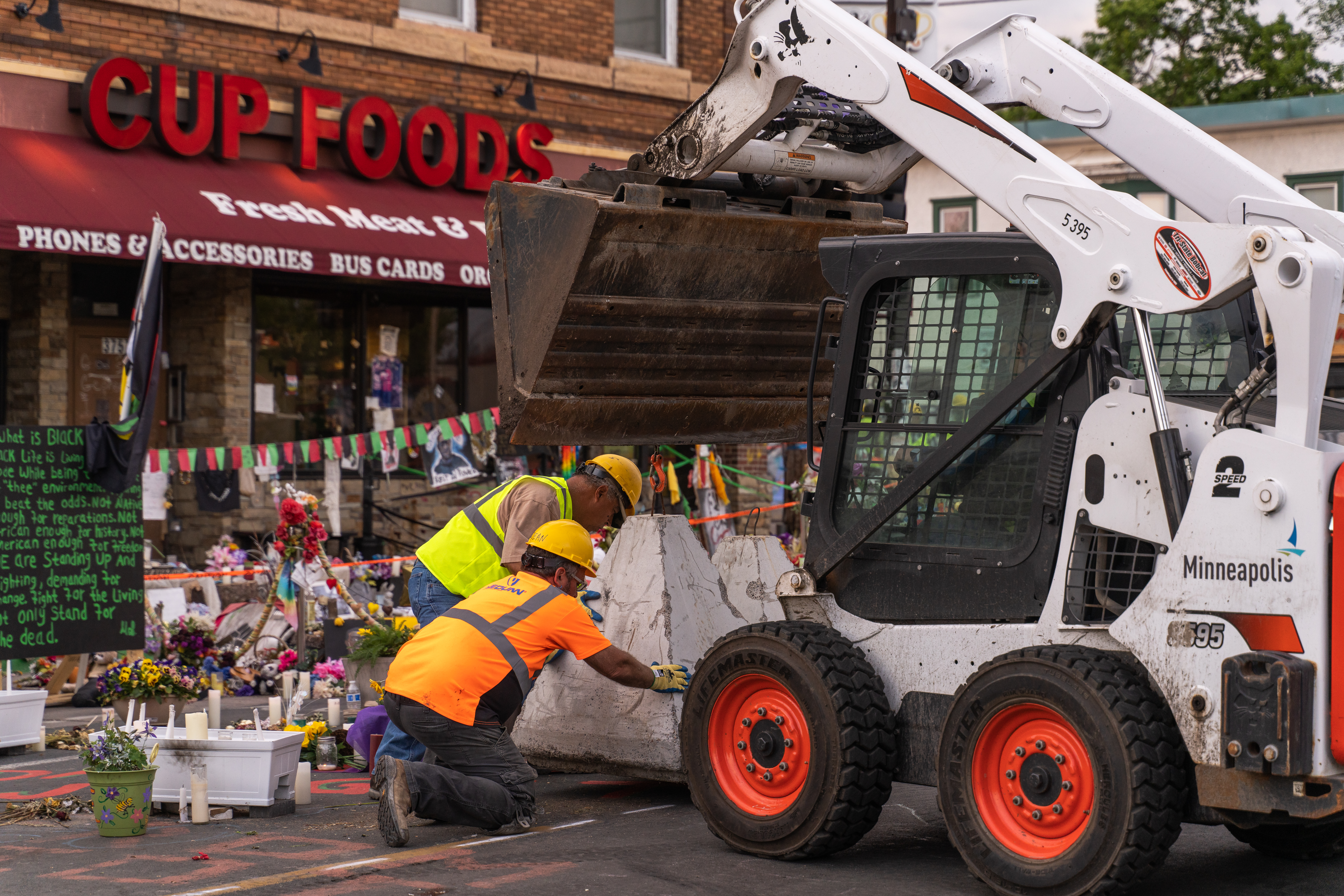
City crews at George Floyd Square, June 3, 2021.

City officials left the large fist sculpture in the middle of the intersection and said there were plans to preserve artwork and create a more permanent memorial at the intersection. Andrea Jenkins, a Minneapolis city council member who represented part of the area, said that most people supported reopening the intersection as part of the community's healing process. Mayor Frey said the intersection would be forever changed, but that the city would start to restore some services that had been disrupted by street closures. The sudden action provoked anger in some of the community. Several activists spoke out at a press conference that afternoon in opposition to the city's action.

By June 4, activists had restored much of the intersection to the way it was before and re-blocked vehicular traffic by erecting makeshift barricades, reinstalling a garden and other amenities, and putting up additional artwork. Activists pledged to continue protesting until their demands were met. On June 20, for the first time in over a year, vehicular traffic resumed through the intersection under the city's phased reopening process. Despite the reopening, the area of the square remained the location of active protest.

==== Vehicular traffic resumes and the protest persists ====
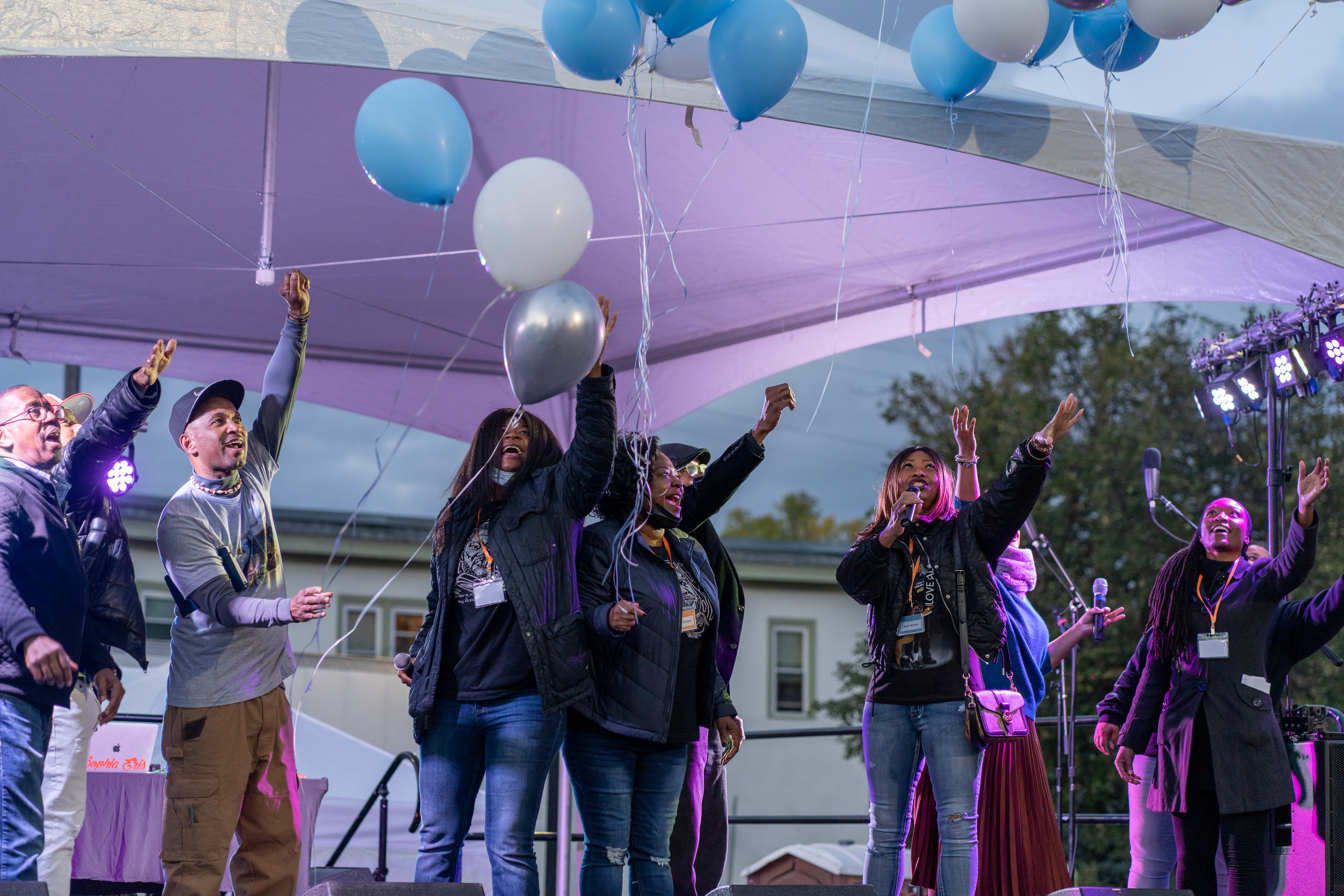
Celebration of George Floyd's life, October 14, 2021.

The occupation of the intersection lasted for over a year, from May 26, 2020, to June 20, 2021, when it partially reopened to vehicular traffic. The area hosted visitors from around the world and was used as an immersive classroom to teach students and others about racial injustice. Many of the works of art installed at the square gained worldwide recognition. The city's phased reopening process of the square included ways to preserve art and history and promote local business, such as installing parklets to calm vehicular traffic and provide more seating at area restaurants.

The square continued to serve as a community gathering location, with crowds converging to hear the announcement of Derek Chauvin's prison sentence on June 25, and featured the mantra, "One down, three to go!" in reference to the trials of the other three officers at the scene of Floyd's murder. It also hosted hundreds of people on October 14 to commemorate what would have been Floyd's 48th birthday. The occupied protests persisted at George Floyd Square through late 2021.

=== 2022 ===
The memorial area remained occupied in protest into early 2022. The fist sculptures at George Floyd Square were wrapped in white blankets in memory of Amir Locke, a man fatally shot by Minneapolis police while executing a no-knock warrant at an apartment unit on February 2.

==== Death of Larry Mosby ====
Overnight from March 11 to 12, Larry Mosby, a 45-year-old man, died in the parking lot of the abandoned Speedway gas station at 38th Street and Chicago Avenue after an apparent fentanyl overdose while parting with two other people. His accomplices had lit his body on fire in an attempt to revive him. Authorities recovered Mosby's body on March 12. The news media originally reported Mosby's death as part of an elaborate kidnapping and robbery plot based on allegations by an accomplice that resulted in an arrest, but federal and country prosecutors later dropped charges after they found the accuser's story unreliable.

==== Fatal shooting of Kirk Lee; other shooting ====
On March 19, two people were shot after an altercation near the square shortly before 9 p.m. Kirk Lee, a 46-year-old man, was fatally shot the evening of March 26 inside a home on the 3800 block of Chicago Avenue.

==== Second anniversary and other events ====
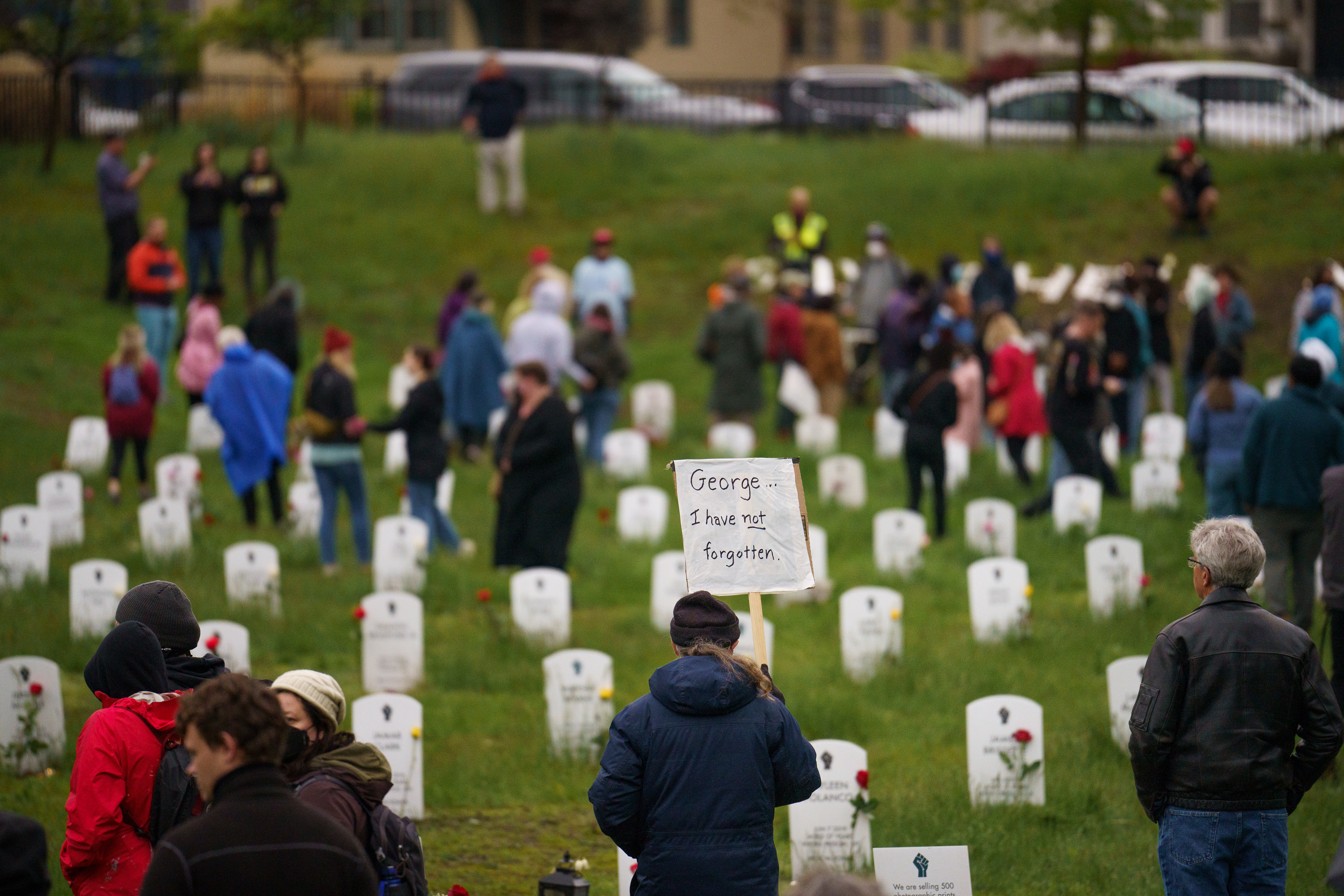
A gathering at "Say Their Names Cemetery", May 25, 2022.

The intersection remained an active site of protest two years after Floyd's murder as the city began a multi-year project to redesign the streetscape and plan a permanent memorial. Some community members and businesses supported efforts to establish a permanent memorial and resume bus service on Chicago Avenue, which had been suspended for two years. Some activists insisted the site continue to be a place of active protest until their demands were met and posted a manifesto at the square that stated their opposition to a city-commissioned memorial.

On May 25, several events commemorating the second anniversary of Floyd's murder were held at the square among public street art exhibits. A Rise & Remember festival was held May 25 to 28, with several events taking place at the intersection. In an interview with Minnesota Public Radio, Marcia Howard, a community activist at the square, called the ongoing protest "the longest political occupation in American history" and said activists were "still there holding out justice for George Floyd".

Community members hosted a Juneteenth street festival at the square on June 19. On August 3, Mary Moriarty, Martha Holton Dimick, and other candidates in the primary election for Hennepin County attorney participated in a community conversation near the square about public safety.

==== Fatal shootings of Mohamed Ali Omar and James Rodgers ====
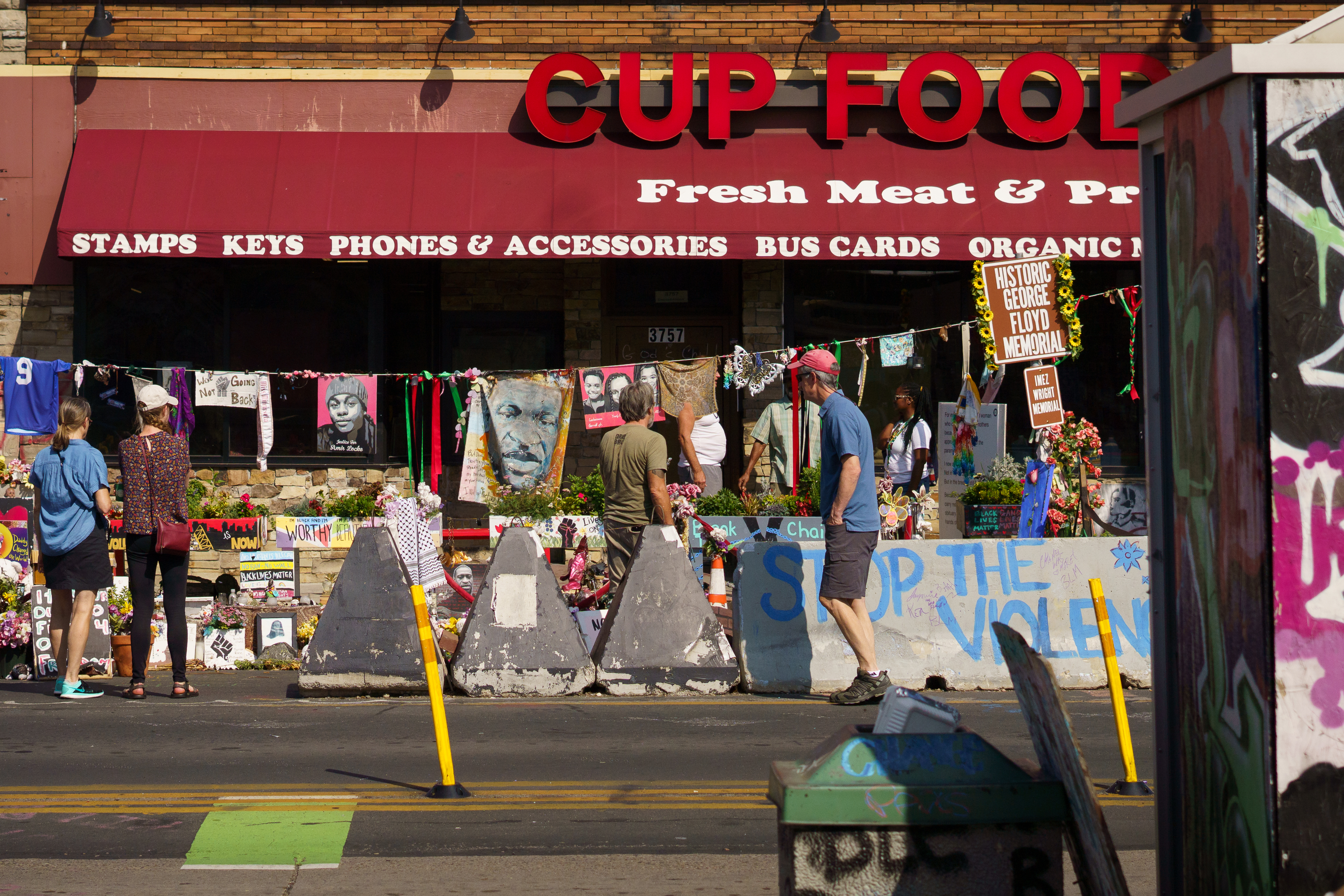
George Floyd Square on August 14, 2022, several hours after a fatal shooting.

In August, two homicides occurred within a week of each other. At 3:21 a.m. on August 7, Mohamed Ali Omar, a 29-year-old Minneapolis resident, was killed by multiple gunshot wounds. Police recovered his body on a sidewalk next to the abandoned Speedway gas station at East 38th Street and Chicago Avenue. At 12:51 p.m. on August 14, police responded to a ShotSpotter report of gunfire. They found Aaron James Rodgers, a 25-year old from Las Vegas, Nevada, at the 38th and Chicago intersection with gunshot wounds. He was pronounced dead shortly after being transported to a nearby hospital. Police also aided another man they found in a nearby alley who had been critically injured by gunfire. The shooter fled and was not apprehended. Police said that someone may have removed evidence, such as the gun or bullet casings, from the scene before police investigators arrived.

==== City-community engagement ====
The city continued community engagement conversations about the future of the square in late 2022. The area had been a continuous site of protests since Floyd's murder. In October, city officials revealed plans to purchase the abandoned Speedway gas station, which protesters rebranded "Peoples' Way", from the owner, who wished to divest themself of the property for safety reasons. The gas station property was also a venue for protests over police killings.

=== 2023–present ===
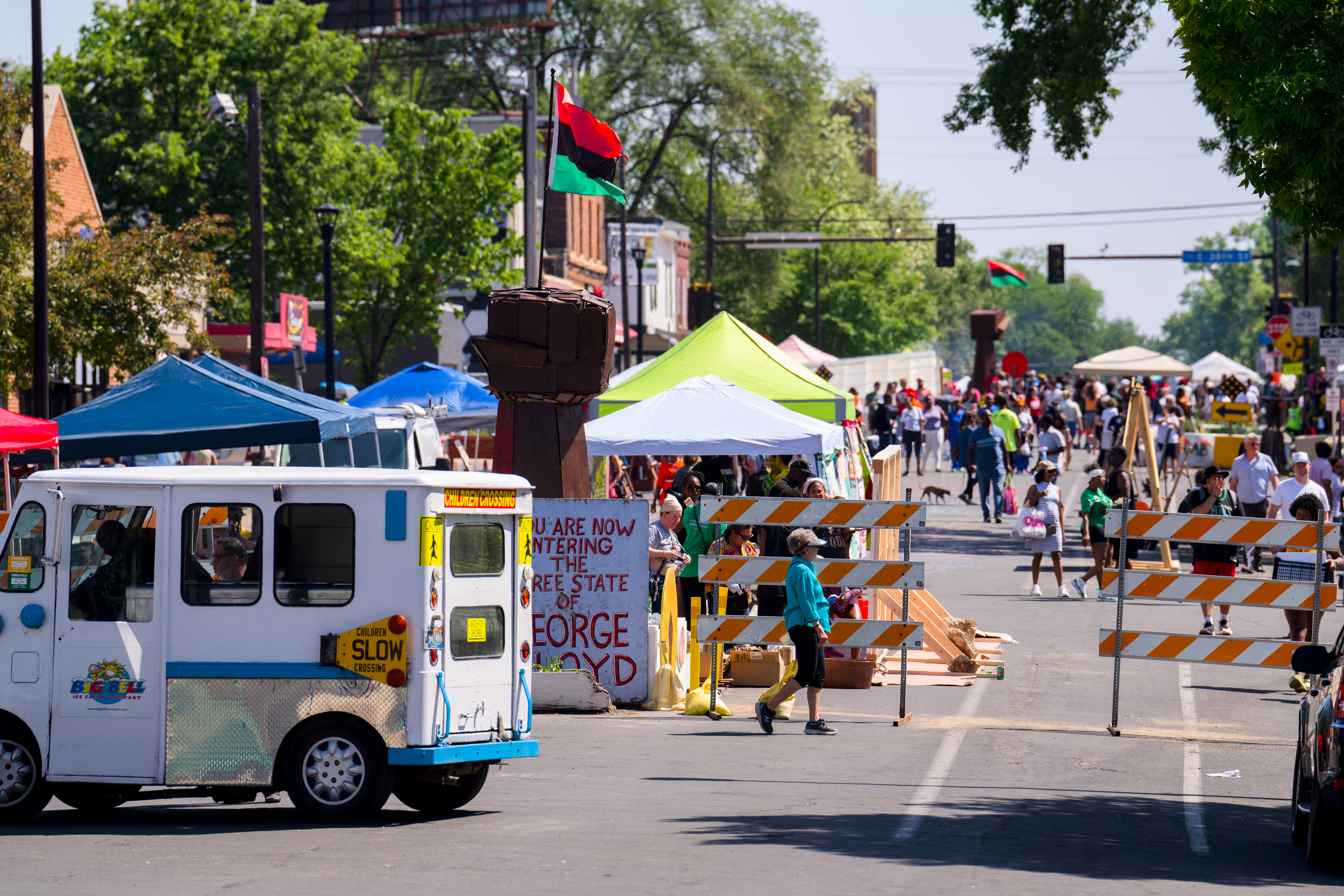
Rise and Remember festival, May 27, 2023

Tension persisted between organizers of the occupied protest, neighborhood residents, and city officials into 2023. The intersection remained closed to Metro Transit buses and was not part of the new Metro D Line rapid bus service that circumvented the square area. On May 2, Tou Thao was found guilty of aiding and abetting manslaughter, which marked the conclusion of all state and federal court cases related to Floyd's murder. Thao's conviction signaled that a key demand of the George Floyd Square's Justice Resolution 001 had been met: that all four police officers be held legally accountable for murdering Floyd. Activists at George Floyd Square said that they would continue to protest until the city met the rest of their demands. In late May, several racial justice events were held at George Floyd Square related to the third anniversary of Floyd's murder. Jeanelle Austin, director of the nonprofit George Floyd Global Memorial organization that functions as a caretaker for artifacts at the site, said that the intersection remained an active site of protest.

By May 25, 2024, four years after Floyd's murder, the area remained a gathering place for protest.

== Public art, amenities, and services ==
=== Boundaries and entrances ===
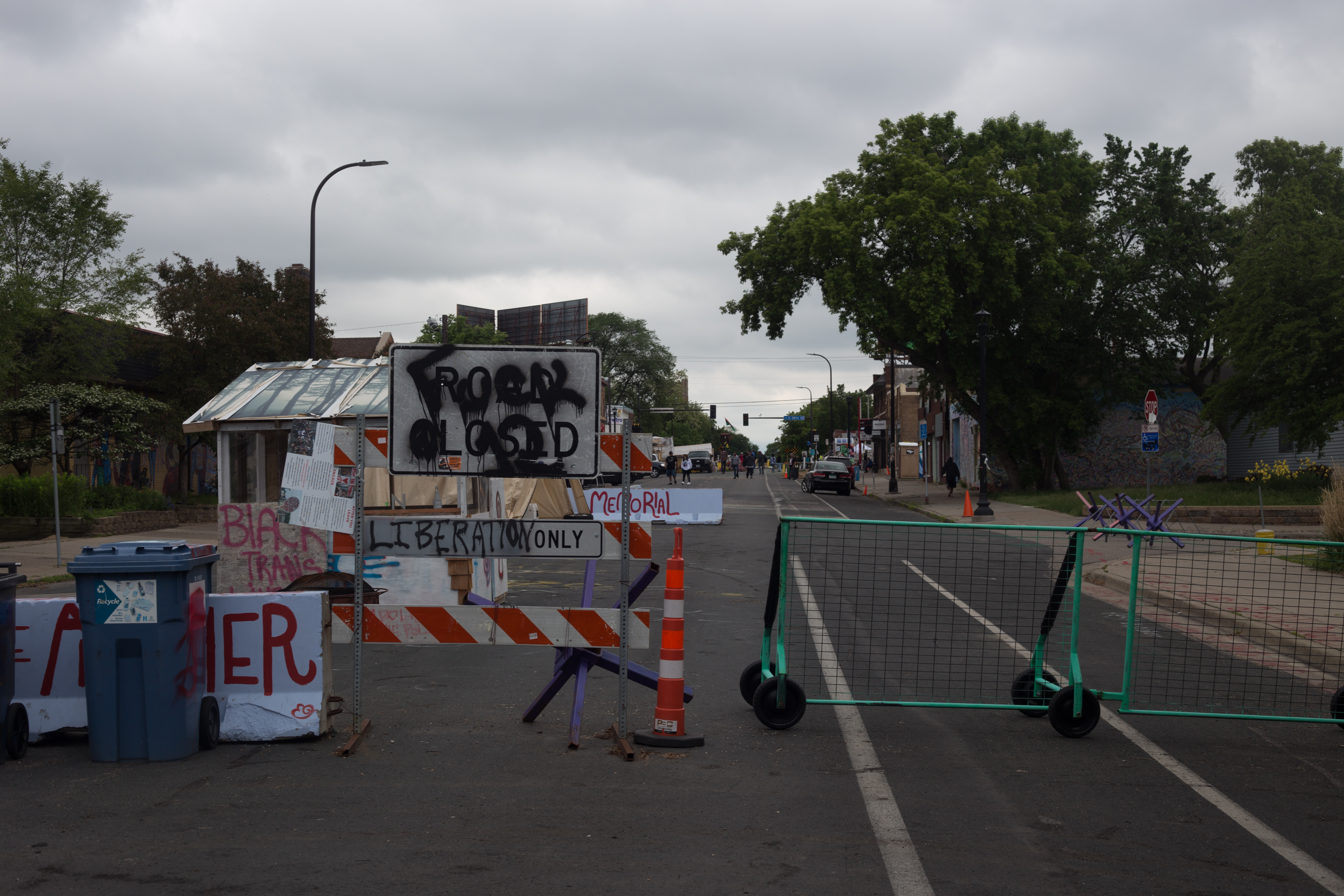
Makeshift barricades, May 30, 2021

George Floyd Square features a broad collection of street art and guerrilla gardens tended to by volunteers. The protest zone centers on the intersection of East 38th Street and Chicago Avenue and encompasses several city blocks. The four street approaches to the intersection feature entrance signs welcoming visitors and sculptures of raised fists about two blocks away in each direction from the main intersection.

There is no agreed-upon boundary for the protest zone. Meet on the Streets defined the boundaries of George Floyd Square as "35th Street East, 42nd Street East, Bloomington Avenue South, and 4th Avenue South." During the course of the occupation, various protester-installed barricades and structures marked the area's boundaries. The north boundary at Chicago Avenue and East 37th Street was marked by a warming house, made of a retrofitted ice shanty. The south boundary at Chicago Avenue and East 39th Street was marked by a barricade and guard shack installed by demonstrators.

Until June 3, 2021, city-installed concrete barricades blocked vehicular traffic into the area to protect visitors to the square. Protesters reinforced the city-installed cement barricades with iron bars in the style of Czech hedgehogs, bike racks, and other objects and materials. On June 20, 2021, city workers removed most of the barricades and other obstructions to allow vehicular traffic to flow through the area, but most of the protest zone and street art remained intact. By late 2022, some demonstrator-installed gardens had been abandoned.

=== George Floyd murals ===
==== Blue and yellow ====
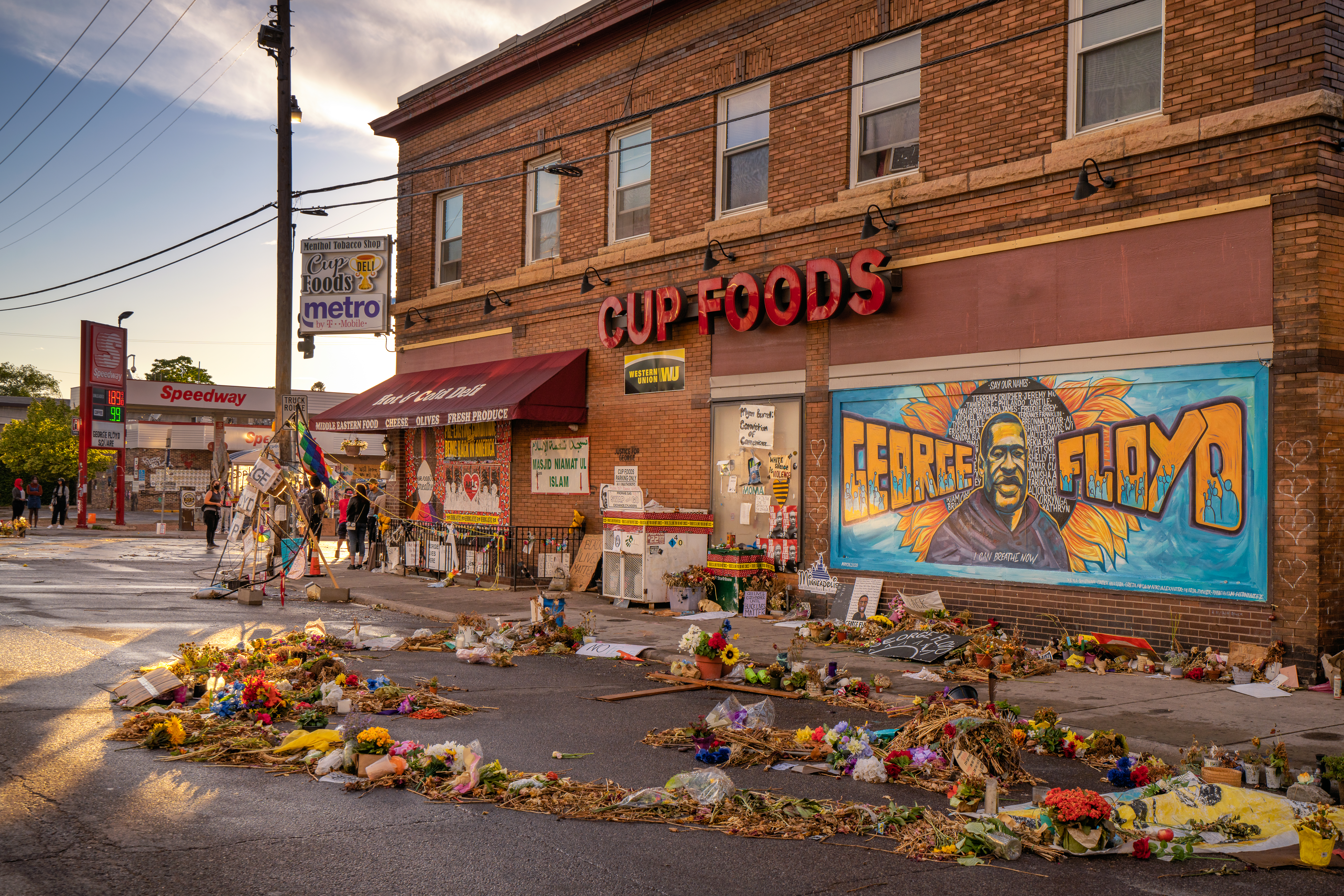
Blue-and-yellow mural, June 24, 2020

A blue and yellow mural of George Floyd on the side of the Cup Foods grocery store became one of the most recognizable images of the global protest movement sparked by his murder, and a digital rendering of it served as a backdrop to his casket at his funeral in Houston, Texas. Created by community artists Cadex Herrera, Greta McLain, and Xena Goldman, the mural was one of the first public artworks in Minneapolis to honor Floyd's memory. At the suggestions of a community member, the words "I can breathe now" were added to promote community healing, which meant to reflect spiritually on Floyd's dying words, "I can't breathe". The work drew some criticism for being created without the input of Black artists and the nearby community, and it started a discussion about representation in artistic response to Floyd's murder. It was vandalized in 2020 and 2021, but restored.

==== Black and white ====
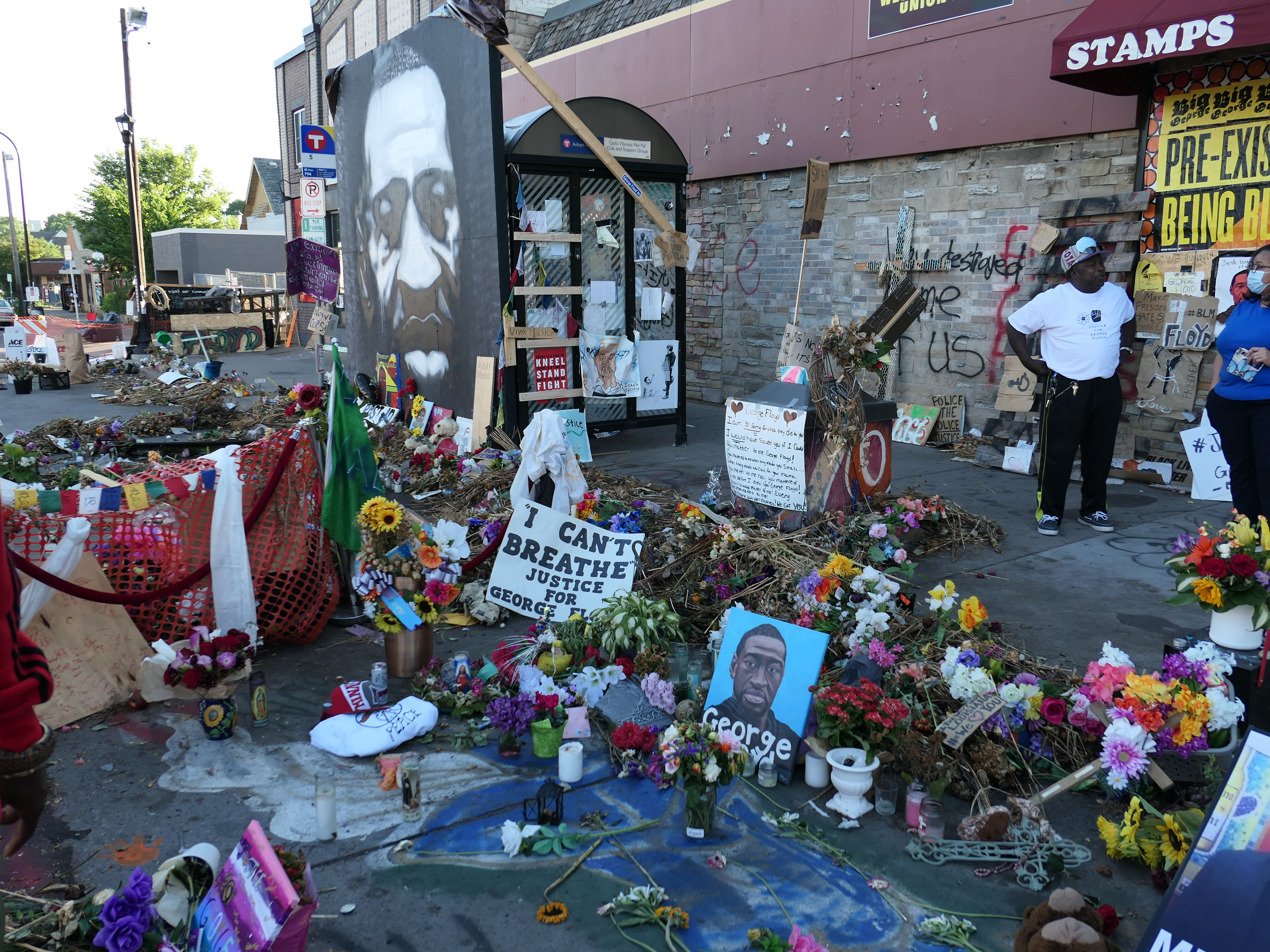
Black-and-white mural, June 27, 2020

Peyton Scott Russell, a Minneapolis native and street artist, created a 12-by-12-foot (3.7 by 3.7 m) black-and-white mural of Floyd's face. It was created in his studio over three days and relocated to the intersection in early June 2020. Pictures of the mural were shared worldwide.

=== Large raised fist sculpture ===
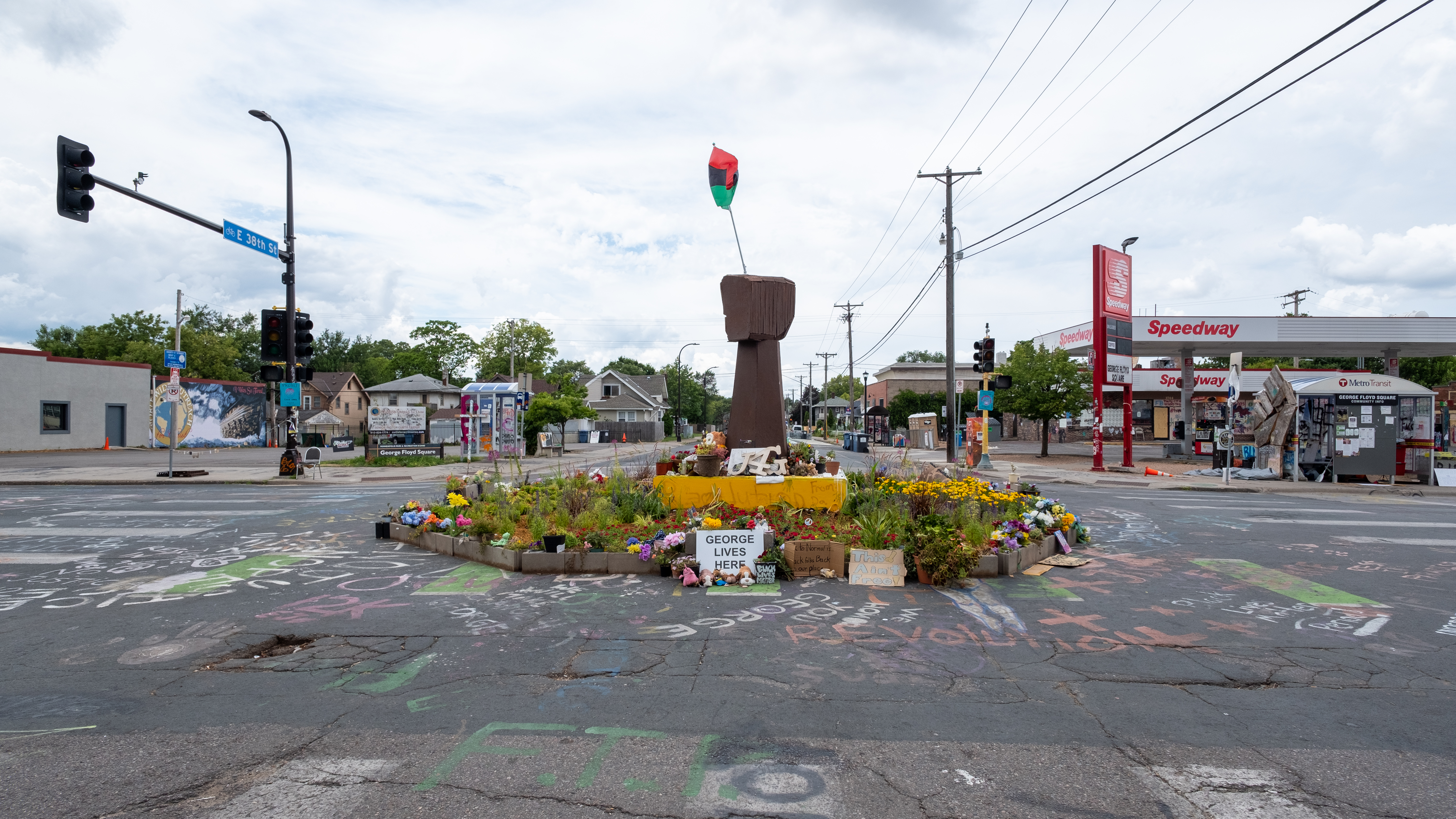
Raised fist sculpture and roundabout, August 5, 2020

A large wooden sculpture of a raised fist was erected in the middle of the East 38th Street and Chicago Avenue intersection. It was created by unknown artists. In mid-2020, the city began to consider several options to preserve the sculpture, either in the middle of the intersection or on its northeast corner.

On Martin Luther King Jr. Day in 2021, volunteers replaced the plywood fist sculpture with a steel version that could withstand weathering. The steel replacement was designed by local artist Jordan Powell Karis and built with the assistance of welding artist Seven Bailey and other community artists from the Chicago Avenue Fire Arts Center.

On April 14, 2021, the same wooden sculpture that had been at the square reemerged in Brooklyn Center during protests over the killing of Daunte Wright by police officer Kim Potter and became part of a memorial for Wright.

=== "Peoples' Way" abandoned gas station ===
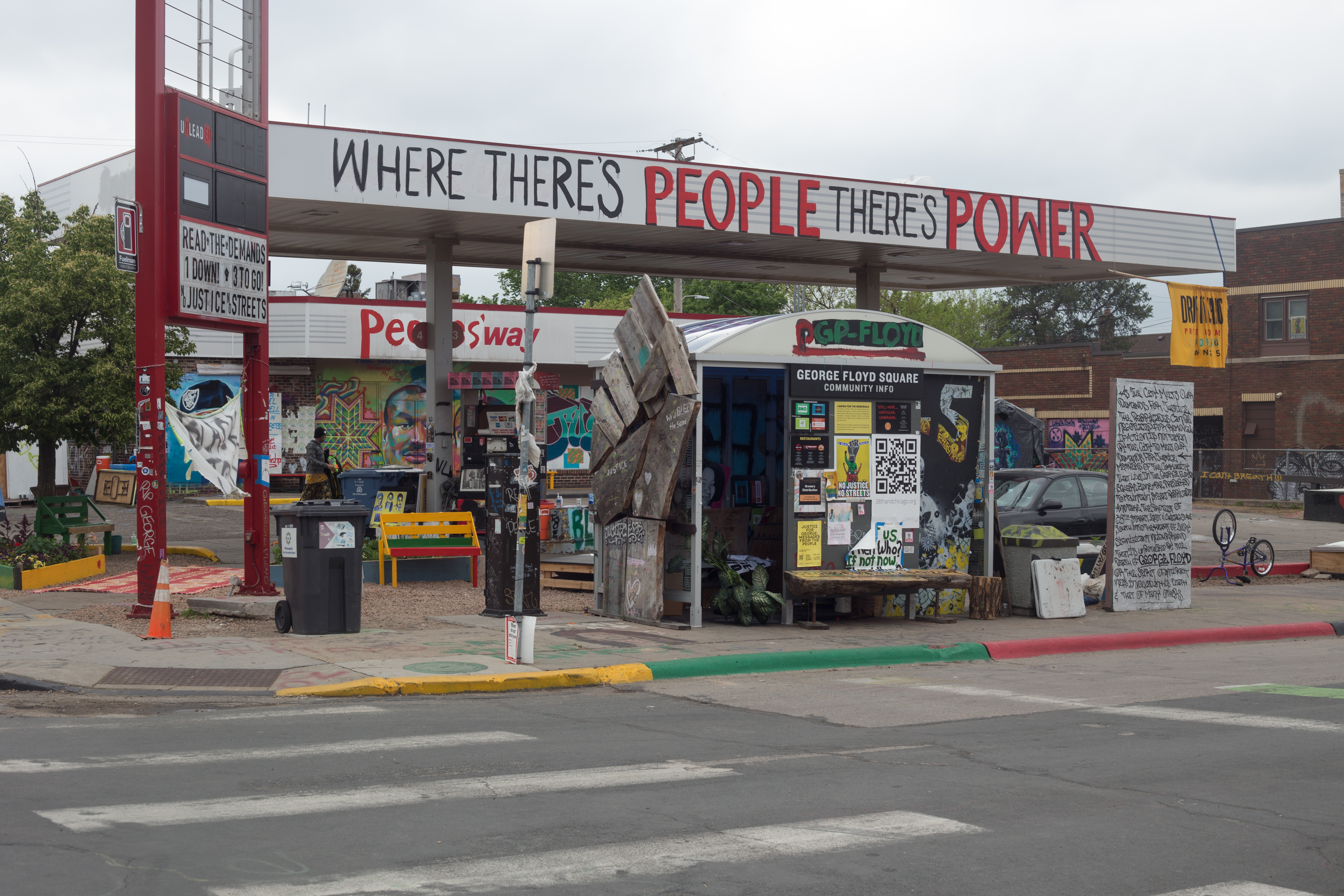
"Peoples' Way" abandoned gas station, May 30, 2021

A Speedway gas station at 3744 Chicago Avenue inside the square area was damaged during unrest in the immediate aftermath of Floyd’s murder. After the operator of the gas station abandoned the property, activists painted it over with graffiti and rebranded it "Peoples' Way". The parking lot and covered gas pumps served as a central meeting place for neighbors and featured a small library, clothes donation area, and food shelf. A mural of Paul Castaway, a Native American man killed in 2015 by police in Denver, Colorado, was painted on the plywood panels of the gas station building. It also contained memorials for Harden Sherrell, Fong Fee, Winston Smith, and Amir Locke.

Activists and community members used the property to host regular community meetings and special events. In 2020 and 2021, activists used the station's letter board to count down the days to the trial of Derek Chauvin. There was an overdose death at the property in March 2022. On August 7, 2022, a man was killed by multiple gunshot wounds in the parking lot.

in October 2022, city officials revealed plans to purchase the gas station from the owner, who wished to divest themself of the property for safety reasons.

=== "Say Their Names" symbolic cemetery ===
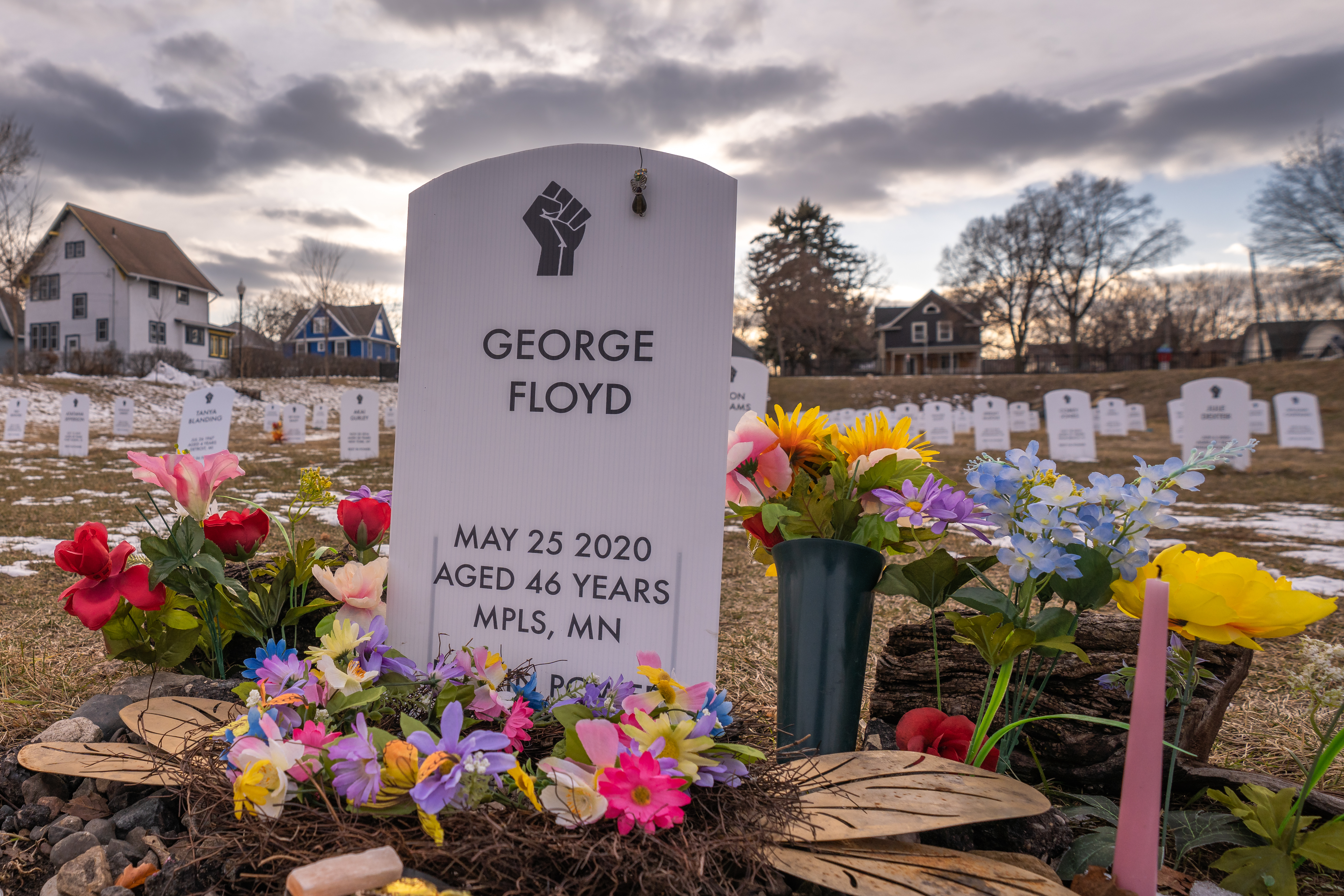
Symbolic cemetery, March 17, 2021

In a grassy area at East 37th Street and Park Avenue South, a block north of the center of the square, artists created a symbolic cemetery with 150 headstone markers for people of color killed by police. The exhibit was initially conceived by student artists Anna Barber, a Chicago resident, and Conner Wright, a Missouri resident, and was created with the help of 15 local volunteers. It began with 100 headstones of Black people killed by law enforcement, including memorials for Philando Castile, Tamir Rice, Jamar Clark, Breonna Taylor, and Aiyana Jones.

=== Street medics and 612 MASH ===
A group of protest street medics staffed a bus parked at the square that was referred to as "612 M*A*S*H". The acronym stood for "Minneapolis All Shall Heal" and 612 is Minneapolis's area code. The medical volunteers, who were health professionals, provided some free medical services, such as basic first aid and trauma care, to people at the square. A tent the group used was destroyed by fire on October 7, 2020, and the group created a winterized space for use for the following months. The volunteer-led effort codified itself as 612 MASH, a 501c3 nonprofit organization.

== List of 24 demands ==
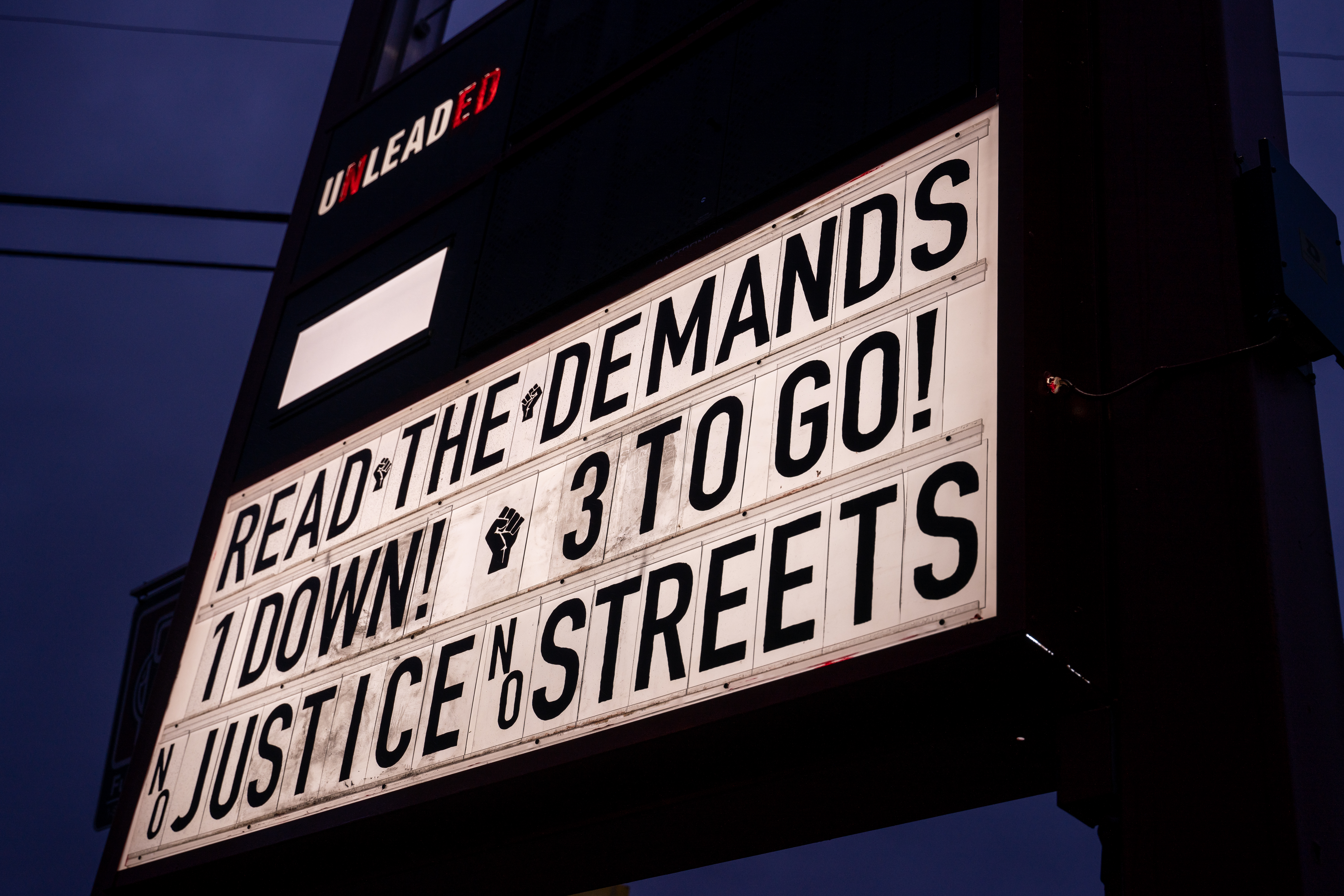
A sign referencing the list of demands, May 18, 2021

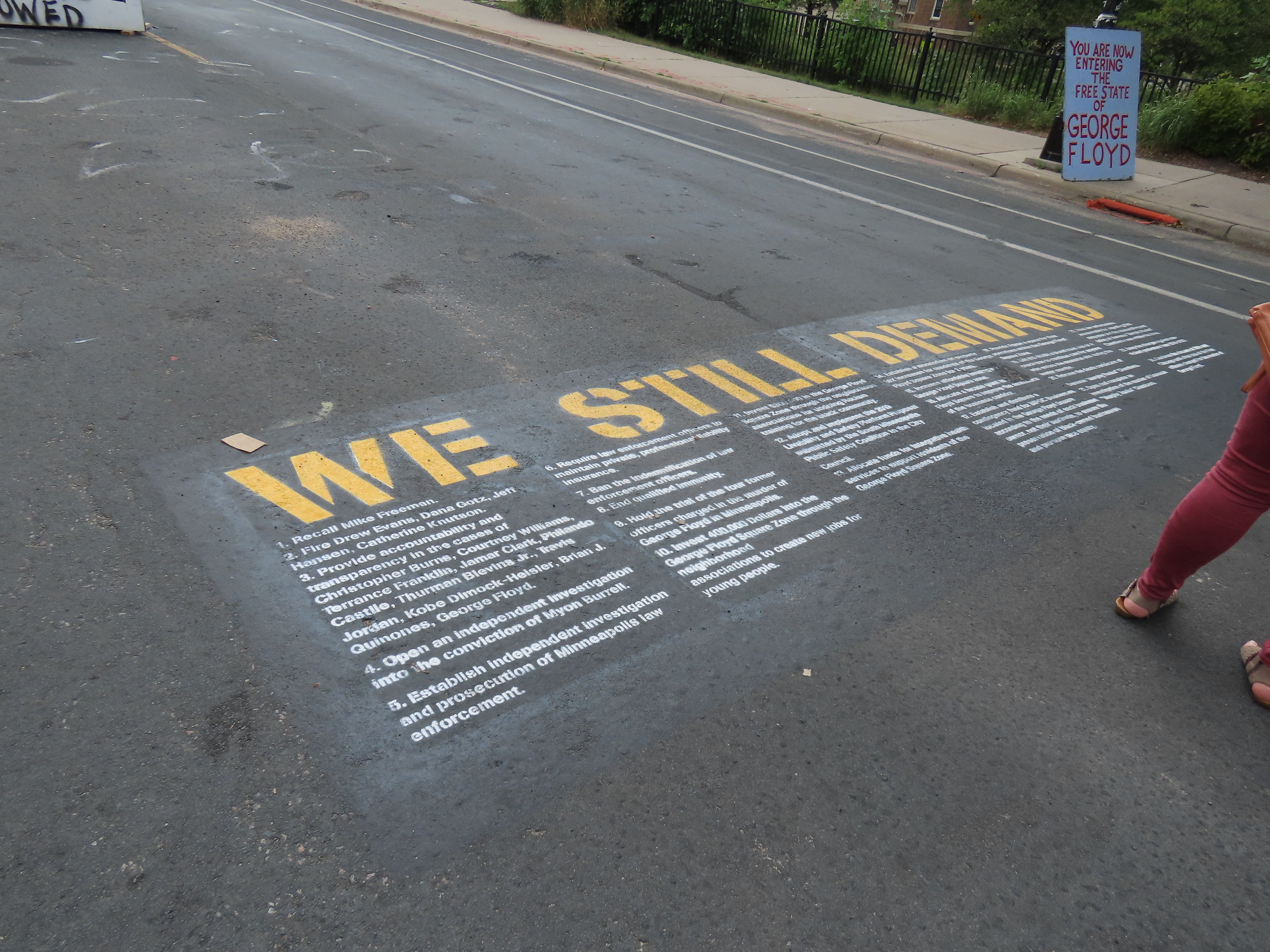
List of demands stenciled on the street, July 16, 2021

On August 7, 2020, protesters presented the city with a list of 24 demands they wanted met before the intersection reopened to vehicular traffic. In April 2022, the city said it had met the demands it had the legal authority to meet, but there were varying perspectives on how well they had been accomplished.

24 Demands for Justice
Demand	Status
Recall Mike Freeman, Hennepin County Attorney.	Freeman retired in 2022.
Fire [several employees] of the Bureau of Criminal Apprehension.	
Provide accountability and transparency of several criminal cases.	
Open an independent investigation into the conviction of a person convicted of recent crime.	
Establish independent investigation and prosecution of Minneapolis law enforcement, appointed by the Governor of Minnesota.	
Require law enforcement officers to maintain private, professional liability insurance.	
Ban the indemnification of law enforcement officers.	
End qualified immunity.	
Hold the trial of the four former officers charged in the murder of George Floyd in Minneapolis.	
Invest $400,000 into the George Floyd Square Zone through the neighborhood associations to create new jobs for young people, which will help deter violence.	
Invest $300,000 into the George Floyd Square Zone through the neighborhood associations to provide Undoing Racism training for the Black community provided by the People’s Institute for Survival and Beyond.	
Adopt and implement the 2019 Livability and Safety Platform Proposal submitted by the South Minneapolis Public Safety Coalition to the City Council.	
Allocate funds for integrative health services to support residents of the George Floyd Square Zone through the ReCAST grant managed by the Division of Race & Equity.	
Establish a moratorium on property tax increases for residents of the George Floyd Square Zone for 2 years.	
Include a rent-to-own option in new housing construction for renters.	
Allocate a façade grant to George Floyd Square to improve the aesthetics of the business corridor.	
Establish and distribute a contingency fund for Black, Indigenous, and People of Color (BIPOC) businesses located in the George Floyd Square according to the needs of each business owner, not their landlords, to ensure the preservation of Black-owned businesses and promote race equity.	
Provide Agape a space for their operations within the George Floyd Square Zone.	
Gift 612-MASH a blood bank bus or a coach bus to continue care for anyone who enters the memorial site during the winter months.	
Release the death certificate of Dameon “Murphy Ranks” Chambers.	
Open and complete an investigation of the murder of Dameon "Murphy Ranks" Chambers.	
Hold law enforcement accountable for impeding EMS response and the mishandling and delay of Dameon "Murphy Ranks" Chambers case within the zone.	
Drop the charges against non-violent protesters from 2016 to 2017.	
Continue the closure of the intersection of 38th Street East and Chicago Avenue South until after trial of the four officers charged for the murder of George Floyd.	Chauvin was convicted in April 2021; Lane pleaded guilty in May 2022; Kueng was convicted in October 2022; and Thao was convicted in May 2023.

== Controversies, issues, and themes ==
=== "Autonomous zone" and policing ===
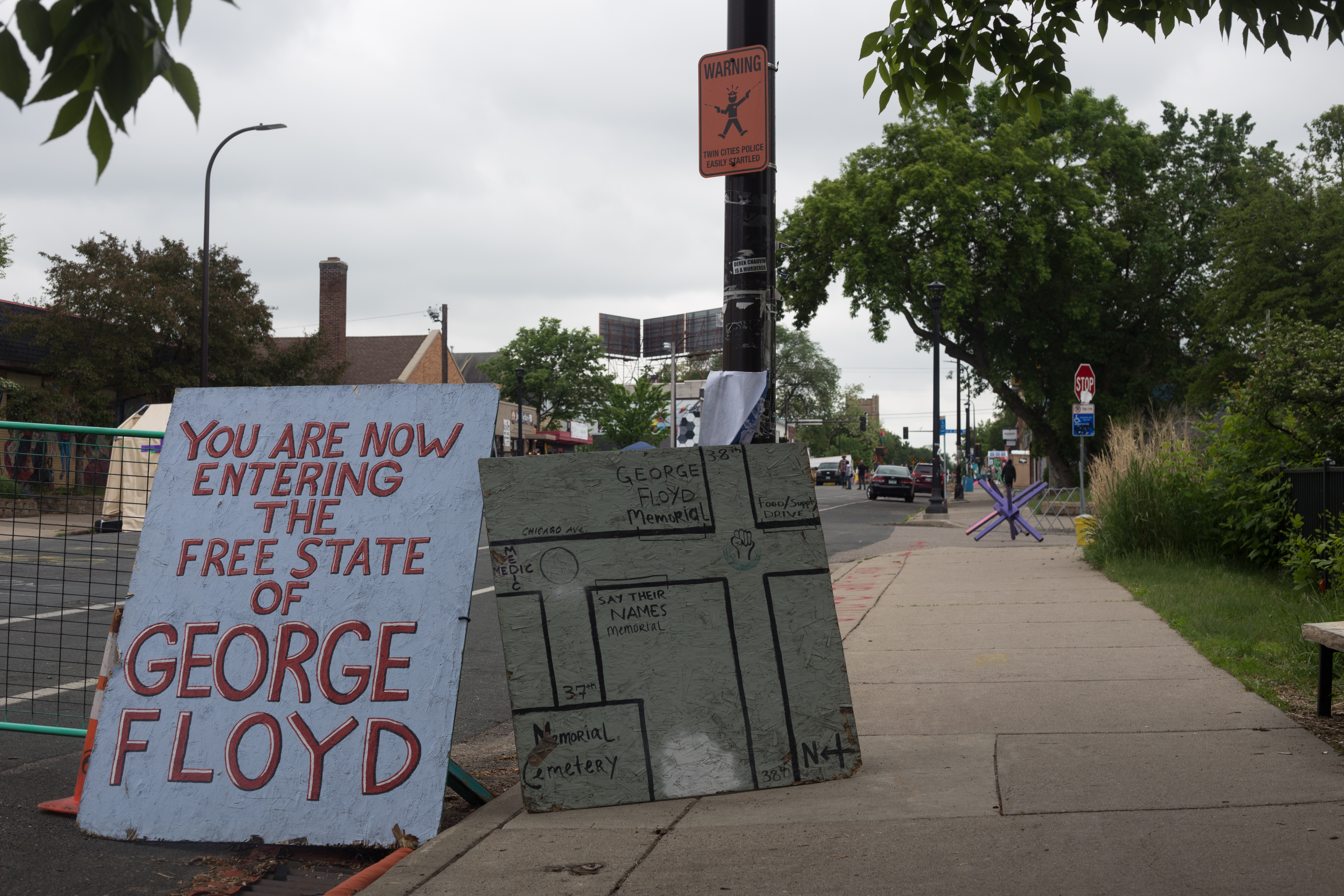
A map and a sign on Chicago Avenue stating, "You are now entering the Free State of George Floyd", May 30, 2022

A sign at an entrance to the barricaded area around the square read "You are now entering the Free State of George Floyd". The mantra "No justice, no street" was frequently used by protesters at the intersection. Supporters of the occupation called the area an "autonomous zone", while detractors used the term "no-go zone". The Minneapolis Police Department did not publicly acknowledge that the area was autonomous, but discussions between police officers picked up by scanners revealed a reluctance to enter the area. In February 2021, Minneapolis Mayor Jacob Frey said that the square "is not an autonomous zone and will not and cannot be an autonomous zone”.

Resident-appointed "guardians" manned the barricades and at times controlled who could enter the intersection. The guardians were described as predominately white neighbors, who worked with emergency services but would not allow police to enter. Police officers largely avoided the area surrounding the square in the months after Floyd's murder, furthering the perception that the area was a "police-free" or "no-go" zone. In some instances, police were unwilling to enter the area to retrieve victims of crimes, and asked victims to exit the barricaded perimeter to receive aid. A volunteer team of medics inside the square treated many minor injuries and helped transport people to police and emergency medical services nearby. Shooting victims had to be dragged out of the area to reach emergency vehicles. After calling 911 to seek help, several domestic assault victims were told by police to move outside the barricaded area to receive aid. Police and residents near the square said that stolen vehicles were abandoned near the square and people fleeing police used the barricaded area to evade the pursuit of law enforcement. Tow truck companies refused to haul away vehicles that had been stowed there. Fearing violence, some food delivery service drivers refused to venture into the area.

=== Crime and safety ===
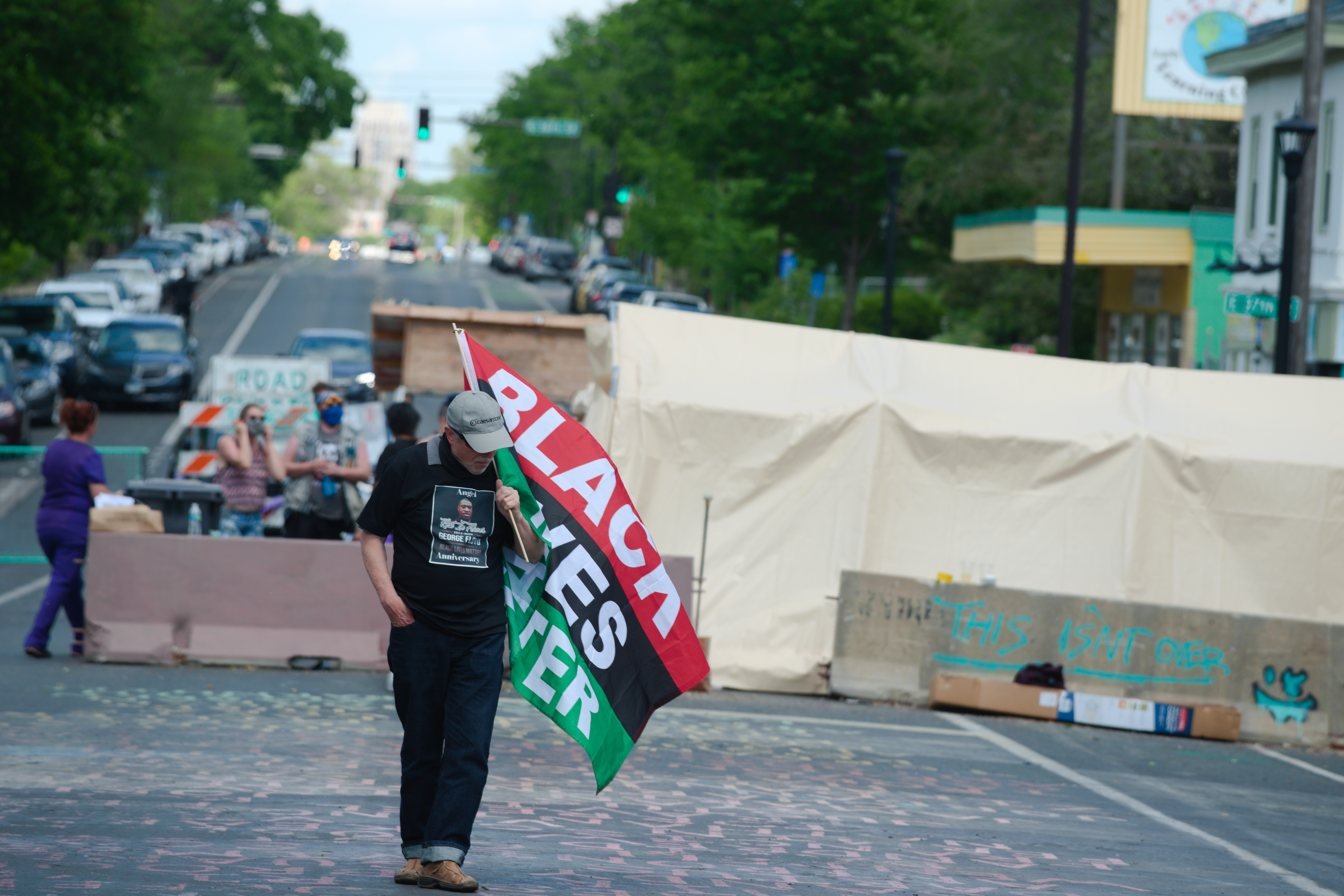
North entrance on Chicago Avenue to George Floyd Square, May 25, 2021

Concerns about public safety created tension within the community and challenges for city officials. Before Floyd's murder, the intersection had a reputation for gang activity, but it was transformed into a memorial space and community gathering spot. By nightfall, however, the autonomous zone was known for regular gunfire incidents. In the seven-week period after Floyd's murder, 11 people were shot and 233 gunfire incidents were reported in the area, which did not have a single gunfire incident during the same stretch of time the previous year. Some gang members used the barricades around the site to control entrance, allowing illicit business to continue undisturbed, and authorities investigated an illegal arms dealer who used the site for gun sales.

Some residents felt the police had pulled back from the area of the memorial site to avoid confrontation and that they had refused to engage with perpetrators and victims of crimes. When police did enter the square to respond to emergencies, they encountered hostile crowds. Officers often requested that volunteer medics and community patrol members bring suspects and victims outside the barricaded area where officers could pick them up. The police's cautious approach came as violent crime in the area rose sharply. At Chicago Avenue and East 35th Street, a few blocks north of the intersection, Mario Sanchez Mendieta, a 17-year old, was shot and killed on July 23, 2020. On July 27, 2020, 29-year-old Andrew DeJon Davis was shot and killed at the same location. Though it occurred close to the memorial, the homicide was not believed to have had anything to do with the site. On December 27, 2020, when police responded to reports that two people had been shot at the square, they could not find the victims and claimed that evidence was removed from the scene.

By late 2020, the number of reported violent crimes was considerably higher in Minneapolis's Ward 8, which included the autonomous zone, than in the average ward. Some advocates argued that community members felt safer with the volunteer patrols of the area, while other residents said they did not feel welcome at the square and that the autonomous zone was an unsafe way to accomplish change. When officers responded to shootings in the area, they claimed that bystanders destroyed evidence, making investigation of crime difficult. Leaders of the Worldwide Outreach for Christ, a church with a decades-long presence in the area, believed the occupation gave cover to illegal street gang activity.

The number of violent crimes at the intersection and surrounding blocks increased significantly from 2019 to 2020, as did citywide totals. In 2020, there were 19 fatal and nonfatal shootings in the area, including 14 between May and August, as compared to three in all of 2019. Gunshots detection by the ShotSpotter system for the area around 38th Street and Chicago Avenue increased from 33 in 2019 to 700 in 2020. Violent crime in the Minneapolis neighborhoods of Powderhorn Park, Central, Bryant and Bancroft—the broader area around the square—increased 66 percent in 2020; Minneapolis as a whole saw a 25 percent increase in violent crime such as homicide, rape, robbery, and assault.

=== Local and Black-owned businesses ===
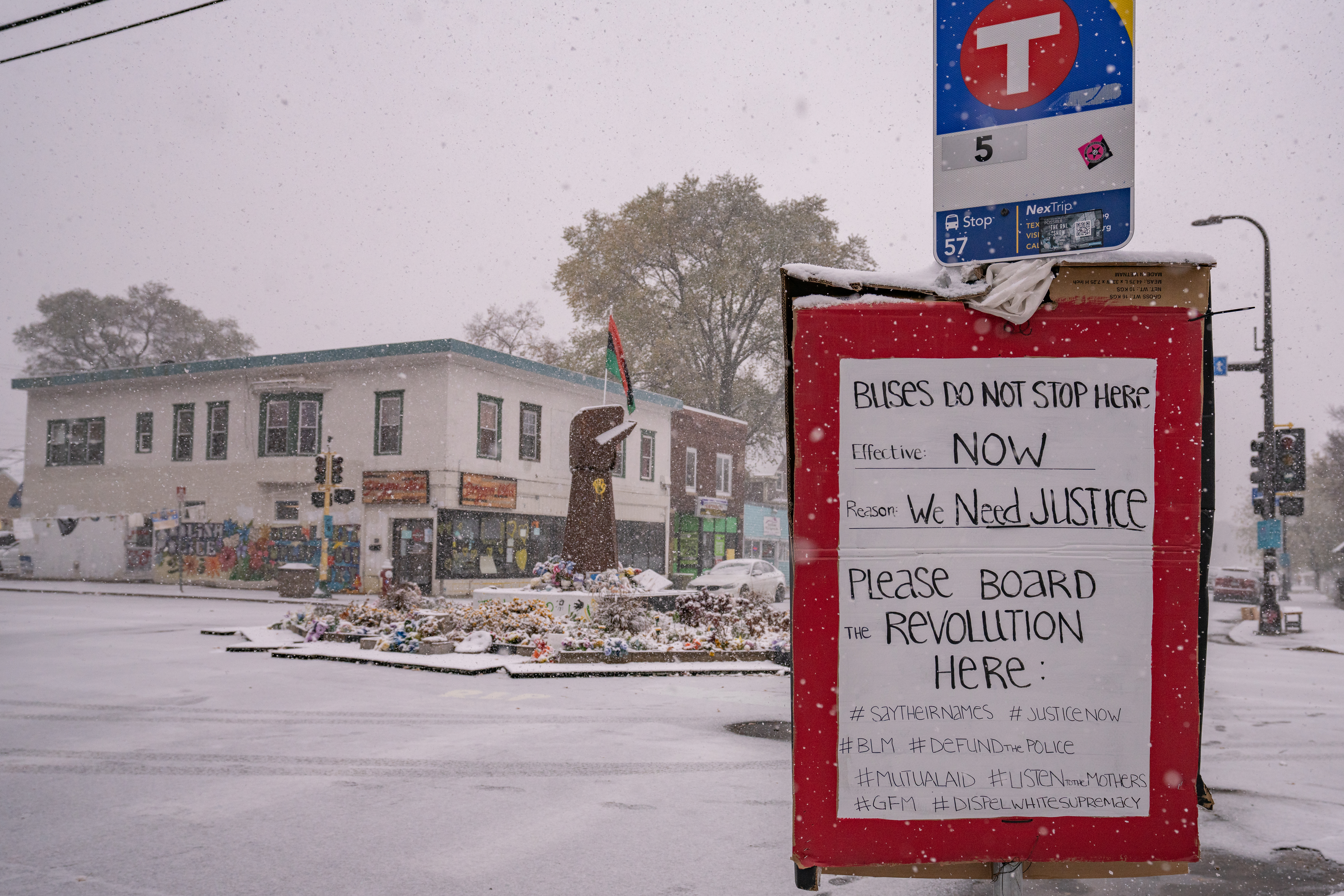
A closed bus stop at George Floyd Square, October 20, 2020

Several Black business owners at the intersection felt the city had abandoned them and failed to protect their safety and economic livelihood. They objected to the barricades and civilian gatekeepers who made unilateral decisions about who could enter the square. Nearly 10 months after the occupation began, the businesses had received no direct assistance from the city as compensation for barricading the area, and they felt that their tax dollars should not have been taken without the provision of basic services.

On March 12, 2021, the City of Minneapolis announced it had reached a $27 million wrongful death lawsuit settlement with Floyd's family. The city allocated $500,000 as part of the settlement "for the benefit of the community around 38th Street and Chicago Avenue". Floyd's family hoped it would help struggling Black-owned business in the area and encouraged others to match the donation. In late March 2021, the city created a $1 million small-business loan program to help struggling small business and nonprofit organizations at the square.

A group of Black-owned businesses at the intersection formed the 38th Street Black Business Collective in early April 2021 to advocate for financial assistance from the city and to re-open the intersection. The group said it had joined the community in calling for justice for Floyd, but they believed that the autonomous zone had "unintended economic downfall" for local business by using them as "sacrificial lamb". Group members blamed the closure of the intersection to traffic, reduced police presence, and rising crime as factors in reduced business revenue.

== Media coverage ==
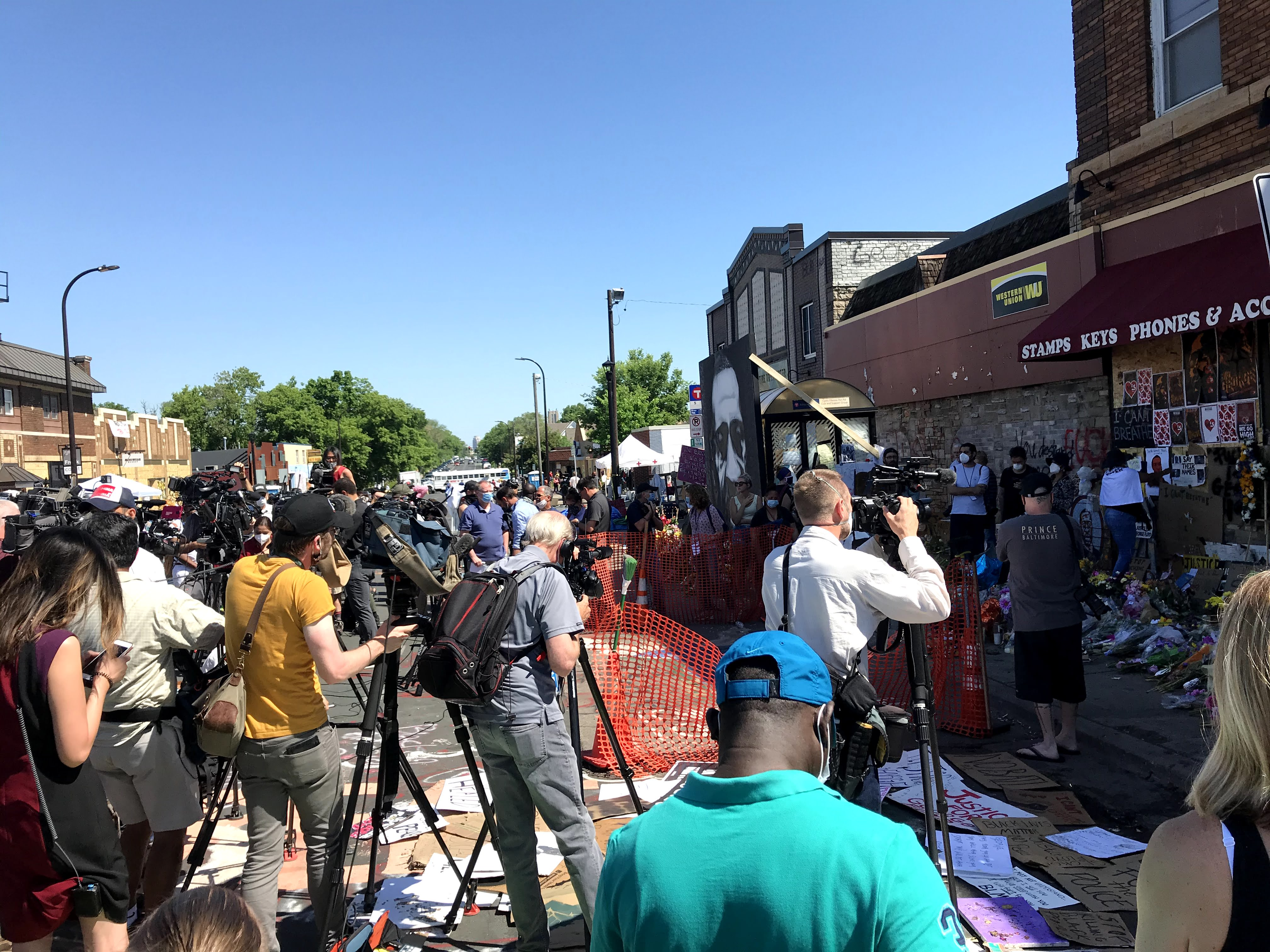
Local, national, and international media at the site on June 3, 2020.

The intersection has been the site of many protests, rallies, and demonstrations. It also served as a backdrop to media coverage on the protest movement sparked by Floyd's murder. In August 2020, it was subject of a multi-part PBS News Hour series, "George Floyd Square: The epicenter of a protest movement that's swept the world." In December 2020, it was the subject of a Minnesota Public Radio series, "Making George Floyd's Square: Meet the people transforming 38th and Chicago".

== See also ==
- 2020–2022 Minneapolis–Saint Paul racial unrest
- History of Minneapolis
- List of events and attractions in Minneapolis
- List of name changes due to the George Floyd protests
- Memorials to George Floyd
- Police abolition movement in Minneapolis
