= Aftermath of the George Floyd protests in Minneapolis–Saint Paul =

Aftermath of local civil unrest following murder of an unarmed black man

Aftermath of the 2020 Minneapolis–Saint Paul riots
- Part of George Floyd protests in Minneapolis–Saint Paul
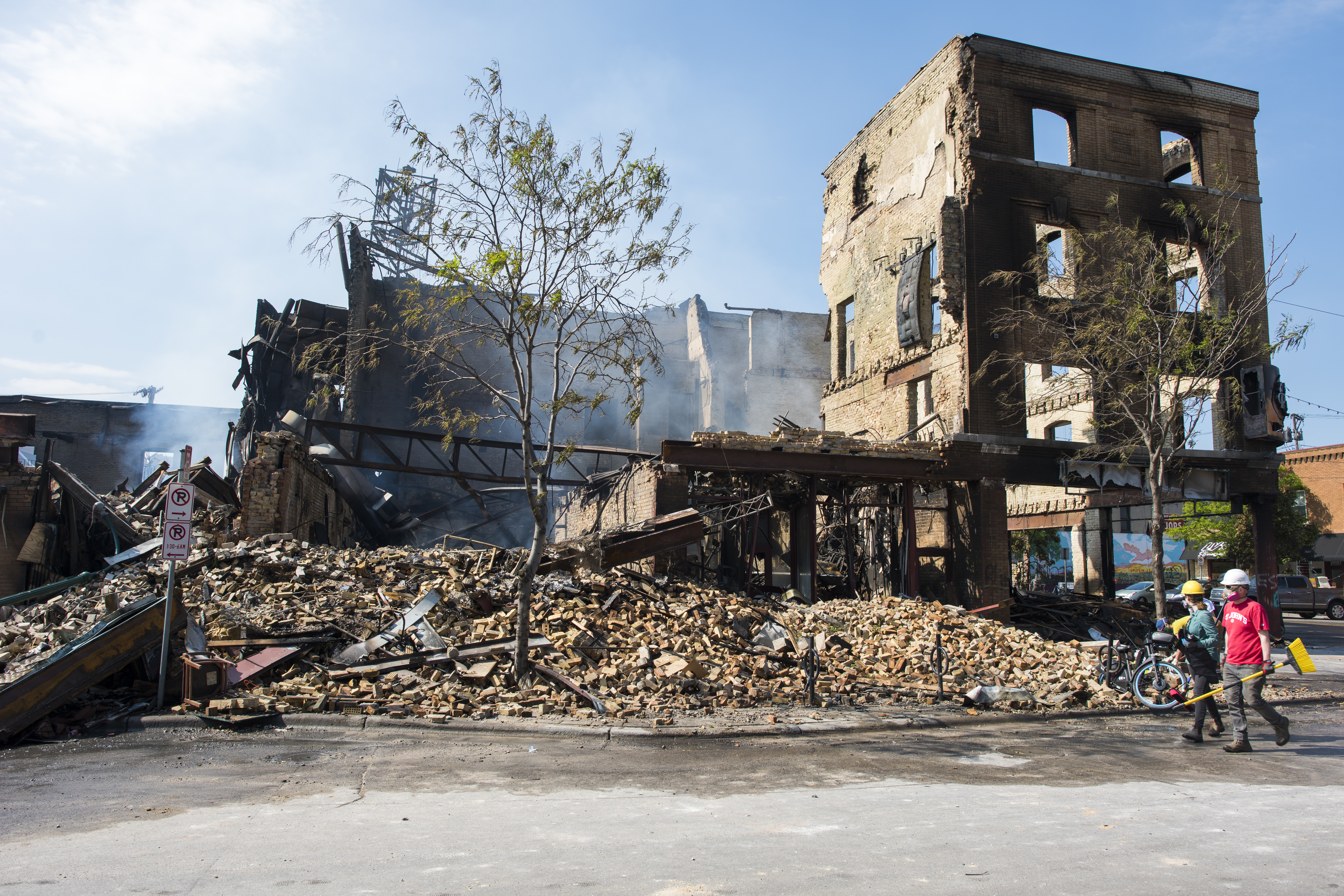
- Ruins on East Lake Street, May 30, 2020
- Date: Initial period of unrest: May 26 – June 7, 2020 (12 days); 6 years ago
- Location: Minneapolis–Saint Paul metropolitan area in the U.S. state of Minnesota
- Caused by: George Floyd protests
- Methods: Riots, demonstrations, civil disobedience, civil resistance, public art
- Status: Prolonged local unrest in 2020–2023

Result
- Deaths: Calvin Horton Jr.; Oscar Lee Stewart Jr.
- Arrested: 604 from May 27—June 2, 2020
- Damage: May 26—30, 2020: $500 million 1,500 property locations 164 structure fires from arson
- Charged: Federal: 17 for arson; 3 Boogaloo movement members; 1 for felony gun possession; State and local: 91 for felony burglary; 1 for criminal vehicular operation (charges dropped); 1 for attempted murder of police officers (acquitted at trial); 1 police officer for assault

The aftermath of the George Floyd protests in Minneapolis–Saint Paul describes the result of civil disorder between May 26 and June 7, 2020, in the Twin Cities metropolitan area of the U.S. state of Minnesota. Protests began as a response to the murder of George Floyd, a 46-year-old African-American man on May 25, after Minneapolis police officer Derek Chauvin knelt on Floyd's neck for 9 minutes and 29 seconds as three other officers assisted during an arrest. The incident was captured on a bystander's video and it drew public outrage as video quickly circulated in the news media by the following day.

Local events are sometimes referred to as the "Minneapolis riots" or the "Minneapolis uprising". Protests that first emerged in Minneapolis on May 26, 2020, were initially peaceful. A several-day period of civil unrest, particularly three nights of heavy rioting from May 27, 2020, to the overnight hours of May 29, 2020, however, resulted in an estimated $500 million of damages to 1,500 property locations, 604 arrests, 164 instances of arson, and 2 riot-related deaths. Minnesota Governor Tim Walz deployed the state's National Guard to quell civil disorder and protests over Floyd's murder returned to being mostly peaceful events after May 30, 2020. The state government's command that responded to the initial unrest after Floyd's murder demobilized on June 7, 2020, as protests and intermittent civil disorder over racial injustice persisted throughout 2020 and 2021.

Video footage of Floyd's murder and media coverage of the initial events in Minneapolis inspired a global protest movement against police brutality and racial inequality. The initial period of local unrest in Minneapolis, Saint Paul, and metropolitan suburban communities was the second most destructive in United States history, after the 1992 Los Angeles riots. By early June 2020, the events in Minneapolis and Saint Paul had been overlooked by national media as attention shifted to events elsewhere, but local residents and officials were left mired in the aftermath of historic unrest and property destruction amid an ongoing racial reckoning.

Investigations of demonstrators, police tactics, and the government response to civil unrest took place in the years afterwards.

== Background ==
=== Murder of George Floyd ===
On May 25, 2020, George Floyd, a 46-year-old Black American man, was murdered by Derek Chauvin, a 44-year-old White police officer, in Minneapolis, Minnesota, United States. Floyd had been arrested after a store clerk reported that he made a purchase using a counterfeit $20 bill. Chauvin knelt on Floyd's neck for over nine minutes while Floyd was handcuffed and lying face-down. Two other police officers, J. Alexander Kueng and Thomas Lane, assisted Chauvin in restraining Floyd. Lane had also pointed a gun at Floyd's head before he was handcuffed. A fourth officer, Tou Thao, prevented bystanders from intervening.

Floyd's murder led to worldwide protests against police brutality, police racism, and lack of police accountability.

== Response to civil disorder ==
=== Government actions ===
==== Attacks on bystanders and journalists ====
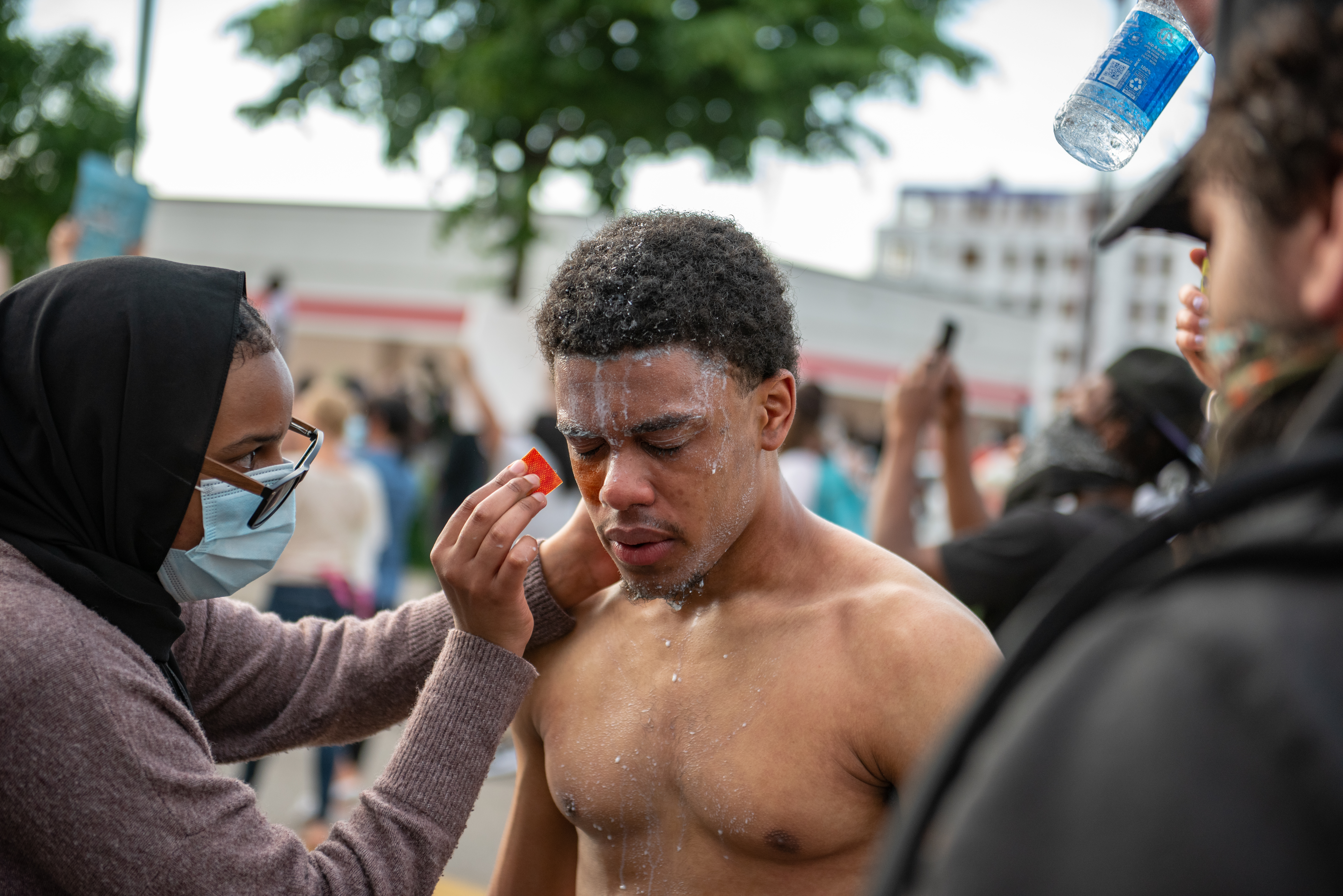
Street medics tend to a protester sprayed with chemical irritants in Minneapolis, May 27, 2020.

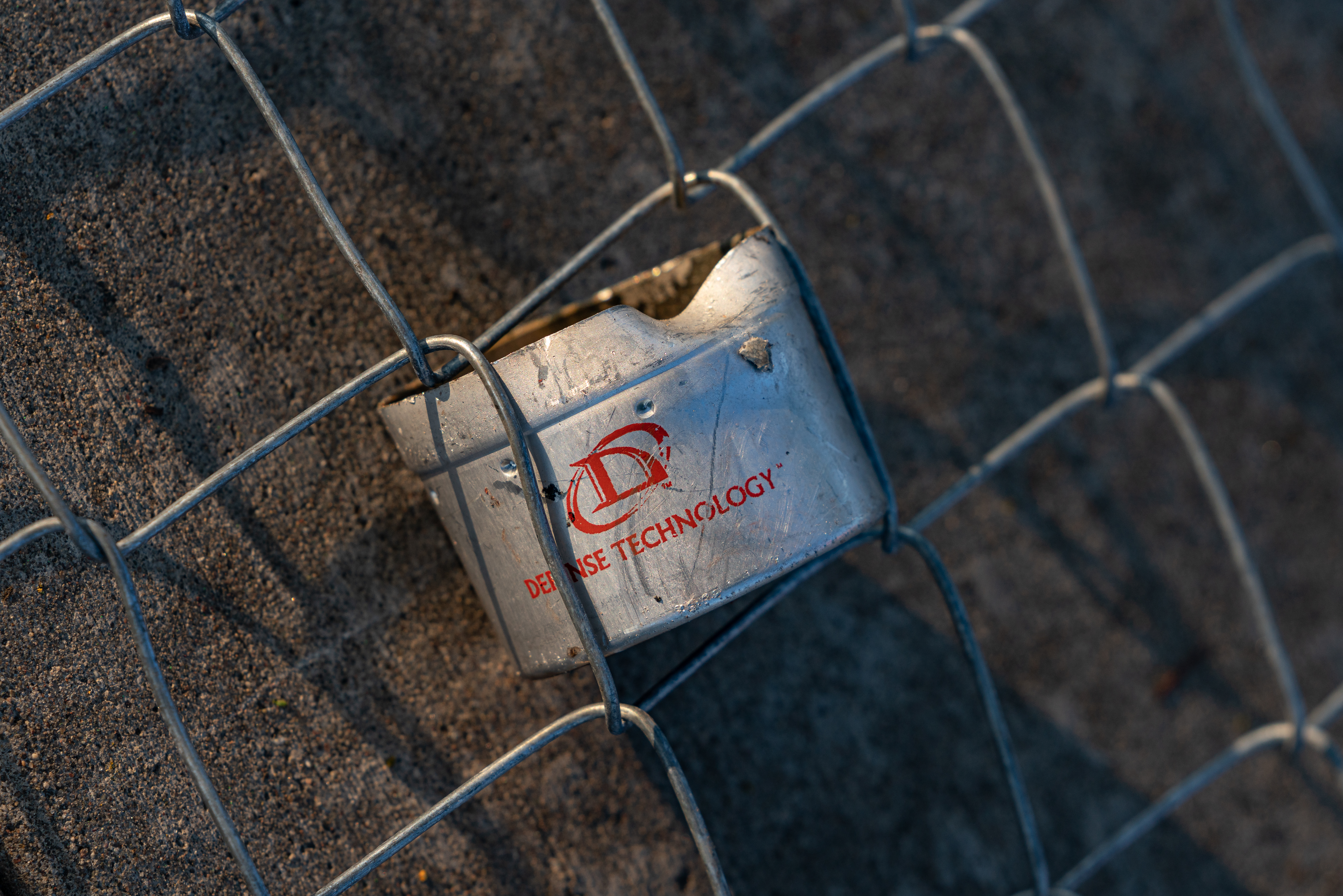
Discarded munition canister, May 30, 2020.

During the unrest, police forces fired tear gas and less-lethal munitions at crowds of people that included bystanders and reporters. Some activists said that several instances came without warning and were directed at groups demonstrating peacefully. Minneapolis police officers fired 5,200 less-lethal munitions rounds over six days of the initial unrest, and 57 people sought urgent care during protests in from May 26 to June 15, 2020, including 23 hit in the head or face, and 16 suffering traumatic brain injuries. A video of an incident that circulated online showed police officers enforcing curfew ordering residents on their porch to go inside, and after a few demands, firing paint rounds at the residents. The incident was one of 68 videos of excessive police force during George Floyd protests compiled by ProPublica. By June 2021, the Minnesota National Guard, Minnesota State Patrol, and Minneapolis Police Department had all denied involvement in the incident, and no officers faced discipline.

Over the first two weeks of the protests and unrest, 40 journalists were either attacked, had equipment damaged, or were arrested, according to data prepared by the U.S. Press Freedom Tracker. Linda Tirado, a photojournalist, was left blinded in one eye after being hit by a less-lethal bullet fired by Minneapolis police on May 29, while photographing police interactions with a crowd gathered after curfew. In 2022, the city settled a $600,000 lawsuit with Tirado.

On May 29, Swedish Expressen correspondent Nina Svanberg was shot with a rubber bullet and VG photojournalist Thomas Nilsson had a red laser sight trained on him. Tom Aviles, a photojournalist with WCCO-TV, was shot at with rubber bullets and arrested the evening of May 30 on live television. He was later released. In the morning of May 29, CNN reporter Omar Jimenez and his camera crew were arrested by Minnesota State Patrol officers as Jimenez reported live on television. After intervention from Minnesota Governor Tim Walz, most of crew was released an hour later. A security guard from the CNN crew was jailed for over 20 hours for allegedly breaking curfew and for illegal gun possession. He filed a $500,000 civil rights suit in U.S. District Court that alleged he was targeted for being Black. The security guard dropped the suit in December 2021 and no criminal charges had been filed against him related to the unrest. Video of a parking lot at Lake Street and Nicollet Avenue captured uniformed state patrol officers on May 30 slashing tires of unoccupied vehicles parked near protests, including those of several journalists covering the unrest.

==== Executive orders and declarations ====
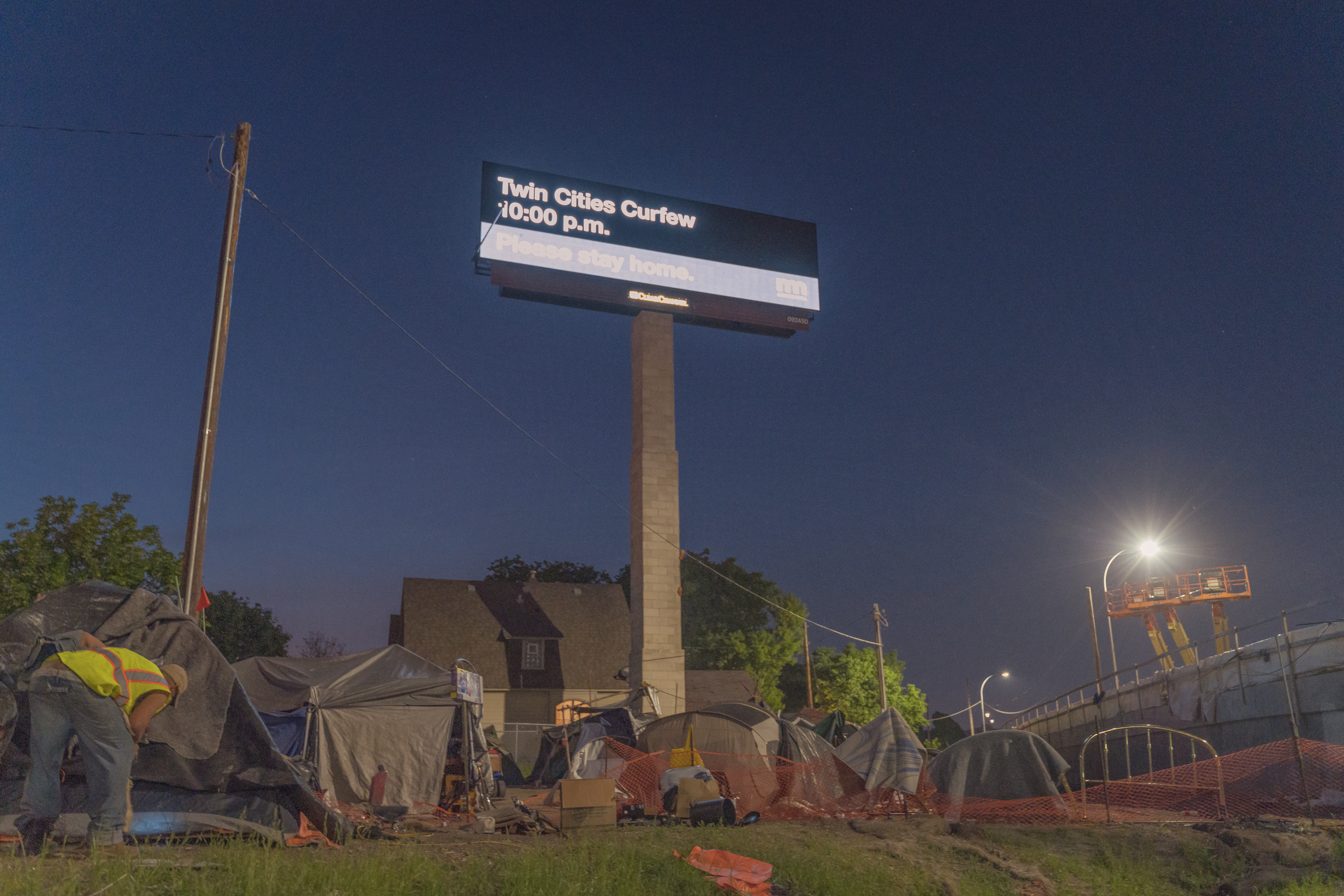
Curfew notice on a billboard near 1st Avenue South and the Midtown Greenway, June 1, 2020.

State and local officials issued several orders and declarations during the course of events. On May 28, Walz issued an executive order declaring a peacetime emergency in Minnesota due to the civil unrest, which stood up the state's emergency operations center and activated the Minnesota National Guard. Minneapolis mayor Jacob Frey and Saint Paul mayor Melvin Carter also declared local emergencies in their cities the same day. The state imposed nightly curfews in the cities of Minneapolis and Saint Paul beginning on Friday, May 29 to keep people off the streets. Several metro area cities also set curfews of their own. The curfew in Minneapolis prohibited all forms and modes of travels with exceptions for those who needed to travel for work. Those breaking curfew faced fines of up to $1,000 or 90 days in jail. Officials hoped that the curfew would "isolate those who have criminal intent from those who do not". Curfews that started on Friday, May 29, were in effect from 8 p.m. to 6 a.m. By Monday, June 1, as nights grew calmer, curfews were shortened to 10 p.m. to 4 a.m. and extended through the night of Thursday, June 4. Curfews fully ended one week after being put in place, on June 5.

The Minneapolis City Council and Hennepin County passed resolutions declaring racism a public health emergency. The Minneapolis City Council resolution, approved July 17, 2020, outlining a series of action steps to address racial equity in the city. The city's resolution asserted that racism leads to discrimination in several areas of life, resulting in inequitable health outcomes for people of color for a variety of conditions and diseases. The resolution referenced studies showing that Black people are three times more likely to be killed by police. While the declaration in Minnesota, and elsewhere in the United States, was the result of Black scholars and Black activists seeking acknowledgement of systemic racism, some critics questioned what would happen next. The resolution in Minneapolis called for greater investments in housing, community development, youth programs, and small businesses to advance the interests of the city's residents who are Black, Indigenous, and people of color.

==== Surrender of a police station ====
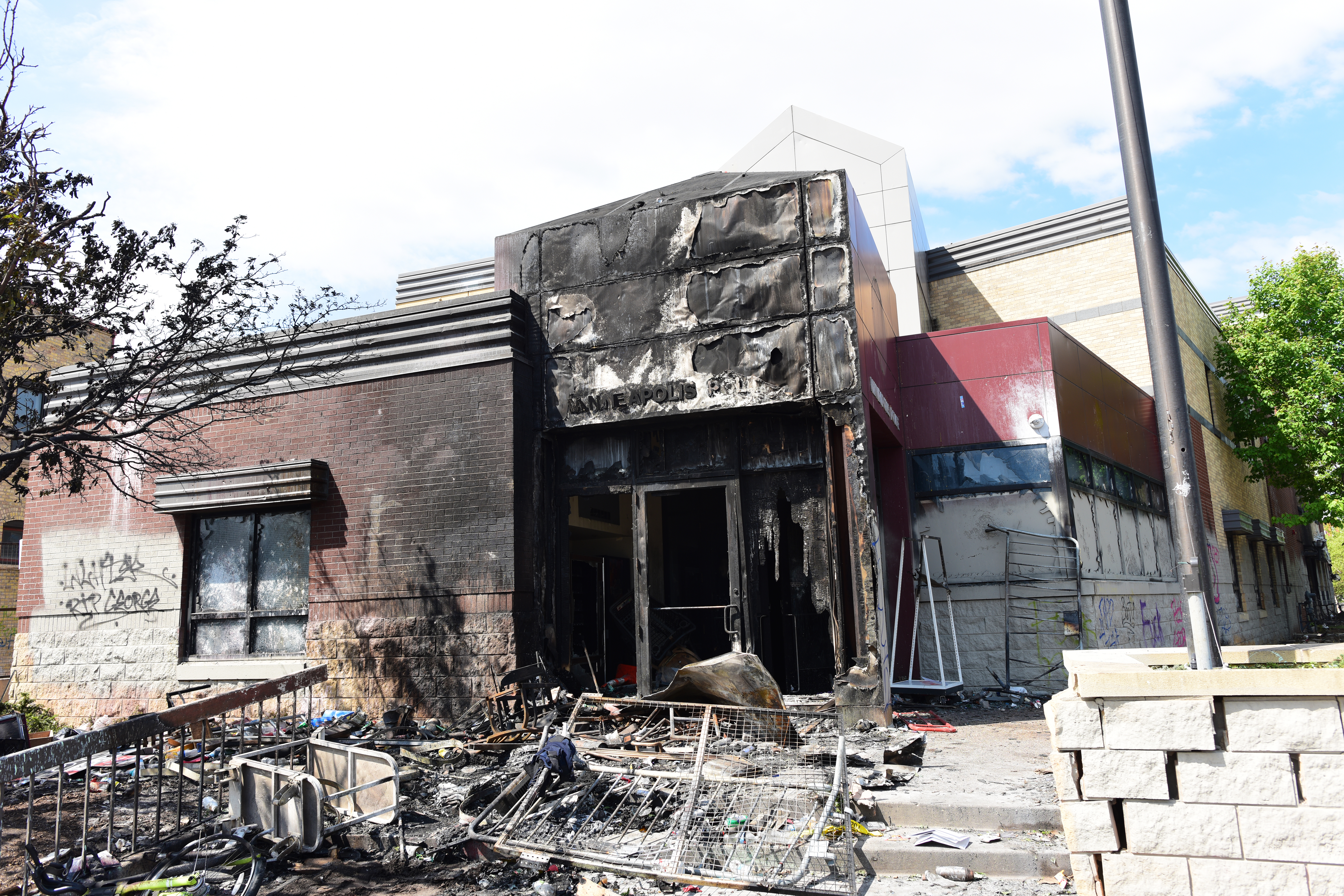
The destroyed third precinct station in Minneapolis, May 30, 2020.

Built in 1985, the third precinct station in south Minneapolis was overrun by demonstrators and officially lost on May 28, 2020. It is a matter of debate whether the decision by city officials to abandon it helped save lives or inspired more violence. Minneapolis police chief Medaria Arradondo, and other city leaders prepared as early as May 27 for the possibility of surrendering the station, which had been the location of tense protests beginning the evening of May 26, a day after Floyd's arrest and murder. According to Frey, after the precinct building was breached the city faced the choice of hand-to-hand combat with demonstrators that could result in more death, or forces could make a hasty departure and leave the building to the crowd, the latter of which happened in dramatic fashion as it was captured on live video. The image of an abandoned police station being set on fire by demonstrators was said to symbolize the collapse of order in Minneapolis and the failure of the police's relationship with the community. Hennepin County officials estimated tin July 2020 that he cost to replace the police station, either at the prior location or at a new location, was $10 million. Those who were charged and later pled guilty for their role in destroying the building were ordered to pay $12 million in restitution.

As a crowd breached the third precinct station on May 28, 2020, five miles (8 km) away at the second precinct police station in northeast Minneapolis, officers feared their station might be breached next, and began destroying documents with sensitive law enforcement information. In the days that followed, however, demonstrators focused their attention on the fifth precinct police station instead on Lake Street.

==== National Guard deployment ====
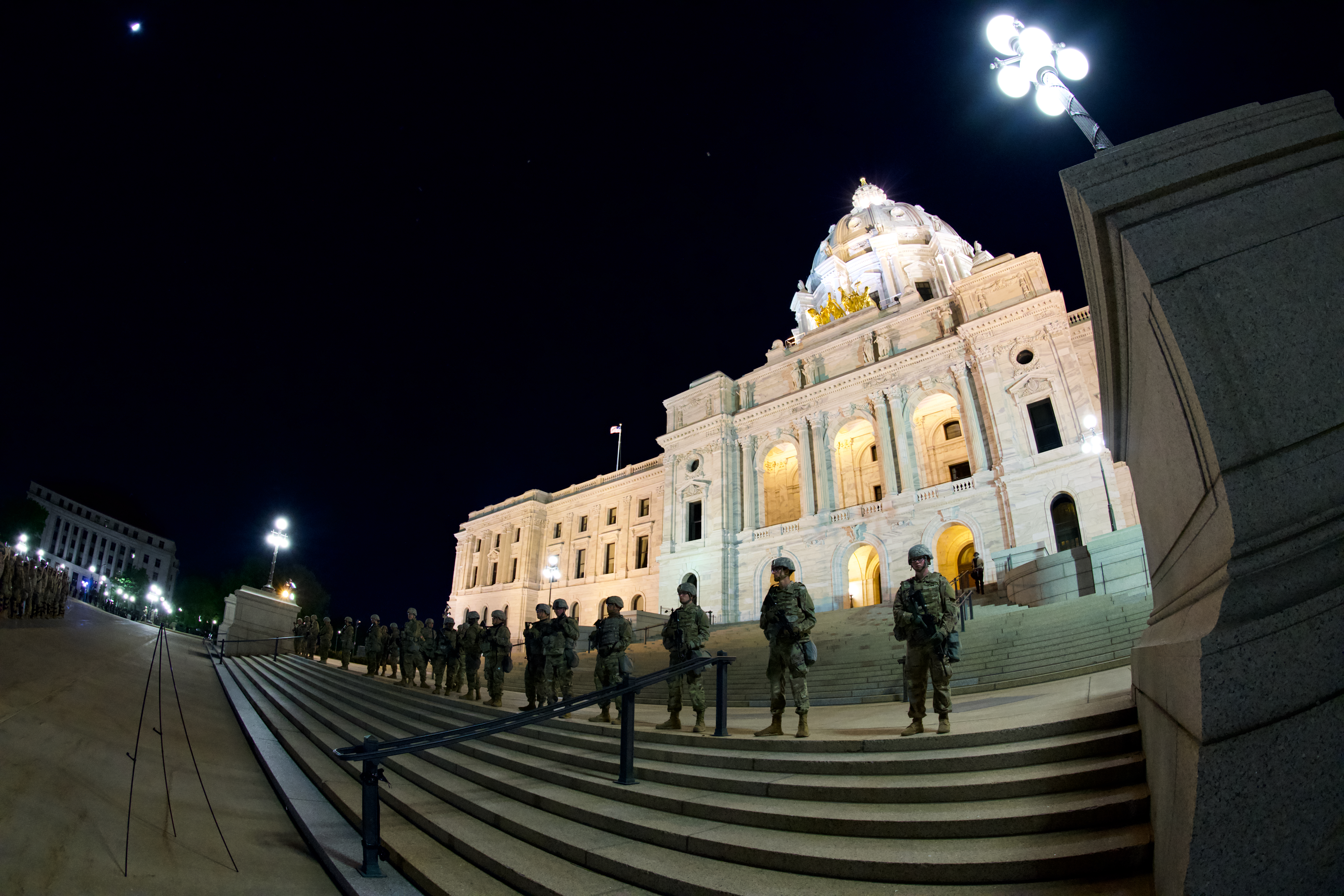
Minnesota National Guard and local law enforcement stand guard at the state capitol building in Saint Paul, May 30, 2020.

After the protests turned violent, 7,123 members of the Minnesota National Guard were pressed into duty in the Twin Cities. The deployment, commanded by Major General Jon A. Jensen, was state's the largest since World War II. The mission was to support local law enforcement, safeguard the state capitol building, and protect the right of people to protest. The delayed arrival of troops to areas of unrest later received criticism for "lagging" in its response to the riots. After being activated by Walz on May 28, Jensen claimed he and other guardsman were not provided clear directions by Walz on how to respond to the protests and riots. It was noted that no guardsmen were present during rioting on May 29, which destroyed numerous businesses in Minneapolis; streets were not cleared until the next day. It was not until the night of May 30 that the state's National Guard deployment was fully mobilized, after which street violence began to subside and the protests returned to being largely peaceful events.

During the guard's mobilization, troops were fully armed because of credible threats authorities had picked up, but the troops did not fire on any people. Troops had 18 minor injuries during the course of deployment, none of which were the result of altercations with demonstrators.

==== State command and patrol mobilization ====
A multi-agency government command that responded to the riots and unrest demobilized on June 7, 2020. The government response was led by Minnesota Department of Public Safety and had participation of federal agencies, Minnesota National Guard, Minnesota Department of Public Safety, Minnesota State Patrol, and Minnesota Department of Natural Resources. In addition to the 7,123 National Guard troops who were pressed into duty, the state also mobilized 575 state patrol troopers and 190 conservation officers for the riot response. Chain-link fencing and cement barricades, however, remained wrapped around the Minnesota capitol building in Saint Paul for nearly a year later, until June 1, 2021.

==== Mass arrests ====
Officials had trouble identifying the people responsible for causing destruction as the peaceful protests transitioned to riots. Law enforcement recovered incendiaries, weapons, and stolen vehicles left in the areas of heated protests. The multi-agency law enforcement command center for the Twin Cities announced that 604 protesters had been arrested as of June 2. Several hundred of those arrested were described as participating in peaceful protests, but were taken into custody at night for violating curfew. Analysis of state and federal criminal charges found that disorganized crowds had no single goal or affiliation, many opportunist crowds amassed spontaneously during periods of lawlessness, and that people causing destruction had contradictory motives for their actions.

=== Community actions ===
==== Boarding up ====
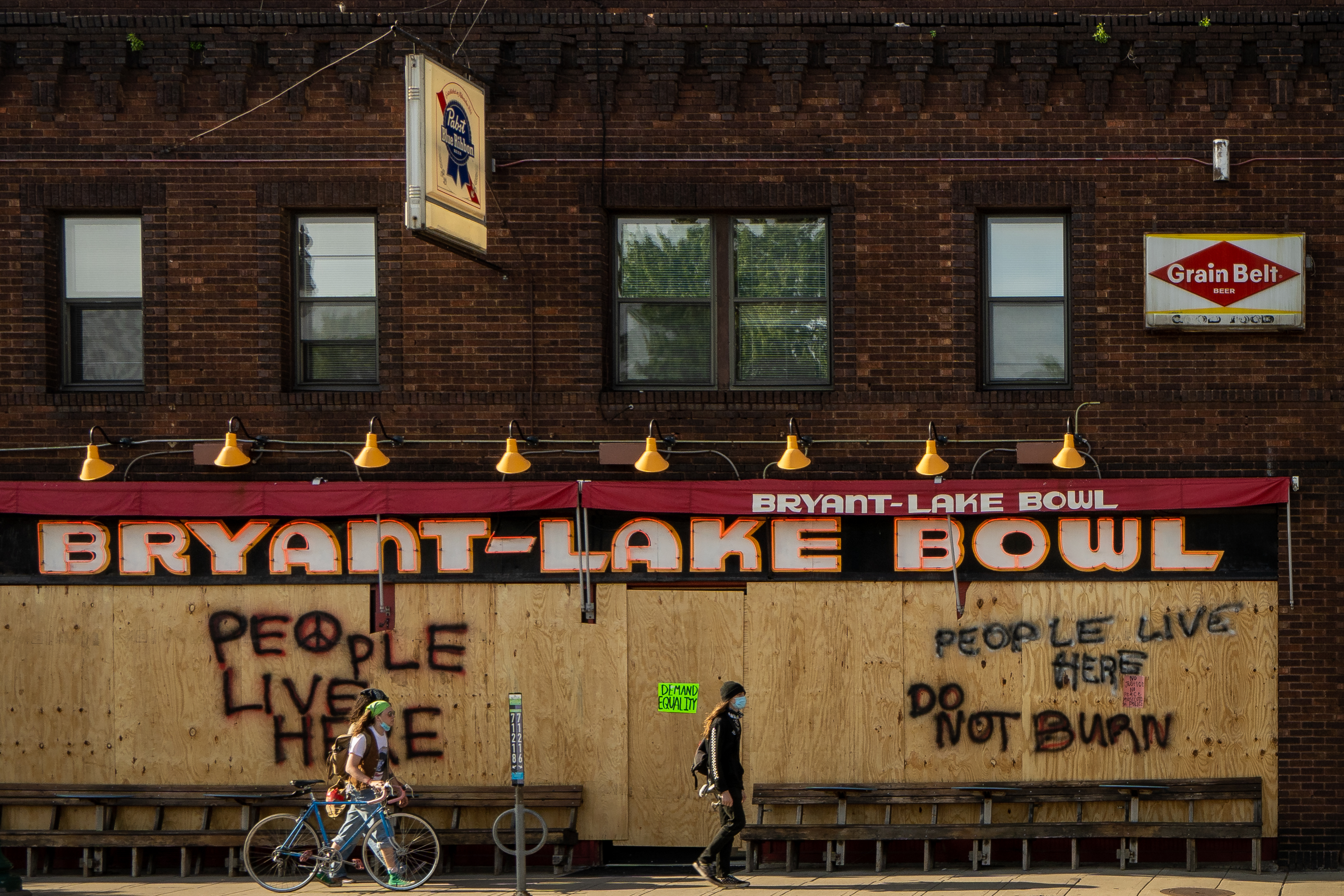
Boarded-up store front in Minneapolis, May 31, 2020.

Many business owners put up plywood boards to cover windows and doors at their properties to prevent looting, particularly in the areas most impacted by civil unrest. Several establishments posted signs or painted on plywood doors that the business or organization was minority or black owned, or that it served American Indian youth. Some businesses were spared from destruction, such as a Nepalese restaurant on East Lake Street in Minneapolis that posted such signs, but others were destroyed by fire despite similar notices, such as a nearby Indian restaurant and barbershop. One business owner of a distillery near the Minneapolis third precinct station credited "black owned" signs for preventing fires at part of his business complex. Desperate residents in mixed-use buildings and those living in above-floor apartments over store fronts posted "do not burn" and "people live here" signs to dissuade demonstrators from torching the property.

==== Public art ====
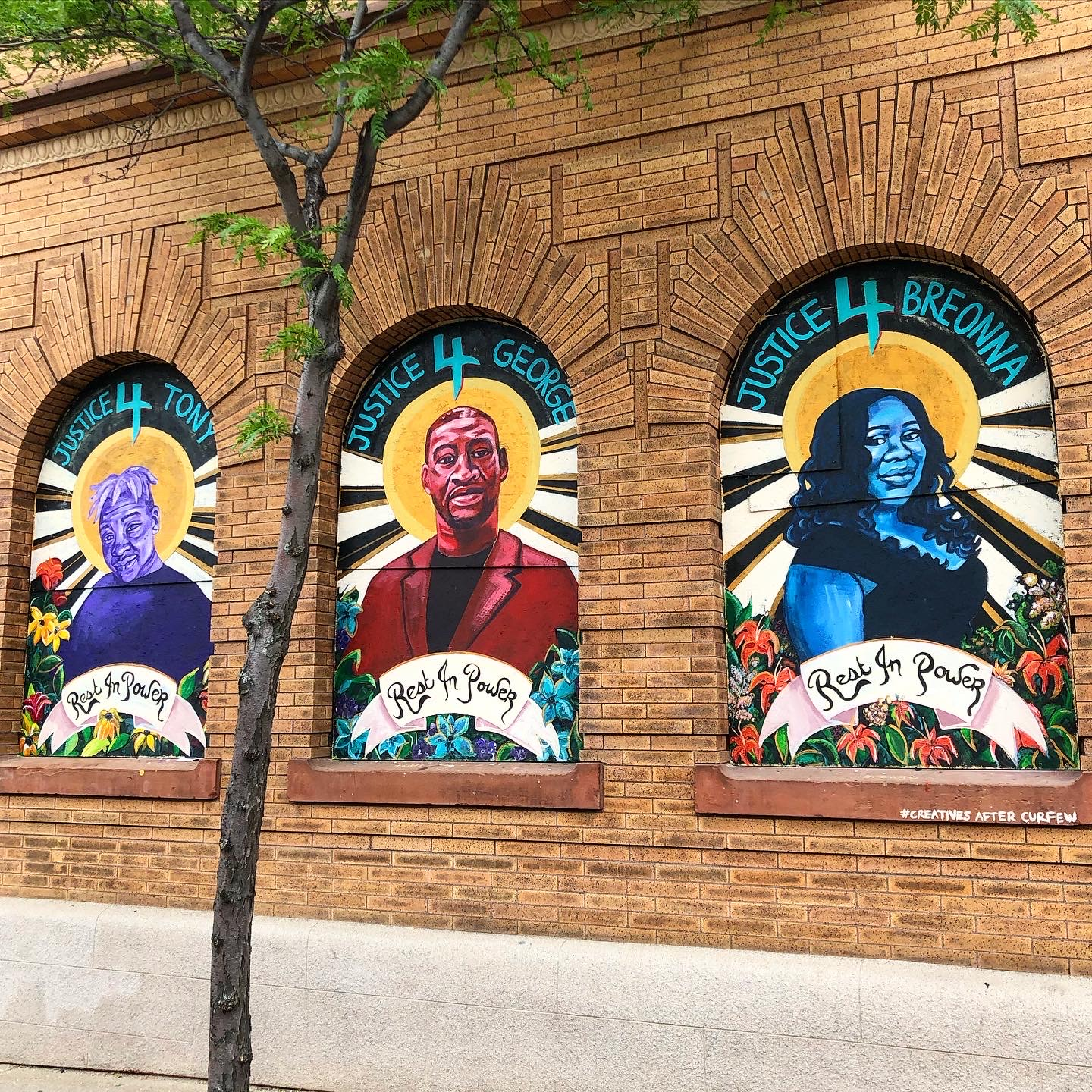
Murals in Minneapolis, June 15, 2020.

Vibrant works of arts appeared all over the Twin Cities that honored George Floyd's memory and showed community solidarity. Boarded-up buildings were described as canvasses for artists, and so were walls, sidewalks, and public property. In a grassy field near the location of Floyd's murder, artists erected a symbolic cemetery with 100 gravestone markers of African-Americans, including of Floyd, who were killed by police. A mural of George Floyd on the side of the Cup Foods grocery store became one of the most recognizable images of the global protest movement that was sparked by his murder, and a digital rendering of it served as a backdrop to his casket at his funeral in Houston, Texas. The work, created by white artists, drew some criticism for being created without the input of people of color and the nearby community, and it started a discussion about representation in the artist response to Floyd's murder. A group of local artists using the name Creatives After Curfew, who were predominately Black, Indigenous, and People of Color painted murals on boarded-up business through the Twin Cities after raising money for paint supplies through several campaigns, and their works featured messages calling for justice and expressing pride for minority-owned businesses. Volunteers from the artist community gathered and preserved over 900 works of art on plywood panels that covered up buildings and doors of Twin Cities' businesses. Save the Boards, a nonprofit organization based in Minneapolis, was formed to collect and preserve street and murals on boards.

==== Safety patrols ====
Residents awoke many mornings during the heaviest rioting to find nearby restaurants, liquor stores, and other businesses had been set on fire. In Minneapolis, the Longfellow, Powderhorn, and Phillips communities were heavily affected by the events. Reports and videos of residents confronting the people causing damage circulated, as did rumors about who might be responsible for the violence. Some residents felt the city and law enforcement had abandoned them, so they carried bats and sticks to protect their homes and businesses. On Saturday, May 30, Minneapolis city counselors hosted community meetings in public parks and helped residents initiate block-by-block plans to monitor disruptive activity.

The American Indian Movement and local business owners organized group patrols around the Little Earth community of up to 100 volunteers each night of the larger protests, which was credited with saving more than 20 businesses on Franklin Avenue. Little Earth community members later paid for lights at a park and trained community members in de-escalation tactics, efforts some hoped would serve as a new model for policing in the city.

Many small business owners and organization leaders stood guard at their buildings overnight during the heaviest rioting. Some intervened to dissuade rioters from destroying property while others carried firearms.

==== Cleaning up ====
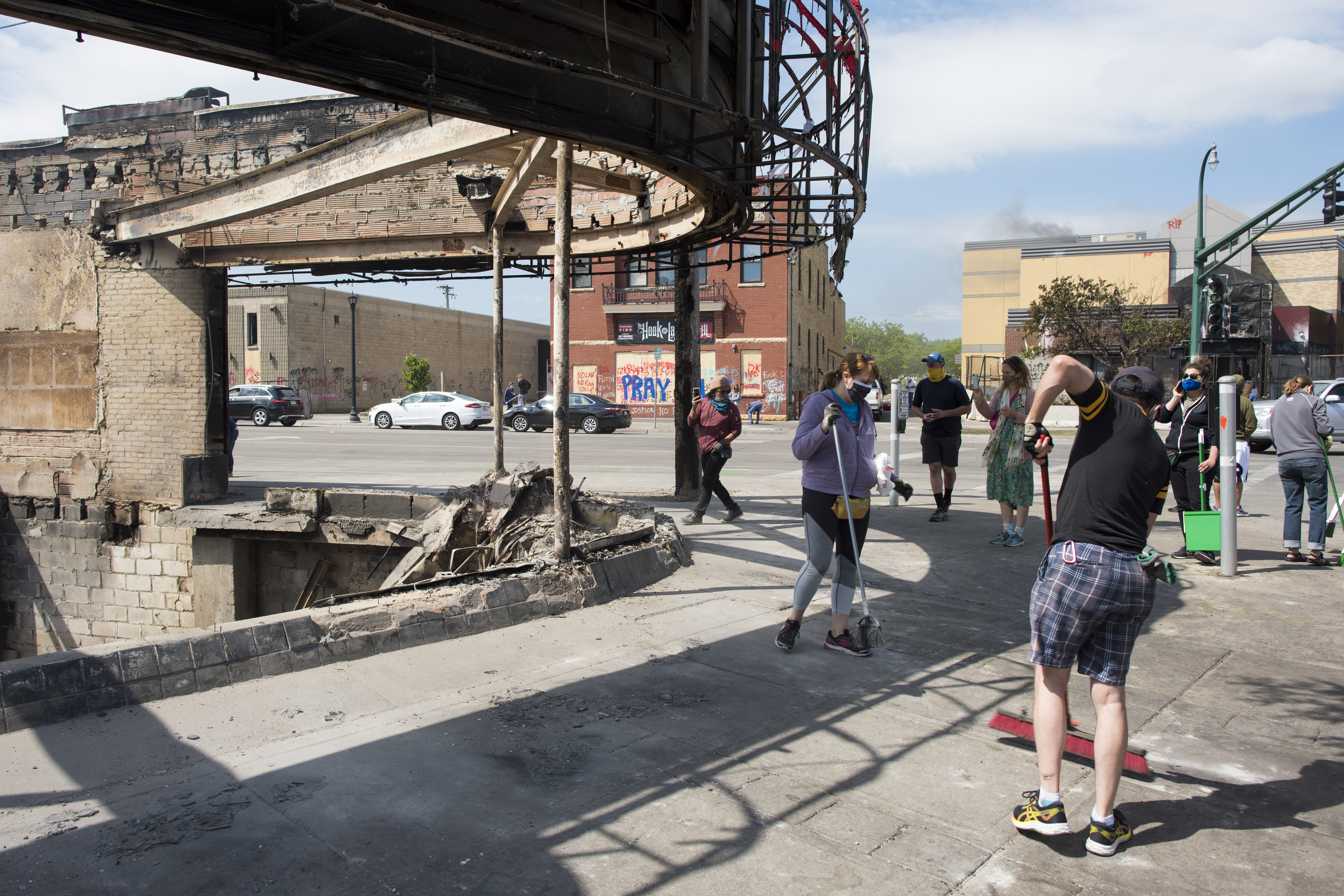
People clean sidewalks of debris in Minneapolis, May 30, 2020.

Each morning, hundreds of residents, some with snow shovels and brooms, went to areas affected by overnight rioting to clean up trash, graffiti, broken glass, and the remnants of damaged buildings. Some residents participating in the clean up were devastated by the damage, but shared the sense of anger and solidarity over Floyd's murder. Other participants said that cleaning up helped calm intense emotions about the events. Organizers of clean up events said they were partially motivated by a worry that the protests would only be defined only by looting and vandalism and not messages about justice.

==== Food drives ====
In the areas of heavy rioting, many local stores were closed after being looted and burned, and food pantries were overwhelmed. A small food drive at a middle school in Minneapolis aimed to fill 85 bags of food to help families, but organizers ended up with a line of vehicles stretching 14 city blocks and 20,000 bags of bread, fruit, and other items. A food drive in the Little Earth community resulted in enough packages of food and diapers to serve 1,000 residents and 7,500 people from the nearby neighborhoods. Many organizations, overwhelmed by the volume of donations, had to turn them away.

== Property damage ==
=== Arson, vandalism, and looting ===
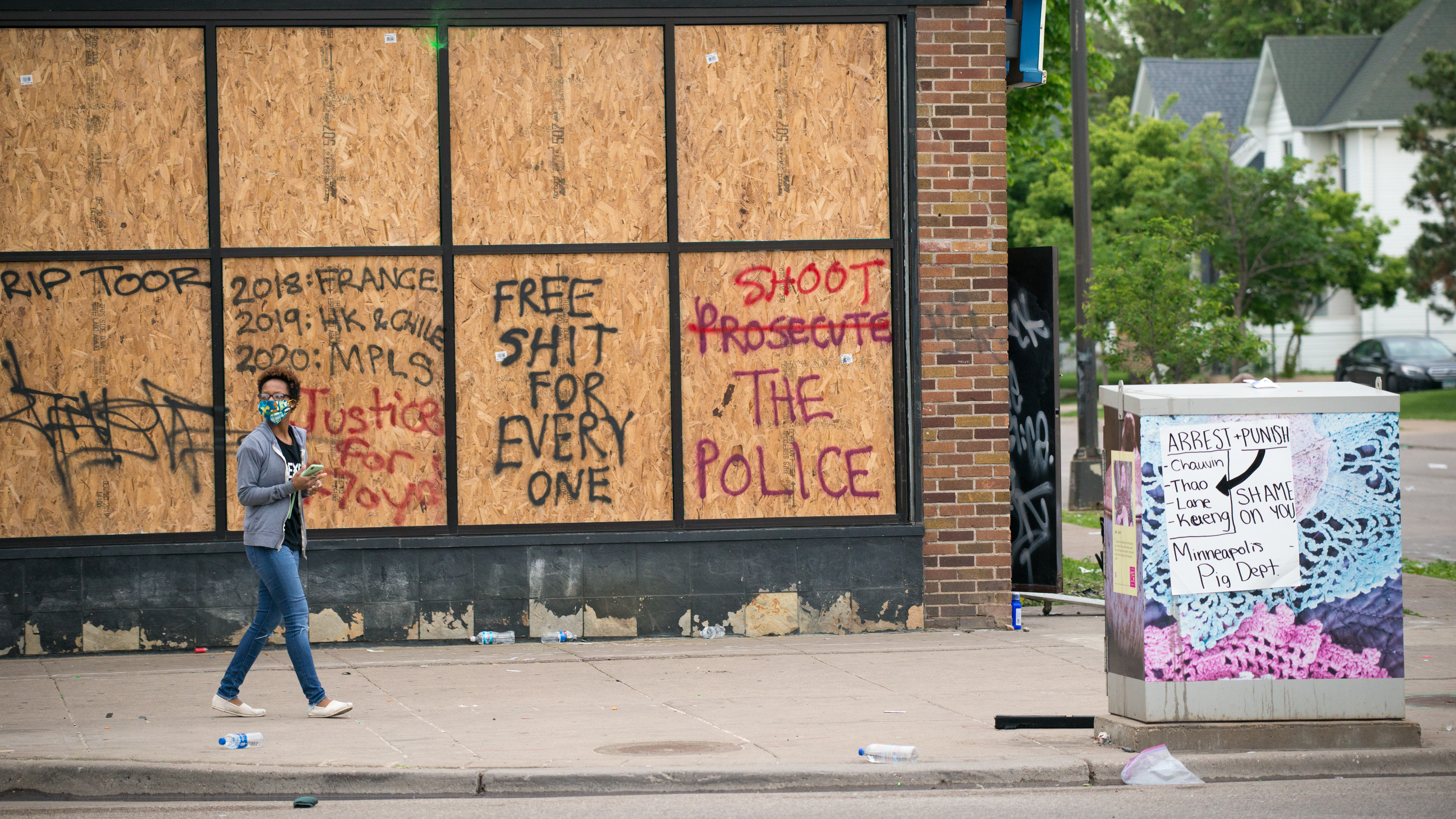
Graffiti on the boarded-up Max It Pawn shop in Minneapolis, May 27, 2020. It was looted and set on fire the following day.

In the days after George Floyd's murder, nearly 1,500 property locations in the Twin Cities were damaged by vandalism and looting, and dozens of others were completely destroyed by fire with some sites reduced to piles of rubble. Rioters in dense stretches of the cities smashed doors and windows of store fronts, covered surfaces with graffiti, vandalized structures, ransacked stores, and stole merchandize. Many stores were looted repeatedly over several days. The heaviest damage in Minneapolis occurred along a 5-mile (8.0 km) stretch on Lake Street between the city's third and fifth police precinct stations and in Saint Paul along a 3.5-mile (5.6 km) stretch of University Avenue in the Midway area. During the riots, Minnesota National Guard forces and law enforcement focused on protecting large institutions such as the Federal Reserve, power plants, and state capitol building. Officials acknowledged the emphasis on strategic targets came at the expense of family- and minority-owned business, many of which were burned or plundered by looters.

In Minneapolis, approximately 1,300 properties were damaged by the rioting and looting, nearly 100 of which were destroyed or severely damaged. Property damages, which did not include loss of business inventory, were approximately $107 million, according to the Minneapolis Assessor's Office. Overall, the city estimated damages and losses were $350 million and affected 22,000,000 square feet (2,000,000 m^{2}) of commercial property. Three post office branches of the United States Postal Service were among the properties destroyed by fire during the riots. Thirty-five families lost their housing in buildings that were damaged by fire.

In Saint Paul, the unrest resulted in $82 million in damages and affected 330 buildings. The total dollar amount of damages did not include other long-term impacts such as lost business activity. Thirty-seven properties sustained major damage or were destroyed, about half of which were national chain stores. During the heaviest period of unrest, Saint Paul's fire department responded to 50 confirmed structure fires. The city's University Avenue corridor that sustained most of the damage featured many small businesses owned by people of color. More than 50 damaged business were owned by Asian-American people, some of whom resettled in the area after leaving war-torn countries. Many of those later charged federally for arson crimes were white Americans. Commenting on the racial dynamic, the St. Paul Pioneer Press said, "In St. Paul, the irony of self-proclaimed advocates — many of them white — arriving from outside the city to burn down large strips of ethnic neighborhoods in the name of racial justice hasn’t been lost on residents of the Midway."

Top property types damaged in Minneapolis and Saint Paul as of July 13, 2020
Type	Number damaged
Restaurant	267
Retail	207
Services	114
Grocery	85
Cellphone store	76
Fuel	63
Auto	60
Residence	53
Salon/barber	52
Health care	47

A database maintained by the Star Tribune newspaper found that restaurants were the property type suffering the greatest amount of damage, with 267 locations affected by the civil disorder. Many restaurant buildings were entirely destroyed by fire during the violence, including both locally owned, independent restaurants and several locations of fast-food chains such as Arby's, Domino's Pizza, Popeyes, Subway, and Wendy's.

Damage from rioting was reported in the suburban cities as far north as Blaine and as far south as Apple Valley. Clusters of damaged storefronts also appeared in the suburban cities of Richfield, North Saint Paul, Maplewood, Brooklyn Center, and Roseville. Estimates of property damage in the region were upwards of $500 million, making the unrest in the Minneapolis-Saint Paul area the second most destructive in United States history, after the 1992 Los Angeles riots. Local officials estimated that rebuilding damaged business corridors in the Minneapolis-Saint Paul region could take 10 years.

=== Rebuilding and recovery ===
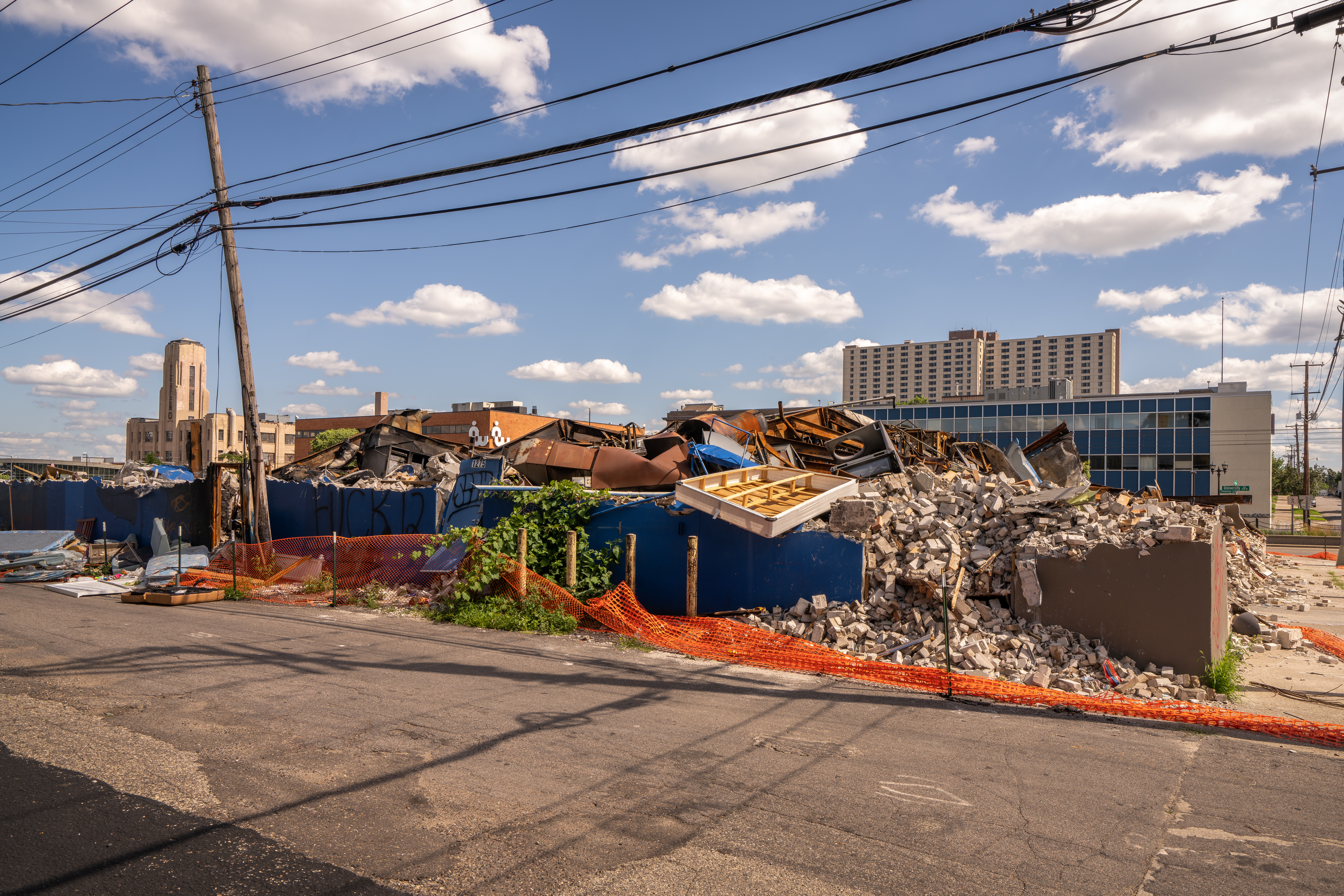
Several destroyed storefronts at University Avenue and North Syndicate Street in Saint Paul, July 7, 2020

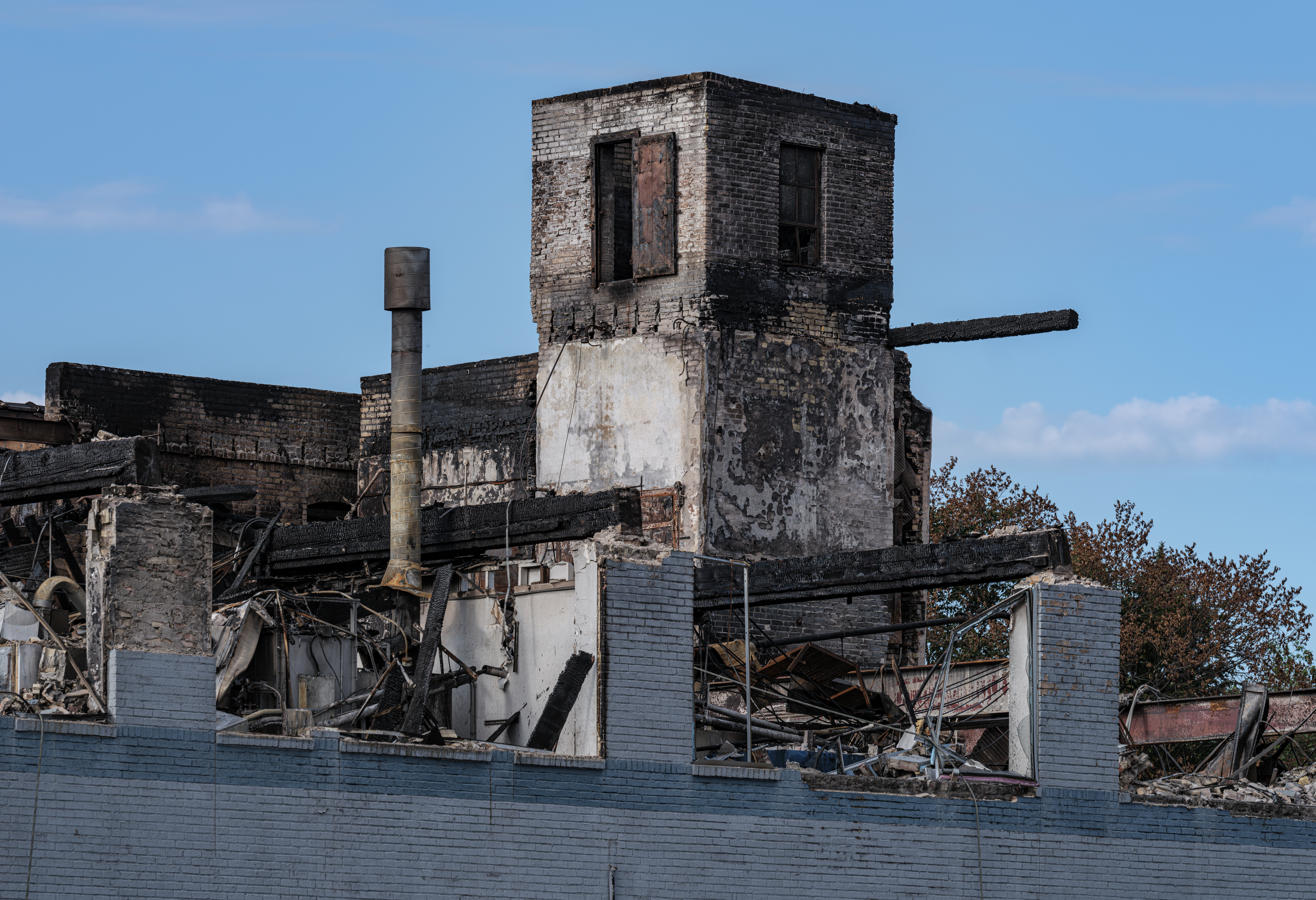
Ruins of the 7-Sigma factory destroyed by May 27 riots in Minneapolis, June 13, 2020.

Economic conditions for people and businesses worsened in Minneapolis and Saint Paul after the riots. Local and minority-owned business were disproportionately affected by both the COVID-19 pandemic and the unrest after the murder of Floyd. Losses not covered by private insurance were about $200 million, or 40%, of the estimated $500 million in property damages. Many businesses that were damaged or destroyed lacked insurance or were under insured to recover loses. Some other residents and business owners worried that outside investors would seek to displace local businesses during the rebuilding process.

Governor Walz requested federal aid of around $15 million, the amount potentially eligible for reimbursement to mitigate fire damage, from the Federal Emergency Management Agency on July 2, 2020. In order for the request to be approved, President Donald Trump would have needed declare a "major disaster" for the state of Minnesota. The federal government, however, denied the request a few days later, leaving the state with the difficulty of addressing the financial impacts from property damage amidst a state budget crisis caused by the COVID-19 pandemic. Trump later said at an August 18, 2020, campaign rally in Mankato, Minnesota, that he denied the aid request as "punishment" to local officials. That decision contrasted with the disaster declaration and federal aid package of $638 million President George H.W. Bush approved following the 1992 riots in Los Angeles.

State and local officials vowed to help affected businesses by creating new financing initiatives to accelerate repair and recovery efforts. In Saint Paul, the Chamber of Commerce raised $1 million for small business rebuilding grants. Saint Paul officials also established a $3 million relief fund, but it was quickly depleted and officials looked to state and federal relief options by August 2020. The Lake Street Council had raised $12 million for distribution as small grants to help local business rebuild and recover in the East Lake Street corridor in Minneapolis that had been most impacted by arson and looting.

By August 2020, the vast majority of the heavily damaged sites were still left in ruins or dangerous piles of hazardous rubble as the city required business owners to be fully compliant with property taxes before issuing demolition permits. Frustrated and financially distressed business owners felt the city was discouraging reinvestment, especially as Saint Paul officials expedited demolition permits without a similar requirement. Minneapolis officials eventually waived the property tax requirement after the issue generated public scrutiny.

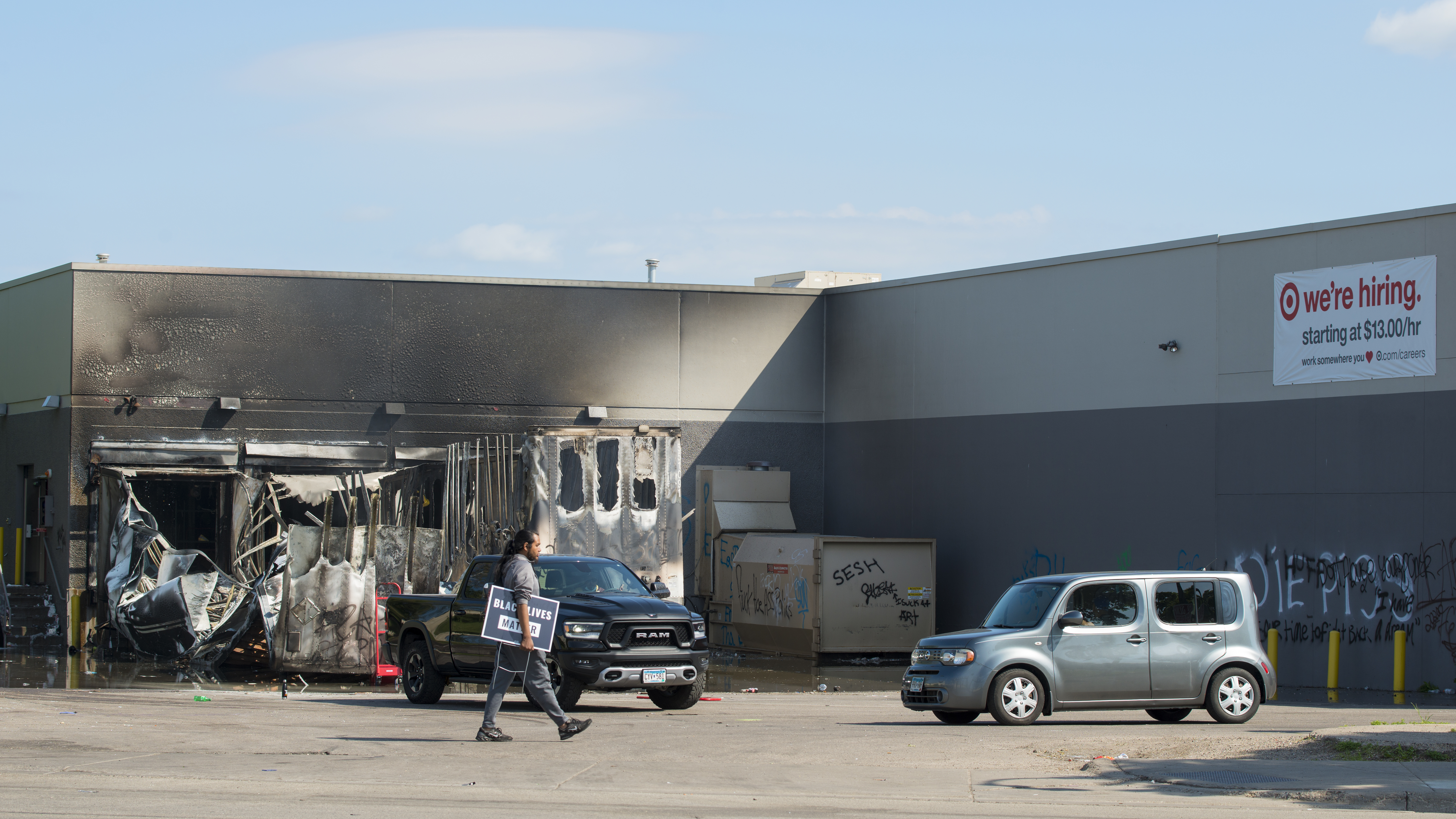
Fire damage to the Target store on East Lake Street in Minneapolis, May 30, 2020.

Several large businesses announced immediate plans to rebuild after the riots. Among them, the Target Corporation made a commitment to rebuild the store on East Lake Street that had been heavily damaged and looted, which it re-opened six months later in November 2020, and was followed by the re-opening of nearby stores Aldi, Family Dollar, and Cub Foods that had to be heavily renovated. The developer of Midtown Commons, the six-story, under-construction affordable housing building that burned down near the third precinct station, announced plans in June to start the project over, a process the developer said would take two years.

Many small business owners in the Twin Cities who were affected by the riots and looting found they had to pay for repairs and rebuilding out of their own pockets as insurance payments fell well short of amounts needed. A proposed $300 million Minnesota recovery fund, that included $168 million for small businesses and nonprofits to rebuild, did not receive backing from the state legislature in 2020 when Republicans who controlled the Minnesota Senate objected. In June 2021, state lawmakers agreed to a $150 million small business relief program, but it require businesses to seek an up-front, 2-to-1 match. It was also available to any business in the state for economic recovery and not focused on businesses affected by the riots in Minneapolis and Saint Paul. By the end of 2021, no business damaged during the unrest had received any state aid or loans. Only about $20 million of the state funds were earmarked for Minneapolis and $7 million for Saint Paul for rebuilding from the May 2020 riots. In Minneapolis, the communities along the Lake Street corridor, West Broadway in North Minneapolis, and the area around 38th and Chicago were the only ones eligible for the state funds.

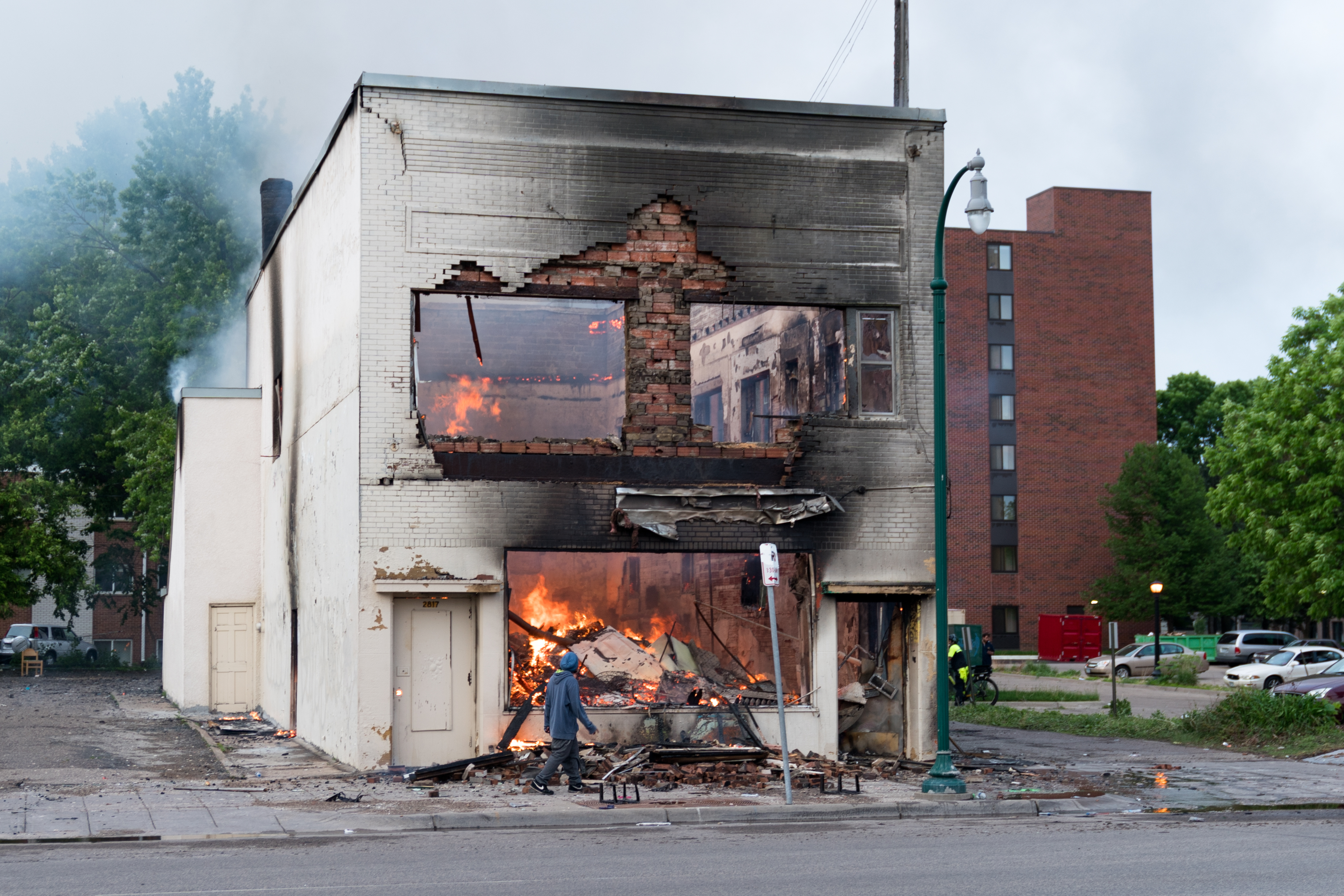
MetroPCS store with apartment units above on fire in Minneapolis, May 28, 2020.

The recovery process for many of the small, independent businesses that burned down near the third police precinct station at Lake Street and Minnehaha Avenue was described as slow. The owner of the Gandhi Mahal Restaurant near Minnehaha Avenue who famously said, "Let my building burn. Justice needs to be served," during the initial riots, became an international symbol of the unrest. However, six months later he was left paying for $80,000 in demolition costs out of pocket and was worried about his future. Demolition costs for many properties were between $200,000 and $300,000, which was more than the buildings were worth before being burned down. In August 2020, the City of Minneapolis agreed to demolish some properties and passed on the assessed cost to property owners; a $2 million hardship fund was set up for property owners that could not pay. Four months later the city had little to show for the efforts as some of the ugliest and most hazardous piles of rubble remained. The owners of Town Talk diner on East Lake Street sued the city for $4.5 million. The landmark restaurant burned down on May 28, 2020, after police vacated the third police precinct building and abandoned the East Lake Street area.

Some businesses said they would not rebuild and would disinvest from Minneapolis. One business that suffered heavy damage to its factory from the fires, 7-Sigma, which was located near the third police precinct building, said they would leave the city for good after losing trust in public officials during the riots. The restaurant chain Arby's said it would wait to rebuild its location that burned on East Lake Street near Hiawatha Avenue, citing the potential for unrest over the trial verdict of the four police officers responsible for Floyd's murder.

At about a year after the May 2020 riots, less than 5 percent of the businesses that were damaged or destroyed on East Lake Street in Minneapolis had reopened, according to the Lake Street Council that promoted business activity in the area. In Saint Paul, 35 of the 270 businesses damaged during the riots remained closed a year after the riots. The Midway Chamber of Commerce distributed aid to damaged business ranging from $1,000 to $50,000 from the $1 million it raised to support affected store owners. The Midway Shopping Center on University Avenue, which was damaged by fires and looting on May 28–29, 2020, permanently closed as Saint Paul city officials ordered it demolished, which resulted in several minority-owned businesses within the shopping center being forcefully closed that did not suffer fire damage to their storefront during the riots.

By the end of 2021, nearly $200 million in building permits were obtained for redevelopment of damaged properties along with Lake Street and West Broadway corridors in Minneapolis. Grants and economic aid from a variety of public, private, and non-profit sources had covered about $100 million of the roughly $200 million in uninsured property losses. After facing public opposition about the return of city police forces to the torched precinct building at East Lake Street and Minnehaha Avenue, city councilors in Minneapolis approved a plan in late 2023 to move into a new facility several blocks north.

By 2025, five years after the riots, 48 destroyed properties in Minneapolis were still vacant lots and damaged property buildings remained along Lake Street and other business corridors in the region.

== Criminal charges and legal proceedings ==
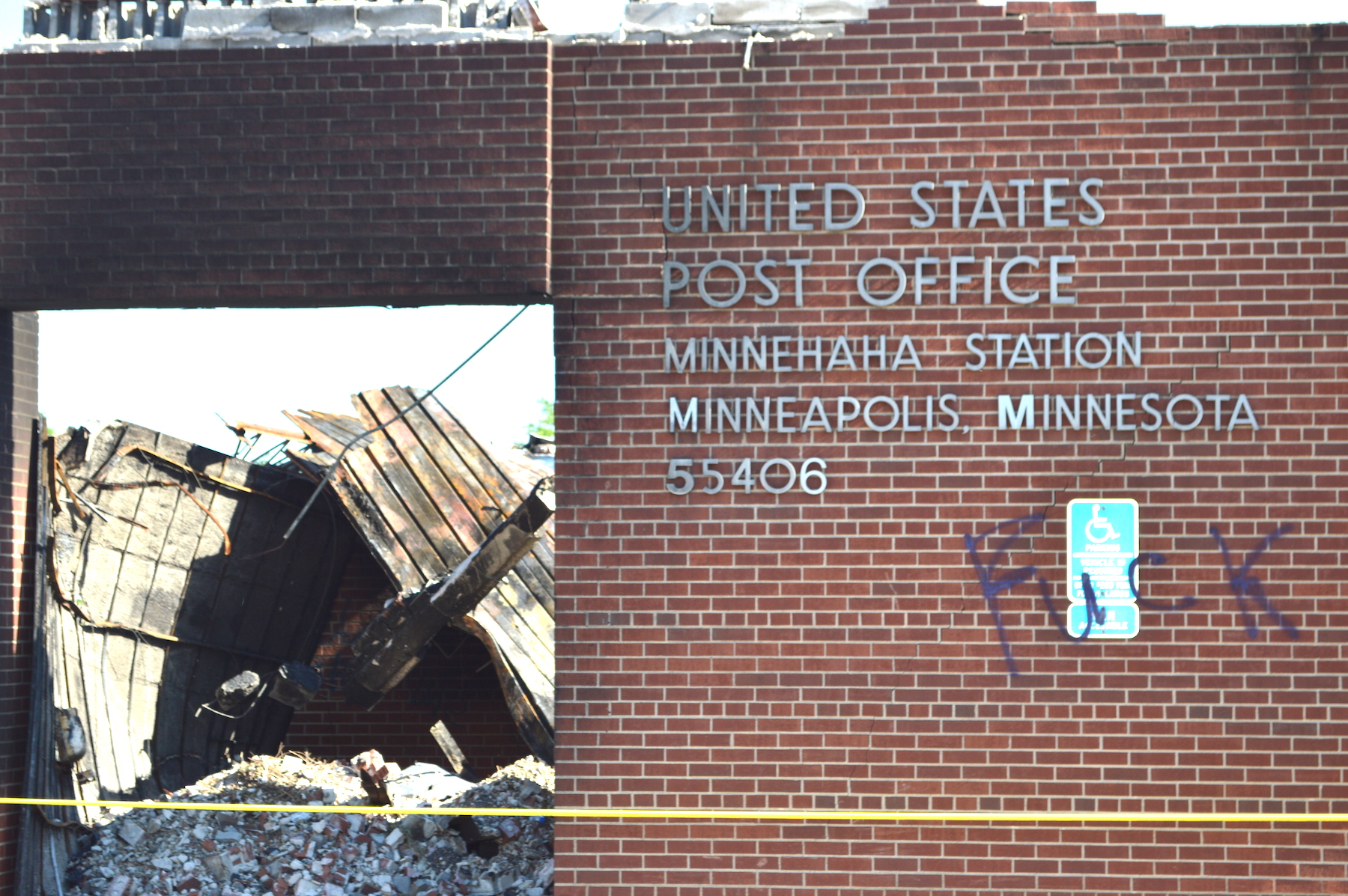
A destroyed U.S. Post Office building in Minneapolis, June 4, 2020.

=== State and local ===
==== Misdemeanor citations and curfew violations ====
Most protesters who were arrested during the late May and early June 2020 events were issued citations and quickly released. Charges against many who protested peacefully were later dropped. By November 2020, Minneapolis officials pursued charges for about 75 of 666 cases related to the unrest. In Saint Paul, 87 of the 100 people arrested during the unrest were for curfew violations, and City Attorney Lyndsey Olson said that cases would be dismissed for people engaging in peaceful protests that did not involve acts of violence. By a year later after the unrest, 95 percent of misdemeanor citations given to protesters had been dismissed.

In the immediate aftermath of Floyd's murder, former NFL star and civil rights activist Colin Kaepernick donated a "substantial" sum of money to a legal fund to defend protesters in Minnesota and elsewhere. The Minnesota Freedom Fund, a non-profit organization, received $35 million in donations after Floyd's murder that was intended to help protesters post bail who were jailed during the riots. Public figures and celebrities such as Kamala Harris, Steve Carell, Cynthia Nixon, and Seth Rogen were among those praising the organization's mission on social media. The organization later drew criticism for bailing people out of jail at random, including those charged with violent crimes and sex offenses unrelated to the protests. Only about a dozen protesters who were arrested during the late May and early June 2020 events had their bail posted by the Minnesota Freedom Fund.

==== Looting, burglary, and vandalism ====
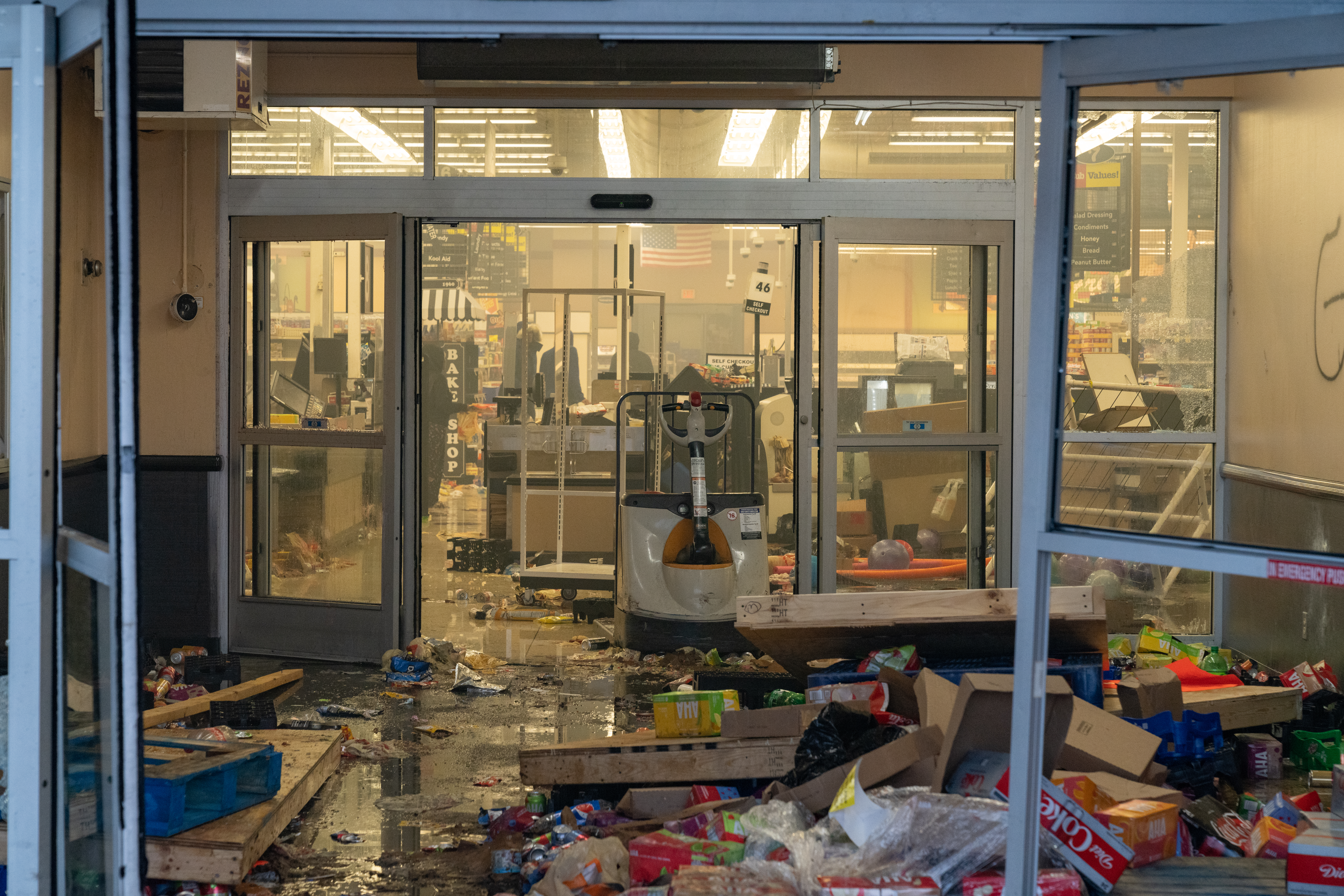
Aftermath of a looted Cub Foods store in Minneapolis, May 30, 2020.

Police departments and local newspapers documented widespread property damage during the unrest, with some residents submitting videos and photographic evidence. Investigators of property damage only prioritized the most serious cases after reviewing available footage. Ninety-one people faced Minnesota state felony charges by December 2020 for burglary connected to looting in late May—35 in Hennepin County and 56 in Ramsey County. All but three of those charged were from Minnesota and most had home addresses in Minneapolis or Saint Paul. Nearly a third of all charges resulted in the cases beyond resolved through diversion or restorative justice programs. The number of felony charges were represented a small fraction of the total people culpable for rioting and looting during the events in late May and early June 2020. Though nearly 1,500 property locations were damaged in May 2020, criminal charges by a year later had only been filed for damage related to 11 properties.

==== Police assault of Jaleel Stallings ====
Jaleel Stallings, a 27-year-old man from Saint Paul, faced intentional murder and several other criminal charges for firing three gunshots at a vehicle containing Minneapolis police officers shortly before 11:00 p.m. on May 30, 2020. The police officers were patrolling the area of East Lake Street between and 15th Avenue that had been the location of extensive property damage during the unrest and was under a curfew order. The officers encountered a group of people in a parking lot. Most of the group members scattered. Officers, according to their statements in court documents, believed Stallings crouching down to pick up a rock and fired a less-lethal round at him. Police officers said Stalling returned gunshots at the officers before fleeing and that they chased him down and detained him after a struggle. The officers recovered a pistol nearby allegedly used by Stallings, and that was legally possessed by him. In early June 2020, Hennepin County officials charged Stallings with attempted second-degree murder and for assault and rioting. The Minnesota Freedom Fund posted the $75,000 bail to get the man out of jail while he awaited trial.

A five-day jury trial presided over by Judge Tamara Garcia took place in a Hennepin County court in July 2021 that acquitted Stallings of all charges, after he successfully argued his actions were self defense. During the trial, his testimony and police body camera footage revealed that an unmarked, white van containing several police officers approached the crowd gathered outside a gas station that fired rubber bullets before identifying itself as police. The crowd included a local business owner and neighbors who were protecting the commercial buildings from potential looters. Stallings, who was struck in the chest by a less-lethal munition, testified that at the time he thought he was under attack by unknown people, who might be white supremacists, who were firing actual bullets. In response, he fired three defensive shots low and toward the white van without striking the vehicle or any person. When a SWAT team exited the unmarked van, he dropped the gun and immediately laid on the ground to surrender, and was then beaten by the officers as they arrested him, resulting in a fractured eye socket.

Initial police statements about the incident and the police body camera footage shown at trial had contrasting details about what actually happened, and the body camera footage helped exonerate Stallings. After the conclusion of the attempted murder trial, Stallings filed a police misconduct civil lawsuit that the City of Minneapolis settled for $1.5 million in 2022. A fiend of Stalling was also repeatedly Tased during the incident and later settled a $645,000 lawsuit with the City of Minneapolis. The City of Minneapolis settled a $2 million lawsuit in 2026 for six other people who had gathered outside the gas station to protect it from looters that night Stallings was assaulted.

Hennepin County Attorney Michael O. Freeman, the official who filed the criminal charges against Stalling and unsuccessfully prosecuted him, later said that police officers misled him about the May 30, 2020, incident, though Freeman's office had access to the same body camera footage that showed excessive use of force. Freeman referred the officer misconduct investigation to the Attorney General of Minnesota for further action. In late 2022, former Minneapolis police officer Justin Stetson was charged by a field office of the Attorney General of Minnesota with third-degree assault related to the May 31, 2020, incident for allegedly hitting and kicking Stallings in the head and face several times after he was unarmed, had surrendered, and was lying on the ground, and for striking Stallings again after he was restrained by handcuffs. On May 8, 2023, prosecutors offered Stetson a plea deal allowing him to plead guilty to a misdemeanor and avoid jail time, which Stallings objected to. Nonetheless, a judge accepted the plea agreement at a court hearing on May 10, 2023. Stenson pleaded guilty to third-degree assault and one count of misconduct as a public officer, with the condition he never work as a police officer in Minnesota again. Stenson had already taken a disability retirement in August 2022 and the plea did not affect his state pension. He was sentenced in late 2023 to 15 days in a county workhouse and two years of probation. In light of the plea deal, the U.S. Attorney's office declined to pursue federal civil rights charges. Stenson was ultimately fired from the police force for misconduct.

==== Tanker truck incident on I-35W ====
A 35-year-old man from Otsego, Minnesota, was charged with criminal vehicle operation for the incident on May 31, 2021, when he drove his semi-truck onto Interstate 35W in Minneapolis as a crowd of thousands of people were marching down the south-bound lanes. Minnesota Public Safety Commissioner John Harrington initially denied that the truck driver did the act intentionally and released him pending further investigation, but he was later charged in October 2020 in connection with the incident. In their criminal complaint, the police believed the driver should have been able to see the crowd and multiple vehicles that had either stopped or were traveling in the wrong direction, giving him time to stop or change course, and that he drove in a manner to scare protesters marching on the bridge. In June 2021, Hennepin County prosecutors dropped the charge for criminal vehicle operations and the driver agreed to a year-long probationary period and payment of restitution. Authorities did not charge anyone for allegedly attacking the driver during the May 31 incident.

=== Federal ===
Federal authorities investigated 164 arson cases related to fires that occurred in the Minneapolis–Saint Paul region during the May 2020 riots. Authorities relied largely on video evidence and in some cases on the social media videos that suspects posted of themselves at protests. Twenty-two people had been charged in federal court by February 2021 in connection to the local unrest that occurred in May 2020. Seventeen of the federal charges were for arson-related crimes, but arson charges against two persons were later dropped. Thirteen people had pled guilty to federal arson charges by January 2022.

Only one person who was charged federally had a residential address in Minneapolis, while two were from outside of Minnesota, including an Iowa man charged with illegal gun procession who was arrested during the unrest and an Illinois man who later pled guilty to arson charges. Over half of those charged were described as being white Americans who had varying or unclear ideologies for their actions. The average age of those charged was 25. Many came to Minneapolis and Saint Paul from suburban communities or exurbs of the Twin Cities during the unrest with intent to cause damage.

==== Minneapolis police station arson ====
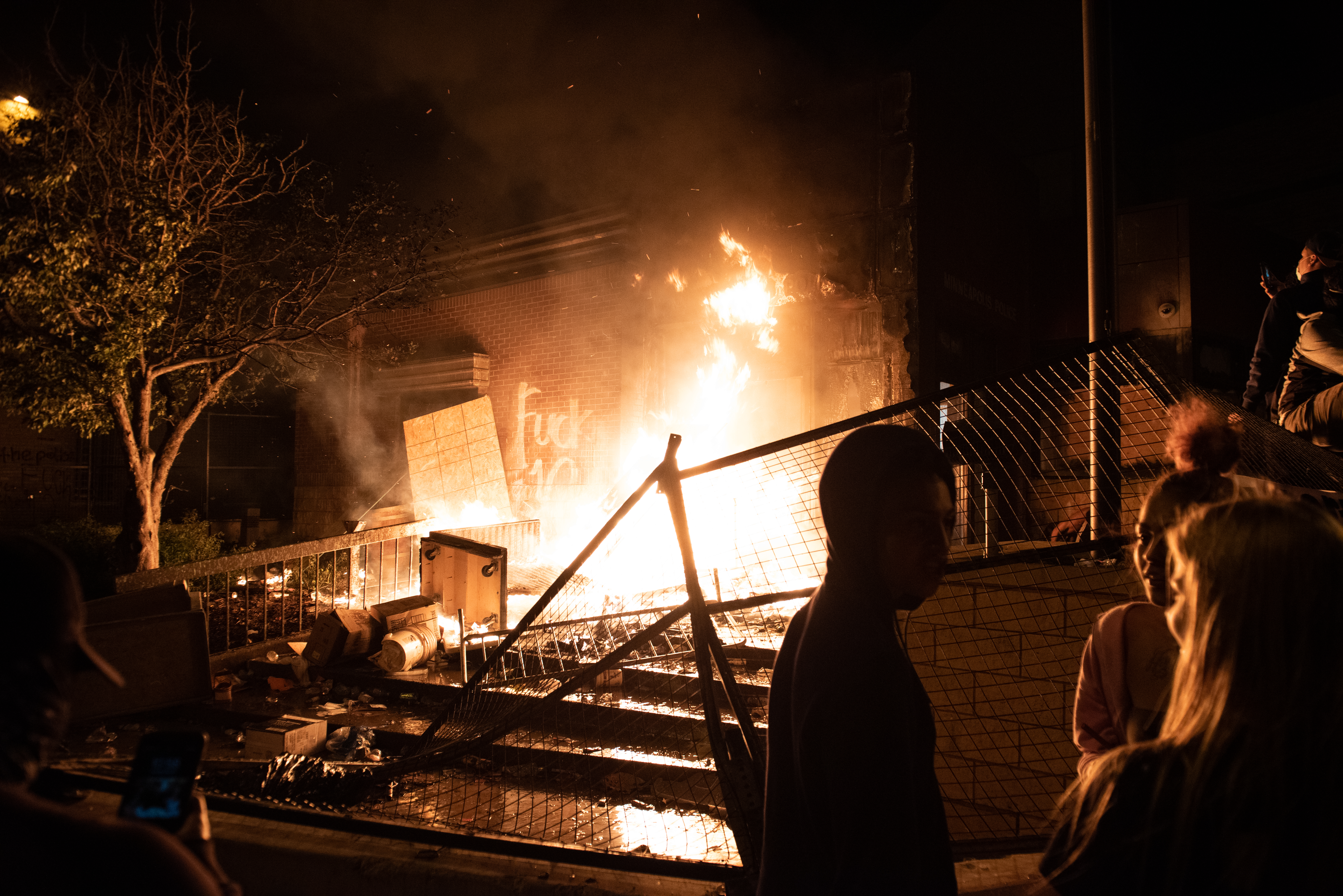
Third precinct police station ablaze in Minneapolis, May 28, 2020.

Four men pled guilty to federal charges in United States district court for their role in destroying the third precinct police station in Minneapolis on May 28, 2020, that was overrun by demonstrators and set on fire after police abandoned the building. However, as many as 1,000 people had gathered outside the police building that night and many entered the building illegally. The four men, who all pled guilty to the charge of conspiracy to commit arson, were the 24-year old Davon De-Andre Turner of Saint Paul, the 23-year old Branden Michael Wolfe of both Saint Paul and the U.S. state of Florida, the 26-year old Bryce Williams from Staples, and the 22-year old Dylan Robinson from Brainerd.

The four men arrived separately at the police station the night of May 28 where a large crowd gathered late that night. When the crowd eventually began chanting, "Burn it down, burn it down", the four men allegedly breached fencing around the police station intended to keep trespassers out and participating in acts that set the building on fire. Robinson allegedly climbed over fencing around the police station and lit a Molotov cocktail that another person threw at the building. Robinson was sentenced to four years in prison.

Williams was a self-described semiprofessional basketball player, social media influencer, and aspiring documentary film maker. Authorities used videos he had posted of himself on the social media website TikTok, as well as surveillance footage of the property, to connect him to the destruction of the third precinct in Minneapolis. Court documents alleged that Williams worked with Turner to light an incendiary device and helped accelerate the fire. Turner was sentenced to three years in prison and ordered to pay $12 million in restitution. Williams was sentenced to 27 months in prison, a length of time shorter than the other three men who had pled guilty to the crime.

While other people started the initial fire, authorities alleged that Wolf accelerated it by pushing material into it and that he later entered the building. Days afterwards, authorities found Wolf in possession of weapons and riot gear he allegedly stole from the building the night of May 28. Wolf received a three-and-a-half-year prison sentence for the arson charge. Wolf knew George Floyd casually from the Salvation Army Harbor Light Center homeless shelter where Floyd was once a security guard and Wolf had received free meals. In a media interview after his guilty plea, Wolfe denied being a part of any extremist organization or being influenced by a radical ideology and said that his bipolar disorder put him in a manic state during the unrest.

A judge ordered Robinson, Turner, Williams, and Wolf to pay $12 million in restitution for conspiring to commit arson at the police station. The amount was calculated based on the cost of rebuilding the station, replacing equipment, and paying overtime for city employees affected by the police station arson.

==== Other acts of arson in Minneapolis ====
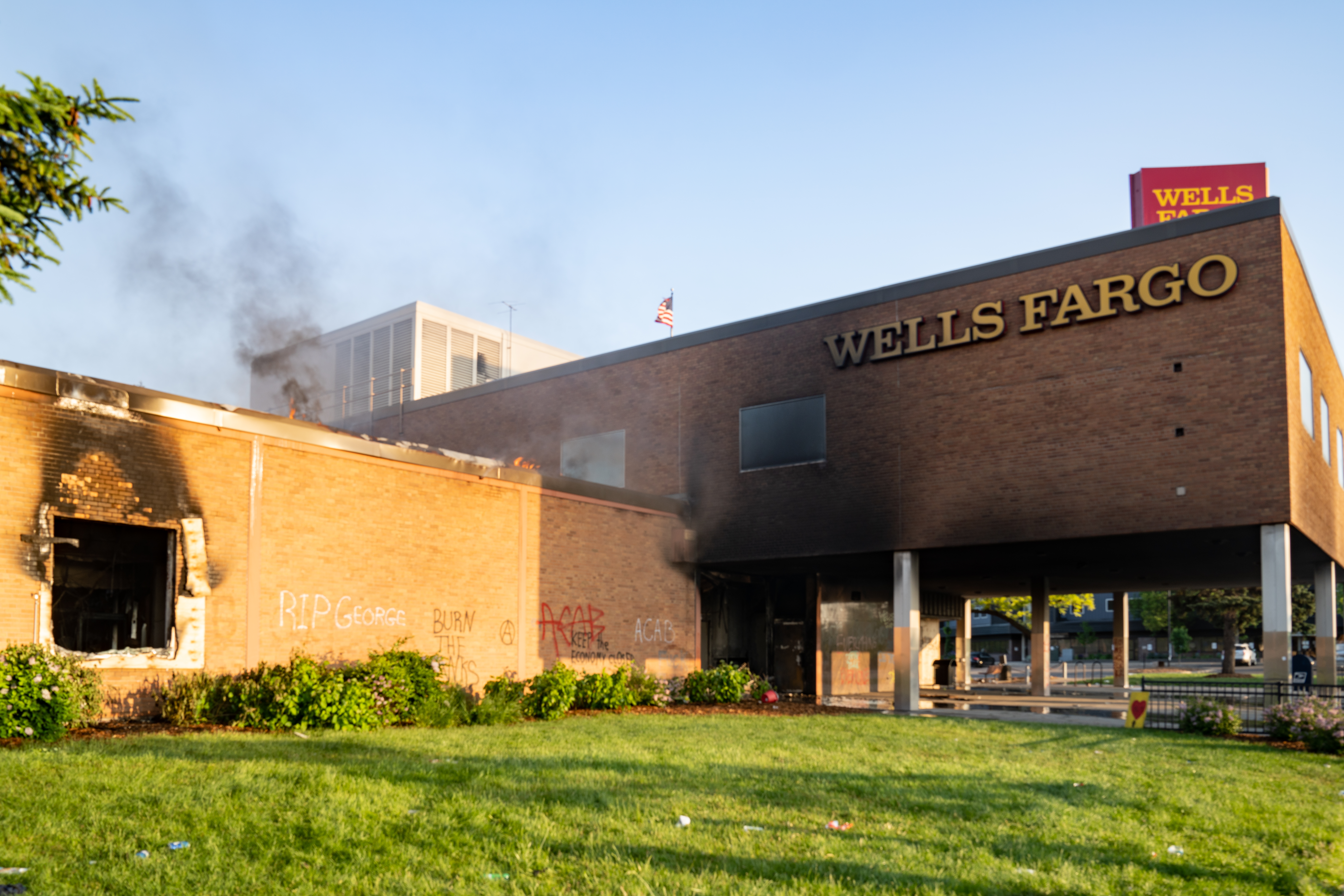
A smoldering Wells Fargo bank building on Nicollet Avenue in Minneapolis, May 29, 2020.

As unrest grew in Minneapolis, Matthew Lee Rupert, a 28-year old from Galesburg, Illinois, posted messages on social media on May 28, 2020, that he was going to Minneapolis "to riot". He recruited a 17-year old companion to join him on the trip. Rupert then livestreamed his actions in Minneapolis on social media, which included inciting violence against law enforcement officers and breaking into a boarded-up Sprint cellphone store on Nicollet Avenue on May 29, 2020, and lighting the building on fire. Rupert plead guilty on April 7, 2021, in U.S. District Court to one federal count of arson, in exchange for the federal investigators dropping civil disorder and riot charges against him. Rupert was sentenced on August 10, 2021, to an 8.5-year prison sentence and three years of supervised release.

Two suburban Twin Cities men—the 29-year-old Marc Bell Gonzales from Wayzata and the 24-year-old Alexander Steven Heil from Monticello—faced federal charges for conspiring to commit arson at a Wells Fargo Bank building on Nicollet Avenue in Minneapolis that was set ablaze by several people on May 28, 2020, and suffered heavy fire damage. Gonzales poured gasoline on a fire as a crowd chanted, "burn it down", during a period widespread civil disorder; he was sentenced to 37 months in prison. Heil admitted to throwing items into the fire so the bank building would burn faster; he was sentenced to two years in prison.

Montez Terriel Lee Jr. of Rochester, Minnesota, pled guilty to an arson charge for the fire at the Max It Pawn store on East Lake Street on May 28, 2020. Surveillance video that night captured him pouring an accelerate around the shop and lighting it on fire. In early 2022, he was sentenced to 10 years in prison.

==== Acts of arson in Saint Paul ====
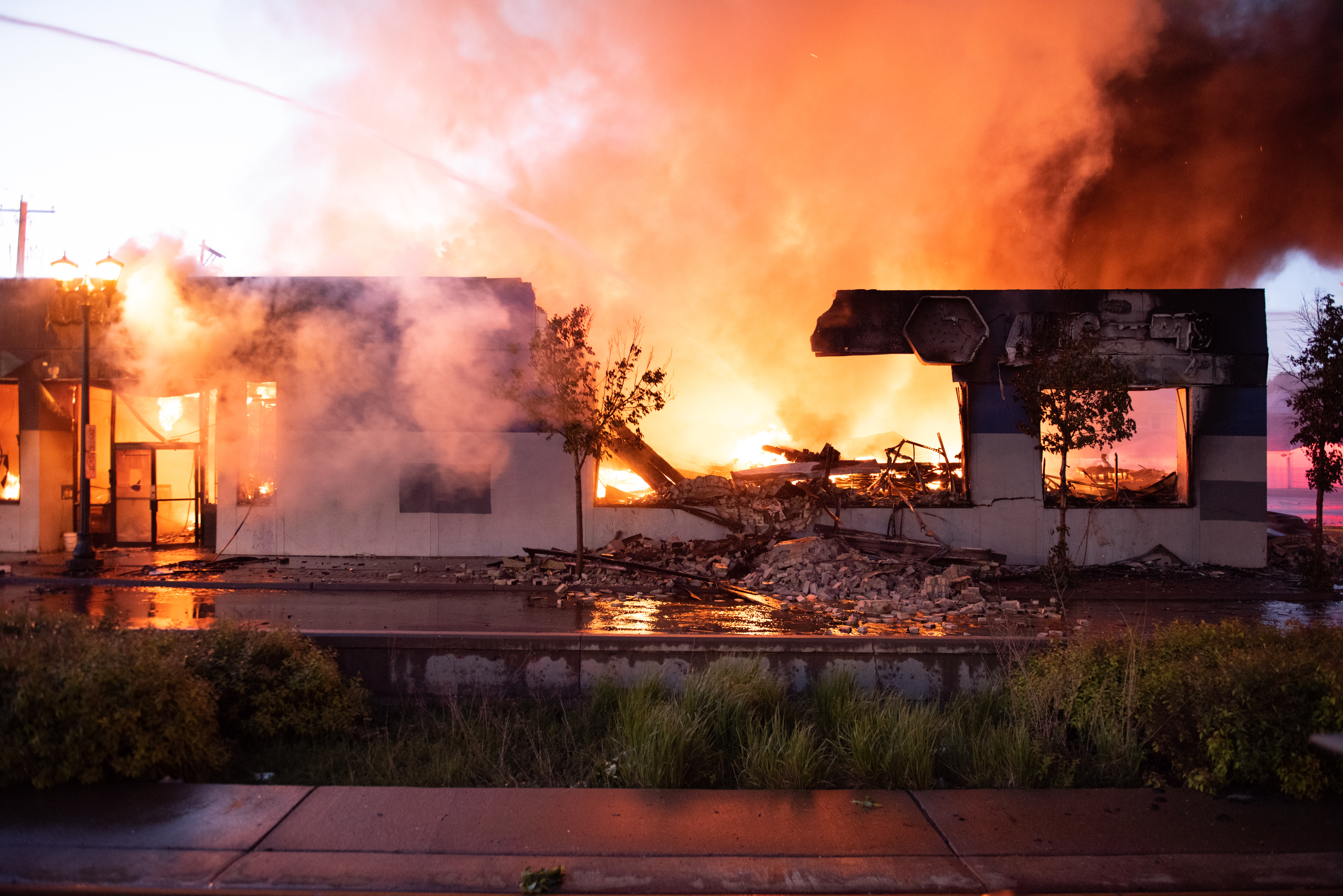
Fires burn at a Napa Auto Parts store on University Avenue in Saint Paul, May 28, 2020.

Jose A. Felan Jr. and Mena Dyaha Yousif, residents of Rochester, Minnesota, were arrested by U.S. Marshals for their alleged role in setting several fires to business along University Avenue in Saint Paul on May 28, 2020. According to federal charging documents, Felan was seen on video recordings entering and exiting a Napa Auto Parts store multiple times as it was on fire. Surveillance footage captured Felan in possession of fuel canisters as he entered a Goodwill thrift store and Gordon Parks High School. Federal authorities alleged he had a role in setting fire to the thrift store and high school, and to the nearby 7 Mile Sportswear clothing store. Yousif was accused of aiding and abetting Felan and later helping him evade authorities. In the days after their alleged actions in Saint Paul during the riots, Felan and Yousif fled to Mexico to evade arrest, but the U.S. Marshals located them, and Mexican authorities helped return them to the United States in February 2021 to face federal arson charges. Felan and Yousif initially entered a plea of not guilty to the charges against them during judicial proceedings in early 2021. Yousif, however, later pled guilty on September 2, 2021, to the charge of being an accessary after the fact to arson. In February 2022, Felan pled guilty to arson charges for the fires set at Goodwill, Gordon Parks High School, and 7 Mile Sportswear on May 28, 2020. A federal judge on October 18, 2022, sentenced him to 6.5 years in prison and ordered him to pay $39,000 in restitution. Yousef was sentenced to three years of probation at a court hearing on January 3, 2023.

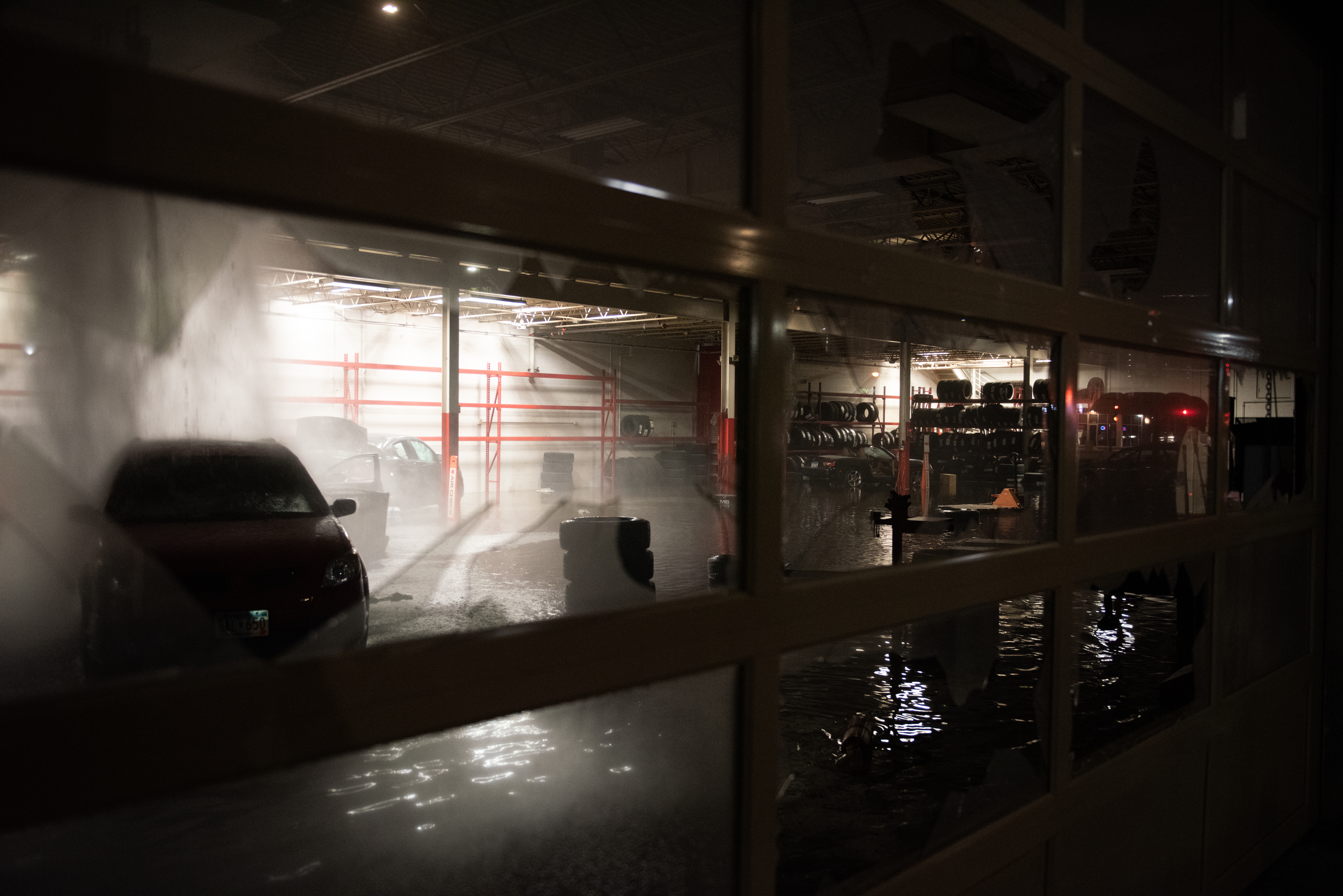
Fire sprinkling system activated at the Discount Tire store on University Avenue on May 28, 2020, after it had been set on fire.

At Gordon Parks High School on May 28, 2020, Felan was allegedly aided in lighting fires by Mohamed Hussein Abdi of Maplewood, Minnesota. Abdi plead guilty in March 2021 to one federal count of conspiracy to commit arson. Surveillance video from May 28 had captured Abdi inside the school where he lit a trash can on fire with a liquid accelerant. After setting fires at the school, federal authorities alleged that Abdi then set fires at the nearby Discount Tire store on University Avenue. In February 2022, Abdi was sentenced to five years of probation and ordered to pay $34,000 in restoration for the damage he caused during the riots.

Minnesota residents McKenzy Ann DeGidio Dunn of Rosemount and Samuel Elliott Frey of Brooklyn Park travelled together to Saint Paul on May 28, 2020, to participate in the unrest. According to federal charges, they were part of a crowd that broke into the Great Health and Nutrition store on University Avenue and helped set the building on fire. Dunn and Frey both pled guilty to arson conspiracy charges. Dunn was sentenced to 180 days of home confinement and three-years probation and ordered to pay $31,000 in restitution. Frey admitted to pouring out accelerant and lighting a fire at the store. He was sentenced to 27 months in prison and ordered to pay $33,827 in restitution.

Matthew Scott White, a 31-year-old man from Saint Paul, Minnesota, was sentenced to 72 months in prison for starting a fire at an Enterprise Rent-A-Car building that was entirely destroyed by fire on May 28, 2020. White had pled guilty to committing acts of arson at the building, which was located on University Avenue in Saint Paul.

==== Acts of arson in Apple Valley ====
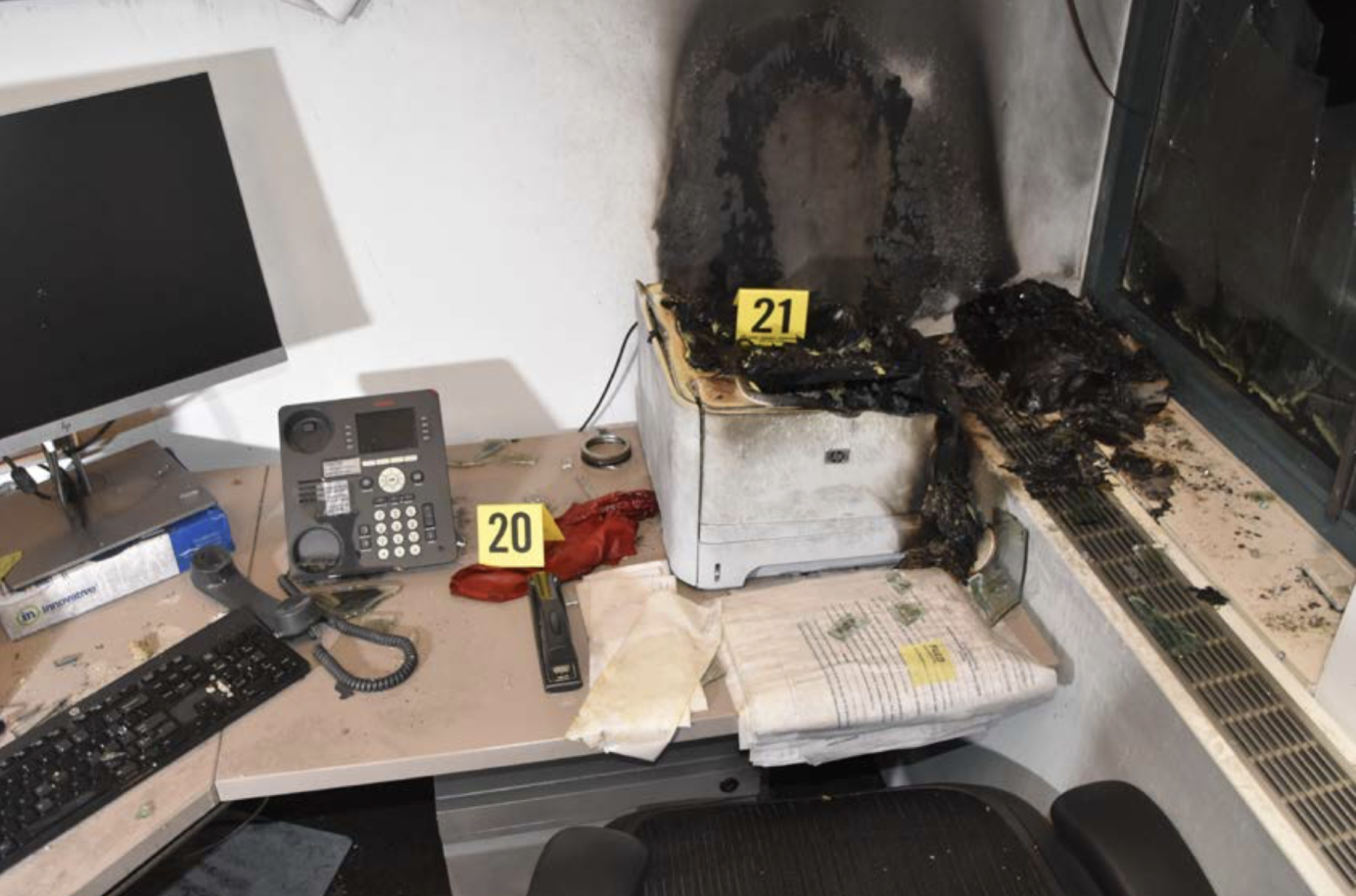
FBI photo of the Dakota County Western Government Center, May 29, 2020.

Federal authorities charged two men for firebombing the Dakota County Western Service Center in Apple Valley on May 29, 2020, during the unrest. Fornandous Cortez Henderson, a 32-year old from Savage, Minnesota, pled guilty to aiding and abetting arson. He admitted in court that he chose the facility as he had made court appearances there and because he was angry over the murder of Floyd. Henderson was sentenced to no more than six years in prison. The other co-defendant, Garret Patrick Ziegler, then 24-years old, from Long Lake, Minnesota, pled guilty to one count of adding and abetting arson. He was sentenced to five years in prison and three years of supervised released. The two men were ordered to each pay $206,000 in restitution.

== Deaths ==
=== Calvin Horton Jr. ===
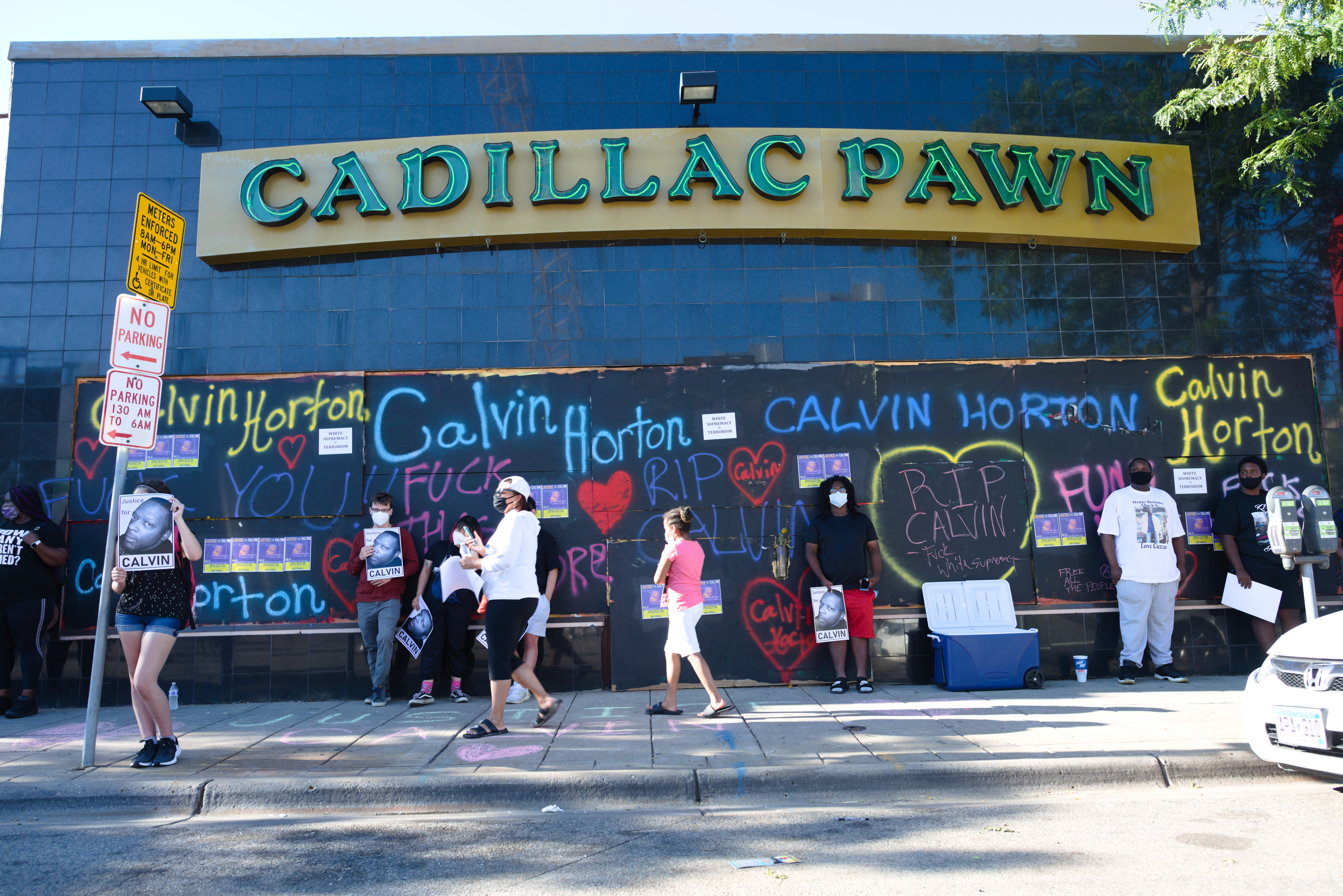
Protesters at the boarded-up Cadillac Pawn shop in Minneapolis, July 21, 2020.

Calvin Horton Jr., a 43-year-old man from Minneapolis, was fatally shot on May 27, 2020, by the owner of the Cadillac Pawn & Jewelry shop who believed he was burglarizing his business. The incident took place on East Lake Street about one mile (1.6 km) from the main protest site that evening. The owner of the shop was a 59-year-old man from Galesville, Wisconsin. The scene in and around the store was described as chaotic with many people inside the store. When police officers arrived in response to the shooting, bystanders threw objects at the officers as they administered aid to Horton Jr. and attempted to investigate the scene, leading the officers to abort the investigation. Paramedics that arrived were unable to reach Horton on the sidewalk due to the chaos until officers moved him to a nearby business. Horton died that night at a hospital.

The shop owner was arrested the night of the shooting and held in Hennepin County Jail for several days, but he was released pending further investigation. One witness said Horton was within seven feet (2.1 m) of the shop owner when he was shot. The Hennepin County Medical Examiner found Horton was turned sideways. Several other witnesses who were at the scene refused to cooperate with investigators, including a friend of Horton's and the pawn shop owner. Authorities were unable to recover the firearm used in the shooting or surveillance footage as the store was ransacked the night of the shooting and everything was taken when by the time officers returned to investigate the next day.

There were no new developments in the case by July 21, 2020, when family and supporters of Horton Jr. protested outside the store and demanded the owner be charged with murder. In December 2020, Hennepin County Attorney Mike Freeman's office declined to file charges against the pawn shop owner after a six-month investigation due to a lack of evidence to prove the shooting was not self-defense.

=== Oscar Lee Stewart Jr. ===
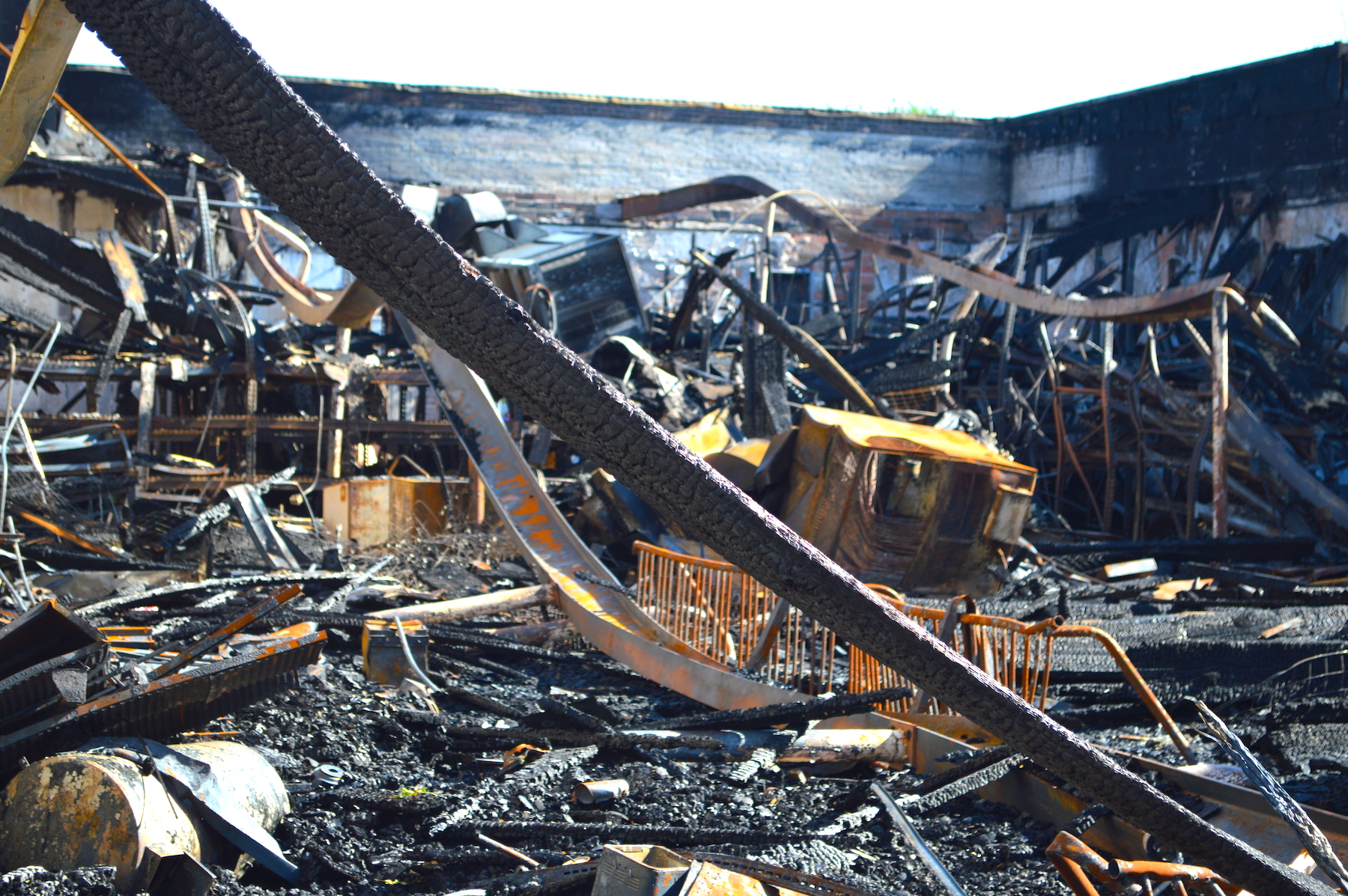
Wreckage of the Max It Pawn shop on East Lake Street in Minneapolis, June 2020.

Oscar Lee Stewart Jr., a 30-year-old man from Burnsville, Minnesota, died on May 28, 2020, in a fire that destroyed the Max It Pawn shop on East Lake Street in Minneapolis. His remains were recovered by federal and state authorities on July 20 and his identity revealed the following October. The Hennepin County Medical Examiner's office classified his death as a homicide due to inhalation and thermal injuries sustained in an intentional building fire. The Max It Pawn shop was located a few blocks east of the third precinct station in an area of heavy rioting. Montez T. Lee Jr., 25-year-old man from Rochester, Minnesota, was federally charged in June 2020 with arson for the particular fire.

Two days after Floyd's murder, on May 28, 2020, Stewart Jr. had called his family to say was going to stop by Lake Street to see the protests. He did not return home that evening. Over the ensuing weeks, his family filed a missing persons report and conducted a search of its own for Stewart, and eventually tracked his car's GPS to behind the pawnshop. It was not until authorities discovered human remains at the pawn shop in July, and later matched his DNA, that Stewart's whereabouts were known. Videos from the night of May 28, 2020, revealed a frantic search for a person trapped inside the pawn shop as it burned. Bystanders had tried to remove plywood panels from the exterior of the building when they heard faint cries for help from inside. The cries had stopped when firefighters arrived at the scene and found the building engulfed in flames. Firefighters were unable to conduct a sweep due to the deteriorating conditions. Family members of Stewart questioned why it took authorities nearly two months to search the wreckage again to find his remains.

In July 2021, Montez T. Lee Jr. pled guilty to one federal count of arson for his actions on May 28, 2020, that included pouring an accelerate around the business and setting it on fire. Lee, along with others, broke into the pawn shop, and Lee's actions were captured by surveillance video. Lee was not specifically prosecuted for Steward's death and his attorney disputed that he was responsible stating that Lee believed that the pawn shop was empty when he set it on fire. Prosecutors in the federal arson case against Lee requested leniency in his prison sentence as they did not believe he intended to hurt anyone when he started the fire. In January 2022, Montez Terrial Lee Jr. was sentenced to 10 years in prison.

== Agitators and extremist involvement ==
=== Official speculation ===
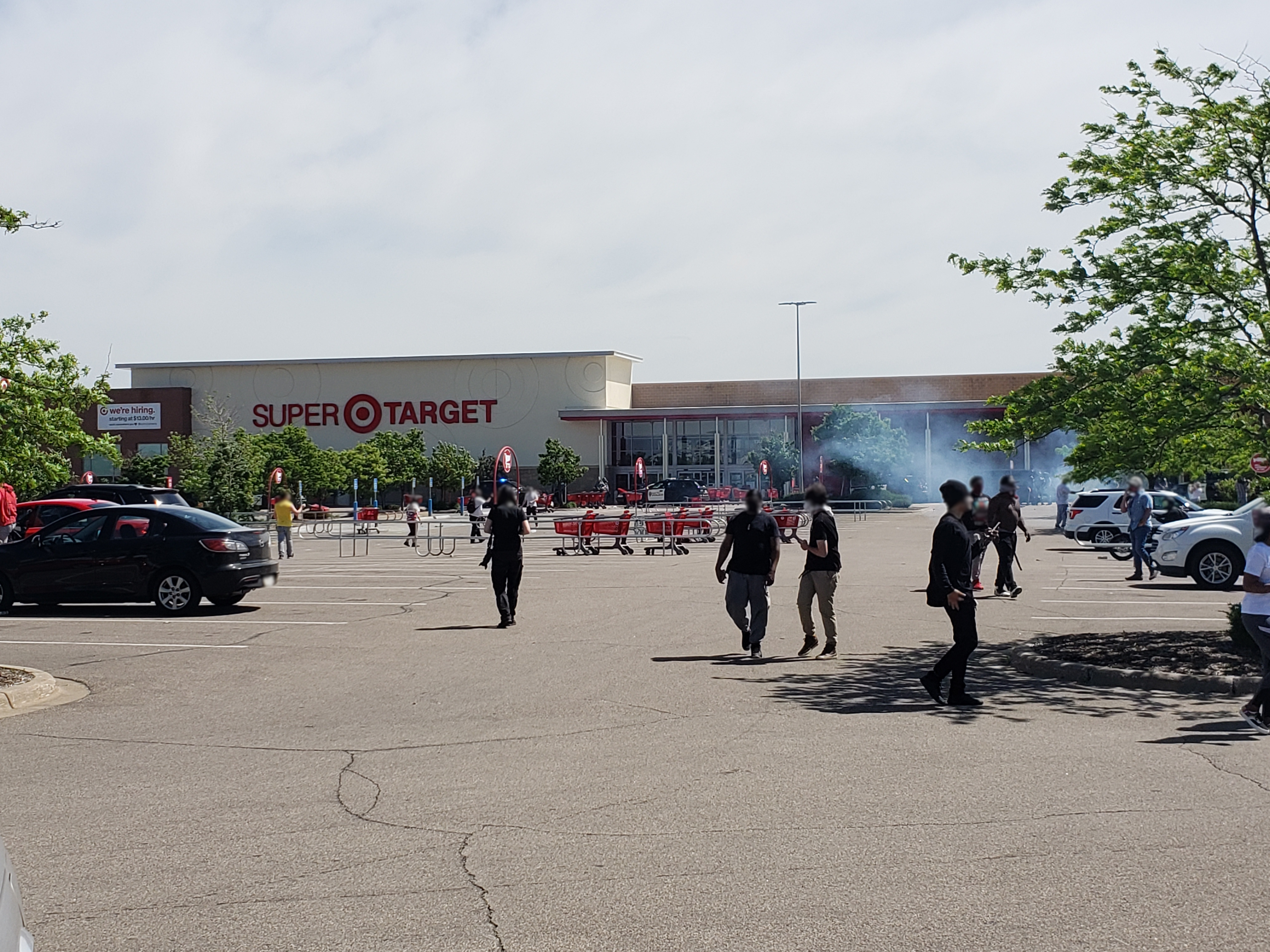
Tear gas disperses a crowd outside a Target store in Saint Paul, May 28, 2020.

Early in the events, state and local officials claimed that "white supremacists" and "outside agitators" might be responsible for property destruction and violence. Walz initially speculated that as much as 80% of people causing destruction and lighting fires could be from outside the state; several analyses of arrest records later contradicted the statement, finding that under 20% of those arrested were from outside Minnesota. Mayor Melvin Carter said that all of the people arrested in Saint Paul by May 30 were from outside Minnesota, a claim he later rescinded. President Donald Trump and U.S. Attorney General William Barr placed blame for the riots on radical leftists and the antifa movement, but an investigation by the FBI later revealed no such trend among those found responsible for the violence and destruction.

Hacked police intelligence documents as part of the BlueLeaks data release revealed that federal and state officials were monitoring social media and online message groups for extremist activity related to the protests. Local law enforcement were on high alert for suspicious behavior and attacks on officers, possibly leading to confrontational tactics with demonstrators, such as firing less-lethal munitions and tear gas. A number of imminent attack warnings officials were secretly monitoring never came to pass. Federal, state, and local officials refused to comment on the documents, saying they were obtained illegally and contained law enforcement-sensitive information.

The FBI believed that much of the damage in Minneapolis and Saint Paul was caused by unaffiliated, opportunistic crowds that amassed spontaneously, rather than by extremist actors. However, some white supremacist groups discussed exploiting the events to incite racial violence, and federal officials later prosecuted several Boogaloo movement members for crimes committed during or after the riots in Minneapolis.

=== "Umbrella Man" ===
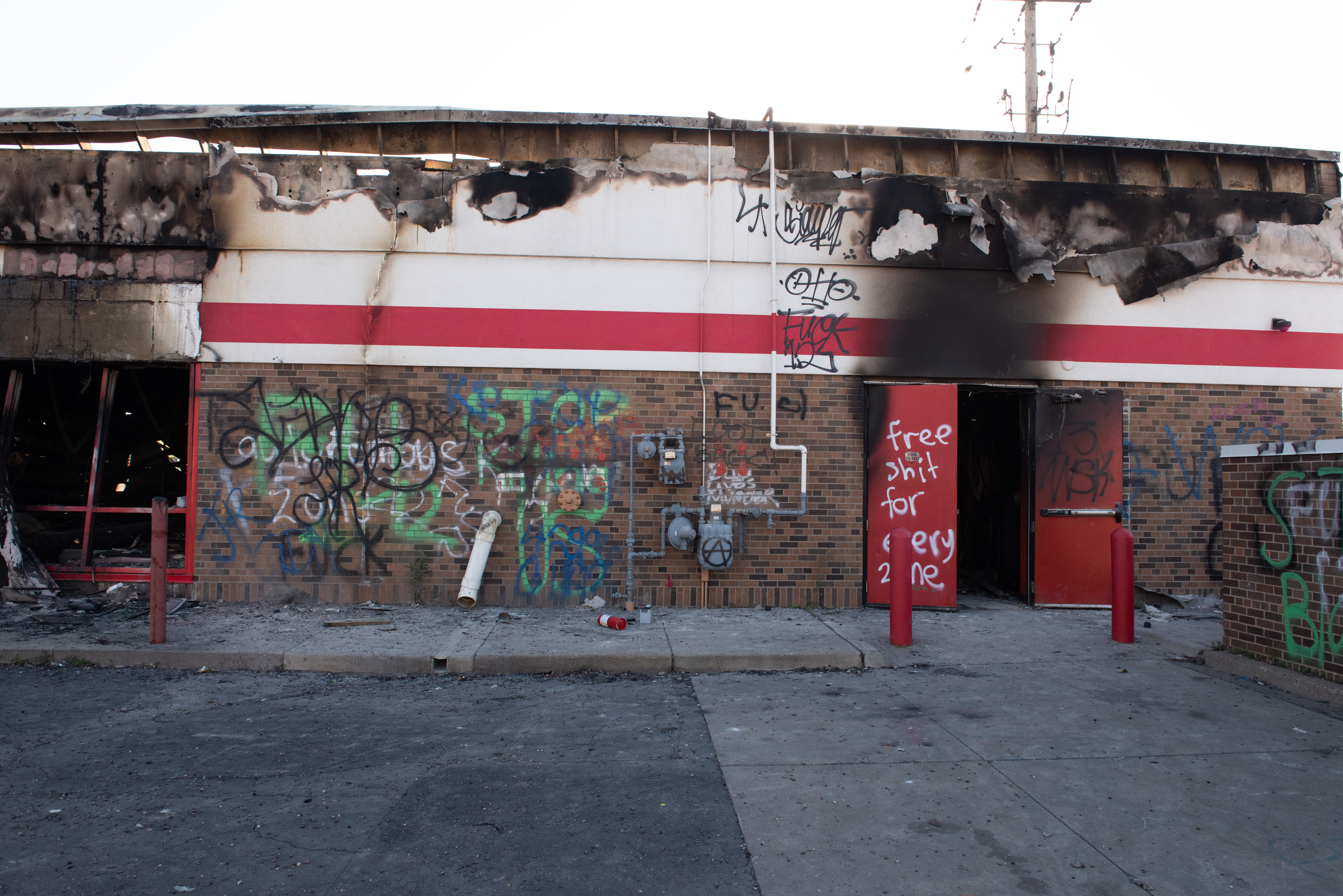
Wreckage of an AutoZone store in Minneapolis, May 28, 2020.

A person, nicknamed "Umbrella Man", who dressed in black clothing, wore a gas mask, and carried an umbrella and small sledgehammer, was seen in local livestreamer Brad Svenson's video taken on May 27, 2020, breaking windows at an AutoZone store near the third police precinct, as well as spray-painting "free shit for everyone zone" on the store. He also made violent threats to a photojournalist who captured images of him in the background of a news report. Later that day, the AutoZone store was set on fire by unknown people—the first of many acts of arson that occurred over the next three days.

Videos of "Umbrella Man" smashing the AutoZone windows circulated widely on social media in the latter days of the riots. Internet sleuths circulated false rumors that the man was a Saint Paul police officer. In response, the city's police department released video evidence of the police officer on duty that day to exonerate him. In late July 2020 the Minneapolis police department identified a 34-year-old man from Ramsey, Minnesota, as the suspect for "Umbrella Man"—he had ties to the Hells Angels and Aryan Cowboy Brotherhood (a neo-Nazi prison gang and organized crime gang), and he participated in the harassment of a Muslim woman in Stillwater, Minnesota, in June 2020 that received media coverage. Police documents that were leaked to the public stated that white supremacist groups, including the Hells Angels and Aryan Cowboys, had discussed discrediting protests by posing as demonstrators. Minneapolis police obtained a cellphone search warrant on June 27, 2020, to examine geolocation data. The search warrant said that the protests had been "relatively peaceful" until the person referred to as "Umbrella Man" began damaging the AutoZone store, setting off a destructive chain of events. By mid 2021, the Minneapolis police refused to comment on "Umbrella Man" or new developments as they considered the matter to be an open investigation.

The 34-year-old man had not been charged with any crime by late 2022. In October of that year, the FBI released new images of "Umbrella Man" and asked for the public's help in identifying a White male who carried a backpack and an opened umbrella as he damaged the AutoZone store. It was unclear if the FBI was seeking identification of the former suspect or of a different person.

=== Boogaloo movement ===
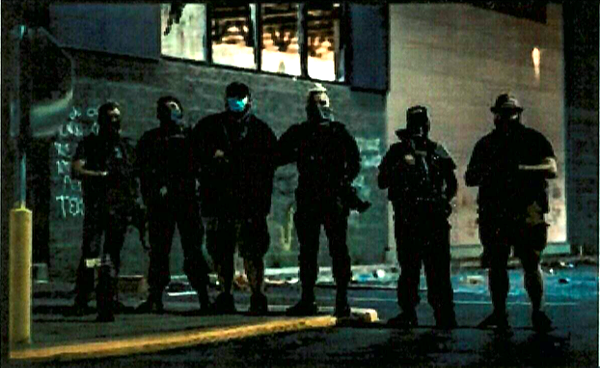
FBI photo of Boogaloo movement adherents in Minneapolis, May 28, 2020.

During the days of initial unrest that followed Floyd's murder on May 25, 2020, adherents of the Boogaloo movement, a loosely organized far-right antigovernmental extremist ideology, discussed how to further chaos leading to a civil war that it hoped would be blamed on the Black Lives Matter movement. Three Boogaloo movement members were later convicted of federal crimes related to violent participation in the unrest with intention to cause destruction in Minneapolis. Facing charges were the 30-year-old Michael Robert Solomon of New Brighton, Minnesota, the 22-year-old Benjamin Ryan Teeter of Hampstead, North Carolina, and the 26-year-old Ivan Harrison Hunter of Boerne, Texas. According to federal prosecutors, Solomon recruited Boogaloo movement participation in the unrest via Facebook. Teeter was one of at least five Boogaloo adherents to travel to Minneapolis to join Solomon. Boogaloo movement adherents were seen openly carrying firearms in Minneapolis neighborhoods and discussed committing acts of violence against police and other targets to advance their mission to overthrow the government.

After the riots abated, Boogaloo adherents attempted to raise money to buy a training facility in South America. Solomon and Teeter connected with an FBI informant who had posed as a member of the Hamas organization, who they agreed to supply weapons to, and they also made plans to bomb a courthouse in the Twin Cities metropolitan area. Solomon and Teeter were arrested by federal agents in September 2020 before their plans were carried out. The two pled guilty to federal terrorism charges, Teeter in December 2020 and Solomon in May 2021. After providing information to assist other government cases, Solomon was sentenced in March 2022 to three in years in prison and five years of supervised release. Teeter was sentenced in June 2022 to four years in prison.

Federal authorities charged Ivan Harrison Hunter, a 26-year-old man from Boerne, Texas, with one count of interstate travel to incite a riot for shooting 13 rounds from an AK-47-style machine gun into the Minneapolis third police precinct building while people were inside, looting it, and helping to set it on fire the night of May 28. Court documents alleged that he was acting as an agent provocateur and that he travelled from Texas to Minneapolis with the intent to cause damage. Hunter had made plans with other Boogaloo movement adherents, including Benjamin Teeter, to meet at the Cub Foods store near the third precinct police station the night of May 28, and he bragged about his role in setting the police station on fire afterward via posts on Facebook and in text messages with Steven Carrillo, a suspect in the Boogaloo ambush attacks of security personnel and law enforcement officers in California in May and June 2020. Hunter described himself as a "terrorist" and said he was a leader of a local Boogaloo group in Texas. He initially entered a plea of not guilty to federal riot charges at a May 2021 judicial preceding, but he later pled guilty in September 2021. In April 2022, Hunter was sentenced to four years in prison.

=== Hackers and cyberattacks ===
The City of Minneapolis experienced an increase in cyberattacks, led by hacktivist groups, in the immediate aftermath of Floyd's murder. Instances of ransomware, cryptomining, and malware increased. Malicious actors also caused temporary outages of Minnesota statewide emergency community systems by deploying denial of service attacks.

== Short-term impacts ==
=== Policing policies ===
A "defund police" sign and stage before a rally at Powderhorn Park in Minneapolis, June 7, 2020.

Though the Minneapolis police was under intense scrutiny in the aftermath of Floyd's murder, the city struggled with how to reform the force. In mid June, the Minneapolis City Council and the Minnesota Department of Human Rights agreed to a temporary restraining order requiring Minneapolis to update its procedures to ban chokeholds and other neck restraints by police, such as the one used in the murder George Floyd. Many organizations quickly distanced themselves from the Minneapolis police force by ending formal policing relationships, led by city's school district and park board (relationship restored in 2022) and the University of Minnesota. The park board also announced changes to the park police uniforms and vehicles to distinguish them from Minneapolis police. The Minnesota state legislature passed major police reform legislation in July that banned chokeholds, established an independent commission to review police-related deaths, and required de-escalation training for officers. By late 2020, city officials announced plans to begin pilot programs for mental health response teams, violence prevention, early warning system to flag officer behavior, broader use of 3-1-1 system for theft reports, and a truth and reconciliation commission to promote racial healing. The city and police department also revisited several policies, such as limiting no-knock warrants, clarifying use of force, requiring de-escalation attempts, and more heavily involving the city's attorney office in office misconduct investigations.

A public pledge to dismantle the police that was taken at Powderhorn Park on June 7, 2020, by nine Minneapolis city council members, though it represented a veto-proof majority, did not actually disband the city's police force and details about the next steps in the process were not defined at the time. Some activists wanted to consider the idea of unarmed crisis response personnel and re-purposing the police department's $193 million annual budget for education, food, housing, and health care. Public conversation about the future of the city's police department came as Minneapolis had tallied its highest levels of violent crime in decades. In December 2020, the Minneapolis city council voted to redirect $7.7 million of the department's proposed $179 million budget to mental health crisis teams, violence prevention programs, and for civilian employees to handle non-emergency theft and property damage reports. The council placed $11.4 million of the police budget in a reserve fund that requires ad hoc council approval for police recruitment and overtime. By a narrow 7–6 margin, the council voted to keep in place the police department target level of 888 officers by 2022. The 4.5 percent shift in the police budget was considered "not nearly the sweeping change that activists and some lawmakers had demanded" after Floyd's murder and the resulting unrest.

Bob Kroll, head of the Minneapolis police officers union, was the subject of several protests. After offering support for the officers at Floyd's murder and a full investigative process, he made few substantial statements during the initial course of events. But after several days of clashes with the police and protesters, he sent a controversial email to Minneapolis rank-and-file police officers. The message criticized Frey and Walz for not containing the riots and commending the work of responding officers, and he characterized the protests as a "terrorist movement", a claim he also made about the Black Lives Matter movement in 2016. Several local officials were quick to condemn Kroll's email statement, including city council president Lisa Bender who described Kroll as "a barrier to change" of the Minneapolis police force. Several labor union leaders called for Kroll's removal, with one saying he perpetuated "a culture of violence" against the black community. In June, Arradondo announced the police department would withdraw from union contract negotiations as a first step towards police reforms, but other city officials continued to participate in negotiations.

In November 2021 City Question 2, a ballot measure to amend the city's charter, was put before Minneapolis voters to replace the police department with a department of public safety. The establishment of a new department safety would have eliminated a required minimum number of police officers based on the city's population, and the wording of the ballot question said that it would provide a "comprehensive public health approach" that "could include" police officers "if necessary". In order to pass, the measure required support from 51% of voters. It was rejected with 80,506 or 56.2 percent of votes for "no" and 62,813 or 43.8% for "yes".

By the end of 2021, city officials had restored police funding in Minneapolis to $191 million—close to funding level prior to the resource diversion following the murder of George Floyd in 2020. The Minneapolis Park and Recreation Board and University of Minnesota restored their relationships with the Minneapolis Police Department in mid 2022.

=== Monuments removed and names changed ===
As the global protest movement over Floyd's murder turned towards removing monuments and memorials with controversial legacies, a statue of Christopher Columbus at the Minnesota State Capitol building in Saint Paul was torn down by American Indian Movement demonstrators on June 10, 2020, and the Minnesota Twins removed a statue of former club owner Calvin Griffith on June 19, 2020.

Residents of the Minneapolis neighborhood of East Calhoun scrutinized John C. Calhoun, the neighborhood's namesake, legacy of defending slavery, and pushed the city council to rename it East Bde Maka Ska in July 2021. In 2022, after a campaign by activists and residents, the City of Minneapolis changed the name of Dight Avenue that had recognized the controversial Charles Fremont Dight to Cheatham Avenue in recognition of John Cheatham, one of the first Black firefighters in the city. Minneapolis Public Schools scrutinized the naming of public schools after slave owners and military generals who committed genocide against Native Americans. Jefferson Global Studies & Humanities, named after Thomas Jefferson, was renamed Ella Baker Global Studies & Humanities. Sheridan Dual Language Elementary, named after Phillip Sheridan, was renamed Las Estrellas Dual Language Elementary. The board also approved a name-change for Patrick Henry High School; after a multi-year process, it was renamed to Camden High School.

=== Political viewpoints and elections ===
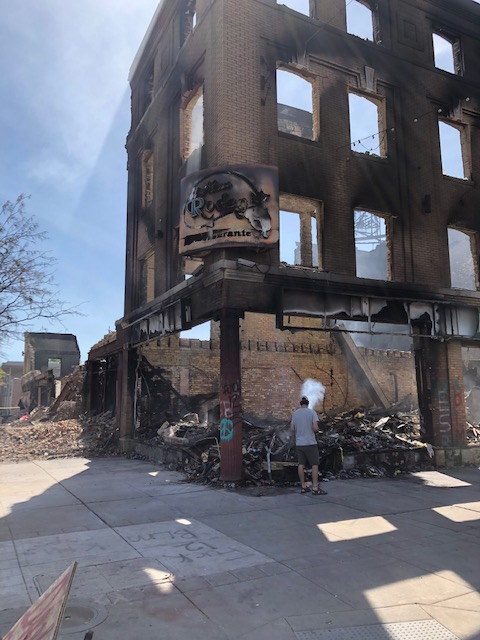
The destroyed El Nuevo Rodeo club building in Minneapolis, May 31, 2020.

As in many other locations in the United States, the majority of local protests in the aftermath of George Floyd's murder were characterized as peaceful events, and some protesters intervened to try and stop some of acts of destruction. However, for others, the damage from the initial wave of unrest was seen as an understandable reaction to years of racial injustice and lack of significant reform to law enforcement practices. The chaos and destruction in Minneapolis and Saint Paul became a subject of debate for politicians who attempted to assign blame to state and city officials for how they managed the crisis, while others pointed to historic factors of racial injustice that fueled public outrage. Even the terminology used to describe what happened in Minneapolis—"the riots" or "the uprising"—reflected growing political polarization in the United States at the time of Floyd's murder. Some commentators made comparisons of the May 2020 events in Minneapolis to the United States Capitol attack that occurred on January 6, 2021, but others disagreed and held that the causes of violent actions and the aims of people participating in the two events differed.

The civil rights movement sparked by Floyd's murder, as well as mitigation measures over the COVID-19 pandemic, led to a surge in voter registration in 2020. In Minnesota, registration for identified Democrats doubled, while identified Republican registration was flat compared to prior periods. Young people of color at suburban high schools felt the awareness after Floyd's murder allowed them to push for changes to address discrimination, racism, and the racial achievement gap in schools. Social justice organizations in Minnesota experienced a boost in revenue as a result of momentum behind the Black Lives Matter movement in the wake of Floyd's murder, with companies such as the Target Corporation and U.S. Bank making multi-million dollar donations to local nonprofits.

In the immediate aftermath of the unrest, there was speculation that it could have an effect on the outcome of statewide elections in Minnesota, possibly reversing narrow Democratic victories in recent contests. Imagery from fires that burned on Lake Street during the unrest in Minneapolis and the mantra "defund the police" were featured in disputed political advertisements for President Donald Trump’s re-election campaign as a reason to vote against his opponent Joe Biden, though the Biden campaign did not support defunding the police and condemned rioting actions. In the 2020 United States elections, Biden won Minnesota by a 7.12% margin, an improvement over Hillary Clinton's 1.52% margin in the state in 2016. Biden's biggest gains from the 2016 election in Minnesota were in the suburbs of Minneapolis–Saint Paul where some residents identified systematic racism as a major problem in the country. Minnesota Republicans who ran in congressional races in 2020 for smaller population centers and rural areas in Greater Minnesota, such as Michelle Fischbach and Jim Hagedorn, echoed Trump’s "law and order" rhetoric about unrest in the Twin Cities in their campaign messaging for races they won.

Several participants in local protests after Floyd's murder later ran for public office, including Minnesota Representative John Thompson who won in 2020, Minneapolis mayoral candidate Sheila Nezhad who lost in 2021, and Minneapolis City Counselor Robin Wonsley who won in 2021. In the 2021 Minneapolis municipal election, voters in Minneapolis reelected Jacob Frey to another mayoral term and rejected the Question 2 ballot measure that would have replaced the Minneapolis Police Department with a Department of Public Safety. The state response to the riots was a major campaign issue for Scott Jensen in his quest to defeat incumbent governor Tim Walz in the 2022 Minnesota elections with imagery of riot damage featured in television advertisements. Walz, however, prevailed in the race to win reelection. In 2025, Soren Stevenson, who had lost an eye after being hit by a police-fired projectile during the unrest, was elected to the Minneapolis City Council.

The news media renewed its focus on the response to the 2020 unrest following Walz's selection as the 2024 Democratic Party vice presidential candidate. Some Republicans criticized Walz for delaying deployment of the National Guard as unrest unfolded in Minneapolis. The riot response timeline became the topic of media analysis and fact checking. Some claims about the response were deemed misleading as Walz activated the guard on May 28 at the formal request of local officials and by May 30 it reached full mobilization levels and the violent protests waned.

=== COVID-19 pandemic ===
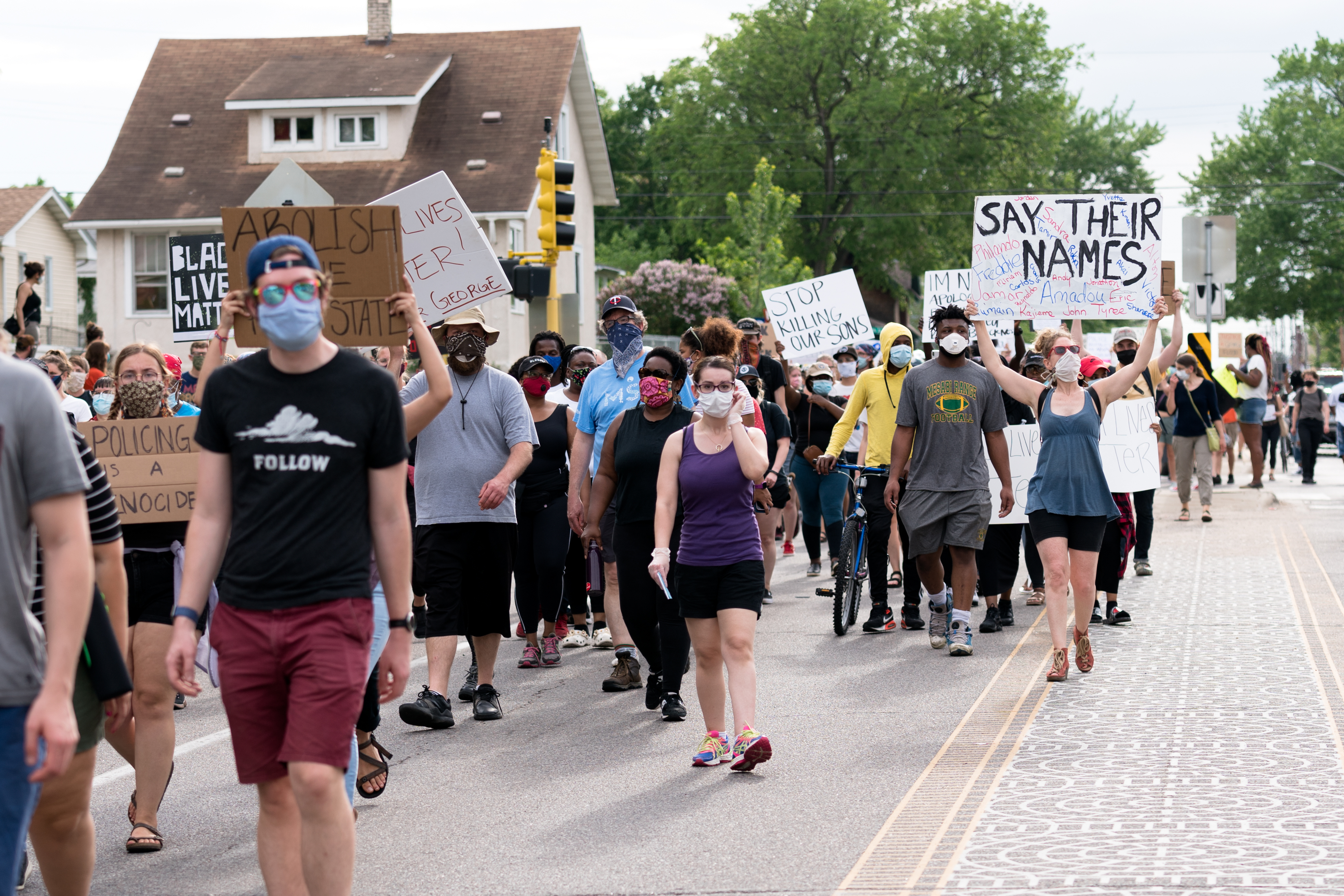
Protesters wearing protective masks in Minneapolis, May 26, 2020.

Civic unrest after Floyd's murder came in the middle of the global COVID-19 pandemic caused by the spread of the SARS-CoV-2 respiratory infection. People wearing protective masks became a common sight at protests, but social distancing proved difficult in large crowds. Many protesters had to weigh the risk of being infected with the virus against the desire to call for police accountability and structural change in Minneapolis. Health officials in Minnesota warned that mass protests could exacerbate the spread of the virus in Minnesota and trigger a surge in the outbreak that has a disproportionate impact on minority communities.

In early June 2020, the Minnesota Department of Health established free testing clinics with the help of community organizations and encouraged people who participated in protests to get tested. By June 18, 2020, of the 3,200 people tested at four popup sites in the metropolitan region, 1.8 percent tested positive for SARS-CoV-2, while testing by private health care provider HealthPartners had a 0.99 percent positive rate among the 8,500 people it tested who said they attended a mass gathering. A state health department official who reviewed the data said that protest events were not a major source of SARS-CoV-2 transmission.

=== Pharmacies and the Illicit drug market ===
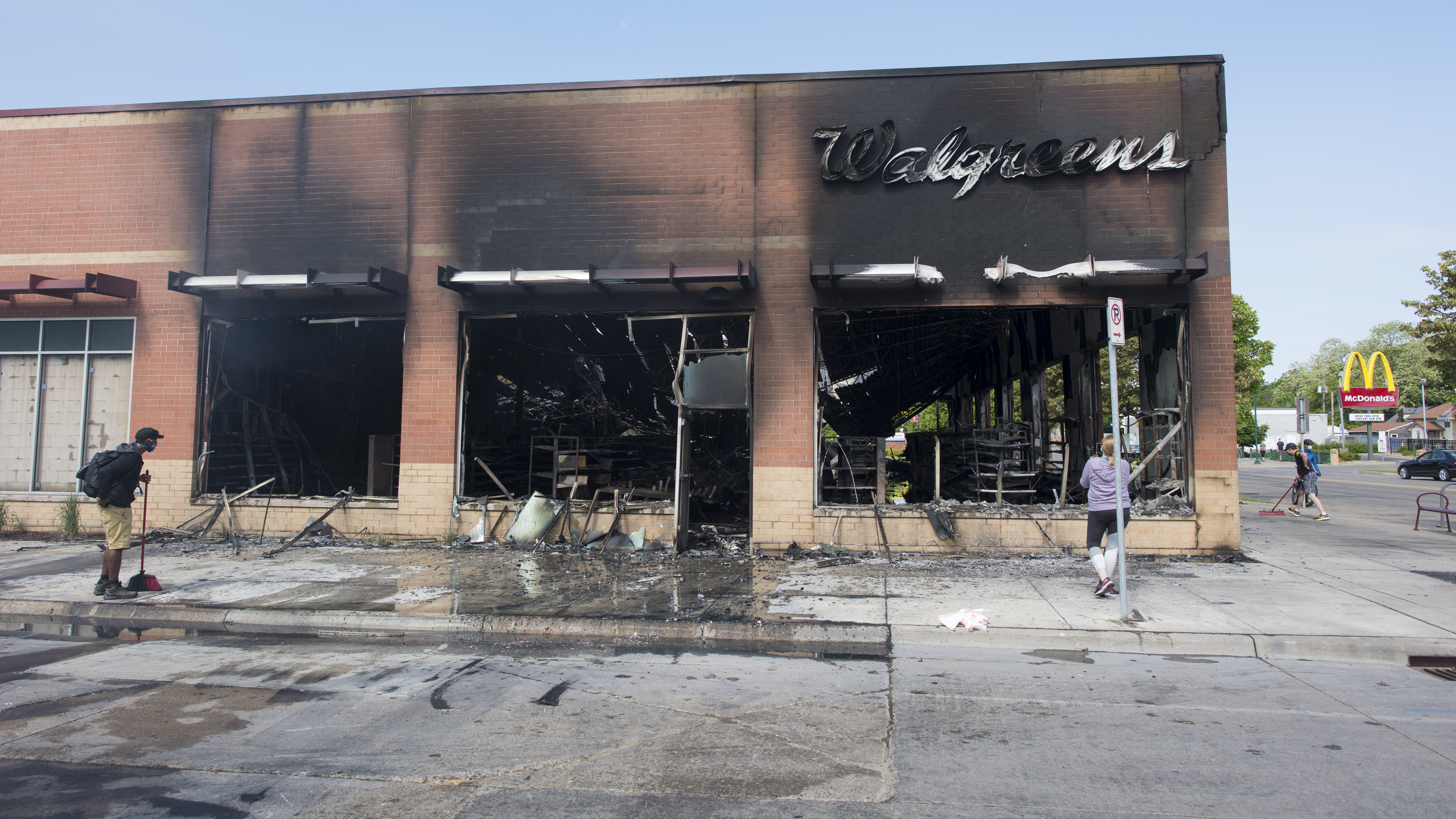
A destroyed Walgreens store on East Lake Street in Minneapolis, May 30, 2020

At least 20 pharmacies in the metropolitan region were plundered or burned to the ground in late May 2020. Attacks on pharmacies affected both chain pharmacies, such as those owned by Cub, CVS, and Walgreens, and the independent pharmacies, such as Seward's and Banadir's in Minneapolis and Lloyd's in Saint Paul. During several nights of heavy looting, some pharmacies in Minneapolis and Saint Paul contacted the federal Drug Enforcement Administration (DEA) to request the agency hold their stock of controlled drugs to keep them safe, but the agency refused, saying it did not have the authority to store drugs.

The DEA later estimated that one million doses of pills and syrups, with a street value of $15 million, were either stolen or destroyed. A DEA agent concluded that a dangerous amount of narcotics had flooded the streets of the Twin Cities after the unrest. Officials speculated during the riots that drug cartels were among those seeking to exploit the chaotic events. The FBI, however, later said much of the looting was opportunistic.

The historic Lloyd's Pharmacy building on Snelling Avenue in Saint Paul, which had its origin in 1918 as Florian's, was looted over five hours and burned to the ground on May 29, 2020. A reconstructed Lloyd's pharmacy building at the same site reopened in July 2021.

=== Crime statistics ===
Minneapolis experienced a surge in violent crime and gunfire incidents after the unrest in late May 2020. While there was no single agreed to cause to the rise of violence, Floyd's murder exacerbated many underlying social causes and served as a catalyst. Much of the elevated levels of violent crime was concentrated in areas of the fourth and third police precincts, which were among the poorest and most racially diverse areas of the city and where much of the heaviest rioting and looting took place. The record or near-record levels of gunfire, homicides, assaults, and armed carjackings reported in the city remained elevated throughout all of 2020 and 2021. People of color in Minneapolis were disproportionately affected by the increase in gunfire homicides. The elevated levels of violent crime after Floyd's murder were compared to the city's experience with higher crime rates in the 1990s when it was occasionally referred to by the disparaging moniker, "Murderapolis".

In the year after Floyd's murder and the historic unrest, the Minneapolis police force declined by about 300 officers, from a prior maximum of 888, due to a combination of resignations, terminations, retirements, and medical leave. While the city experienced an increase in the number of violent crimes reported and emergency calls to 9-1-1 in 2020 and 2021, Minneapolis police responded to fewer incidents, made fewer arrests, and investigated or solved a lower percentage of criminal cases. Some criminalists and conservative media suggested the city experienced a "Minneapolis Effect", which alluded to the contested "Ferguson Effect" hypothesis in the aftermath of the 2014 shooting of Michael Brown where less-active policing was theorized to have contributed to increases in the rates of homicides and other violent crimes in the U.S. state of Missouri. Increases in violent crime rates in Minneapolis in 2020 and 2021 were similar to other cities that experienced unrest following a police killing, such as Baltimore in 2015 with the killing of Freddy Gray in police custody.

New York Times columnist Thomas Friedman characterized Minneapolis as a "dangerous and dystopian ghost city, racked by gun violence, since the police murder of George Floyd" in a June 22, 2021, opinion article. The piece, which also criticized the "defund the police" movement, received rebuke from local media for in their view mischaracterizing the social and economic plight of the city. While the Minneapolis-based Star Tribune newspaper's editorial board criticized Friedman for overstating problems in Minneapolis, it said on June 28, 2021, that the levels of gun violence in the city had reached "intolerable" levels. Data analysis by the Star Tribune in mid 2022 found that the local increases in violent crime in the years after Floyd's murder were not consistent across the Minneapolis–Saint Paul metropolitan area. The largest increases in violent crime occurred in Minneapolis, and to a less extent in it northern suburbs, with some researchers placing blame on the police killings of Floyd and Daunte Wright in Brooklyn Center in 2021 as factors that eroded trust in policing and authority.

=== Encampments ===
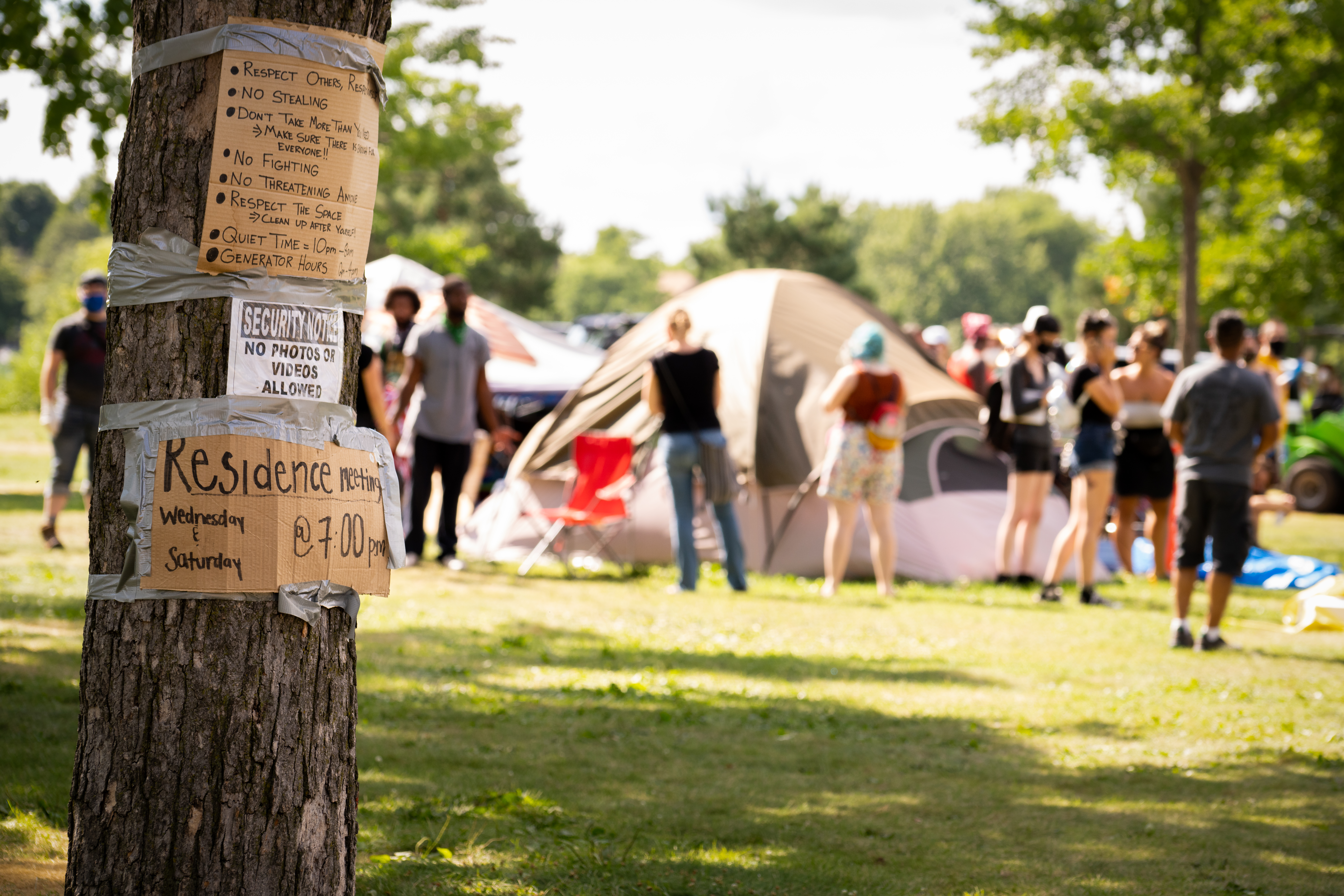
Encampment in Powderhorn Park, July 20, 2020.

The civil disorder affected people experiencing homelessness and led to temporary changes in city policies on homeless encampments. In late May 2020, about 200 unhoused persons sought refuge in a Sheraton hotel in the city's Midtown neighborhood that had been closed during the riots. Over several weeks, the situation in the hotel descended into chaos with extensive vandalism, rampant drug use, and violence. Those taking refuge at the hotel were evicted in mid June 2020 and with the help of volunteers some set up a camp at the city's Powderhorn Park that grew to about 800 people by mid July 2020.

Neighbors of the Powdernhorn Park encampment grew weary of it after numerous reports of sexual assaults, fights, and drug use. The Minneapolis Park and Recreation Board cleared the park of people living in tents in late July 2020, but the board voted to create a permitting process to make homeless encampments a fixture at up to 20 city parks with up to 25 tents each. The encampment situation, however, quickly grew out of the control of park board officials as unpermitted encampments spread to 40 park sites by mid year with thousands of residents, including many who came from outside of Minneapolis to live in the parks. Permitted encampments in city parks persisted until the park board closed the last remaining one on January 7, 2021.

Four people died in encampments in Minneapolis city parks between June 2020 and January 2021, including a man who was stabbed to death inside a tent at Minnehaha Park on January 3, 2021.

== Investigations and civil claims ==
=== Law enforcement conduct ===
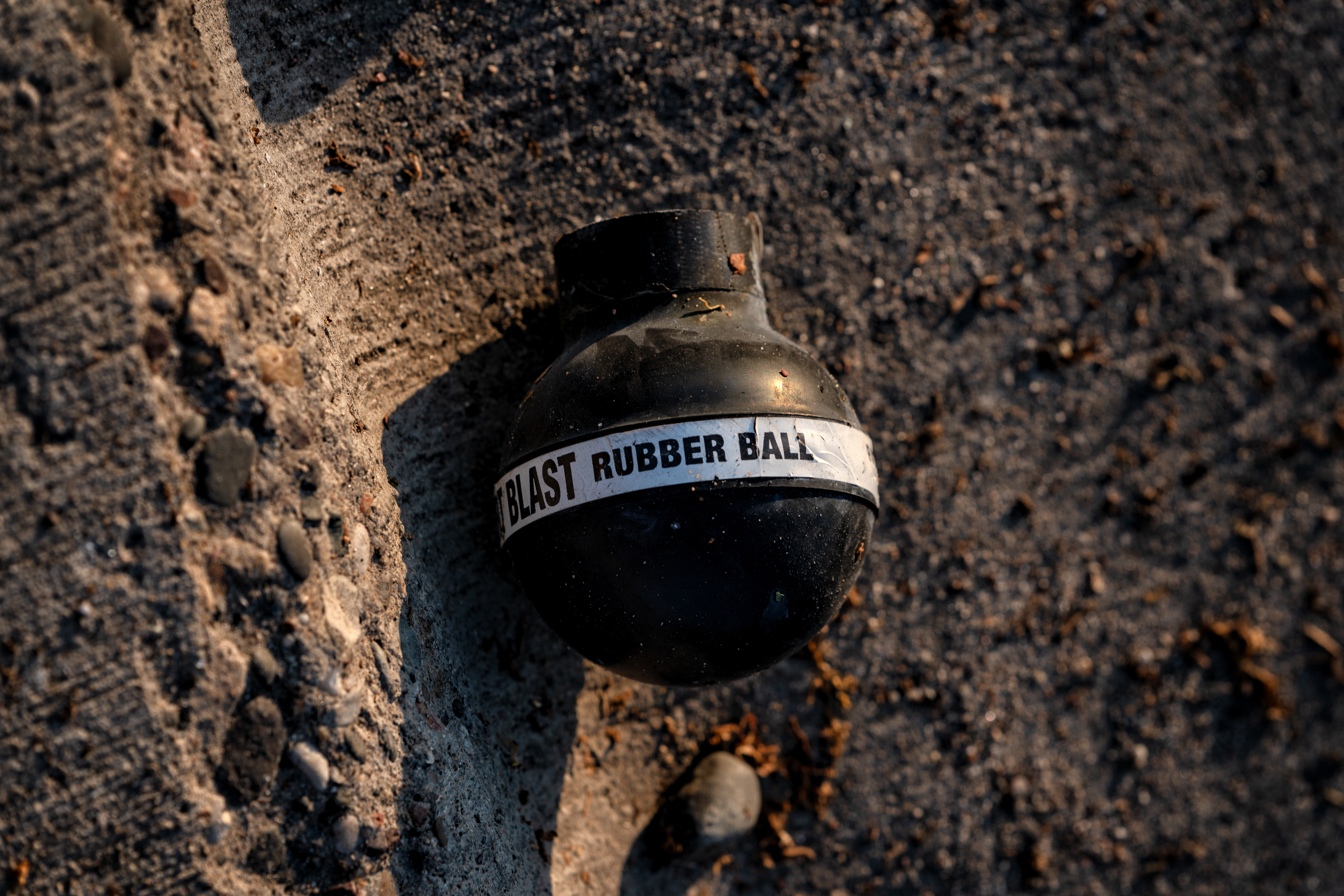
A discarded rubber blast grenade shell near the Minneapolis Police Department's 5th precinct building, May 30, 2020.

Several demonstrators and members of the press alleged that the Minneapolis police used excessive force and retaliation. Two Minneapolis police officers faced disciplinary actions related to the riot response. One police officer received disciplinary action for speaking anonymously with a news reporter about what she viewed as a toxic workplace culture at the police department. A second officer received disciplinary action for failing to report that they hit two people with rubber bullets three days after Floyd's murder. Approximately 550 complaints were filed against law enforcement for tactics used against protesters during the two-week period following Floyd's murder, such as the firing of less-lethal munitions, tear gas, and use of excessive force on demonstrators who were engaging in peaceful activities.

The United States Justice Department announced in mid 2021, an investigation of the City of Minneapolis and Minneapolis Police Department for excessive force used against those engaging in activities protected by the First Amendment. Its report, released in 2023, found that they city's police had a pattern and practice of using deadly and other force excessively, of disproportionately searching and stopping Black and Native American people, of violating the free-speech rights of protesters, and of discriminating against people with behavior health disabilities during emergency responses. About the report, Attorney General Merrick Garland said that “the patterns and practices we observed made what happened to George Floyd possible". The city and the U.S. Department of Justice's Civil Rights Division entered into a consent decree to bring federal oversight of policy reforms. In 2025, the second Trump administration, with approval of U.S. District Judge Paul Magnuson, dissolved the arrangement.

=== Liabilities and lawsuit settlements ===
The City of Minneapolis faced $111 million in legal liabilities dating to the weeks after Floyd's murder. Of the total claims, $84 million stemmed from 13 officer-misconduct claims tied to incidents that happened up to 15 days after Floyd's murder during protests and riots. The city reached a $2.4 million settlement with a Soren Stevenson, a protester who was struck by a rubber bullet while standing on a closed Interstate 35W onramp shortly before curfew on May 31, 2020, and who later lost his right eye due the injuries he sustained. The city reached separate $900,000 settlements with two women who were hit by police projectiles in the face during protests in late May 2020; the woman said they were struck by police-fired projectiles even they were not participating in rioting or looting. By March 2022, the city had settled three smaller lawsuits. In October 2022, the city council approved $700,000 in settlements for several pending lawsuits, including $50,000 for Nekima Levy Armstrong, from unreasonable and excessive force claims during the response to protests in May 2020. In the two years after Floyd's murder, the city also settled $22.2 million in worker's compensation for 144 police department officers, many of who retired early due to disability, with some citing post-traumatic stress disorder. In 2024, the city settled a $950,000 lawsuit with seven journalists who were harassed or injured by police during the protests. Over six years after the unrest, the City of Minneapolis had settled $11 million in total lawsuits related to the police response.

=== After-action reports ===
In October 2020, Minnesota Senate Republicans released a 61-page report that placed blame on Walz and Frey for not doing enough to quell rioting behavior as the situation escalated in late May. The report was based on media stories, social media posts, and mid 2020 legislative hearings on the government response to unrest in the metro region. Minnesota Democratic–Farmer–Labor Party Senators criticized the report for not mentioning Derek Chauvin, the officer who murdered Floyd, or the reasons for the community's prevailing distrust of the Minneapolis Police Department as factors fueling public outrage.

Officials for the City of Minneapolis and the State of Minnesota commissioned separate after-action reports on the response to civil disorder in the wake of Floyd's murder. Released in early 2022, the two reports written by different consultants reached the same conclusions about the failed emergency response. The reports criticized the local officials for not following emergency protocols, the state and local officials for failing to quickly coordinate the response to looting and arson, and the 18-hour delay in the deployment of the state's National Guard after the initial request by Mayor Frey to Governor Walz. The reports also faulted law enforcement for indiscriminately firing less-lethal munitions and tear gas at demonstrators, including at those who were not engaging in violent actions.

== Media coverage ==
The documentary Say His Name: Five Days for George Floyd, released in 2021 and aired on Twin Cities PBS, contained footage of protests and unrest in south Minneapolis in the five days that elapsed between Floyd's murder and the criminal charges being filed against the four police officers. The director, Cy Dodson, lived in the neighborhood and filmed what he observed. In 2022, far-right media personality Candace Owens released the documentary, The Greatest Lie Ever Sold: George Floyd and the Rise of BLM, about the aftermath of the protests. Progressive magazine Mother Jones dismissed Owen's film as "political propaganda" and Rolling Stone referred to it as a "conspiratorial feature". The four-part Showtime docuseries "Boys in Blue" that debuted in 2023 followed the story of the challenges faced by the North Community High School football team in the aftermath of the murder of George Floyd.

The Minneapolis-based Star Tribune newspaper received the 2021 Pulitzer Prize for its reporting on Floyd's murder and the resulting aftermath. Darnella Frazier, the then 17-year old who filmed Floyd's arrest and murder on her cellphone, also received a Pulitzer special citation recognition in 2021 for her video.

== Maps ==
Major areas of civic unrest in Minneapolis and Saint Paul, May 27–29, 2020:

East Lake Street in Minneapolis

University Avenue West, in Saint Paul

Nicollet Avenue in Minneapolis

== See also ==
- 2020–2021 United States racial unrest
- George Floyd and Anti-Racist Street Art database
- George Floyd protests in Minnesota
- History of Minneapolis
- List of incidents of civil unrest in Minneapolis–Saint Paul
- Police brutality in the United States
