= List of lakes in Minneapolis =

Minneapolis's lakes (dark blue); light blue bodies of water are included in the City of Minneapolis's official count but are either smaller than five acres (two hectares), channels between lakes, or entirely outside Minneapolis's borders. See other bodies of water for more.

There are 13 lakes of at least five acres (two hectares) (Note: Moss et al. suggested that for a body of water to be considered a lake, it should cover at least two hectares (five acres). However, there is no universally accepted criterion or set of criteria for what constitutes a lake versus a pond.) within the borders of Minneapolis in the U.S. state of Minnesota. Of these, Bde Maka Ska is the largest and deepest, covering 421 acres (170.37 ha) with a maximum depth of 89.9 feet (27.4 m). Lake Hiawatha, through which Minnehaha Creek flows, has a watershed of 115,840 acres (468.79 km^{2}), two orders of magnitude larger than the next largest watershed in the city. Ryan Lake, in the city's north, sits partially in Minneapolis and partially in neighboring Robbinsdale. Certain other bodies of water are counted on some lists of Minneapolitan lakes, though they may fall outside the city limits or cover fewer than five acres.

Many of Minneapolis's lakes formed in the depressions left by large blocks of ice after the retreat of the Laurentide Ice Sheet at the end of the last glacial period and now overlie sandy or loamy soils. Before the appearance of white settlers, the Dakota harvested wild rice from the lakes. In the early 1800s, the lakes' shorelines were marshy, deterring large-scale settlement and development by white residents though an experimental Dakota agricultural community, Ḣeyate Otuŋwe, was founded on the banks of Bde Maka Ska by Maḣpiya Wic̣aṡṭa in 1829. In the 1880s, landscape architect Horace Cleveland foresaw Minneapolis's growth and made a series of recommendations to the city's Board of Park Commissioners to acquire land along Minnehaha Creek, near Minnehaha Falls, and around several lakes in the southwest portion of the city in order to form a robust, interconnected park system that would aesthetically and morally benefit the city's residents. Board president Charles M. Loring heeded Cleveland's advice and bought the land, later developed into a robust system of parks by Theodore Wirth. During this time, many of the lakes were reformed by the Board of Park Commissioners through draining, dredging, shoreline stabilization, and the construction of parkways around their perimeters. Property in neighborhoods surrounding the lakes grew desirable, especially by the "Chain of Lakes", five lakes in the southwestern portion of the city (Maka Ska, Harriet, Isles, Cedar, and Brownie) that were joined by artificial channels.

Various municipal symbols and icons reference the presence of the lakes in Minneapolitan life and culture, from the sailboat in the city's logo to the ship's wheel on its flag to Minneapolis's nickname, the "City of Lakes". Much of Minneapolis's lakeshore is public parkland, in contrast to other American cities where lakeside property tends to be privately controlled. Since they were dredged, the lakes have drawn city residents for recreation and sport including swimming, sailing, yachting, canoeing, biking, jogging, and ice skating. The 76-mile (122.3 km) Grand Rounds National Scenic Byway passes around many of Minneapolis's lakes.

== List of lakes ==
Lake	Image	Area	Maximum depth	Watershed area	Coordinates	Notes	Refs.
Brownie Lake	An aerial shot of a small, slightly oblong lake surrounded on all sides by green trees. On the upper lefthand side are some houses and another lake. The sky is overcast.	18 acres (0.07 km^{2})	49.9 feet (15.2 m)	369 acres (1.49 km^{2})	44°58′03″N 93°19′27″W	Part of the Chain of Lakes; Located in the Bryn Mawr neighborhood	
Cedar Lake	The lake and wooded far shore of Cedar Lake on a sunny day	170 acres (0.69 km^{2})	50.9 feet (15.5 m)	1,956 acres (7.92 km^{2})	44°57′36″N 93°19′16″W	Part of the Chain of Lakes; Previously known as Lake Snelling	
Cemetery Lake	Thick bright green bushes grow on the near shore of a small, clear lake; trees stand on the far shore.	11 acres (0.04 km^{2})	Unknown	Unknown	44°55′58″N 93°18′22″W	Also known as Jo Pond; Artificial lake; Located in Lakewood Cemetery	
Diamond Lake	A placid lake reflects the clouds in the blue sky above it. A dark tree crosses the foreground.	41 acres (0.17 km^{2})	6.9 feet (2.1 m)	669 acres (2.71 km^{2})	44°54′02″N 93°16′09″W		
Grass Lake	A thin lake extends away from the camera; spits of land extend into the lake from either side in the midground and trees surround the lake's shore.	27 acres (0.11 km^{2})	4.9 feet (1.5 m)	386 acres (1.56 km^{2})	44°53′34″N 93°17′54″W	Located in the Kenny neighborhood	
Lake Harriet	An aerial view of Lake Harriet surrounded by parkland and mostly low residential buildings	353 acres (1.43 km^{2})	82.0 feet (25.0 m)	1,139 acres (4.61 km^{2})	44°55′19″N 93°18′22″W	Part of the Chain of Lakes	
Lake Hiawatha	A placid lake lies under a pink/blue afternoon sky. In the foreground is a well groomed lawn and a border of plants, including a sunflower, that encircles that lake.	54 acres (0.22 km^{2})	23.0 feet (7.0 m)	115,840 acres (468.79 km^{2})	44°55′16″N 93°14′10″W	Last lake on Minnehaha Creek before Minnehaha Falls; Previously known as Mud Lake and Rice Lake	
Lake of the Isles	Two small, oblong islands sit in the side of Lake of the Isles, viewed from the air on a smokey day.	103 acres (0.42 km^{2})	30.8 feet (9.4 m)	735 acres (2.97 km^{2})	44°57′18″N 93°18′35″W	Part of the Chain of Lakes	
Loring Lake	Numerous tall buildings are visible across a small lake full of duckweed. Ducks stand among the low reeds and aquatic grasses.	8 acres (0.03 km^{2})	17.4 feet (5.3 m)	24 acres (0.10 km^{2})	44°58′08″N 93°17′04″W	Also known as Loring Pond; Located in Loring Park	
Bde Maka Ska	An aerial view of Bde Maka Ska, a mostly round lake with two nubby "legs" at its bottom end, surrounded mostly by parks and houses. Downtown Minneapolis is visible at the top of the image.	421 acres (1.70 km^{2})	89.9 feet (27.4 m)	2,992 acres (12.11 km^{2})	44°56′31″N 93°18′42″W	Part of the Chain of Lakes; Previously known as Lake Calhoun	
Lake Nokomis	Gray storm clouds roll over green trees and plants that rim a choppy gray lake	204 acres (0.83 km^{2})	33.1 feet (10.1 m)	869 acres (3.52 km^{2})	44°54′31″N 93°14′31″W	Previously known as Lake Amelia	
Powderhorn Lake	Willows sit atop a small island in the center of a small, frozen, snow-covered lake surrounded by parkland and residences.	11 acres (0.04 km^{2})	20.0 feet (6.1 m)	286 acres (1.16 km^{2})	44°56′30″N 93°15′24″W	Located in Powderhorn Park	
Ryan Lake	A dock that widens at the end extends out into a choppy lake on a cloudy day.	18 acres (0.07 km^{2})	35.1 feet (10.7 m)	5,510 acres (22.30 km^{2})	45°02′28″N 93°19′20″W	Located in the Victory neighborhood	

== Other bodies of water ==
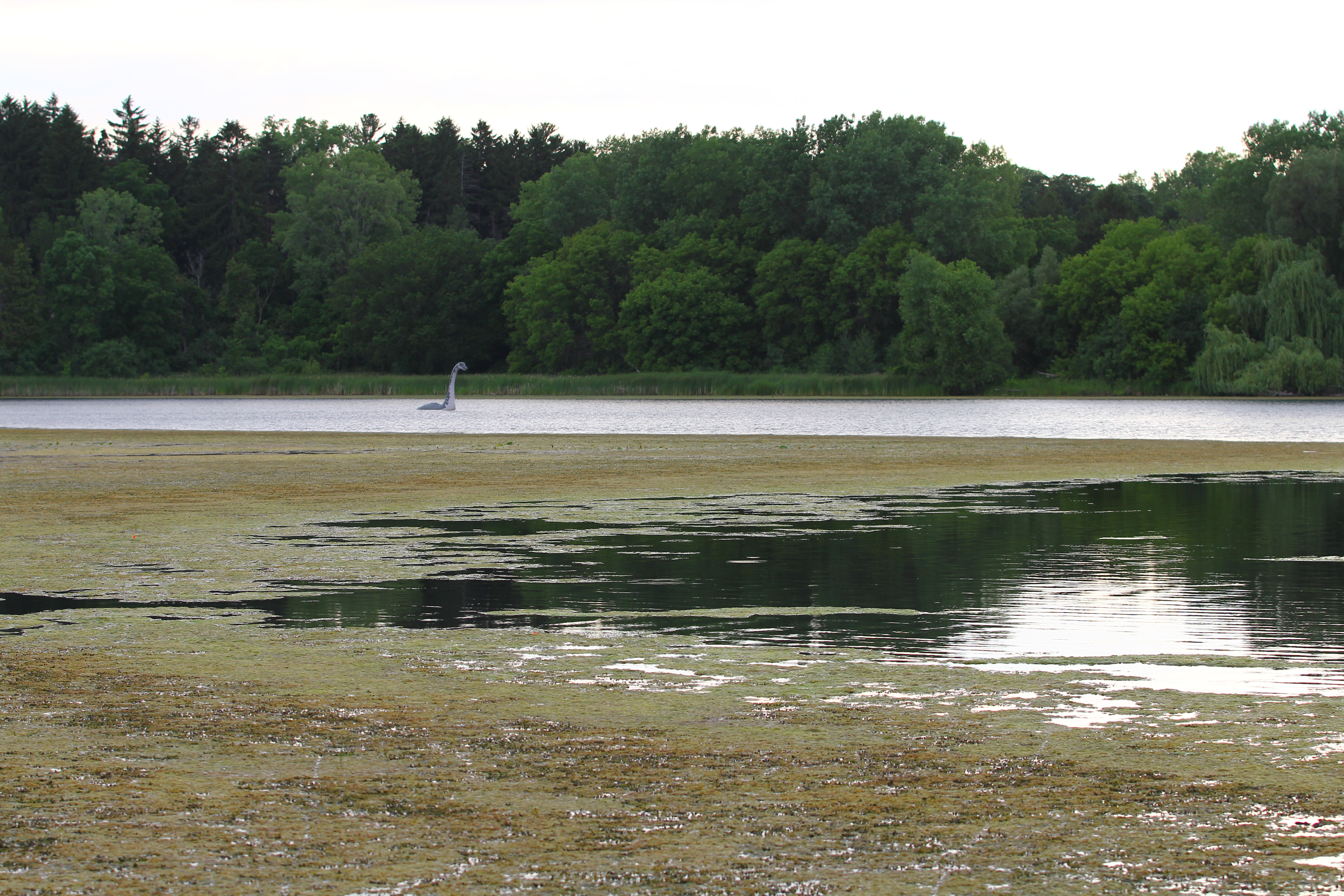

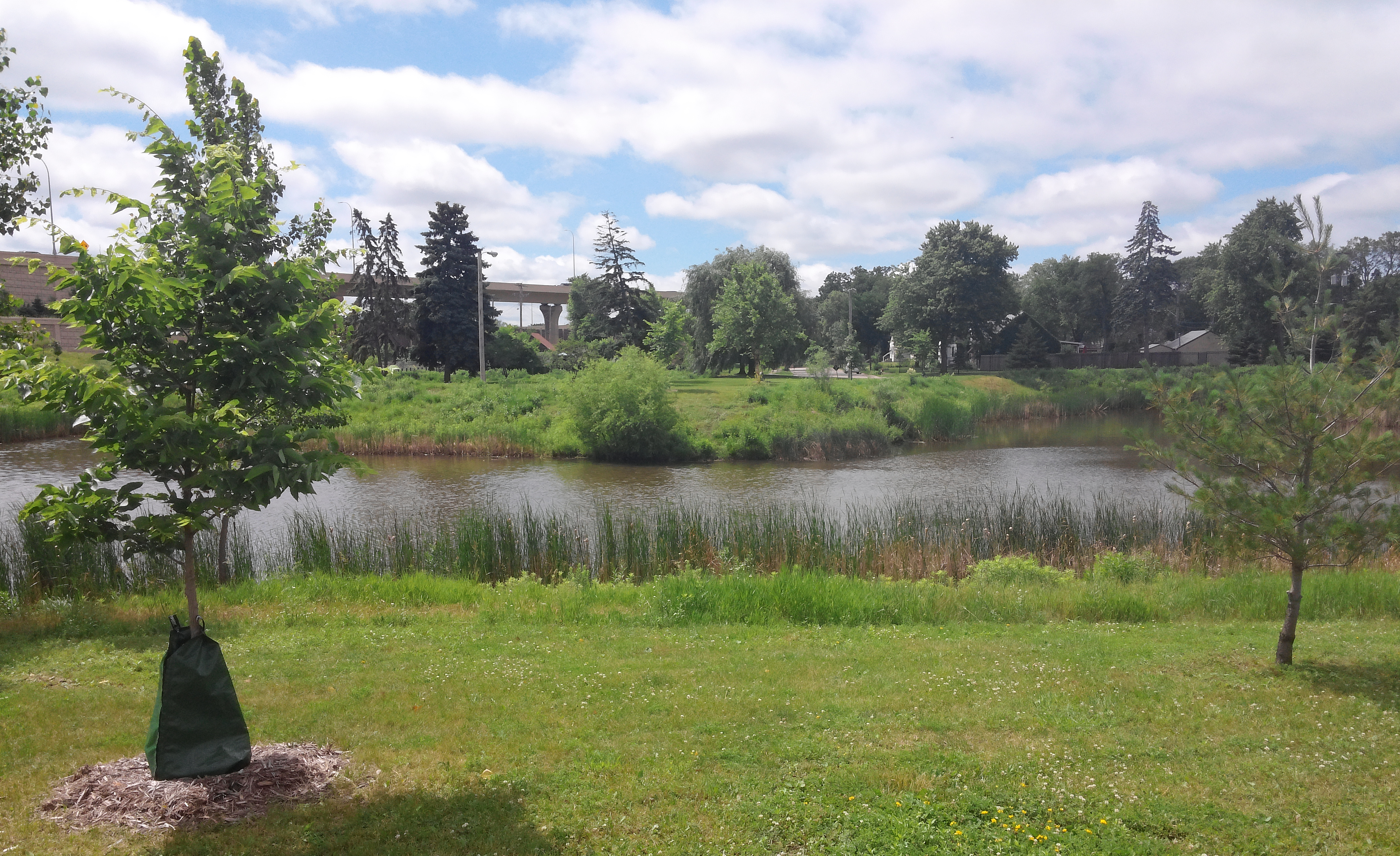
Wirth Lake (top) sits in Minneapolis Park and Recreation Board-managed property in Golden Valley; Lake Mead (bottom) is less than five acres.

Some sources, including the City of Minneapolis's own geographic information system (GIS) dataset, list up to 22 lakes within the city. The dataset lists three lakes that are not within the city's borders:

- Mother Lake (48 acres [0.19 km^{2}])
- Wirth Lake (39 acres [0.16 km^{2}]) (Note: Wirth Lake is a component of Theodore Wirth Regional Park, a Minneapolis Park and Recreation Board-managed property that is mostly located within the borders of Golden Valley. The Minneapolis Park and Recreation Board was established in 1883 by the Minnesota Legislature and is a distinct entity from the City of Minneapolis, with its own power to levy taxes and acquire land.)
- Taft Lake (14 acres [0.06 km^{2}])

The list includes some bodies of water smaller than five acres:

- Birch Lake (3.2 acres [12,949.94 m^{2}])
- Spring Lake (2.3 acres [9,307.77 m^{2}])
- Lake Mead (1.8 acres [7,284.34 m^{2}])
- Legion Lake (0.5 acres [2,023.43 m^{2}])

The Minneapolis GIS dataset includes two of the channels between larger bodies of water as "lakes":

- Cedar–Isles Channel (5.4 acres [21,853.02 m^{2}])
- Maka Ska–Isles Channel (3.4 acres [13,759.31 m^{2}])

Additionally, there are 46 ponds in Minneapolis.

== Former lakes ==
Sandy Lake once existed in the Columbia Park neighborhood, however was destroyed in 1925 and replaced with the Columbia Golf Club.

Pearl Lake once existed in the Page neighborhood, and has since been filled in and replaced by Pearl Park.

Richfield Mill Pond was a man-made lake along Minnehaha Creek directly south of Lake Harriet in what is now Lynnhurst. In 1892, it was destroyed along with the mill responsible for its creation to make way for housing.

Blaisdell Lake once existed east of Lake of the Isles, and was filled in to make way for Lyndale Avenue in 1890.

Silver Lake was destroyed after it was sold off by property developers in 1889.

== See also ==
- List of lakes in Minnesota
- Trails in Minneapolis
