= List of botanical gardens and arboretums in Minnesota =

Botanical gardens in Minnesota, United States

This list of botanical gardens and arboretums in Minnesota is intended to include all significant botanical gardens and arboretums in the U.S. state of Minnesota.

Name	Image	Affiliation	City
Bergeson Gardens		Bergeson Nursery	Fertile
Eloise Butler Wildflower Garden and Bird Sanctuary		Theodore Wirth Park	Minneapolis
Carleton College Cowling Arboretum		Carleton College	Northfield
Como Park Zoo and Conservatory			Saint Paul
Leif Erickson Park & Rose Garden			Duluth
The Arboretum at Gustavus Adolphus College		Gustavus Adolphus College	St. Peter
Lyndale Park Gardens	Phelps fountain	Lyndale Park	Minneapolis
Minnesota Landscape Arboretum		University of Minnesota	Chanhassen
Munsinger Gardens and Clemens Gardens			St. Cloud
Northland Arboretum		Paul Bunyan Conservation Area	Brainerd
Olcott Park Greenhouse			Virginia
Saint John's Arboretum		Saint John's Abbey; College of Saint Benedict and Saint John's University	Collegeville

== See also ==
- List of botanical gardens and arboretums in the United States
