= Lyndale Park =

Park in Minneapolis, Minnesota, United States

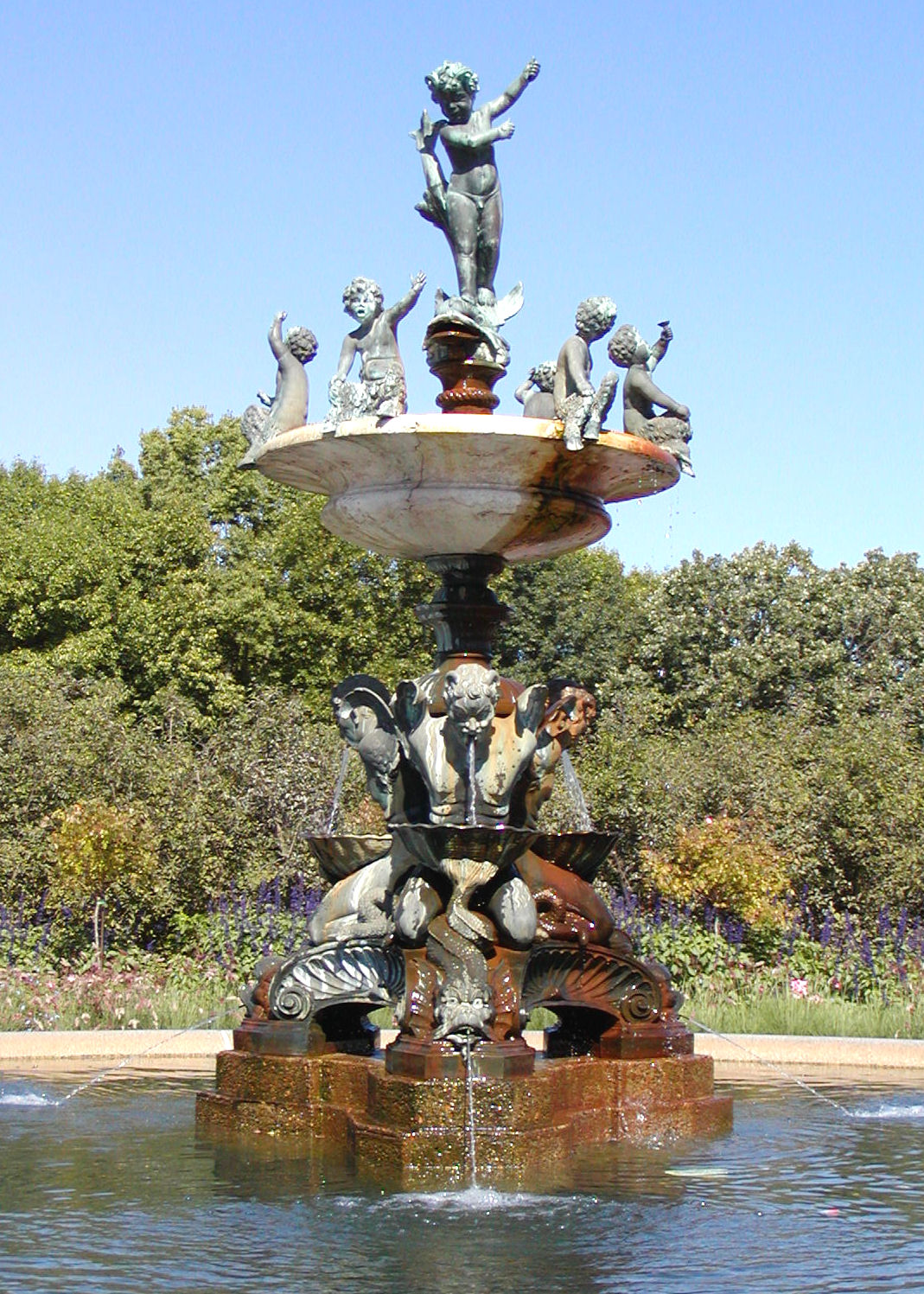
- Heffelfinger fountain
- Interactive map of Lyndale Park
- Type: Urban park
- Location: Minneapolis, Minnesota
- Coordinates: 44°55′39″N 93°17′45″W
- Area: 61 acres (25 ha)
- Created: 1907
- Website: Official website

Lyndale Park is a Minneapolis city park on the northeast side of Lake Harriet. It is next to Lakewood Cemetery, southeast of Bde Maka Ska. It is part of an enormous greenspace circling through Minneapolis called the Grand Rounds Scenic Byway, and is one of the seven districts within, called the Chain of Lakes. The other six districts within Grand Rounds are the Downtown Riverfront, Mississippi River, Minnehaha, Theodore Wirth, Victory Memorial Parkway, and Northeast. Managed by the Minneapolis Park and Recreation Board, the 53-mile (85 km) parkway system has numerous parks and parkways, lakes (22 within the city limits), streams and creeks, the Mississippi River, and the 53-foot (16 m) high Minnehaha Falls. The 6,400-acre (26 km^{2}) park system is designed so that every home in Minneapolis is within six blocks of green space.

Lyndale Park is 61 acres (250,000 m^{2}) and contains four gardens; the Peace Garden, the Rose Garden, the Perennial Garden, and the Perennial Trial Garden. Immediately adjacent to the Peace Garden is the Thomas Sadler Roberts Bird Sanctuary.

== Arboretum ==
The park's arboretum was conceived by Theodore Wirth in 1907 and by 1915 the bulk of the collection had been planted. Many of the original plantings still survive. Major collections include roses and crabapple trees. Heritage trees, defined as the oldest or largest specimen found within the city limits, include the Cucumber Magnolia, River Birch, Golden Larch, Mugo Pine, White Fir, Austrian Pine, Japanese Yew, and Wafer Ash. In 2026, the park was certified as a level II arboretum.

== Rose Gardens ==
This is the second oldest public rose garden in the United States and was designed by the Park Superintendent Theodore Wirth. It is 1-acre (4,000 m^{2}) in size and at peak season the garden can contain as many as 60,000 blooms. Construction of the garden occurred during 1907–08. An official AARS (All America Rose Selections) test rose garden was added in 1946. The garden features more than 4000 plants and 250 species. Two fountains border the garden; the bronze-and-marble Heffelfinger Fountain is from the Villa Montalto near Florence, Italy and donated to the Park Board by Frank Heffelfinger in 1944. There is a cherub surfing on a dolphin at the top, surrounded by satyrs. Human faces on the pedestal base show the progress of age.

== Annual-Perennial Garden and Border Garden ==
The Annual-Perennial Garden was built in 1962-63 when the Phelps (turtle) fountain was moved from the downtown Gateway to the east end of this garden. Two long perennial borders edge this garden and six annual beds are featured between these borders. Many wedding ceremonies are performed in this garden area located between the Phelps and Heffelfinger fountains.

The Border Garden was originally installed in 1924 by Louis Boeglin, the Minneapolis Park and Recreation Board horticulturalist. Located on the north end of the park, near King's Highway, the garden originally stretching 1,000 feet in length with widths ranging from four to twenty feet. In 1996, the Men's Garden Club of Minneapolis entered an agreement with the Minneapolis Park Board and University of Minnesota to plant and maintain a trial garden within the former Border Garden footprint. While the trials ended in 2014, the garden club, now called the Garden Club of Minneapolis, continued to maintain the site.

== Thomas Sadler Roberts Bird Sanctuary ==
Officially designated as a bird sanctuary in 1936 at the request of the Minnesota Audubon Society. In 1947, the site was named for Thomas Sadler Roberts, a retired doctor who worked as a professor of ornithology at the University of Minnesota and the director of the University's Museum of Natural History. The main entrance to the sanctuary is in the Lyndale Park Gardens parking lot, and trails through that back of the Peace Garden. Named for Thomas Sadler Roberts, M.D., D.Sc. (1858–1946), Founding Member of the Minneapolis Young Naturalists Society, and the American Ornithologists' Union, and member of the Minnesota Ornithologists' Union.

== Lyndale Farmstead Park ==
Another park with a similar name, Lyndale Farmstead Park, is a separate park located between West 38th Street and West 40th Street on Bryant Avenue South. Lyndale Farmstead Park contains a recreation center and the Theodore Wirth house, Theodore Wirth House-Administration Building. The house is on the National Register of Historic Places.

"Lyndale Park - A Guide to the Arboretum" (Document). Minneapolis Park and Recreation Board. 2004. pp. 1–8.

"Lyndale Park - A Guide to the Perennial & Annual Display and Trial Gardens" (Document). Minneapolis Park and Recreation Board. 2006. pp. 1–8.

== Image gallery Arboretum ==
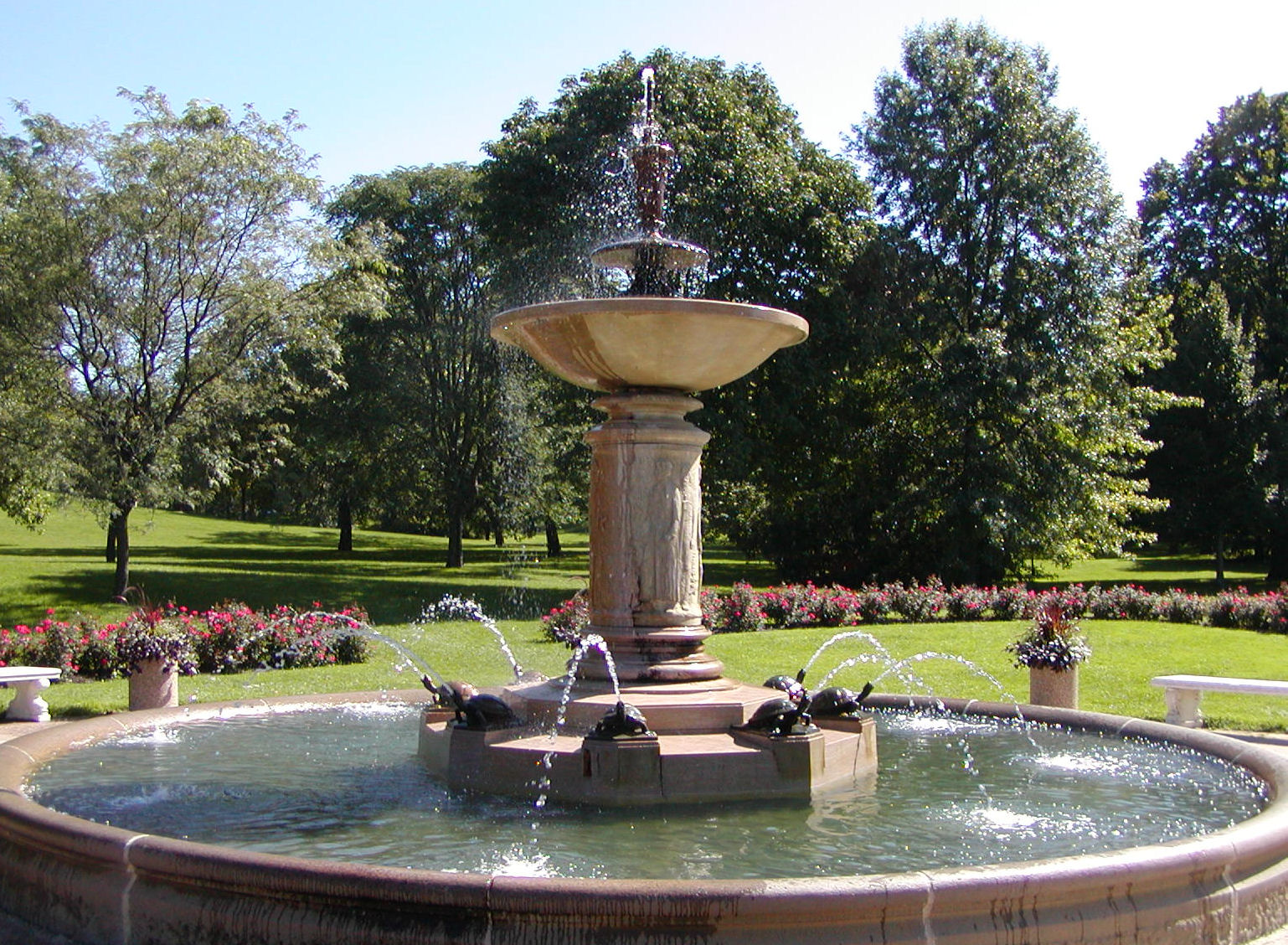
Phelps fountain

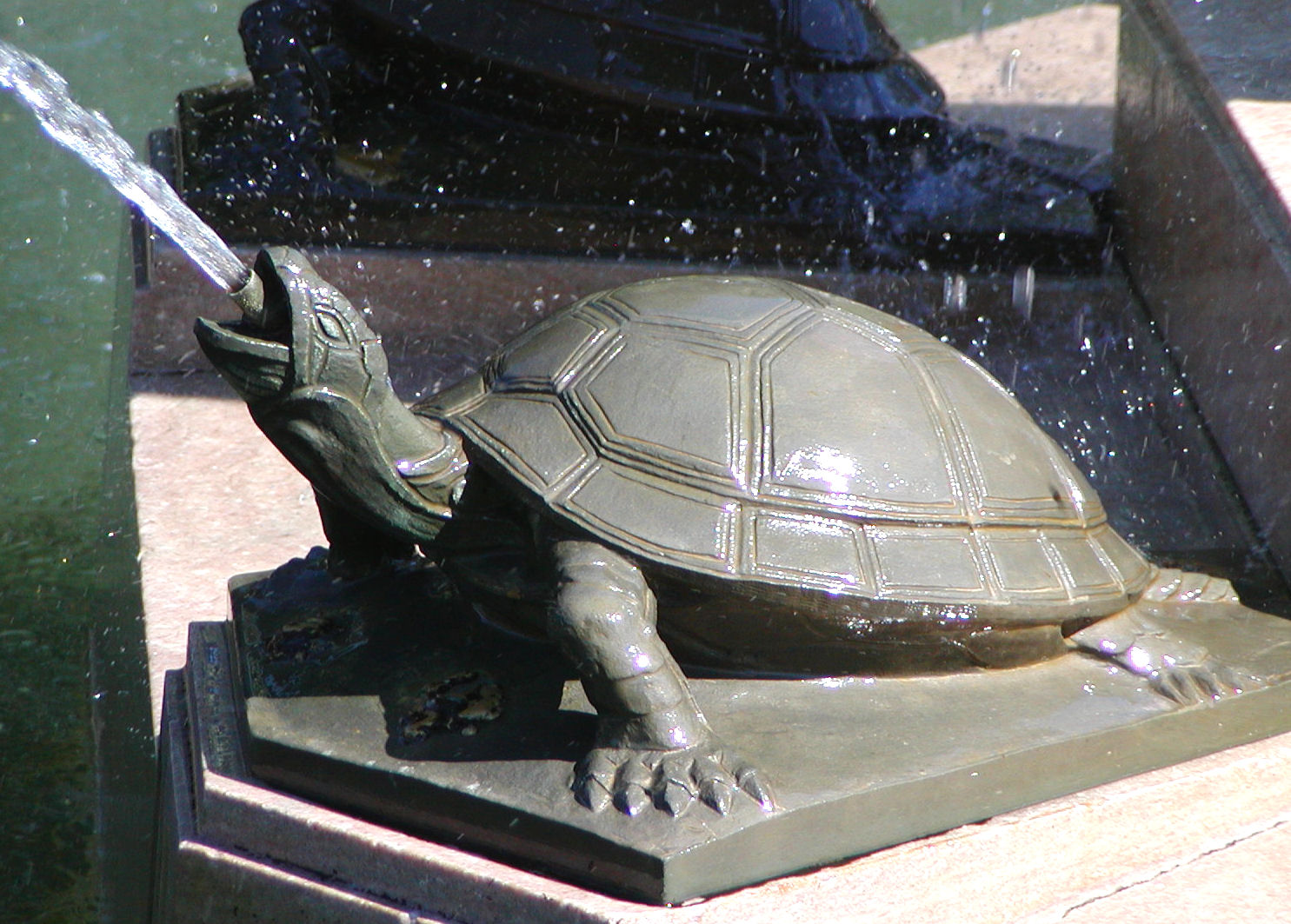
Phelps fountain

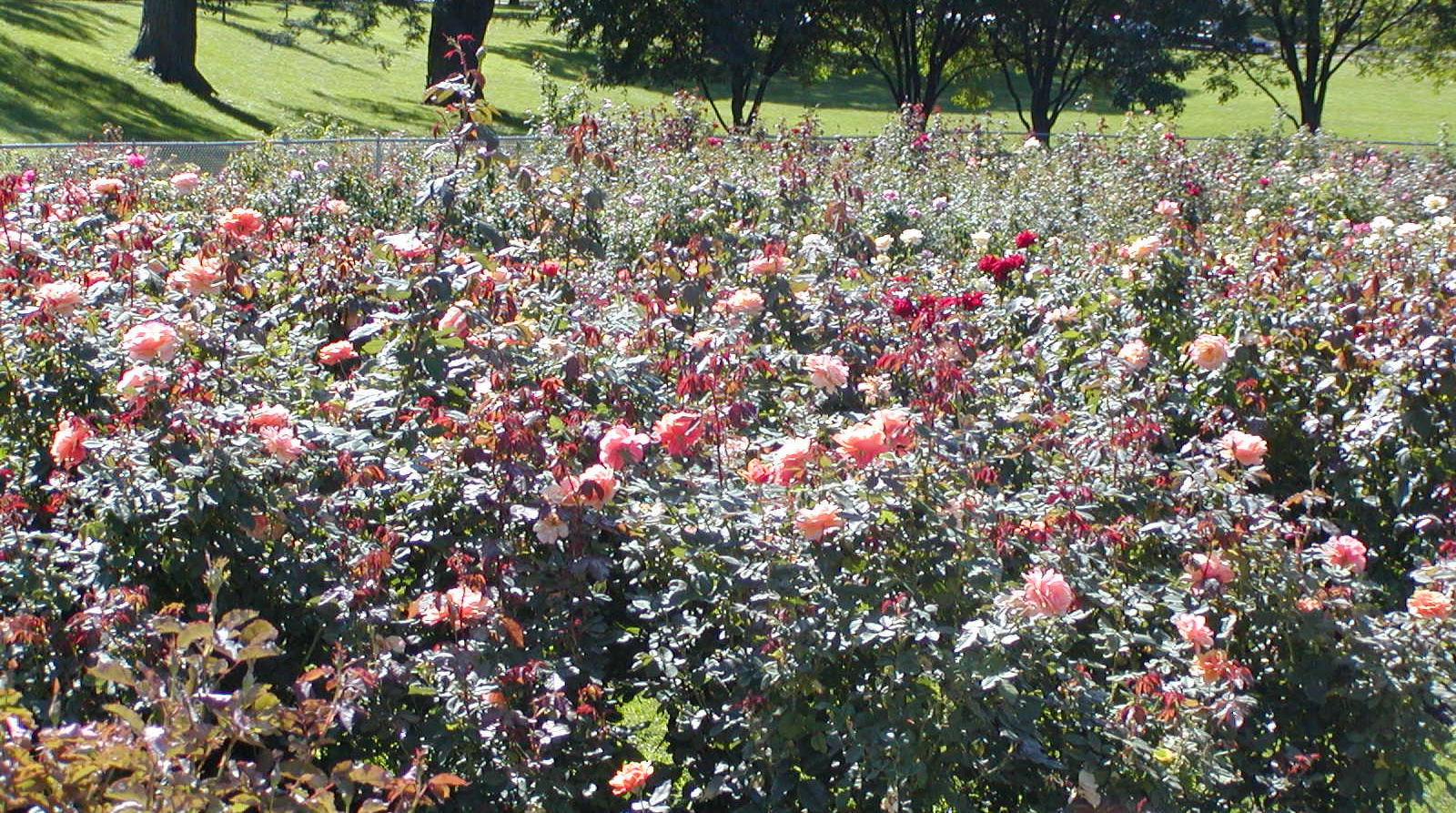
roses

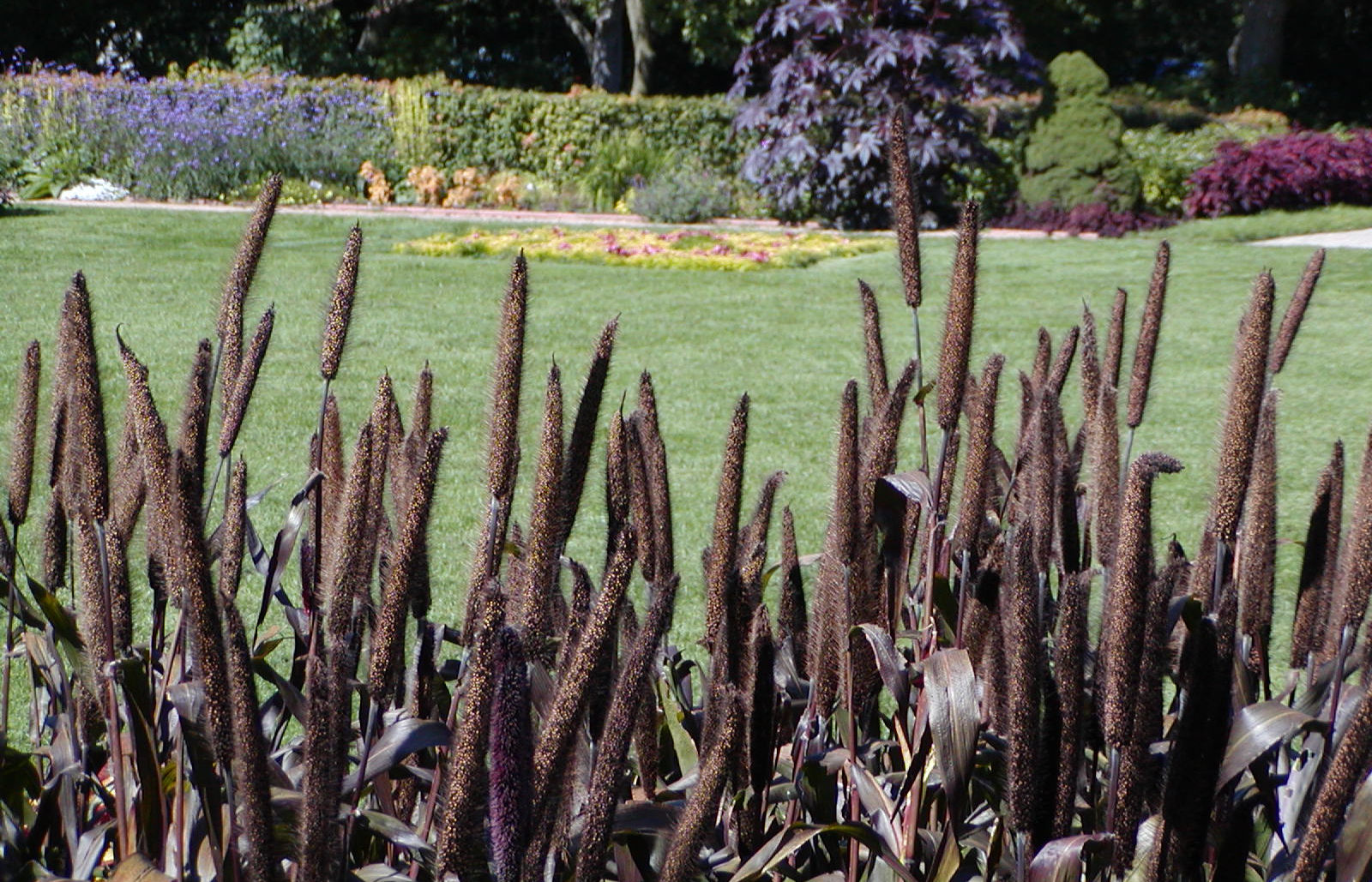
some of the plantings

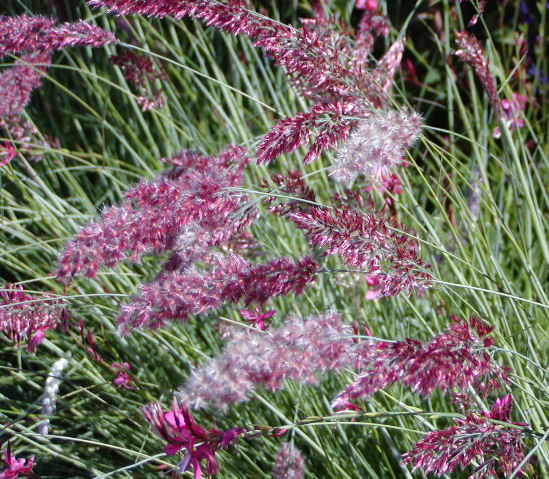
some of the plantings

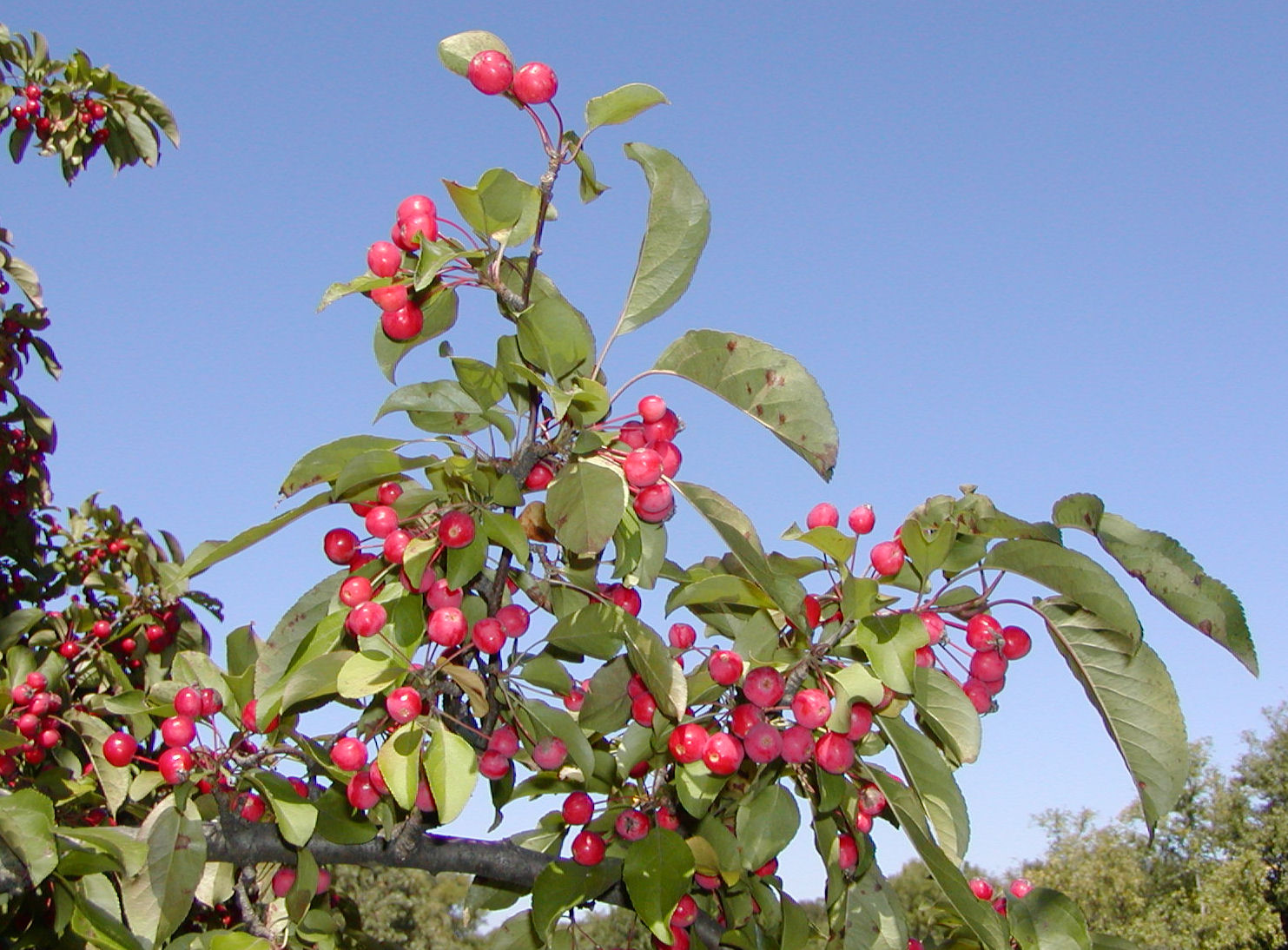
Crabapples in the autumn

North of the arboretum is the Peace Garden. In 1998 the rock garden was formally renamed the Lyndale Park Peace Garden.

"Lyndale Park - A Guide to the Peace Garden" (Document). Minneapolis Park and Recreation Board. 2006. pp. 1–8.

== Image gallery Peace Garden ==
plaque

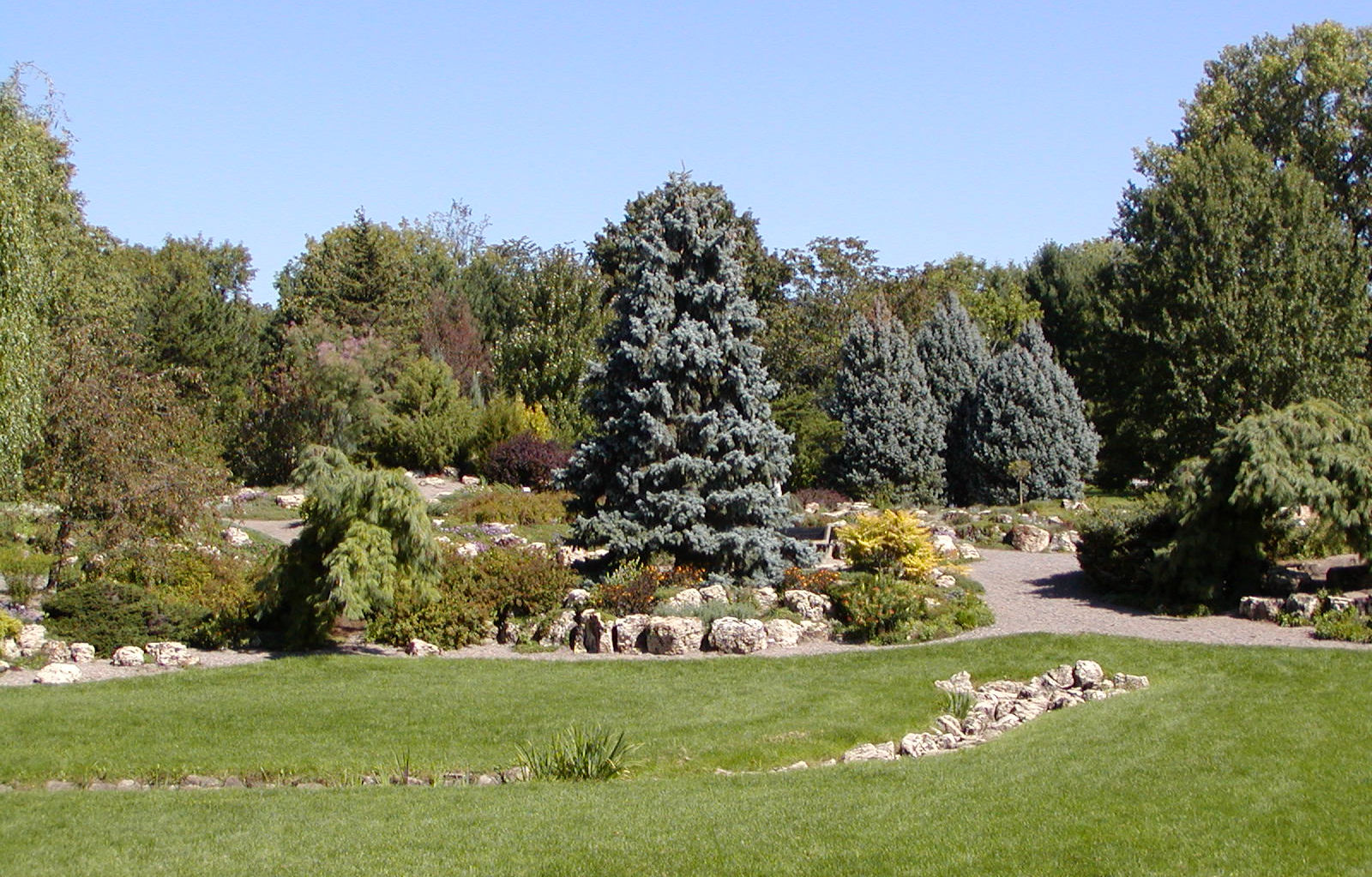

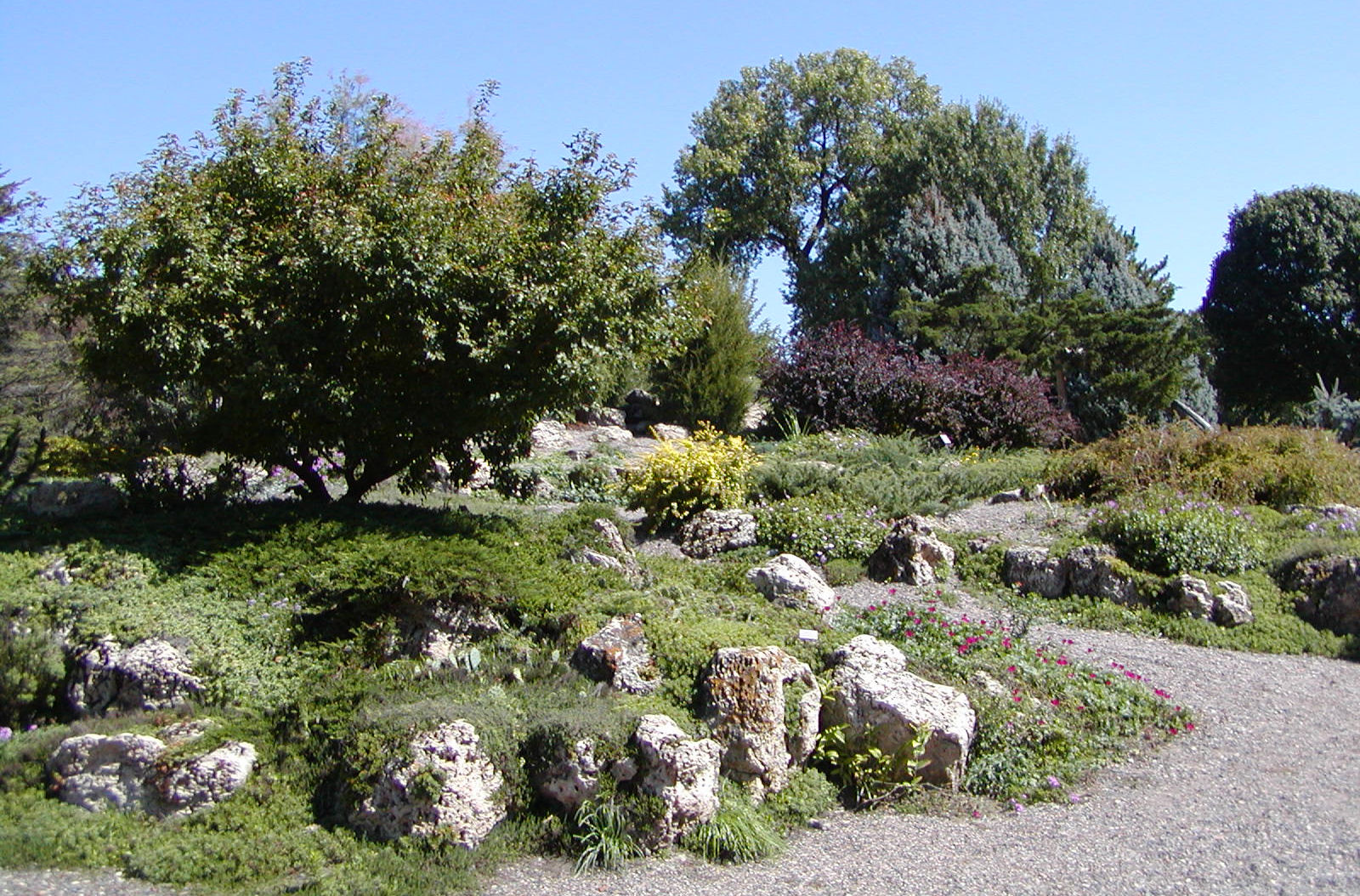

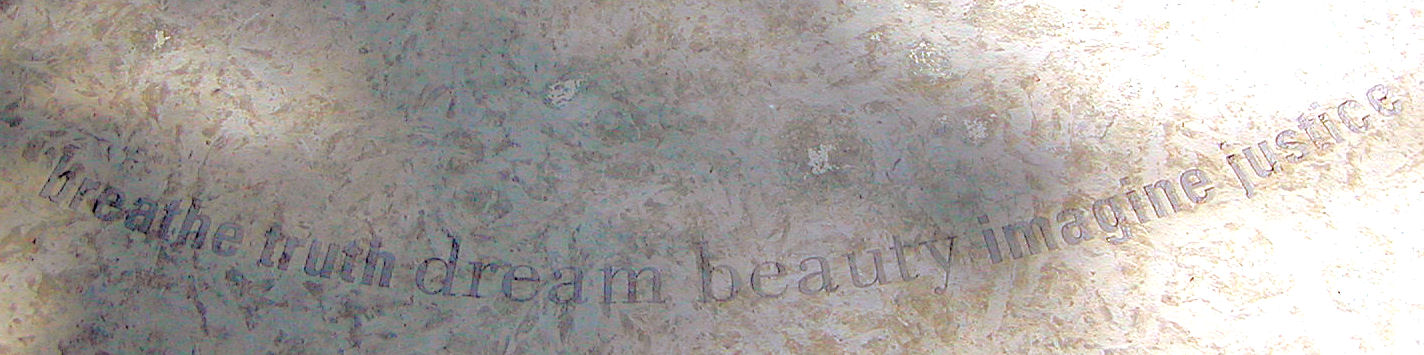
breathe truth dream beauty imagine justice

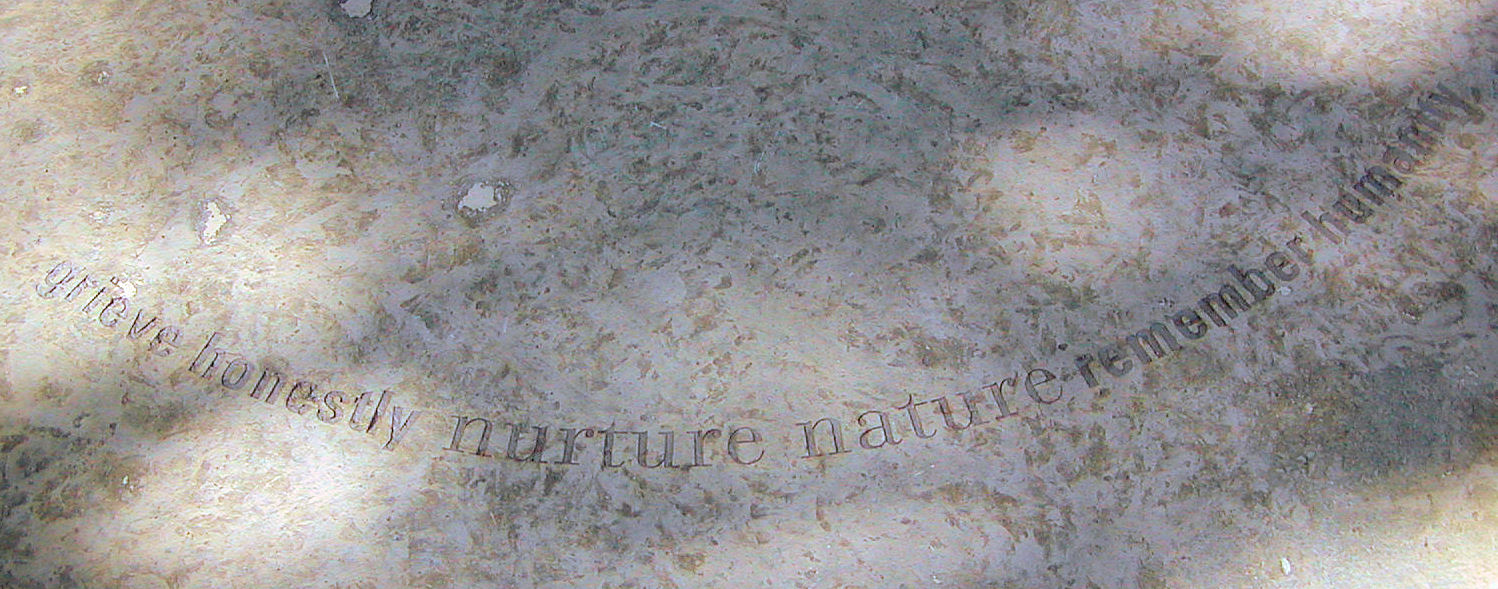
grieve honestly nurture nature remember humanity

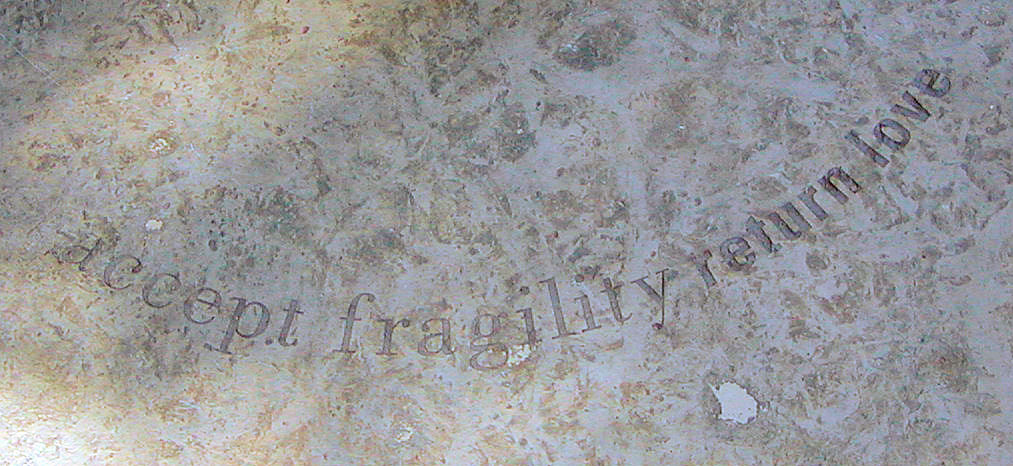
accept fragility return love

== See also ==
- Biography of Dr. Thomas Sadler Roberts
