= Theodore Wirth House–Administration Building =

Historic house in Minnesota, United States

- U.S. National Register of Historic Places
- Minneapolis Landmark
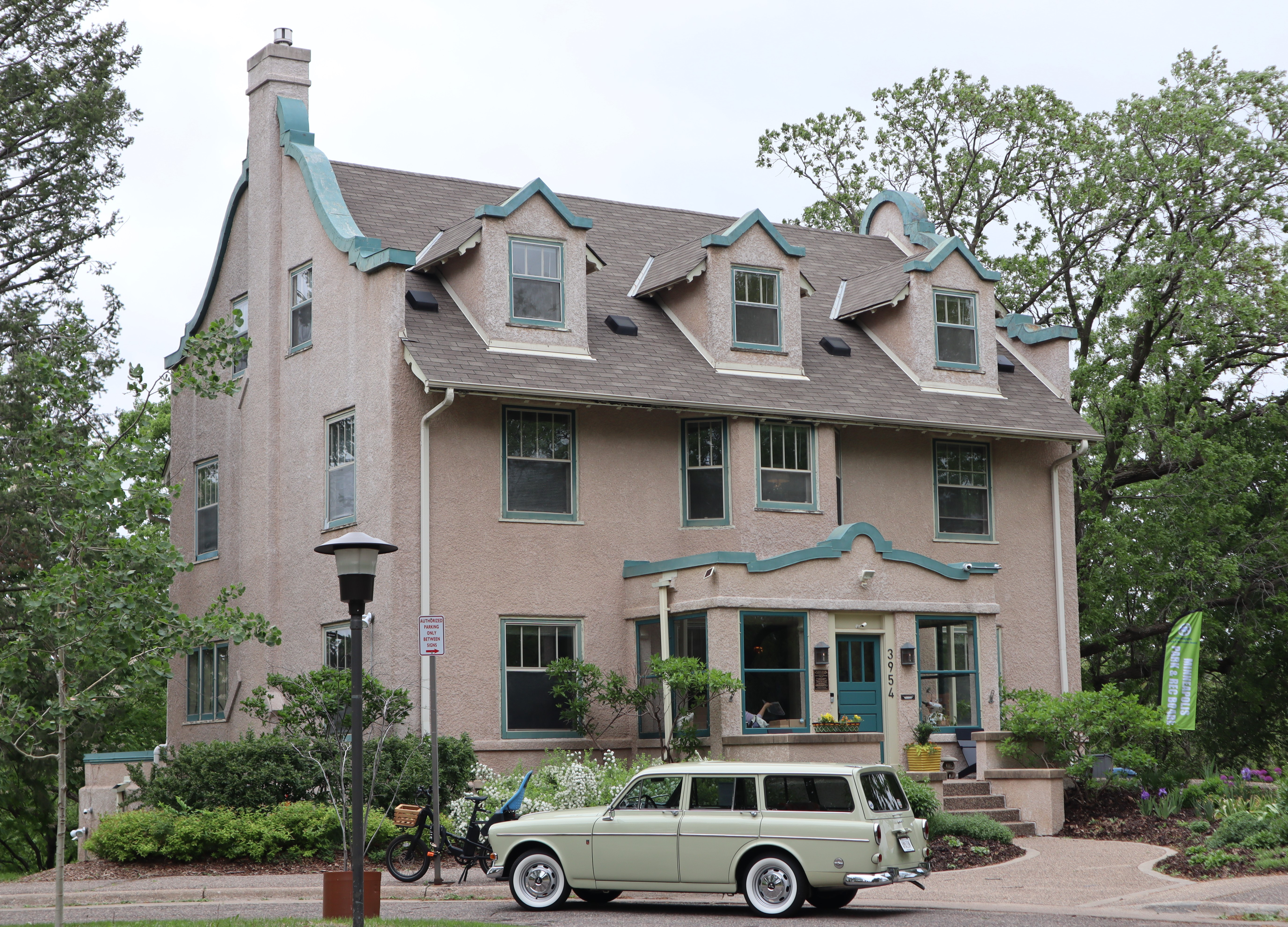
- The Wirth House from the southeast
- Location: 3954 Bryant Ave. S Minneapolis, Minnesota
- Coordinates: 44°55′52″N 93°17′30″W
- Area: 6 acres (2.4 ha)
- Built: 1910; 116 years ago
- Architect: Lowell A. Lamoreaux
- Architectural style: Colonial Revival, Mission Revival
- NRHP reference No.: 02000611

Significant dates
- Added to NRHP: June 7, 2002
- Designated MPLSL: 1998

The Theodore Wirth House is a house in Minneapolis, Minnesota, that was home to Theodore Wirth, an architect of the Minneapolis park system, and also served as the administration building for the park system. Wirth was superintendent of the Minneapolis Park and Recreation Board from 1906 through 1935, when he retired, and he continued to serve as superintendent emeritus until his death in 1949. The house was listed on the National Register of Historic Places in 2002. The house was recognized for Wirth's status as an international figure in the field of park design, for its role in bringing Wirth to Minneapolis, and for the work he did in the offices where he designed or redesigned the Minneapolis parks.

When Charles Loring originally approached Wirth to come to Minneapolis in 1905, Wirth was reluctant to accept the offer. His employer at the time, the city of Hartford, Connecticut, provided Wirth and his family a mansion in Elizabeth Park. Minneapolis did not have a home to provide, and as a civil servant, Wirth was unable to replace that benefit. During the process of negotiations, Loring agreed that the park board would build a home for Wirth. The home was to be located in Lyndale Farmstead Park. Wirth agreed to these terms and moved to Minneapolis in 1906. The house was designed by local architect Lowell Lamoreaux.
