= Lake Nokomis =

Lake in Minnesota, U.S.

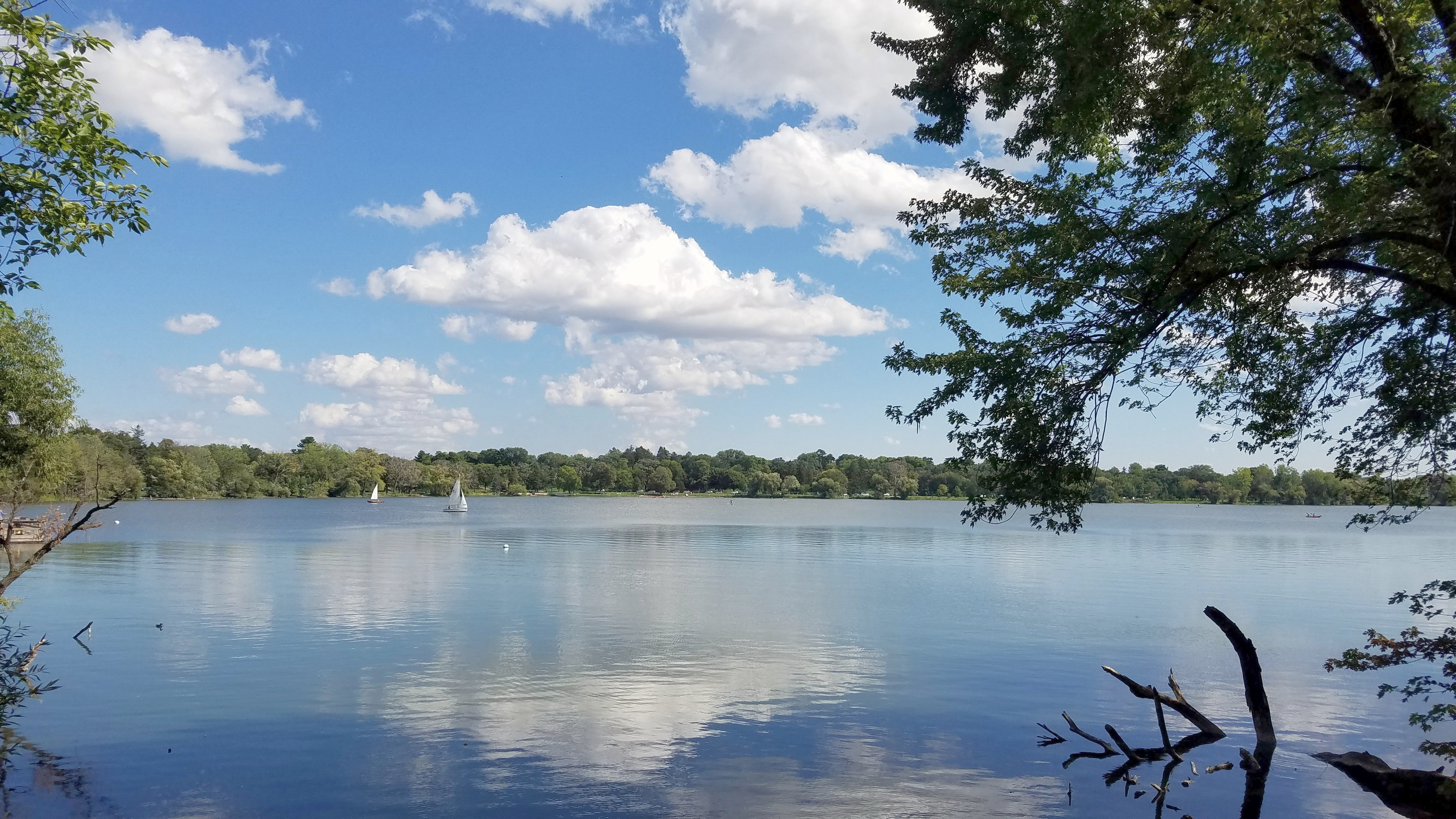
- Lake Nokomis, 2021

- Location within Minnesota Location within the United States

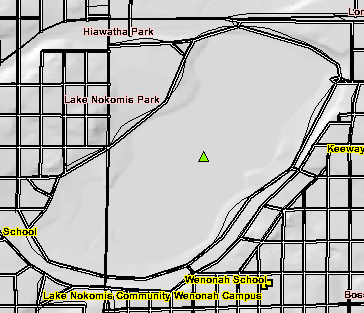
- USGS map
- Location: Minneapolis, Minnesota
- Coordinates: 44°54′34″N 93°14′32″W
- Basin countries: United States
- Surface area: 204 acres (83 ha)
- Max. depth: 33 ft (10 m)
- Surface elevation: 814 ft (248 m)
- Frozen: Winter

Lake Nokomis is one of several lakes in Minneapolis, Minnesota, and part of the city's Chain of Lakes. In 1819, Captain George Gooding named it Lake Amelia in honor of his daughter. In 1910 it was renamed after Nokomis, the fictional grandmother of Hiawatha. It is located in the southern part of the city, west of the Mississippi River and south of Lake Hiawatha. The lake is oval in shape, with a long axis running southwest to northeast. Two pathways circle the lake, a 2.7-mile (4.3 km) pedestrian trail and a 2.8-mile (4.5 km) bicycle trail. Because the lower part of the lake is crossed by Cedar Avenue running north–south, the impression from the ground is that the lake is shaped like an L. The lake has an area of 204 acres (0.83 km^{2}).

== History ==
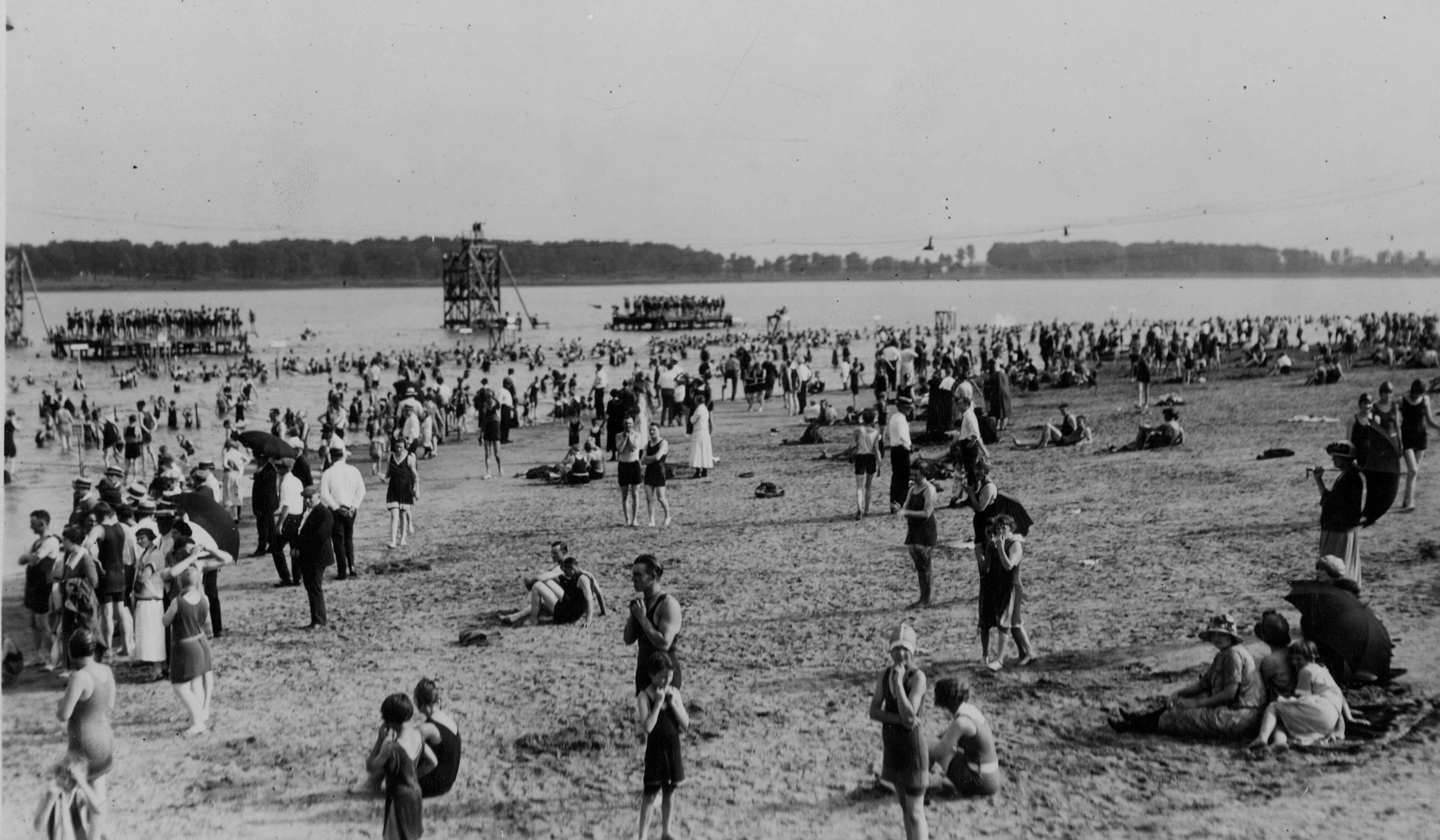
Bathing beach at Lake Nokomis 1924

When purchased in 1907 by the Minneapolis Park and Recreation Board, the lake was very shallow, only 5 feet (1.5 m) deep in the deepest spot. Much of it was actually marshland or slough—a drainage area for the neighborhood. It was deepened by dredging to produce the current lake. Within years of its development, Lake Nokomis surpassed Bde Maka Ska as the most popular swimming beach on Minneapolis city lakes; in 1924 attendance at the Lake Nokomis bathhouse was nearly triple the attendance at the Bde Maka Ska bath house.

In 1940, Dr. Chris Lambertsen performed about 12 Scuba dives in his Lambertsen Amphibious Respiratory Unit (LARU) prototype in Lake Nokomis. The LARU was the first rebreather designed and built in the United States and these dives are the first closed-circuit oxygen dives in U.S. history. On one of these dives, Lambertsen experienced an episode of oxygen toxicity but managed to surface without assistance.

Lake Nokomis has recently undergone a preservation project, creating areas of native vegetation along its shores. Several artificial ponds have been added to a more practical degree, as the areas where they are now were almost always flooded.

The local population uses the lake for a variety of purposes. Fishing and sailing are popular, there are two beaches with good (imported) sand, and the surrounding large park has facilities for walking and running, softball, cycling, and other sports.

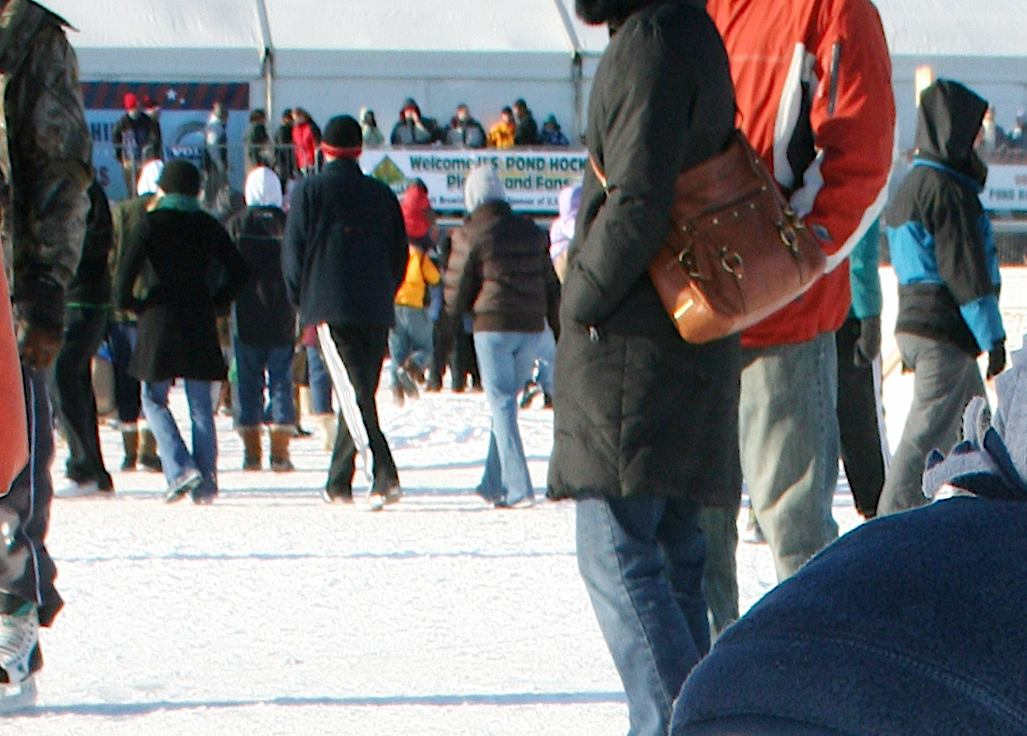
Frozen in winter, Lake Nokomis is the site of the U.S. pond hockey championships

The main beach along the northwest side has a restaurant, concessions, restrooms, and a variety of rental equipment, along with a playground. The smaller beach on the northeast side has no concessions but does have portable toilets. The lake bed drops off suddenly beyond the designated swimming areas, prompting a surprising and potentially dangerous environment for anyone swimming outside the ropes. This was cited as a contributing factor in the drowning death of an area teen in July 2006 at the beach.

Lake Nokomis has been the site of one of the more distinctive activities in the Minneapolis Aquatennial celebration, the "Milk Carton Boat Race," from 1983 to 2000, although that event was relocated back to Bde Maka Ska in 2001. It is also home to the Life Time Fitness triathlon each July, and numerous other races on summer weekends.

Up until 1998, the lake was noted for having a number of very large and old trees which spanned several feet in diameter along the east shore, but these were uprooted in 1998 when a severe storm with high winds moved through the area.

Since 2007 the United States pond hockey championships take place every winter on Lake Nokomis.

== Fish ==
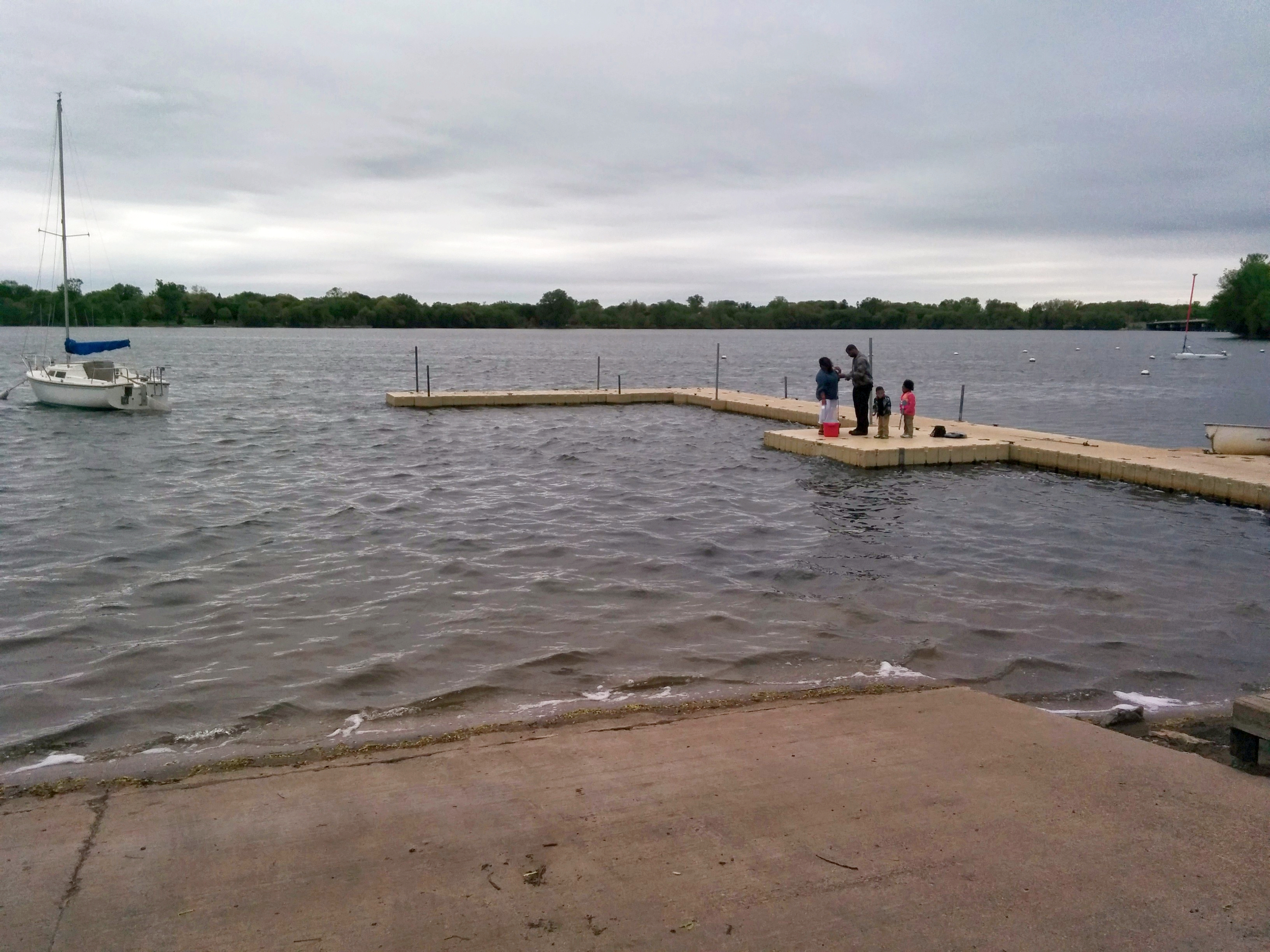
Boat launch and pier at Lake Nokomis

The lake contains black bullhead, black crappie, bluegill, bowfin, largemouth bass, carp, golden shiner, hybrid sunfish, pumpkinseed, tiger muskellunge, walleye, white sucker, yellow bullhead, and yellow perch. Some fish consumption guideline restrictions have been placed on the lake's walleye and white sucker due to mercury contamination.

== See also ==
- List of lakes in Minneapolis
- List of shared-use paths in Minneapolis
