= Charles M. Loring =

American businessperson, miller and publicist

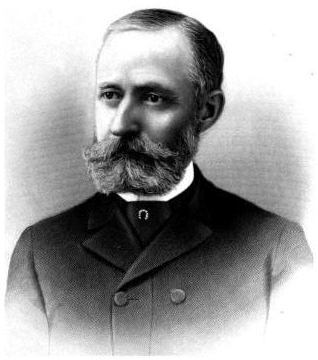
- Born: Charles Morgridge Loring; November 13, 1833; Portland, Maine, U.S.
- Died: March 18, 1922 (aged 88); Minneapolis, Minnesota, U.S.
- Resting place: Lakewood Cemetery
- Occupations: Businessperson, miller, park commissioner, grain trader

Charles Morgridge Loring (November 13, 1833 – March 18, 1922) was an American businessman, miller and publicist. Raised in Maine to be a sea captain, Loring instead became a civic leader in Minneapolis, Minnesota where he was a wealthy flour miller and in Riverside, California where he helped to build the first city hall. He was a popular and generous man who enjoyed many friendships and business associations.

Loring is remembered as the influential commissioner and president of the first Minneapolis park board. Considered the "Father of the Park System" in Minneapolis, Loring encouraged the city to work with Horace Cleveland, one of the first landscape architects, and park superintendents William W. Berry and Theodore Wirth. The city built what has been called, "the best-located, best-financed, best-designed, and best-maintained public open space in America."

== Family and early life ==
Loring's grandfather was a respected teacher in Portland, Maine known as Master Loring, a descendant of one of the earliest settlers of Hingham, Massachusetts. Charles himself was a fifth great grandson of Hingham immigrant Deacon Thomas Loring. His mother was Sarah Wiley, a relative of Parson Wiley, a noted clergyman. His father Captain Horace Loring, a seaman who once visited the West Indies, took the young Loring on voyages as far from home as Cuba to prepare him for a life as a sea captain. But Loring disliked the ocean and the isolation and moved to Chicago in 1856 where he worked as a wheat speculator for B. P. Hutchinson and became a successful grain trader.

Loring never enjoyed perfect health, and when he fell ill in Chicago and moved on doctor's advice to Minneapolis, his friend Loren Fletcher helped him become manager of the supply store for Dorilus Morrison's lumber business. Loring and Emily S. Crosman married in 1855. They had one daughter, Eva Maria, and one son, Albert C. Loring who managed businesses for his father. Emily Loring died on March 13, 1894. Loring remarried on November 28, 1895, to Florence Barton, daughter of A. B. Barton of Minneapolis.

Florence Loring participated in civic affairs and was a quilter whose Crazy Quilt is in the collection of the Minneapolis Institute of Arts. The Lorings constructed the Florence Barton Loring Shelter in 1906 to protect children, lost animals and the city's draft horses. Known at different times as the Minneapolis Humane Society, the Animal Rescue League, and the Animal Humane Society of Hennepin County, today's Animal Humane Society (AHS) was located there near Loring Park for 40 years. Florence Loring also built a home for nurses near the hospital in Riverside, California where the Lorings lived in winter.

== Flour milling ==
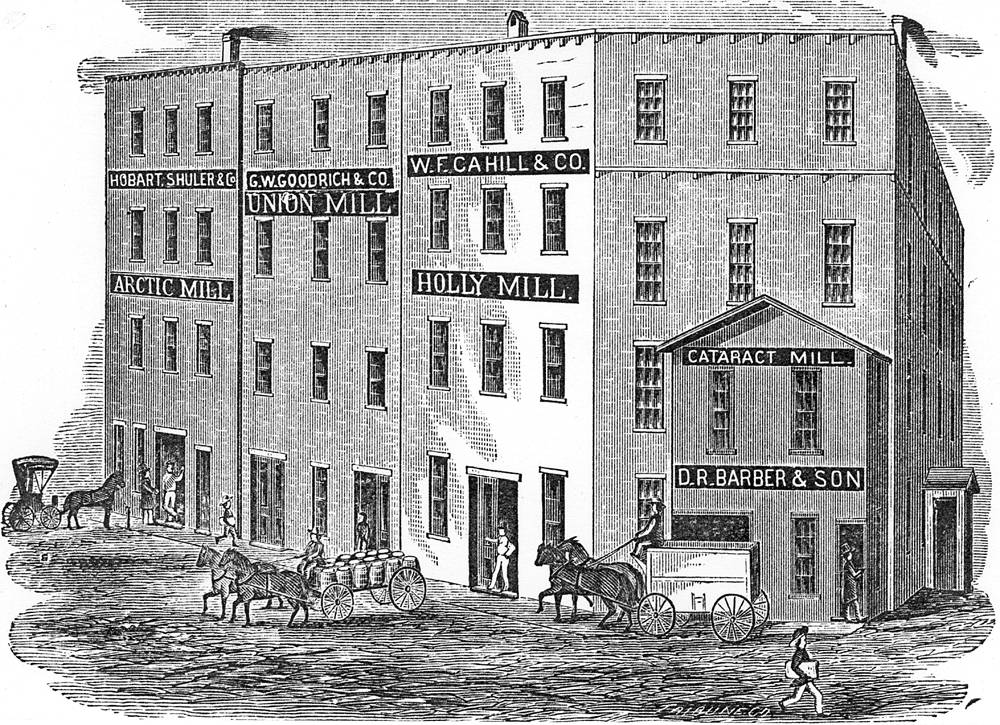
Flour leaving the Holly Mill, 1870s

Minneapolis was founded at Saint Anthony Falls, the only waterfall on the Mississippi River, because of the potential for energy created by falling, flowing water. Loring understood the city's geography—its waterfalls, lakes and river banks—and was able to use these unique aspects of his new home to slowly build his fortune.

In 1861, Loring joined Fletcher in L. Fletcher & Co., a general store specializing in supplies for lumbermen on Nicollet Avenue across from Minneapolis City Hall where they prospered for fifteen years. They joined with W. F. Cahill to convert the municipal waterworks building into a flour mill run on hydropower, the smallest in the Mississippi west bank milling district. With George Hineline they added three limestone stories and operated it as the W. F. Cahill & Co. Holly mill. During this period, Loring served in the city government, first as road supervisor and in 1872 as a Minneapolis City Council member from the Fifth Ward in the Near North community.

The group sold the Holly mill in 1872 to W. H. and F. S. Hinkle and purchased the Galaxy mill from W. P. Ankeny. In 1873 Fletcher and Loring also became principal owners of the Minnetonka Mills Company near Lake Minnetonka, in production between 1881 and 1886. Loring supervised his milling interests until 1880, when his son A. C. Loring took responsibility for their management. The Northwestern Consolidated Milling Company led by John Martin purchased the Galaxy mill and beginning in 1891 operated nine mills in Minneapolis. By the early 1900s and until the Great Depression, Washburn-Crosby which became General Mills, Pillsbury-Washburn, and Northwestern which became part of Standard Milling Company were an oligopoly, holding 97% of the Minneapolis flour market.

== Electricity and rail ==
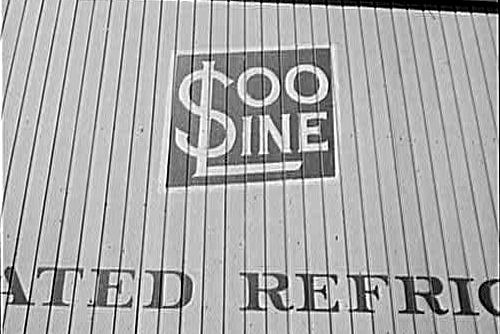
Today the Soo Line is part of the Canadian Pacific Railway.

Through his business associations, Loring contributed to major advances in the infrastructure of Minneapolis, to supply electricity, as a director of a railroad, and as chief executive of the North American Telegraph Company. In 1881 with William D. Washburn, Joel Bean Bassett, Sumner W. Farnham, James A. Lovejoy and Otis Arkwright Pray, Fletcher and Loring co-founded the Minnesota Electric Light and Electric Motive Power Company, later the Minnesota Brush Electric Company. The group ran lines to bars and businesses on Washington Avenue and supplied them from the first hydroelectric central power plant in the U.S., thirteen years before the Niagara Falls plant went on line in 1894. In 1883 with Washburn, Martin, H. T. Welles, Thomas Lowry, George R. Newell, Anthony Kelly, Clinton Morrison, J. K. Sidle, W. W. Eastman, William D. Hale, Charles A. Pillsbury and Charles J. Martin, Loring incorporated the Minneapolis Sault Ste. Marie & Atlantic Railway Company known as the Soo Line Railroad.

== Other associations ==
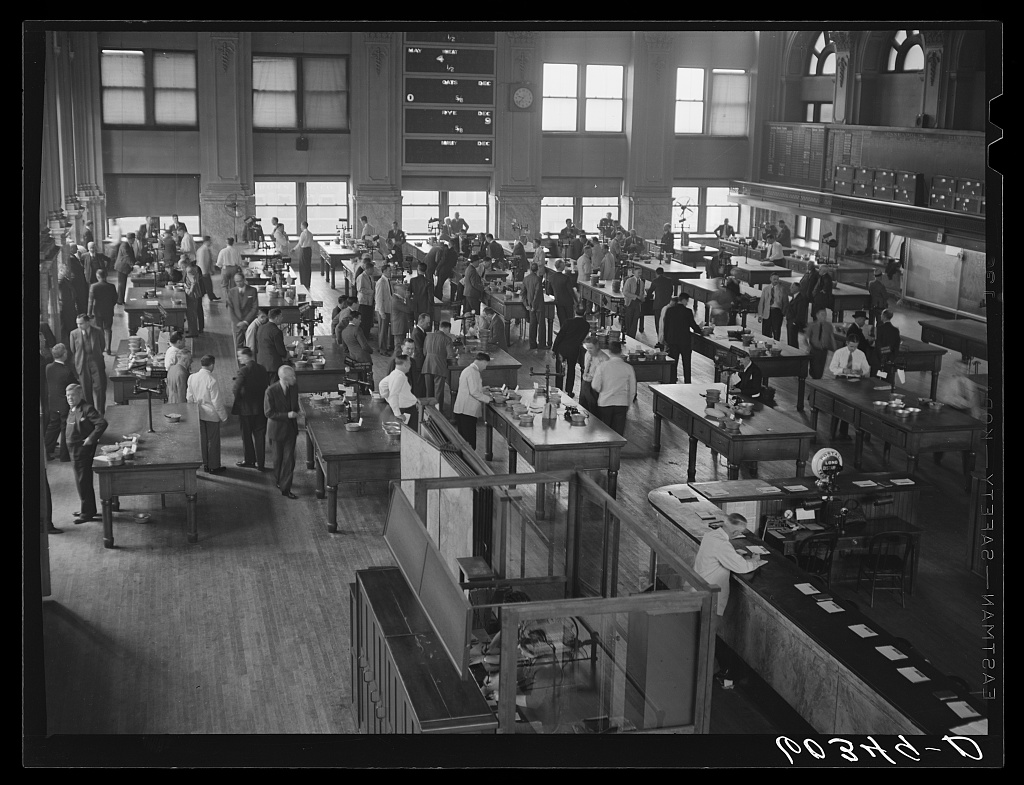
Minneapolis Grain Exchange

Loring also owned real estate and was a director of Syndicate Insurance Co., the Minnesota Title Insurance Co. and the Minnesota Loan and Trust Co. which eventually became part of today's Wells Fargo. The first Minnesota Flower Show was held July 4, 1863 and was organized by Loring who was a member of the Minnesota Horticultural Society. He co-founded the Minnesota Homœopathic Medical College which opened in 1886. Loring acted as president of the Minneapolis Board of Trade in 1875 and from 1886 to 1890 served as president of the Minneapolis Chamber of Commerce, renamed the Minneapolis Grain Exchange.

Loring cofounded the Morgan Machine Co. in Rochester, New York. He served as president of the Minnesota Forestry Association, the National Park and Outdoor Association, the Lakewood Cemetery Association, and the Sons of Maine and as vice president of the National Board of Trade.

== Park board ==
Despite opposition from the Knights of Labor who eventually became supporters, on January 23, 1883, the Minneapolis Board of Trade passed resolutions to secure legislation to create a Board of Park Commissioners, and the city ratified a Park Act on April 3, 1883. Loring was the natural choice and was appointed the commission's first president. He was reelected each term and served until 1890 when he insisted on resigning because a property in which he held financial interest was under park board consideration.

=== Horace Cleveland ===
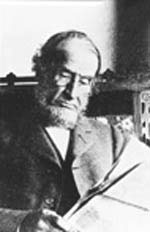
Horace Cleveland

Horace Cleveland made his "crowning achievement" in Minneapolis at the end of his career, in part thanks to "kindred spirits." William Watts Folwell who was the founding president of the University of Minnesota, and Berry and Loring, both from Maine, were all united in their love for nature. The system Cleveland created is characterized by the use of indigenous plants in their natural environment and by the linking of open spaces and landmarks across distance with boulevards and parkways. Cleveland had thought about linked public open spaces as early as 1855.

During Loring's tenure, Cleveland designed the Grand Rounds Scenic Byway and the Chain of Lakes. In his history of the Minneapolis park system, Loring describes how green space was preserved around every Minneapolis lake. Many donations and acquisitions of property came early enough that the land was affordable. In 1872 for example, the city thought William S. King's price of $50,000 was too high for the 250 acres (1.0 km^{2}) of land around Lake Harriet. Thirty years later it would have sold for $2,000,000.

=== Minnehaha Park ===
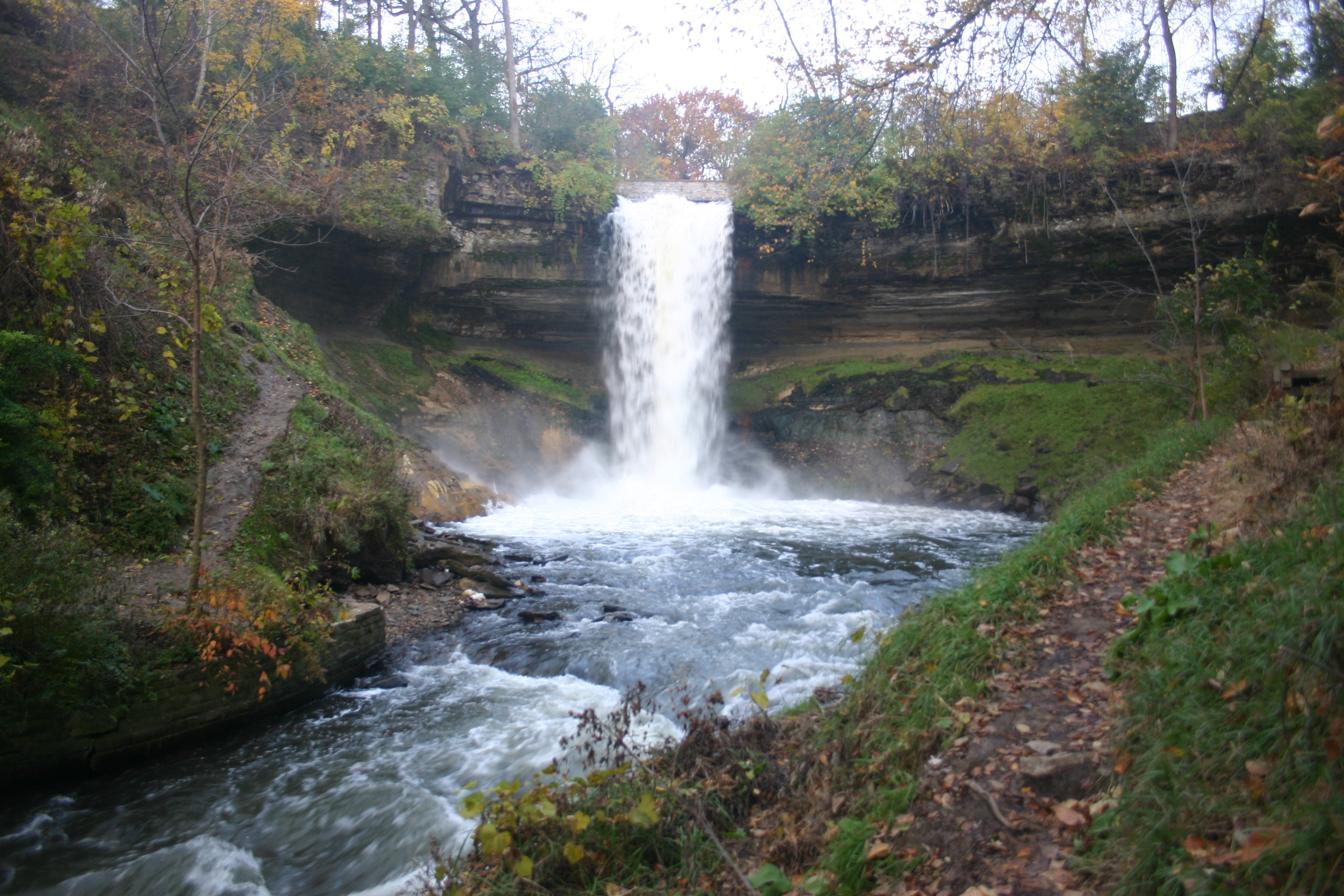
Loring called the 123 acres (0.50 km^{2}) around Minnehaha Falls the park board's most important acquisition.

Minnehaha Falls received pilgrimages from fans of Longfellow's The Song of Hiawatha by the 1870s. At the same time, business people wanted to harness its power. In 1884 Loring advocated a Minnesota state park at Minnehaha Falls, a goal the state tried and failed to achieve. In 1888, Cleveland presented The Aesthetic Development of the United Cities of St. Paul and Minneapolis at the Minneapolis Society of Fine Arts and convinced the city to preserve the waterfall and to build a city park there. In the 1890s, Cleveland's Minnehaha Park was annexed to Minneapolis and completed the Grand Rounds. Today Minnehaha Park sees 850,000 visitors each year. Named by Folwell, the 52-mile (83 km) Grand Rounds circles from Northeast, Minneapolis to Theodore Wirth Park, to the Chain of Lakes and follows the Mississippi River upstream past Minnehaha Falls to downtown.

=== Theodore Wirth ===
At the 1889 meeting of the American Park and Outdoor Art Association, held in Minneapolis, Loring read Cleveland's The Influence of Parks on the Character of Children. In 1905 Loring learned of Theodore Wirth and recruited him as park superintendent. Wirth met with Minneapolis neighborhoods to extend Cleveland's work from landmark geographical features to every street. He wrapped "sixty miles of picturesque parkways around the City like an emerald ribbon." Wirth planned a playground within the reach of most children and canopies of trees throughout the city. Each home is within six blocks of a park and as of the U.S. Census in 2000, there are 770 square feet (72 m^{2}) of parkland for each resident.

Minneapolis park assets as of 2004 included the following. 144 of the parks were in place when Wirth retired in 1935.

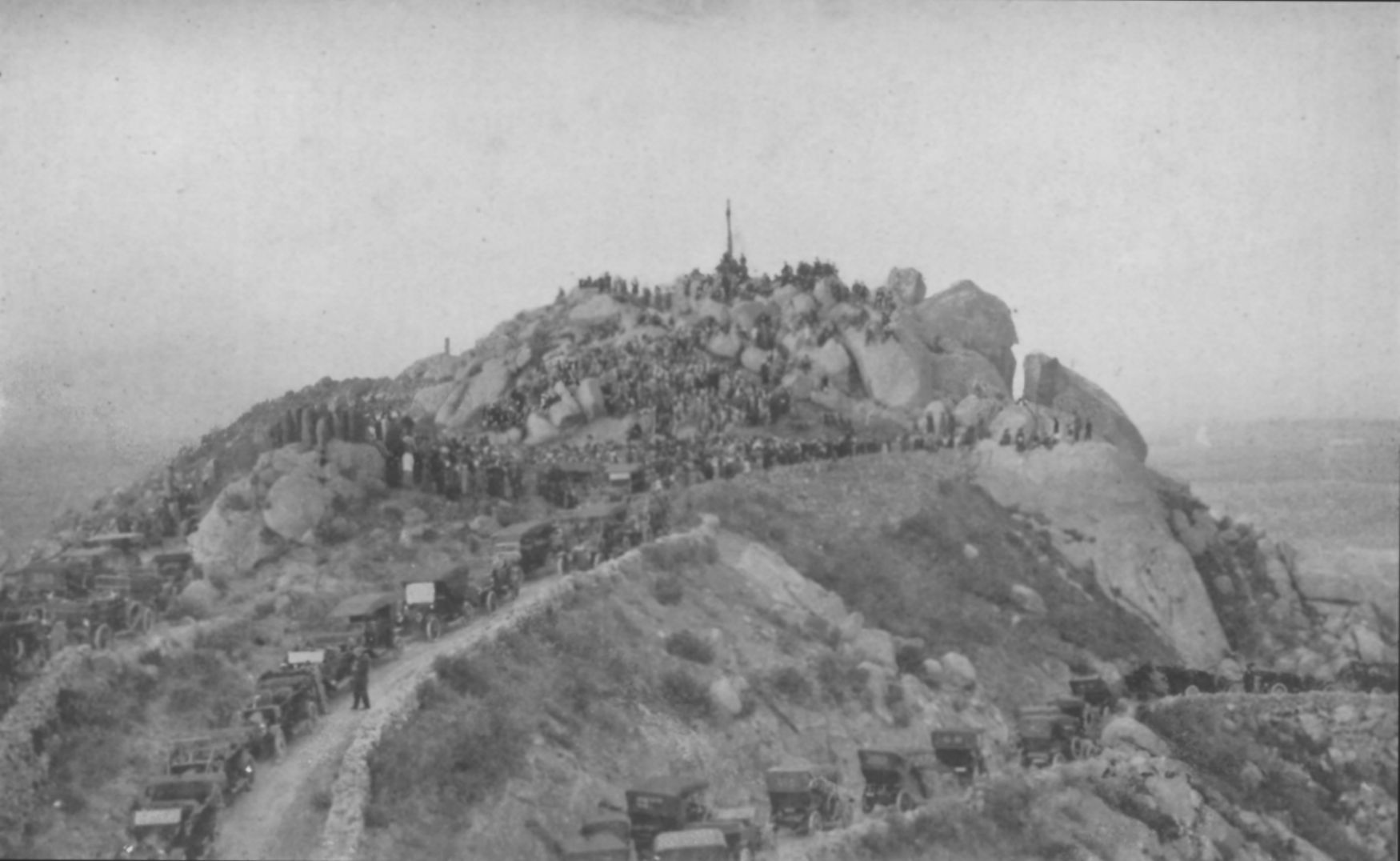
Loring Rock on Mount Rubidoux was dedicated in 1922.

- 170 parks
- 17 lakes (24 in city)
- 12 gardens
- 3 outdoor pools
- 62 wading pools
- 49 recreation centers
- 10 supervised beaches
- 2 waterparks
- 7 golf courses
- 34 skating rinks
- 55 miles (89 km) of parkway
- 43 miles (69 km) of bicycle trails
- 43 miles (69 km) of walking trails
- 4 dog parks
- 183 tennis courts

== City of Riverside ==
In 1889 in his winter home in Riverside, California, Loring constructed an office block with a 1,000-seat theater on the first floor that hosted performers such as W.C. Fields and Sarah Bernhardt. At various times known as the Loring Opera House, Loring Theatre, Fox Riverside, and Golden State Theatre, the theater was destroyed by fire in 1990. The office building was leased to the city for use as its first City Hall, library, jail and municipal courts.

== Legacies ==
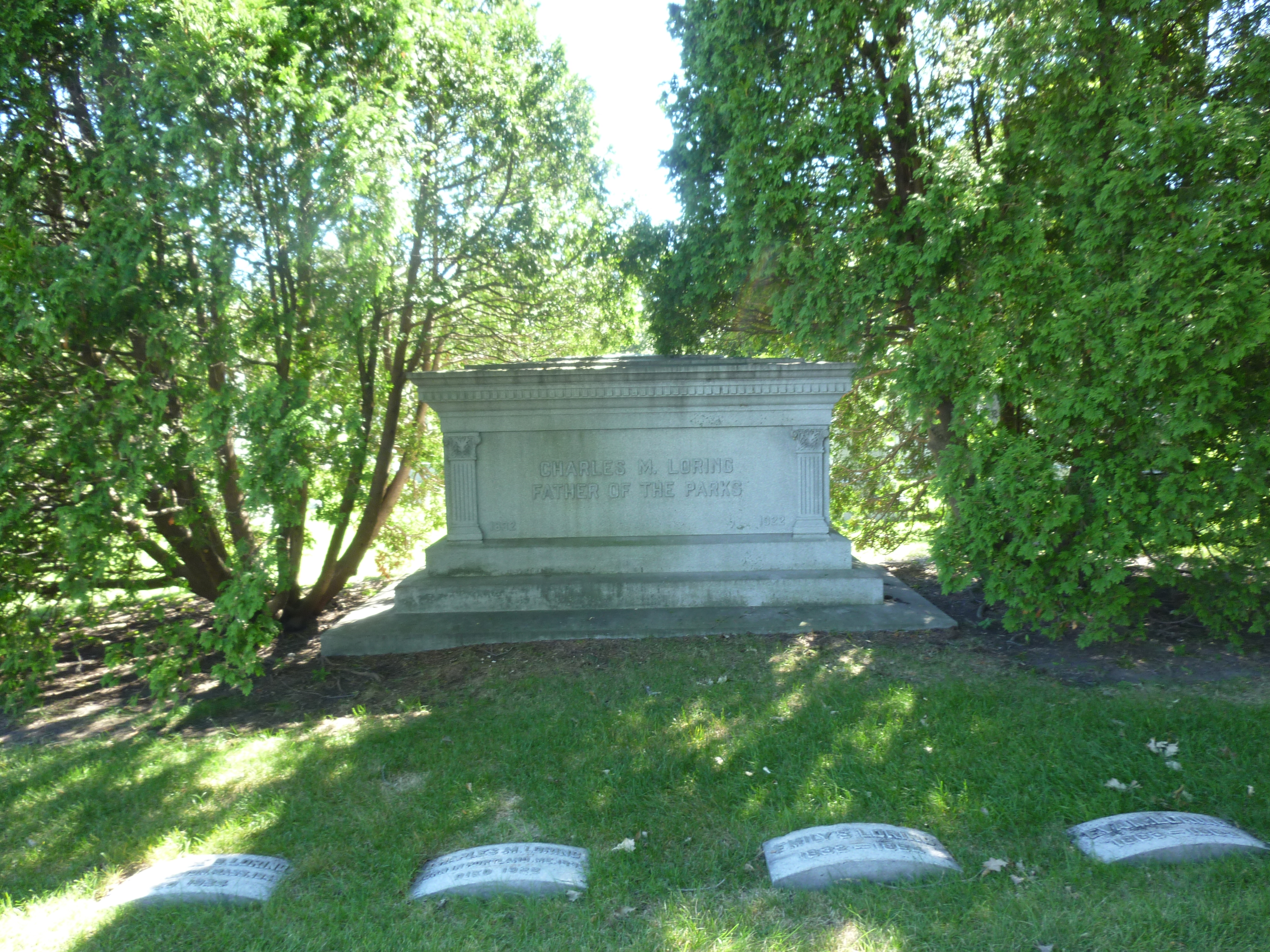
Loring's monument in Lakewood Cemetery in Minneapolis

Formerly Central Park, Loring Park in the Central community is 35 acres (14 ha) designed by Cleveland on the site of the Joseph Johnson farm. It was dedicated May 5, 1883 and renamed for Loring in or near his final year as park board president. Loring Lake, formerly Johnson Lake, was also named for Loring as is the Loring Stage House, originally Loring's office.

In California, Loring Drive in Huntington Park and Loring's building in Riverside bore his name. In Minneapolis, the Loring Elementary School in the Camden community, the Loring Nicollet Alternative School in the Stevens Square neighborhood, the Loring Pasta Bar in Dinkytown as well as other businesses carry his name. The Minneapolis Park & Recreation Board's Charles M. Loring Award is named in his memory. The Camp Fire Girls planted a spruce tree in his memory on the south shore of Lake Harriet.

Loring died at his home in Minneapolis at the age of 88. He is buried in Lakewood Cemetery which he helped to create near Bde Maka Ska in Minneapolis. The City of Riverside declared April 17, 1923 Loring Day and dedicated a plaque to him, inscribed with this memorial:

In honor of
Charles M. Loring
Treelover
And
Civic Enthusiast

Let dead names be eternalized by dead stones
Let living names by living shafts be known:
Plant thou a tree whose griefless leaves shall sing
Thy deed and thee, each fresh unfolding spring

== See also ==
- History of Minneapolis, Minnesota
