= Brownie Lake =

Lake in Minnesota

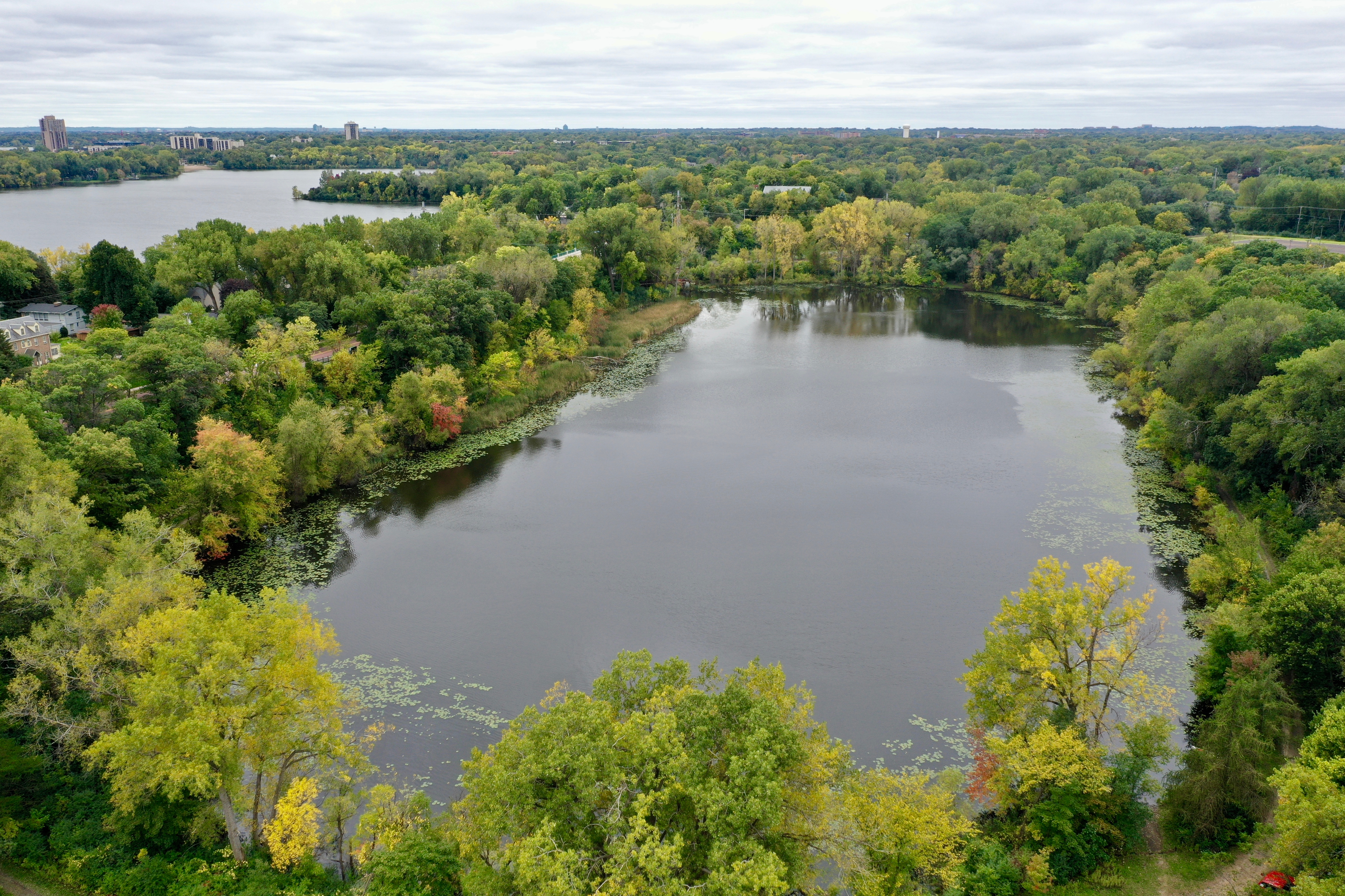
- The view looking south over Brownie Lake, with Cedar Lake in the background in October 2019
- Interactive map of Brownie Lake
- Location: Minneapolis, Minnesota, US
- Coordinates: 44°58′03″N 93°19′28″W
- Managing agency: Minneapolis Park and Recreation Board
- Surface area: 18 acres (0.073 km^{2})
- Average depth: 20.3 feet (6.2 m)
- Max. depth: 49.9 feet (15.2 m)

Brownie Lake is a lake in Hennepin County, Minnesota, and within the city limits of Minneapolis. It is the northernmost lake in the Minneapolis Chain of Lakes (Brownie Lake, Cedar Lake, Lake of the Isles, Bde Maka Ska, and Lake Harriet). It is within Brownie Lake Park, and administered by the Minneapolis Park and Recreation Board (MPRB).

== Hydrology ==
Brownie Lake is a meromictic lake, which means there are two layers of water in the lake with differing physical and chemical conditions, and which do not intermix in spring and fall as occurs in most lakes in the northern temperate zone. It is one of two meromictic bodies of water in Minneapolis, the other being Spring Lake. A chemocline separates the top layer of the lake, which contains dissolved oxygen, from the bottom layer, which is anoxic. There are no natural inflows to Brownie Lake, but it receives storm sewer runoff from six locations around the lake. Water flows out through a canal connecting Brownie to Cedar Lake, which is hydrologically connected to Lake of the Isles and Bde Maka Ska. Brownie Lake is part of the Minnehaha Creek Watershed District.

A distinguishing feature of Brownie Lake is the high concentrations of dissolved iron (Fe), which have historically been between 1 and 2 mmol/L in the bottom part of the lake, and still exceed 1 mmol/L today. From 1950 until the 1990s, an industrial cooling outlet from what was the Prudential Office Building with average total iron concentrations of 7 μmol/L was discharged into Brownie Lake at a rate of 50,000 gallons per day. Therefore, surface concentrations of dissolved iron were higher in the 1970s (~ 2 μmol/L) than they are today (< 1 μmol/L).

Total phosphate concentrations in Brownie Lake can reach 46 μmol/L. In 2014, Brownie had total phosphorus levels considered eutrophic by the Minnesota Pollution Control Agency (MPCA). Because it is meromictic with abundant dissolved iron, phosphate can be shuttled out of surface waters through adsorption onto iron oxide minerals that form at the chemocline, which then sink and dissolve, releasing phosphate. Some of the phosphate inputs are likely anthropogenic. A pumping station was created in 1957 to pump water from Bassett Creek into Brownie Lake in order to maintain the desired water levels in the Chain of Lakes. In 1966, water from the Mississippi River was pumped into Bassett Creek, which then entered Brownie. Concerns about elevated phosphate from the rivers being transferred into the Minneapolis city lakes resulted in the dismantling of the program in the 1990s. Brownie receives stormwater inputs from Minneapolis and St. Louis Park.

Doubling of sodium and chloride ions in the surface and bottom waters from the 1970s to 2010s was caused by the use of road salt in de-icing. Sodium and chloride are equimolar throughout the lake, signifying a source from the halite (NaCl). Minnesota began using salt to de-ice roads in 1950. Past stormwater inputs from nearby Interstate 394 were likely a direct source of salt. Road salt has been linked to enhanced chemical stratification in Twin Cities lakes, including Brownie Lake. While lake lowering initiated the onset of meromixis (see History), road salt pollution stabilizes the lake against intermixing.

== Geology ==
The geology of Minneapolis in the vicinity of Brownie Lake generally consists of lower Paleozoic carbonates and clastic rocks overlain by unconsolidated Pleistocene glacial sediments. Holocene alluvium and wetland sediments are also found adjacent to the lake.

The uplands immediately surrounding Brownie Lake are composed of a mixture of sands, gravels, and glacial tills deposited during the Last Glacial Maximum by the Laurentide Ice Sheet between 16,500 and 13,900 cal yr BP. These deposits include a mixture of sediments derived from both northwest- and northeast-sourced glacial ice, with northeast-sourced sediments containing a greater abundance of iron-rich rocks from the Lake Superior region.

Brownie Lake lies on the edge of a buried bedrock valley filled with as much as 300 feet of glacial debris. The buried valleys in the Twin Cities region likely represent river incision from previous interglacials, which were filled with sediments during the Last Glacial Maximum. These buried valleys have little surface expression, but are associated with clusters of lakes, and locally influenced the course of modern rivers and streams.

A bicycle guide to the Geology of the Chain of Lakes includes a stop at Brownie Lake.

== Natural history ==
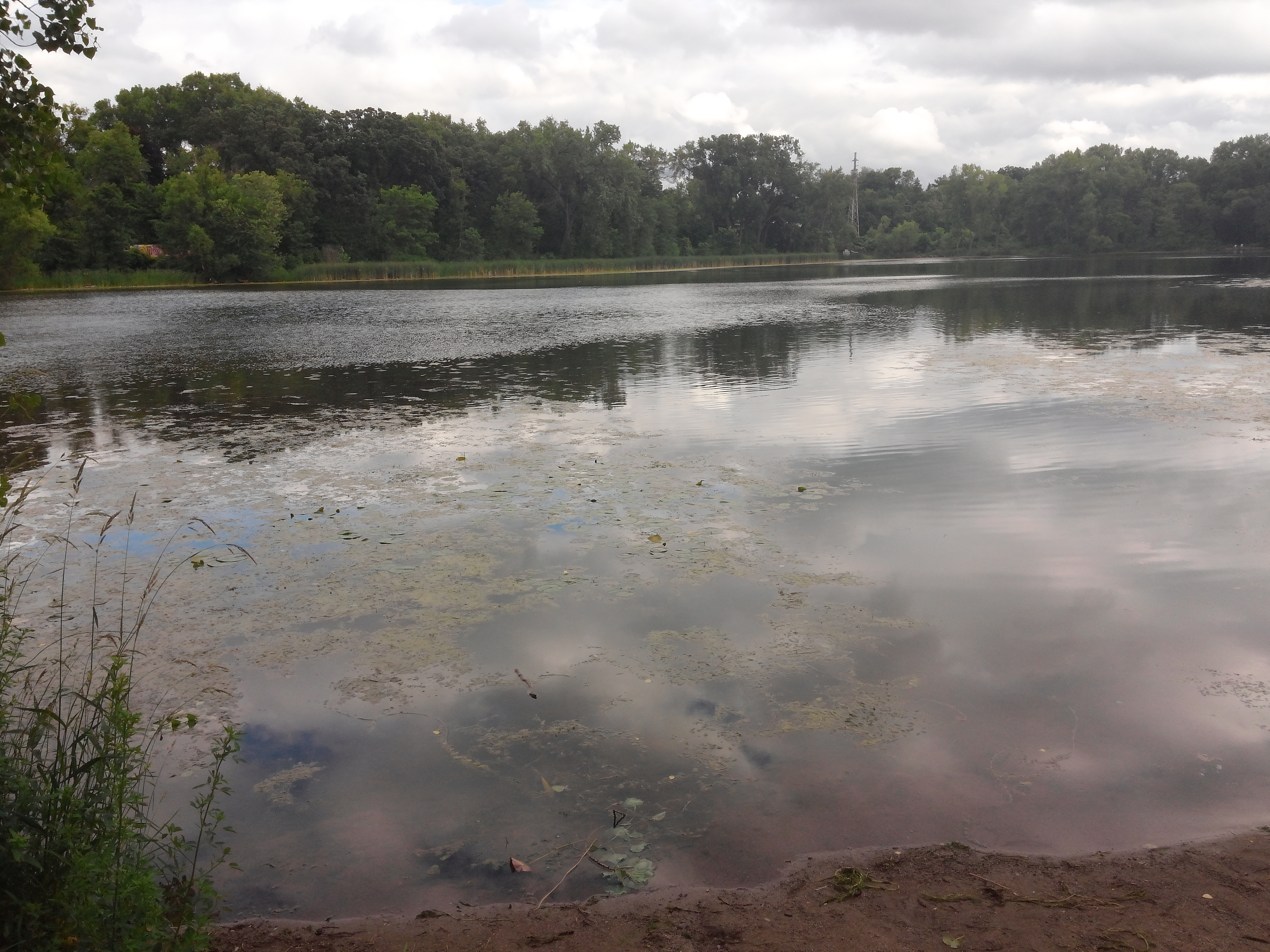
Brownie Lake at shore level

Open water plants in Brownie Lake include yellow and white water lilies, coontail, pondweeds, and lesser duckweed. The aquatic invasive species Eurasian watermilfoil and curly-leaf pondweed are also present. The surrounding area is composed of altered forest/woodland, prairie, and dry-mesic forest/woodland.

The Minnesota Department of Natural Resources reports a number of fish taxa in Brownie Lake including black bullhead, black crappie, bluegill, hybrid sunfish, largemouth bass, northern pike, pumpkinseed, tiger muskellunge, walleye, yellow bullhead, yellow perch, bowfin (dogfish), common carp, white sucker, fathead minnow, and golden shiner.

Phytoplankton predominate over zooplankton in Brownie Lake. In recent monitoring (2012), Cryptomonads (Cryptophyta) were most abundant in winter. Chrysophyte populations peaked in April, while Dinoflagellates (Pyrrhophyta) and green algae (Chlorophyta) both peaked in June. The summer was then dominated by cyanobacteria (Cyanophyta), with an increase in Cryptomonad (Cryptophyta) abundance by October.

Brownie Lake is inhabited by methanogenic archaea in the anoxic bottom waters, which produce methane (CH_{4}; natural gas). A population of methanotrophic bacteria at the chemoclineconsume methane diffusing out of the anoxic portion of the lake by reaction with oxygen. A new species of bacteria was discovered from Brownie Lake in 2021 and named "Candidatus Chlorobium masyuteum". This organism is photosynthetic, and uses sunlight energy to convert dissolved iron into rust. The epithet "masyuteum" was derived from the Dakota phrase mas’yúte, meaning “eats iron”.

== History ==
The land surrounding Brownie Lake was purchased by William McNair shortly after the land west of the Mississippi River was opened for white settlement in 1857. McNair named the lake "Brownie", after a nickname of his daughter, Agnes McNair. It was formerly called "Hillside Harbor". Brownie Lake was then acquired by the expansion of the Glenwood Park, now Theodore Wirth Park, in 1907.

In 1867 the St. Paul & Pacific Railroad Company built a railroad track across the southern end of Brownie Lake. In 1883 James J. Hill took over the St. Paul & Pacific Railroad and expanded the track into a double track mainline that connected the wheat fields west of the Mississippi to the flour mills of Minneapolis. The expansion of the railroad embankment in 1883 filled in the southwestern arm of Brownie Lake, and reduced the surface area of Brownie Lake by 34%.

The lake's surface area was further decreased by 56% between 1913 and 1917 after channels were constructed to connect Cedar Lake and Lake of the Isles (1913), and Cedar Lake and Brownie Lake (1916). The hydraulic connections reduced the lake level of Brownie Lake by 2 to 3 meters, which drew Brownie Lake down into its steep-sided local catchment, significantly reducing its surface area, and increasing shelter from wind.

It is most likely that Brownie Lake became meromictic as a result of the significant decrease in the ability of wind to impart energy to the surface of the lake, both due to sheltering and reduced maximum fetch (the maximum distance the wind can travel across the water). When the wind no longer mixed oxygenated surface water with the bottom waters of Brown Lake, sedimentary iron became soluble and was mobilized into the anoxic bottom water at a concentration several hundred times greater than the surface water, increasing the relative density of the bottom water and beginning a positive feedback system in which other ions such as sodium and chloride could also accumulate, further minimizing the probability that wind energy would be sufficient to mix surface water into the increasingly dense bottom water. The onset of meromixis likely occurred by 1925.

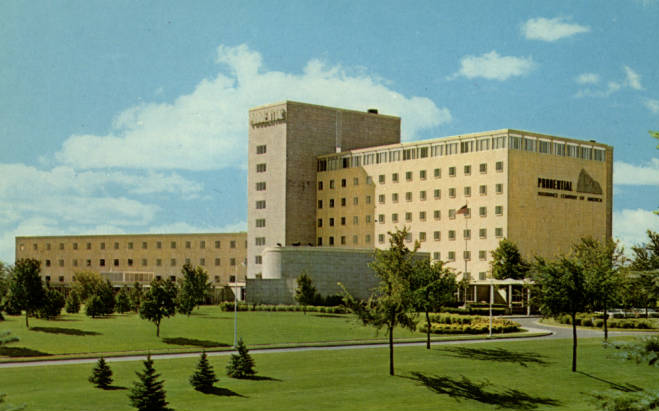
The Prudential office west of Brownie Lake, c. 1960s

The land west of Brownie Lake, which had been a part of Theodore Wirth Park, was sold in 1952 to the Prudential Insurance Company. It was sold to Target Corporation in 1994. Target Corporation relocated employees from this site in 2015, and put the property on the market.

== Recreational facilities ==
Brownie Lake is encircled by a packed dirt walking path. An additional paved multi-use path, the Cedar Lake Trail, runs north-south along Cedar Lake Parkway, just to the east and elevated above Brownie Lake. This path is part of the Grand Rounds National Scenic Byway.

Within Brownie Lake Park, a 1.4-mile single track mountain biking trail loops along the western slope of the Brownie Lake basin. This trail connects to the Glenwood Loop and the Southwest Wirth loop, and all trails are maintained by Minnesota Off-Road Cyclists. This was the first "Black Diamond" trail in Minneapolis, built in 2016.

Motor boats are not permitted on Brownie Lake. A canoe/kayak rack is stationed near the dirt boat ramp at the northwest end of the lake, and rack spaces can be rented from the Minneapolis Park and Recreation Board.

In the winter, the Chain of Lakes Ski Trail extends for 1 km from the tunnel to Cedar Lake, across the lake and up the western side of the basin, connecting up with the Theodore Wirth Park trails. Trails are maintained through a partnership of the Minneapolis Park and Recreation Board and the Loppet Foundation. Trail passes are available from the Loppet Foundation.
