= Northland Arboretum =

Non-profit arboretum and nature reserve in Brainerd, Minnesota, United States

Coordinates: 46°21′29″N 94°13′44″W

- Interactive map of Northland Arboretum
- Website: Official website

The Northland Arboretum is a 413-acre non-profit arboretum and nature reserve in Brainerd, Minnesota, United States.

The arboretum was founded in 1972 when the Brainerd Landfill closed; that original 40-acre (160,000 m^{2}) landfill site now supports a grassland. The Arboretum now contains a Red Pine plantation and an area of Jack Pine savanna, with nearly 20 kilometers of trails for hiking and cross-country skiing, of which nearly 5 kilometers are lit for evening skiing. Other areas include a native tree trail, youth gardens, a wildflower trail, and a pond with arched bridge. The Nature Conservancy owns nearly 200 acres (0.81 km^{2}) within the arboretum.

Arboretum plants include woodland wildflowers such as shinleaf, rattlesnake-plantain, blue-bead lily, and pink lady's slipper; prairie vegetation such as silky prairie clover, birdfoot violet, blue-eyed grass, gayfeather, and pasque flower; and grasses such as big bluestem, kalm's brome, muly-grass, porcupine grass, and June grass.

== See also ==
- List of botanical gardens in the United States
