= Grand Rounds National Scenic Byway =

Parkway system in Minneapolis

Grand Rounds National Scenic Byway

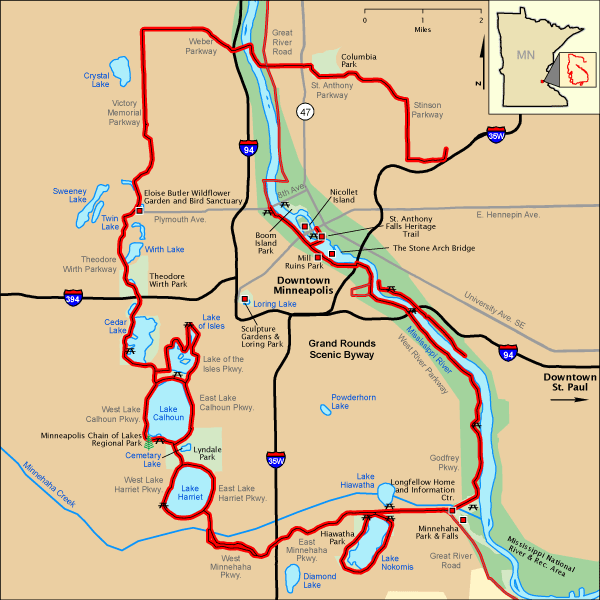
- Route map of the Grand Rounds in Minneapolis

Route information
- Length: 50 mi (80 km)
- Existed: 1891–present

Location
- Country: United States
- States: Minnesota

Highway system
- Scenic Byways; National; National Forest; BLM; NPS

The Grand Rounds National Scenic Byway is a linked series of park areas in Minneapolis, Minnesota, United States, that takes a roughly circular path through the city. The Minneapolis Park and Recreation Board developed the system over many years. The corridors include roads for automobile traffic plus separate paths for pedestrians and bicycles, and extend slightly into neighboring cities. About 50 miles (80 km) of roadway and paths are in the system, and much of it was built in the 1930s as part of Civilian Conservation Corps projects.

== Byway districts ==
There are seven districts along the byway:

1. Downtown Riverfront lies along the Mississippi River, and includes Saint Anthony Falls and nearby historic milling districts. The byway follows West River Parkway, beginning at Plymouth Avenue, passing Boom Island Park and Nicollet Island Park (both across the river), and Mill Ruins Park, adjacent to the Mill City Museum and the Stone Arch Bridge.
2. Mississippi River gorge area extends from downtown Minneapolis to Minnehaha Park. The byway follows West River Parkway, and passes the west bank of the University of Minnesota. After Franklin Avenue there are multiple access points from the byway to the adjacent Winchell Trail. Several bridges connect the byway with trails on the east bank, in both Minneapolis and Saint Paul. Portions of this section of the route are also part of the signed Mississippi River Trail (MRT) bicycle route.
3. Minnehaha including Minnehaha Park, Minnehaha Creek, Lake Nokomis, and Lake Hiawatha. The byway follows Godfrey Parkway through Minnehaha Park, past Minnehaha Falls and the Longfellow House information center. Crossing Hiawatha Avenue, the route becomes Minnehaha Parkway. The road passes between Lakes Nokomis and Hiawatha, and then follows Minnehaha Creek to Lake Harriet.
4. The Chain of Lakes includes seven parks, and its name dates back to the 19th century, when an article referred to "the chain of lakes which, 'like a necklace of diamond in settings of emerald,' enriches Minneapolis." The Chain of Lakes district consists of Lake Harriet, Lyndale Park, Lyndale Farmstead, Bde Maka Ska, Lake of the Isles, Cedar Lake, and Brownie Lake.
5. Theodore Wirth (extending into Golden Valley) consists of Theodore Wirth Park. The byway follows Cedar Lake Parkway as it crosses Interstate 394 and becomes Theodore Wirth Parkway. Heading north, it passes the Eloise Butler Wildflower Garden and Wirth Lake. Crossing Olson Memorial Highway, the parkway enters Theodore Wirth Golf Course.
6. Victory Memorial includes the northwestern edge of Minneapolis. The byway follows Victory Memorial Parkway, which commemorates the contributions of people from Hennepin County in World War I. Victory Memorial Parkway becomes Weber Parkway. The byway follows the Camden Bridge across the Mississippi River, which marked the head of navigation for barge traffic on the river until the lock at Upper Lock and Dam was taken out of service.
7. Northeast runs through Northeast Minneapolis. The byway follows St Anthony Parkway to Stinson Parkway, and follows that road south to Ridgway Parkway. It passes Columbia Park and Deming Heights Park, and terminates at Francis Gross Golf Course.

== Shared-use paths ==
The Grand Rounds trail system features approximately 50 miles (80 km) of off-street paths for bicycles and pedestrians that make a continuous loop around Minneapolis.

=== Paths ===
- Memorial and Webber Parkways—3.85 miles (6.20 km)
- Wirth Parkway—3.54 miles (5.70 km)
- Dean Parkway—0.59 miles (0.95 km)
- William Berry Parkway—0.56 miles (0.90 km)
- Minnehaha Creek—4.93 miles (7.93 km)
- Godfrey Parkway—0.5 miles (0.80 km)
- West River and James I. Rice Parkways—7.25 miles (11.67 km)
- East River Parkway—approximately 2.1 miles (3.4 km)
- St. Anthony Parkway—2.8 miles (4.5 km)
- Stinson Parkway—0.95 miles (1.53 km)
- Ridgeway Parkway—0.75 miles (1.21 km)

=== Paths around lakes ===
- Lake Nokomis—2.7 miles (4.3 km)
- Lake Harriet—2.75 miles (4.43 km)
- Bde Mka Ska (formerly Lake Calhoun)—3.1 miles (5.0 km)
- Lake of the Isles—2.6 miles (4.2 km)
- Cedar Lake—1.68 miles (2.70 km)

== Management ==
The area was designated as a Minnesota State Scenic Byway in 1997 and a National Scenic Byway in 1998. The Grand Rounds are considered to be the most significant example of an urban byway, as most such areas run through rural regions. Portions are also part of the Great River Road along the Mississippi River.

The city purchased all the land immediately adjoining its lakes during its formative period, turning them into public parks rather than allowing them to be privately developed. Because of this, Minneapolis' lakes are accessible by the general public.

Heavy vehicles such as semi-trailer trucks and buses are largely banned from the byway, and the speed limit is 25 miles per hour throughout. Thanks to the low speed limit, motorcycle riders enjoy riding through the parkway system. Much of the asphalt paving along the road has a reddish tone so that drivers can more easily determine where to go upon reaching intersections.

== Photo gallery ==
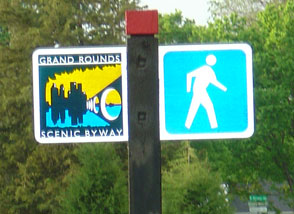
Sign and symbol designating the route

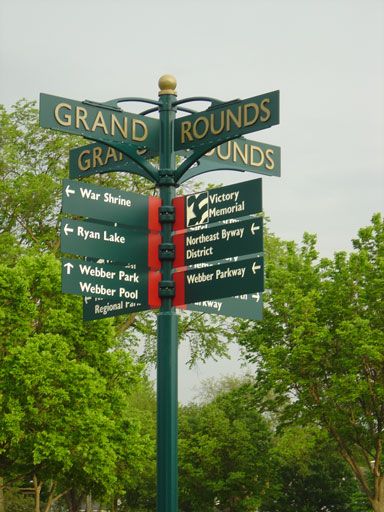
Directional street sign

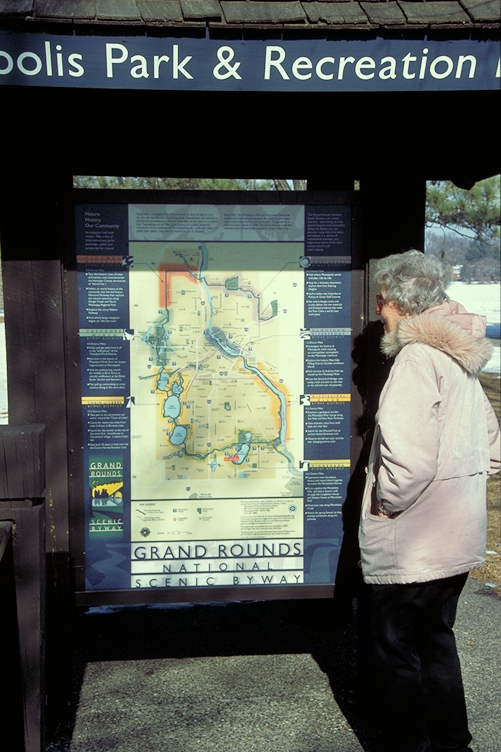
Informational kiosk

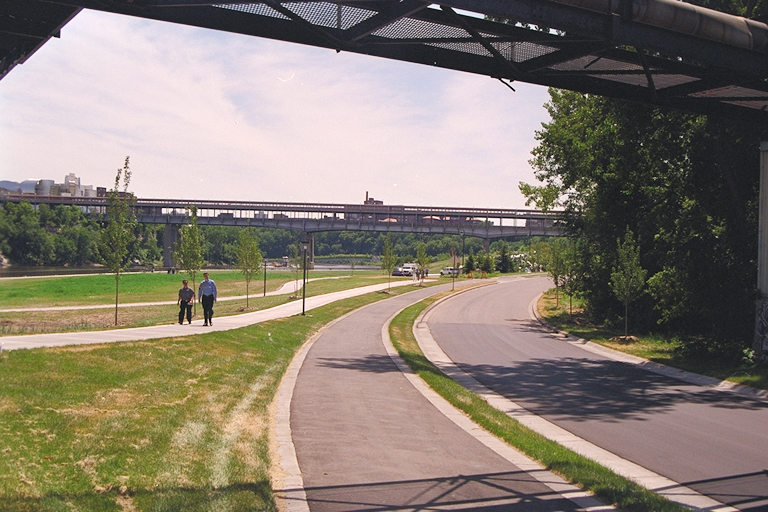
East River Flats' separate roadway and paths

== See also ==
- List of shared-use paths in Minneapolis
