= Victory Memorial Parkway =

Coordinates: 45°2′13″N 93°19′9″W

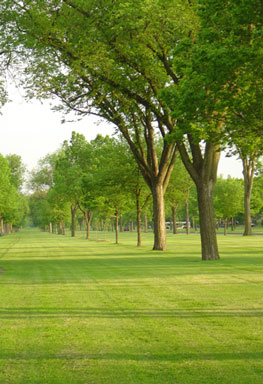
The greenway boulevard of Victory Memorial Parkway

Victory Memorial Parkway, or Victory Memorial Drive, is a section of the Grand Rounds Scenic Byway that lies between Minneapolis, Minnesota, United States and Robbinsdale, Minnesota, United States. The parkway runs along the northwestern and northern boundaries of the Victory neighborhood and Camden community.

Trees and memorials located throughout the parkway were established to honor the memory of the servicemen of Hennepin County. A wide central boulevard within the parkway serves as a recreational park.

The Victory Memorial Parkway also provides visitor access to the Mississippi River, North Mississippi Regional Park and Shingle Creek.

== History ==
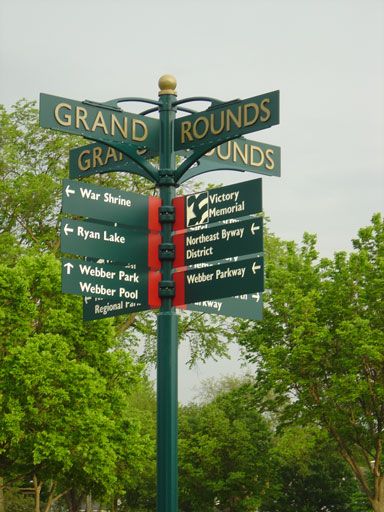
A street sign displays Victory Parkway's scenic attractions

The Minneapolis Park and Recreation Board (MPRB) began acquiring land for the "Parkway" in 1910. The parkway was completed in 1921 and was dedicated as a memorial to servicemen and nurses from Hennepin County who died in World War I. A statue of Abraham Lincoln erected on the northwestern curve of the parkway was dedicated on May 25, 1930, by surviving members of the Grand Army of the Republic in honor of their comrades who gave their lives in the Civil War.

Various improvements have taken place since that time including the installation of the bicycle path (trail) in 1975. When the Metropolitan Council regional park system was created in 1974, the parkway along with other major parks in Minneapolis became part of the regional system. In 2003, the Minnesota Legislature passed a bill designating "Victory Memorial Drive" as a state historic district.

Over the years, the original monuments had fallen into disrepair and many of the hundreds of elm trees planted had died. Hennepin County and the State of Minnesota funded a $6.7 million project to repair the Parkway. Victory Memorial was rededicated in June, 2011. Improvements include new and refurbished monuments and memorials, including a restoration of the nearby Grand Army of the Republic Circle and a statue of Abraham Lincoln, and dozens of new trees and flower beds. Victory Drive itself was resurfaced with new asphalt.

An annual 5 and 10K race is held during the first week of September along Victory Memorial Drive. The MDRA Victory Race is sponsored by the Minnesota Distance Running Association (MDRA) and will be in its 31st year in 2013.

== Photo gallery ==
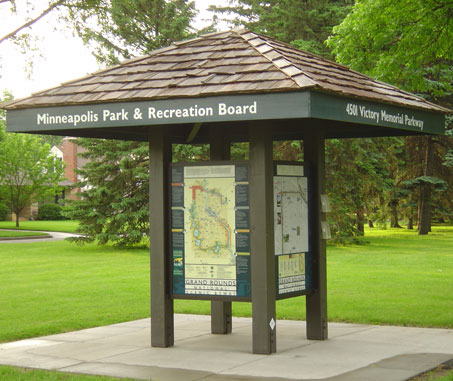
An informational kiosk on the parkway

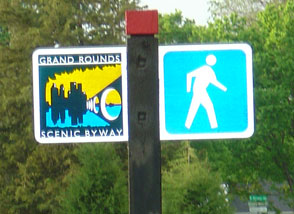
A pedestrian sign on Victory Memorial Drive

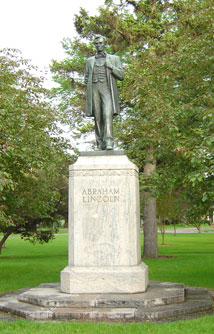
Statue of Abraham Lincoln on Victory Memorial Drive

Map of the dedication of Victory Memorial Parkway in June 1921.

Aerial photograph of Victory Memorial Drive, c. 1921

== See also ==
- List of shared-use paths in Minneapolis
