= Theodore Wirth =

Swiss-born American architect (1863–1949)

- Born: January 15, 1863; Winterthur, Switzerland
- Died: January 29, 1949 (aged 86); San Diego, California, U.S.
- Resting place: Lakewood Cemetery

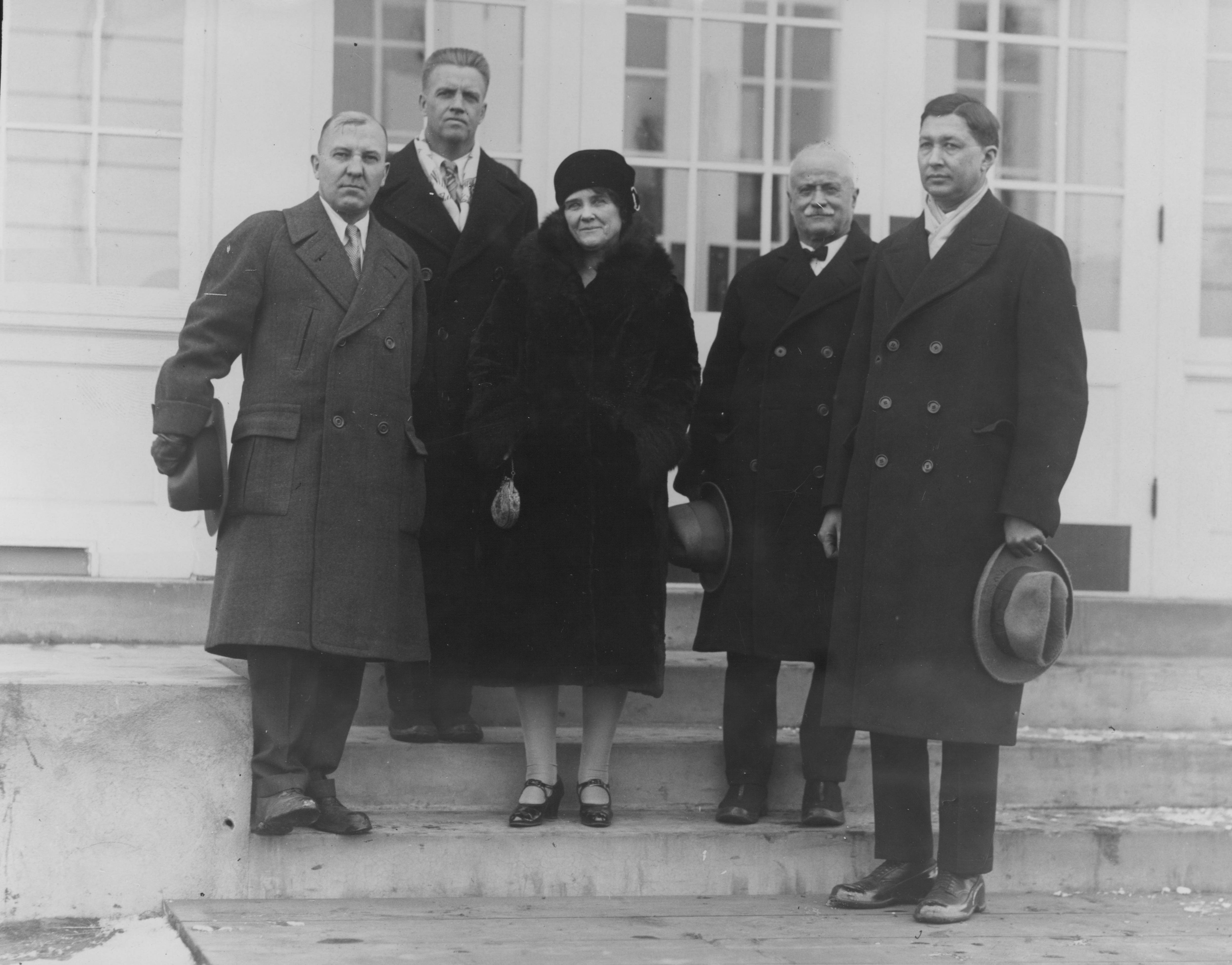
Wirth (2nd from right) with other Park Board officials in 1928

Theodore Wirth (1863–1949) was instrumental in designing the Minneapolis system of parks. Swiss-born, he was widely regarded as the dean of the local parks movement in the United States. The various titles he was given included administrator of parks, horticulturalist, and park planner. Before emigrating to America in 1888, he worked as a florist and landscaper in Zurich, London, and Paris. He married Leonie Mense, the daughter of his employer in Glen Cove, Long Island, before taking a job as superintendent of parks in Hartford, Connecticut in 1896, where he developed the first municipal rose garden in the country.

In 1904 the city of Minneapolis offered him the position of Superintendent of Parks in that fast-growing Midwest city. Although he didn't act on it, his stated goal provided for a playground within a quarter-mile of every child and a complete recreation center within a half-mile of every family. During his 30-year tenure there, he managed the expansion the park system from 1,810 acres (7 km^{2}) to 5,241 acres (21 km^{2}), in a city of 37,387 acres (14%). Park land included parks, golf courses, flower gardens and boulevards. Unlike earlier park planners, he believed that parks ought to be used by the residents. His park development is enjoyed daily by residents and visitors on the Grand Rounds Scenic Byway, at Minnehaha Falls, along the 12-mile (19 km) path following Minnehaha Creek, at Lake Harriet, Bde Maka Ska, Lyndale Park, Winchell Trail, and scores of other public open spaces in Minneapolis. The lakes, parks, and outdoor recreation areas that Minneapolis features are often cited by users as some of the most important factors in their quality of life.

Wirth was buried in Lakewood Cemetery.

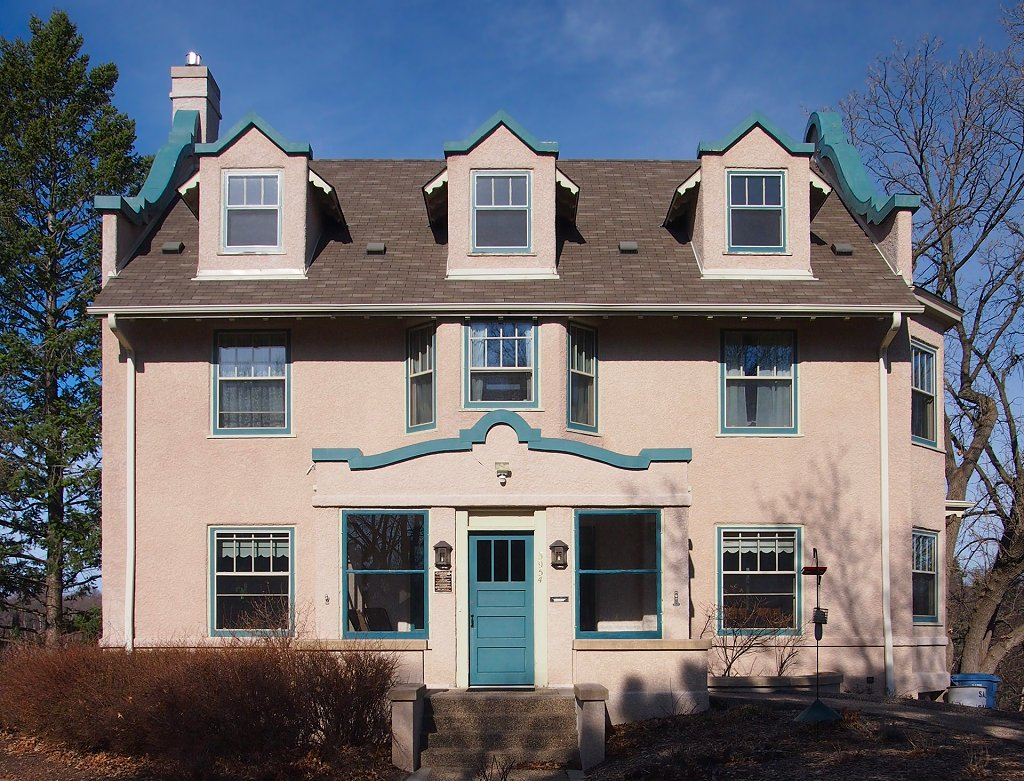
Wirth's home and park planning offices

Several Minneapolis recreation areas bear his name, including the 38-acre (150,000 m^{2}) Wirth Lake, which is in Theodore Wirth Park. At 743 acres (3.0 km^{2}), it is by far the largest park in the Minneapolis park system. The Theodore Wirth House-Administration Building is on the National Register of Historic Places because "it was built as a home for Theodore Wirth, an international figure in the field of park design" and "his administration offices within the building were the actual location where Theodore Wirth designed or redesigned the award-winning Minneapolis parks."

The house was constructed to Wirth's specification and located in a corner of Lyndale Farmstead Park. Wirth wanted to be inspired by watching people using parks. In 2004 the Theodore Wirth Statue Garden, designed by his grandson Theodore J. Wirth, was opened. The sculpture, by Bill Rains, consists of a 115%-sized bronze statue of Wirth surrounded by twelve children representing the diverse population of Minneapolis and his policies of equal access for all people regardless of race or economic status. Wirth left his legacy in Minneapolis and via his three children: Conrad L. Wirth became director of the National Park Service; Walter L. Wirth was superintendent of parks in New Haven, Connecticut, and superintendent of the Salem, Oregon, Regional Parks System. The third son, Theodore, enjoyed a distinguished career, attaining the rank of admiral in the U.S. Navy.
