= Powderhorn Park, Minneapolis =

Powderhorn Park
- Neighborhood
- Powderhorn Art Fair 2026

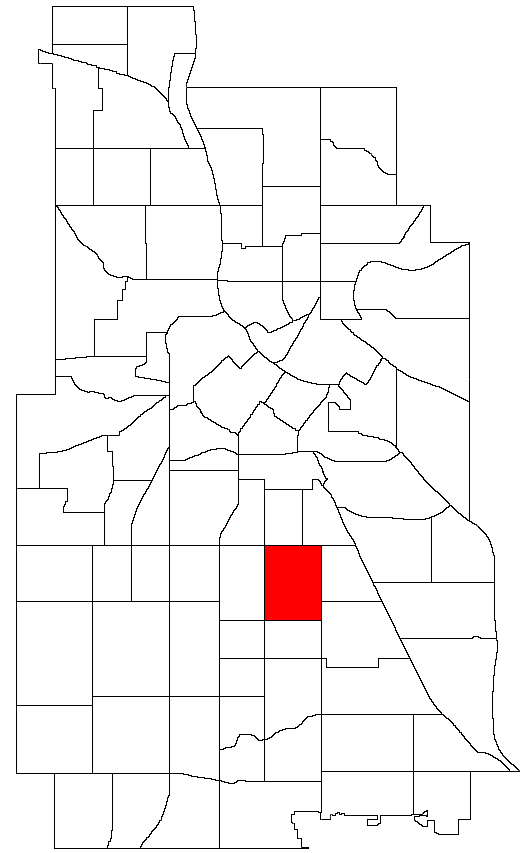
- Location of Powderhorn Park within the U.S. city of Minneapolis
- Interactive map of Powderhorn Park
- Coordinates: 44°56′23″N 93°15′12″W
- Country: United States
- State: Minnesota
- County: Hennepin
- City: Minneapolis
- Community: Powderhorn
- Founded: 1849
- City Council Ward: 9

Government
  - Council Member: Jason Chavez

Area
  - Total: 0.731 sq mi (1.89 km^{2})

Population (2020)
  - Total: 8,440
  - Density: 11,500/sq mi (4,460/km^{2})
- Time zone: UTC-6 (CST)
  - Summer (DST): UTC-5 (CDT)
- ZIP code: 55407
- Area code: 612

Historical population
Census	Pop.	Note	%±
1980	5,981		—
1990	7,864		31.5%
2000	8,957		13.9%
2010	8,655		−3.4%
2020	8,440		−2.5%

Powderhorn Park is a neighborhood within the larger Powderhorn community of Minneapolis. The neighborhood is located approximately three miles south of downtown and is bordered by East Lake Street to the north, Cedar Avenue to the east, East 38th Street to the south, and Chicago Avenue to the west. Its namesake is the city's Powderhorn Park facility in the northwestern part of the neighborhood around Powderhorn Lake.

== History ==
Developed mainly between 1905 and 1920, it is a residential area consisting of single-family homes, duplexes, and three-story brick apartment buildings. The neighborhood is located in Minneapolis City Council ward 9 and state legislative districts 62A and 62B.

In 2009, a group of residents started the Powderhorn365 program that documents the day-to-day life of the neighborhood, through a daily photograph from the neighborhood.

On May 25, 2020, the neighborhood was the site of the murder of George Floyd. In response, residents of the neighborhood have vowed not to call the police; "doing so, they believed, would add to the pain that black residents of Minneapolis were feeling and could put them in danger." Protesters converted the 38th and Chicago intersection into George Floyd Square, an occupation protest and memorial site for George Floyd that persisted into 2021.

== Demographics ==
Approximately 8,500 people live in Powderhorn Park, down from about 9,000 in 2000. Since 2000, the proportion of residents who are non-Hispanic whites has increased to nearly 50%. Hispanic or Latinos of any race are 30% of the population. Along Lake Street, there are numerous Hispanic and African-American-owned businesses. Around 28% of residents speak a language other than English at home, and 16% are foreign-born residents.

Race/ethnicity
Race/ethnicity	2000		2010		2020	
Race/ethnicity	Number	%	Number	%	Number	%
White alone	3,735	41.7	3,822	44.2	3,911	46.3
Black alone	1,945	21.7	1,198	13.8	1,119	13.3
Hispanic or Latino (any race)	1,971	22.0	2,784	32.2	2,485	29.6
Native American alone	442	4.9	267	3.1	117	1.4
Asian alone	430	4.8	205	2.4	177	2.1
Pacific Islander alone	9	0.1	2	0.0	6	0.1
Other race alone	36	0.4	33	0.4	46	0.6
Two or more races	389	4.3	344	4.0	539	6.4
Total	8,957	100.0	8,655	100.0	8,440	100.0

== Park ==
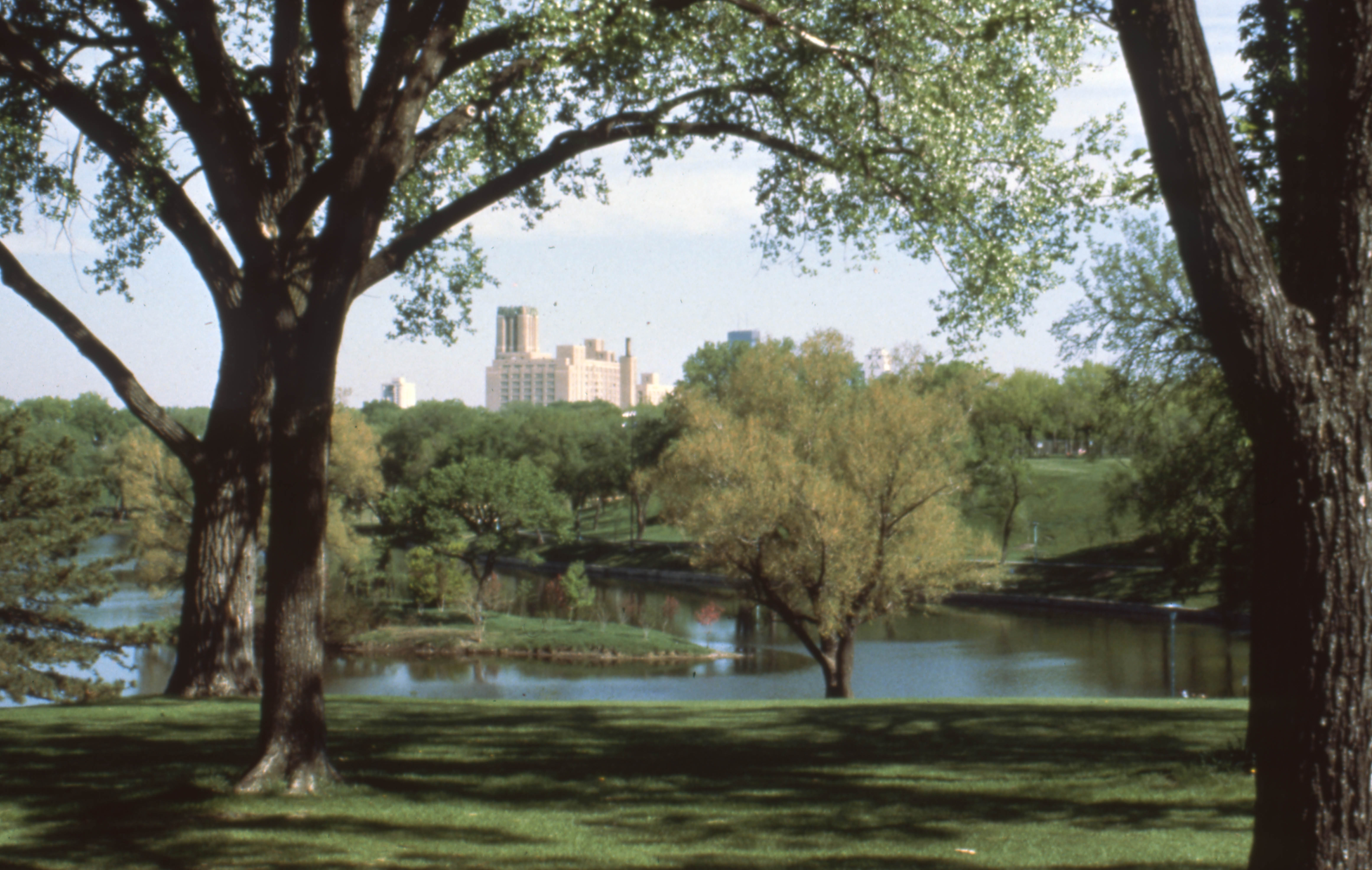
View of Midtown Minneapolis from Powderhorn Park

The Powderhorn Park neighborhood is named for the park in its center, run by the Minneapolis Park and Recreation Board. The name Powderhorn initially comes from Powderhorn Lake, which was curved in a powder horn shape until the mid-1920s, when its northern arm was filled. The park and lake are used as the setting for the last act in the city's annual May Day parade.

An encampment for people experiencing homelessness emerged at the park in mid-2020 as a result of civil disorder in the aftermath of George Floyd's murder. The Powderhorn Park encampment was considered the largest in the history of the Twin Cities metropolitan history.

The park was also the site of several large demonstrations against federal agents and tactics involved in Operation Metro Surge which took place in the winter of 2026.

== Notable residents ==
- Alison Bechdel, cartoonist
- Peter Gross, comic book artist and writer
- Prof, rapper
- Chet Holmgren, NBA player

== See also ==
- 38th Street South
- 2020 Minneapolis park encampments
