= Powderhorn Lake (Minnesota) =

Lake in Minnesota, U.S.

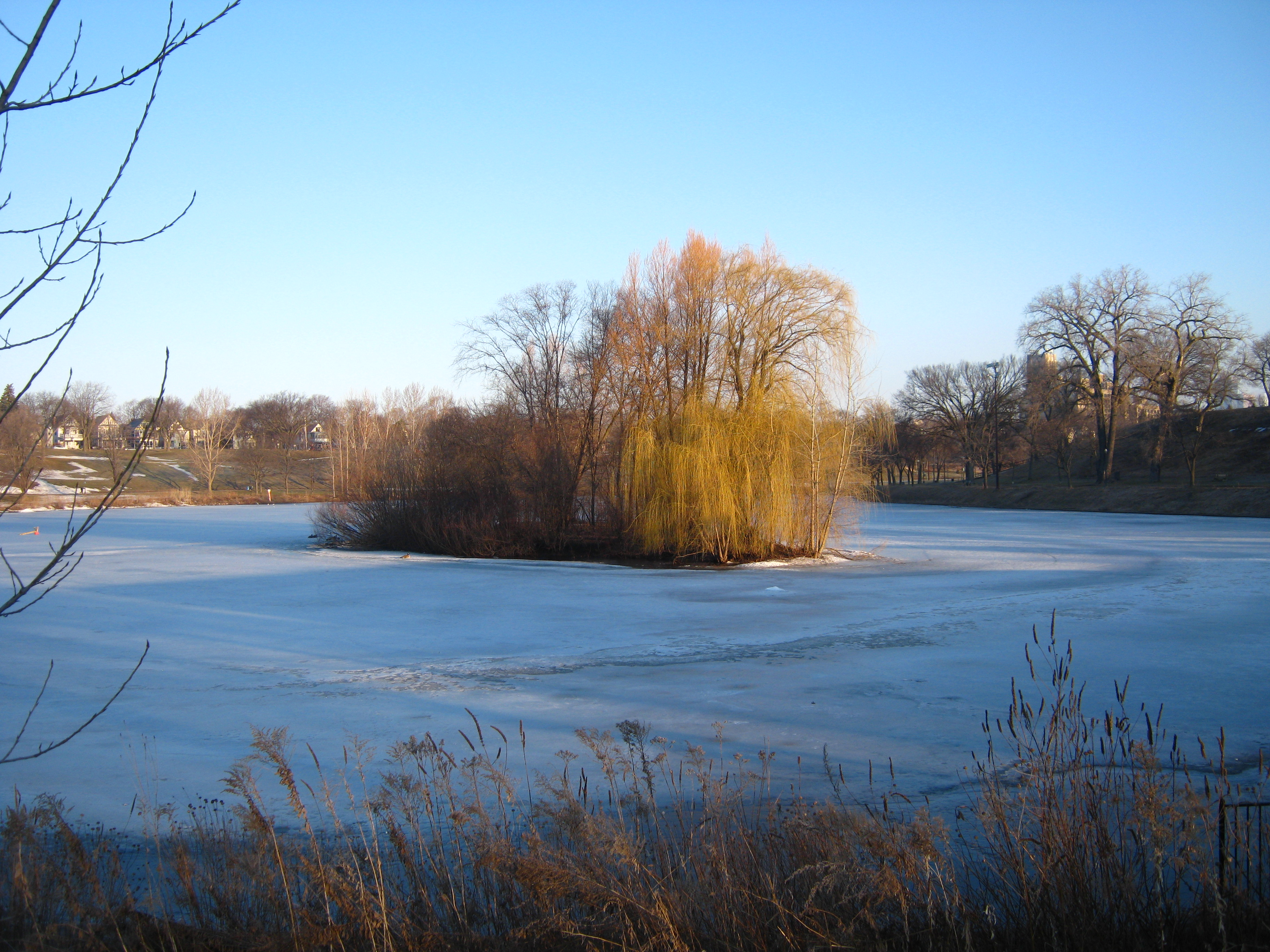
- Powderhorn Lake, April 2011

- Location within Minnesota
- Location: Minneapolis, Minnesota, US
- Coordinates: 44°56′30.2″N 93°15′24.4″W
- Managing agency: Minneapolis Park and Recreation Board
- Surface area: 11.38 acres (0.0461 km^{2})
- Max. depth: 24 feet (7.3 m)
- Shore length^{1}: 0.62 miles (1.00 km)
- ^{1} Shore length is not a well-defined measure.

Powderhorn Lake is a small, natural lake within Powderhorn Park in Minneapolis, Minnesota, United States. The lake has a shoreline of 0.62 miles (1.00 km), a surface area of about 11 acres (0.045 km^{2}), and a maximum depth of 24 feet (7.3 m). The lake is a popular local destination for fishing, and it is serves as a backdrop for many events and activities in Powderhorn Park. The lake takes its name from its original shape that more closely resembled a powder horn.

== Geography ==
The water body is one of 13 lakes in Minneapolis. Several local places names in Minneapolis are derived from the lake. Powderhorn Park is an urban park in the officially designated Powderhorn Park neighborhood, which is within the larger Powderhorn community of Minneapolis.

== History ==
The present lake is the remnant of a curved lake in the middle of what is now Minneapolis. The name Powderhorn Lake was first used for the lake in a map of the area around Fort Snelling in 1839. The lake takes its name from its former shape: it was curved, resembling a powder horn. Since the Minneapolis Park and Recreation Board purchased the lake and adjacent land in 1890, the natural lake has undergone shore alteration, dredging, and groundwater augmentation. In the mid-1920s the northern arm of the lake and the lake no longer had its distinctive powder horn shape.

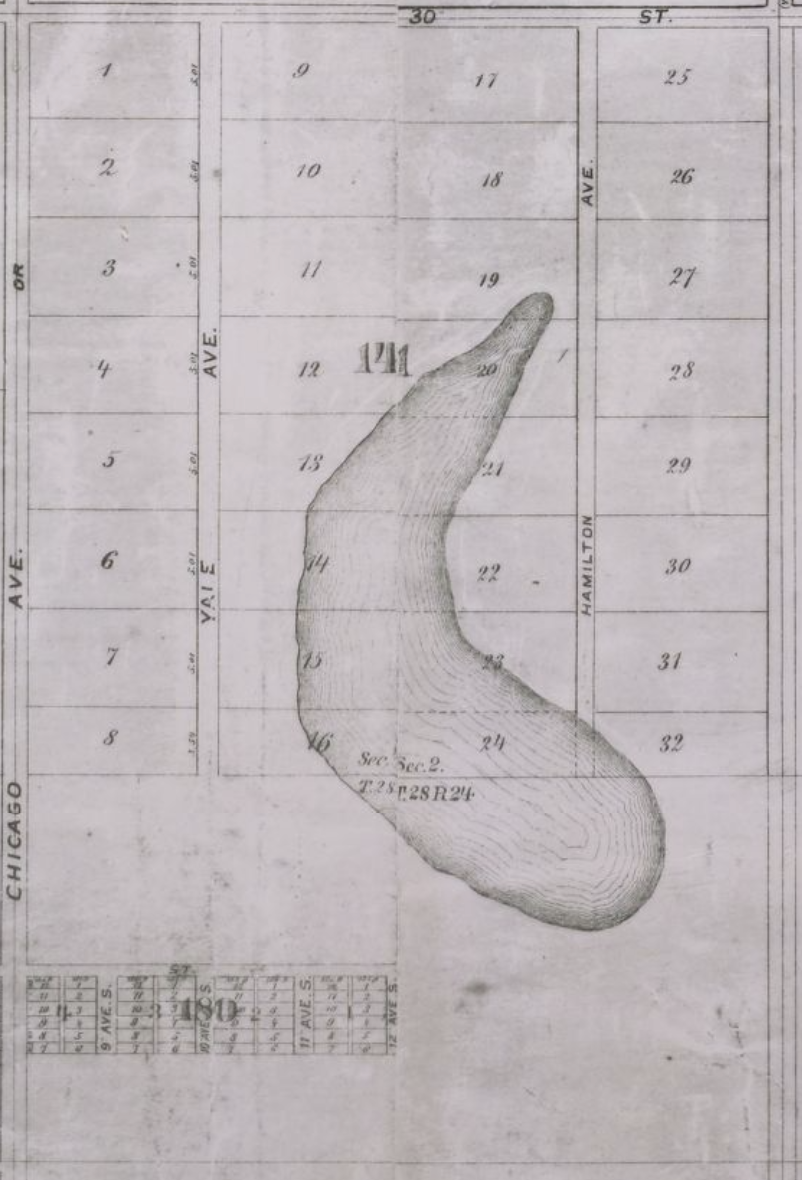
Plat map of Powderhorn Lake and the surrounding area in Minneapolis, 1880

== Recreation ==
Powderhorn Lake is a popular local destination for shore or pier fishing. The lake is stocked annually with bluegill, black crappie, largemouth bass, and channel catfish. There is a fishing pier behind the park's recreation center.

Invasive aquatic plants were first discovered in the lake in 2006. The lake is not considered swimmable.

== See also ==
- Dorothy Franey
- List of lakes in Minneapolis
