= 2021 Minneapolis municipal election =

- November 2, 2021

A general election was held in Minneapolis on November 2, 2021. Minneapolis's mayor was up for election as well as all the seats on the City Council, the two elected seats on the Board of Estimate and Taxation, and all the seats on the Park and Recreation Board. Voters were able to rank up to three candidates for each office in order of preference. Additionally, there were three ballot measures on the ballot related to government structure, public safety, and rent control.

== Mayor ==
Incumbent Minnesota Democratic–Farmer–Labor Party (DFL) Mayor Jacob Frey sought re-election to a second term among a field of 16 candidates. He won with 56% of the vote in the second round of the rank-choice ballot.

== City Council ==
All 13 seats on the Minneapolis City Council were up for election. Each resident of Minneapolis could elect one city council member in a single-member district. Because of re-districting, members were only elected for a two-year term instead of the usual four-year term. The DFL retained their supermajority, winning 12 of the 13 wards and over 85% of total votes cast. Cam Gordon, the council's sole Green Party member, lost to newcomer Robin Wonsley Worlobah. She became the DSA's first representative elected to the Minneapolis City Council.

== Park and Recreation Board ==
All 9 seats on the Minneapolis Park and Recreation Board were up for election in 2021. This includes 6 district commissioners and 3 at-large commissioners. Park commissioners run as nonpartisan.

=== Results ===
==== At-Large ====
Minneapolis Park and Recreation Commissioner at-large seats, 2021
Affiliation	Candidate	FPV (%)	Votes per round							Status
Affiliation	Candidate	FPV (%)	1	2	3	4	5	6	7	Status
Non-partisan	Meg Forney	29.64	31,612	31,629	26,663 (Note: Elected in previous round; reduction in votes is distributed surplus.)	Elected				
Non-partisan	Tom Olsen	19.41	20,702	20,710	21,094	21,935	23,456	27,775	26,664	Elected
Non-partisan	Alicia D. Smith	12.00	12,799	12,806	13,517	15,138	17,317	19,298	19,657	Elected
Non-partisan	Mary McKelvey	11.32	12,074	12,079	13,441	14,936	16,869	18,298	18,458	Lost
Non-partisan	Londel French	11.12	11,906	11,916	12,134	12,505	13,394	Eliminated		
Non-partisan	Charles Rucker	9.11	9,711	9,720	10,128	10,761	Eliminated			
Non-partisan	Katherine Kelly	6.82	7,270	7,272	7,575	Eliminated				
Write-ins	—N/a	0.54	578	Eliminated						
Exhausted ballots				518	2,099	4,712	8,982	14,616	15,208	
Total votes			106,650							
Threshold			26,663							
Undervotes			38,687							
Source: Minneapolis Elections & Voter Services

==== District 1 ====
Running unopposed, Commissioner Billy Menz from District 1 was elected in the first round.

First round, District 1
Candidate	Votes	%
Billy Menz	1,297	84.33
Write-in	281	1.91

==== District 2 ====
Commissioner Becka Thompson was elected after the second round.

Candidate	% 1st Choice	Round 1	Round 2	% Final	Status
Becka Thompson	41.4%	4,479	5,280	48.8%	Elected
Mike Shelton	29.7%	3,212	4,136	38.3%	Lost
Eric Moran	28.2%	3,047	Eliminated		
Write-in	0.7%	73	Eliminated		
Exhausted ballots			1,395		
Total votes		10,811			
Threshold		5,406			
Undervotes		4,534			
Source: Minneapolis Elections & Voter Services

==== District 3 ====
Commissioner Becky Alper was elected for the third district in the first round.

First round, District 3
Candidate	Votes	%
Becky Alper	9,073	59.5%
AK Hassan	3,163	19.4%
Mohamoud Hassan	2,953	19.4%
Write-in	65	0.4%

==== District 4 ====
Commissioner Elizabeth Shaffer was elected for the fourth district in the first round, unseating sitting MPRB president Jono Cowgill.

First round, District 4
Candidate	Votes	%
Elizabeth Shaffer	11,900	61.5%
Jono Cowgill	7,312	37.8%
Write-in	134	0.7%

==== District 5 ====
Steffanie Musich received enough votes after two rounds to be elected for District 5.

Final round, District 5
Candidate	Votes	%
Steffanie Musich	13,331	60.6%
Charles Rodgers	5,886	26.8%
Justin Cermak	2,668	12.1%
Write-in	105	0.5%

==== District 6 ====
Commissioner Cathy Abene was elected to District 6 after the third round.

Candidate	% 1st Choice	Round 1	Round 2	Round 3	% Final	Status
Cathy Abene	26.3%	6,445	8,126	11,621	47.4%	Elected
Bob Fine	25.3%	6,211	7,408	8,222	33.5%	Lost
Risa Hustad	26.8%	6,560	7,239	Eliminated		
Barb Schlaefer	21.4%	5,244	Eliminated			
Write-in	0.3%	62	Eliminated			
Exhausted ballots			1,749	4,679		
Total votes		24,522				
Threshold		12,262				
Undervotes		5,955				
Source: Minneapolis Elections & Voter Services

== Board of Estimate and Taxation ==
The two elected seats on the Board of Estimate and Taxation were up for election. Steve Brandt and Samantha Pree-Stinson were elected from one citywide, at-large district via the single transferable vote.

=== Results ===
Party	Candidate	% 1st Choice	Round 1	Round 2	Round 3	% Final
Non-partisan	Steve Brandt	44.62%	42,672	44,340	31,876	33.33%
Green Party	Samantha Pree-Stinson	26.77%	25,597	26,194	29,493	30.84%
Non-partisan	Pine Salica	21.74%	20,786	21,521	24,137	25.84%
Non-partisan	Kevin Nikiforakis	6.08%	5,815	Eliminated		
Write-in	N/A	0.09%	755	Eliminated		
Exhausted ballots				2,973	10,116	10.58%
Valid votes			95,625			
Threshold			31,876			
Undervotes			49,712			
Source: Minneapolis Elections & Voter Services

== Ballot measures ==
=== Question 1 ===
Question 1 would change the form of government of Minneapolis to an Executive Mayor-Legislative Council. It passed with 52% of the vote.

Question 1: Government structure
Choice	Votes	%
For	74,037	52.41
Against	67,228	47.59
Total	141,265	100.00

=== Question 2 ===
Question 2 results
- Yes: 70%–80% 60%–70% 50%–60% No: 50%–60% 60%–70% 70%–80% 80%–90%

On November 2, 2021, voters in Minneapolis rejected the ballot measure with 80,506 or 56.2 percent of votes cast for "no" versus 62,813 or 43.8% of votes for "yes".

Question 2: Public safety
Choice	Votes	%
For	62,813	43.83
Against	80,506	56.17
Total	143,319	100.00

=== Question 3 ===
Question 3 permitted the Minneapolis City Council to enact rent control on private residential property. It passed with 53% of the vote.

Question 3: Rent control
Choice	Votes	%
For	75,598	53.21
Against	66,468	46.79
Total	142,066	100.00

== See also ==
- 2020 Minneapolis park encampments
