= Powderhorn Park (urban park) =

Urban park in Minneapolis, Minnesota

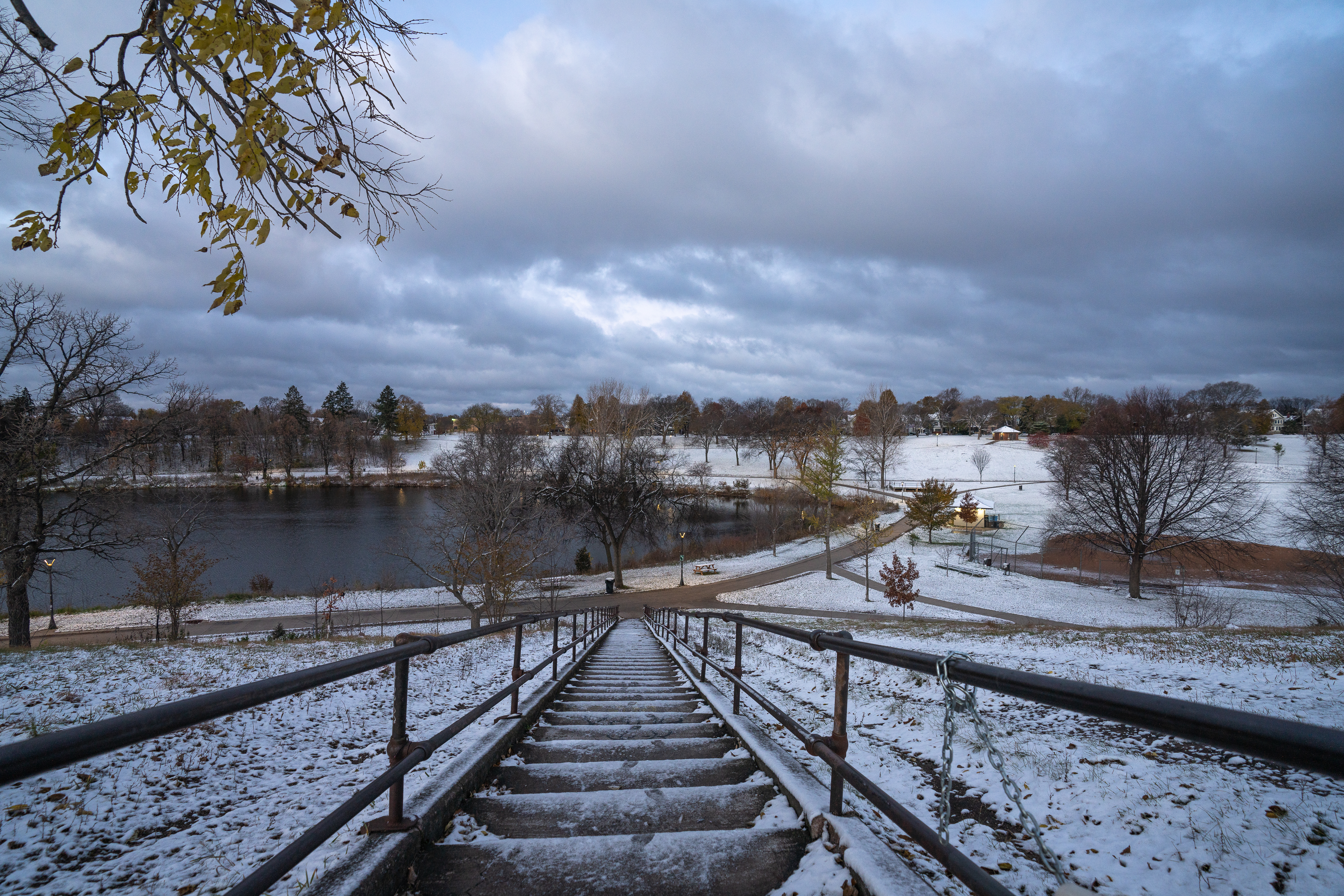
- Powderhorn Park in November 2021
- Interactive map of Powderhorn Park
- Type: Urban park
- Location: Powderhorn Park, Minneapolis, Minnesota
- Coordinates: 44°56′23″N 93°15′12″W
- Area: 65.9 acres (26.7 ha)
- Established: 1887; 139 years ago
- Operator: Minneapolis Park and Recreation Board
- Open: 6 am-10 pm, year-round
- Water: Powderhorn Lake

Powderhorn Park is an urban park in Minneapolis. It sits in the northwest of the Powderhorn Park neighborhood and near the center of the larger Powderhorn community, both of which take their names from the park. The park was established around Powderhorn Lake in the late 19th century.

The park is mostly set at an elevation below the surrounding neighborhood. It contains playing fields, playgrounds and a recreation center that hosts community education classes ranging from pottery to yoga. In winter, the Minneapolis Park and Recreation Board sets up a portable warming house and the lake is used for ice skating. Powderhorn Lake is a popular local destination for shore or pier fishing.

== History ==
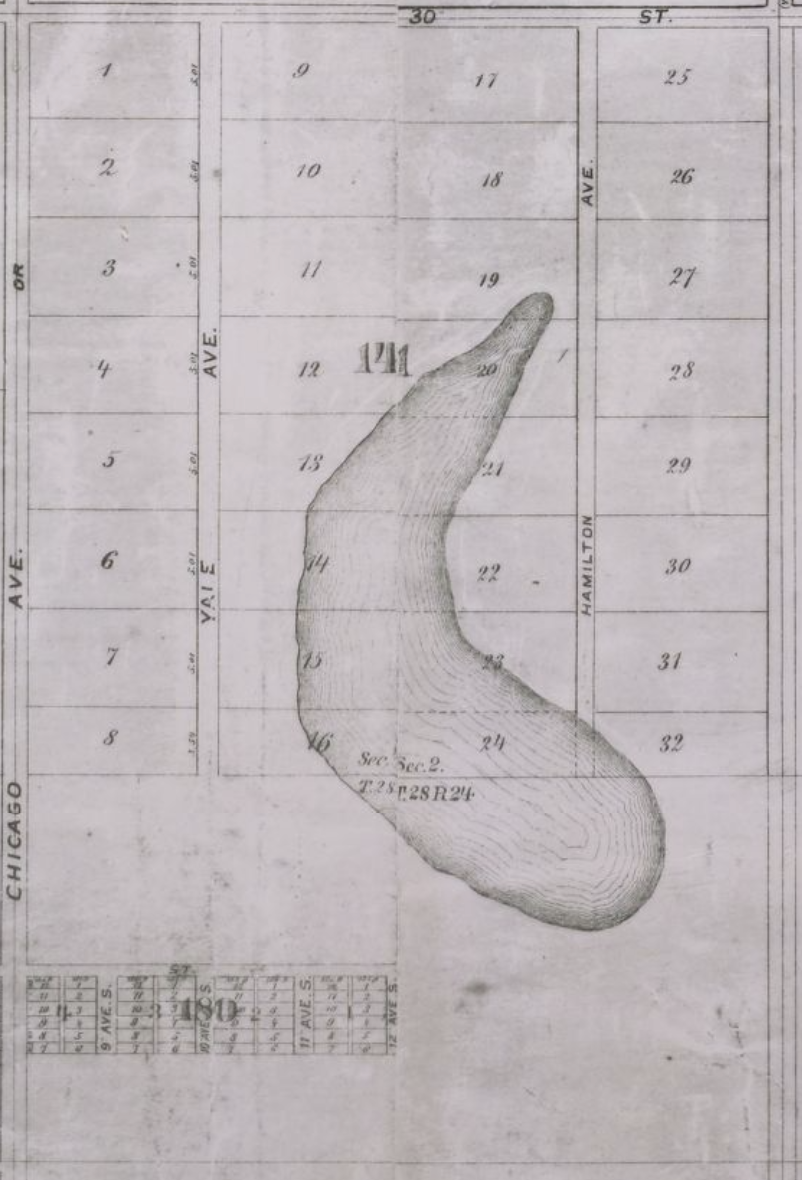
Lake Powderhorn and the surrounding area in 1880

Before there was a park, there was a curved lake in the middle of what is now Minneapolis. The name Powderhorn Lake was first used for the lake in a map of the area around Fort Snelling in 1839. The lake takes its name from its former shape: it was curved, resembling a powder horn, until the mid-1920s, when the northern arm of the lake was filled. The lake is still at the center of the park; the former northern arm now hosts a baseball diamond.

The park was established in the 1880s as the surrounding area was beginning to fill in with housing. In 1883, the Minnesota Legislature and Minneapolis voters approved the founding of the Minneapolis Park and Recreation Board (MPRB), and within months, residents of the area asking for a park around Powderhorn Lake. MPRB designated the lake shore as a park in 1887, then embarked in a slow period of land acquisitions. A 20-acre plot was added in 1891. The ice rink was constructed that year and the recreation center built in 1907. By 1917, the park was shaped almost the same as it is today.

== Events ==
=== Annual and reoccurring ===
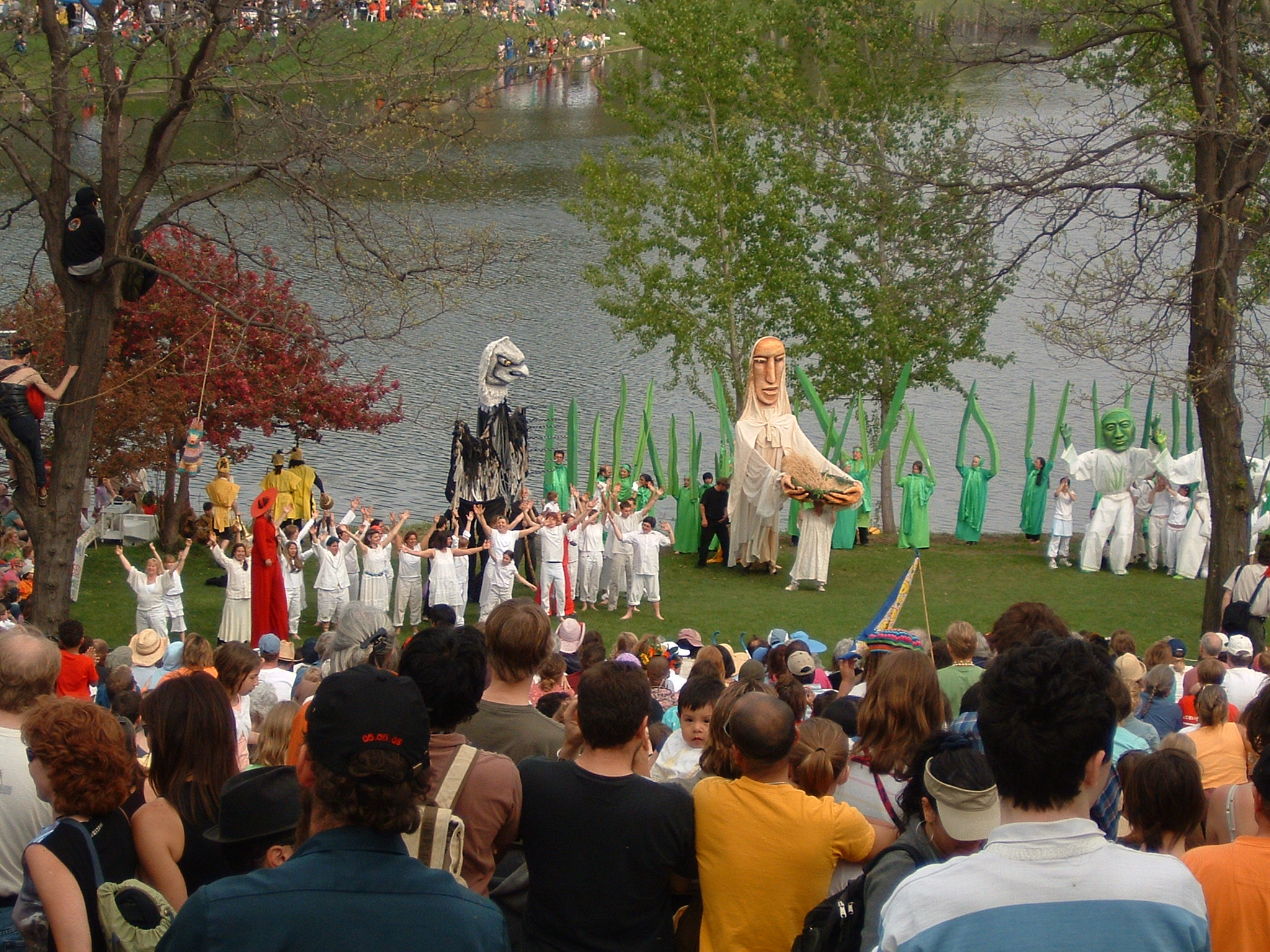
Celebration of May Day in 2006

The park and lake are used as the setting for the last act in the city's annual May Day celebration (occurring on the first Sunday in May), which is a play in motion that has been running since 1975. This was produced by the In the Heart of the Beast Puppet and Mask Theatre through 2022 and continues as a decentralized, community-run endeavor. After the parade, people gather on a hillside at the west end of the park for the Tree of Life ceremony. Many details of the ceremony change from year to year, reflecting on that year’s themes of the parade. but there are several figures that consistently appear: The iconic In The Heart of The Beast puppets, also known as the Big Ones:River, Woods, Prairie, and Sky. The ceremony always ends by a flotilla coming across the lake with the Sun figure in the central boat, surrounded by boats containing percussionists, fire eaters and other musicians. The Sun hits the shore signaling the raising of the Tree of Life puppet (a figure which includes a traditional maypole), and the crowd sings "You Are My Sunshine" and sometimes "Down By The Riverside."

Powderhorn Park is also home to other festivals and decentralized celebrations. The Powderhorn Art Fair, a fine arts and crafts festival, has been held in the park for over 30 years. The park has also hosted the Autonomous Zine Fest. Minneapolis People's Pride, an LGBT pride festival designed to be free of police and corporate presences, has been located in the park since 2021. The Minneapolis Art Sled Rally, an event in which participants sled down the hill in sleds of their own design, often depicting topical characters or themes, has been in Powderhorn Park since 2008. The rally has made the news for its creative and sometimes controversial sled designs.

=== Protests and civil unrest ===
A "defund police" sign and stage before a rally at Powderhorn Park on June 7, 2020.

Powderhorn Park has been a gathering site for protests, including as part of the Black Lives Matter movement. In June 2020, shortly after the Murder of George Floyd, crowds of hundreds gathered in the park to protest the murder and the call for a stronger response from city leadership. There, nine of the thirteen members of the Minneapolis City Council pledged to dismantle the Minneapolis Police Department. In the aftermath of the Killing of Renée Good in 2026, thousands gathered at Powderhorn Park in protest.

An encampment for people experiencing homelessness emerged at Powderhorn Park in mid 2020 as a result of civil disorder in the aftermath of Floyd's murder. Some community members complained about the camp (which brought increased vehicle traffic, drugs, property damage, and at least two overdoses) and changed their behavior to avoid it, and others committed to not involving the police. Some community members delivered meals, medical care, and counseling and sought support from the American Indian Movement to monitor the area. The Powderhorn Park encampment was considered the largest in the history of the Twin Cities metropolitan history, having 560 tents with an estimated 800 people living it by mid July 2020.

== See also ==
- 2020 Minneapolis park encampments
- List of lakes in Minneapolis
