= 2020 Minneapolis park encampments =

Homeless encampments in city parks

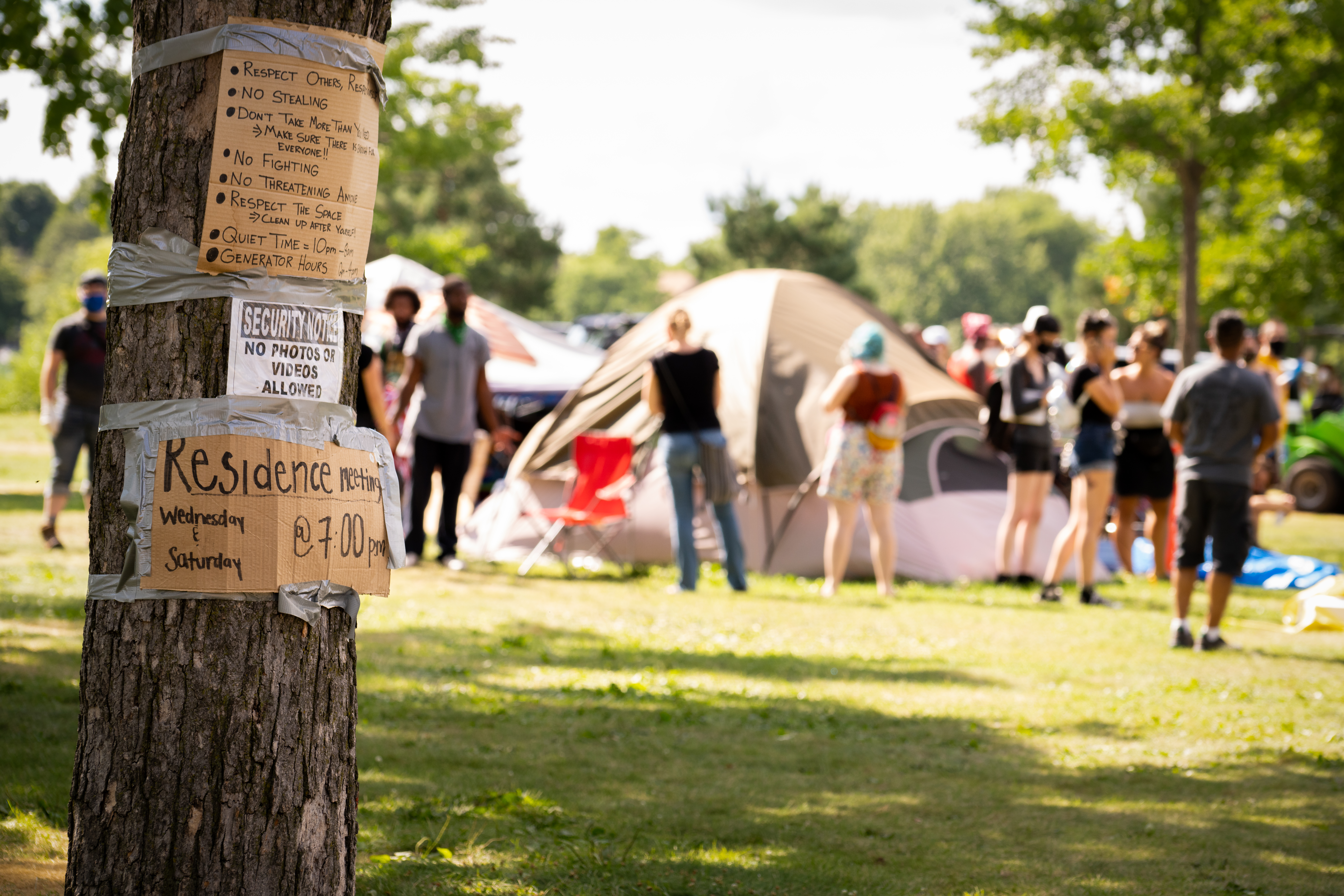
- Encampment in Powderhorn Park, July 20, 2020
- Duration: June 10, 2020 – January 7, 2021
- Venue: Minneapolis parks and public property
- Location: Minneapolis, Minnesota, United States
- Also known as: "Sanctuary sites"
- Type: Tent city
- Cause: Pervasive homelessness; COVID-19 pandemic in Minnesota; Civil unrest; Park board policies
- Budget: Minneapolis: $713,856 for camp services (June 2020 to January 7, 2021); $1 million, including services and lawsuits; Hennepin County: $12 million for added shelter space
- Organised by: Minneapolis Park and Recreation Board
- Participants: Volunteers
- Outcome: Permitted encampments closed January 7, 2021; permits not renewed for 2021
- Deaths: 1 overdose at Sheraton Midtown Hotel; 4 at park encampments, including 1 homicide
- Website: www.minneapolisparks.org/encampments/

In mid-2020, the U.S. city of Minneapolis featured officially and unofficially designated camp sites in city parks for people experiencing homelessness. The emergence of encampments on public property in Minneapolis was the result of pervasive homelessness, mitigation measures related to the COVID-19 pandemic in Minnesota, local unrest after the murder of George Floyd, and local policies that permitted encampments. At its peak in the summer of 2020, there were thousands of people camping at dozens of park sites across the city. Many of the encampment residents came from outside of Minneapolis to live in the parks. By the end of the permit experiment, four people had died in the city's park encampments, including the city's first homicide victim of 2021, who was stabbed to death inside a tent at Minnehaha Park on January 3, 2021.

The encampment crisis grew out of civil unrest following the murder of George Floyd. A period of intense protests, riots, and property destruction lasted from May 26 to 30, 2020—largely concentrated on East Lake Street in Minneapolis—and resulted in the deployment of the Minnesota National Guard, along with nightly curfews to keep demonstrators off the streets. Though homeless people were exempt from curfew orders, volunteers helped about 200 unsheltered persons to take up residence at an unoccupied Sheraton Hotel in the city's Midtown neighborhood. After several overdoses, one death, acts of violence, and fires, occupants of the hotel were evicted by the hotel's owner. Volunteers subsequently helped to establish an encampment in the city's Powderhorn Park. The growth of the Powderhorn Park encampment and related safety issues resulted in controversy, and by July 2020 the Minneapolis Park and Recreation Board had established a permit process to restrict the size of camps.

By mid July 2020, the situation was described as having grown out of control; encampments had spread to unpermitted park sites and other locations throughout the city. Like the camp at Powderhorn Park, many other camp sites experienced shootings, rampant drug use, sexual assaults, sex trafficking, and other safety issues. The city's social programs attempted to connect people experiencing homelessness with services, including establishing three new shelters, but shelter beds remained available during the project. City officials adopted a de-escalation strategy for disbanding camps due to the ongoing civil unrest, and when they attempted to remove tents at non-permitted sites, they faced opposition from the "sanctuary movement" and protest groups.

Encampments appeared at 44 park sites during the summer months, according to the park board, or at as many as 55 park sites, according to news media reports. Park board officials set a deadline to close all encampments by October 2020, and then shifted the deadline due to concerns over the onset of winter weather. Fifty-three tents remained at three encampments by early December 2020, as some encampment residents declined available shelter space. It was not until January 7, 2021 that the last official encampment, located at Minnehaha Park, was closed.

== Background ==
=== Minneapolis Park and Recreation Board ===
The Minneapolis Park and Recreation Board is an elected, semi-autonomous local agency that governs the city's park system. Residents in the city elect nine park board commissioners, from six park districts and three at-large, to four-year terms. In 2017, voters elected Chris Meyer (District 1), Kale Severson (District 2), AK Hassan (District 3), Jono Cowgill (District 4), Steffanie Musich (District 5), and Brad Bourn (District 6) to district seats, and they elected Meg Forney, LaTrisha Vetaw, and Londel French to at-large seats. The commissioners elected Cowgill as their board president and Vetaw as their vice president. In 2019, the park board commissioners selected Al Bangoura as the park's superintendent to lead a staff of 580 full-time and 1,500 part-time employees, manage an annual budgetary resources of $125 million, and oversee the Minneapolis Park Police Department, a separate law enforcement entity from the Minneapolis Police Department. By the 2020s, the Minneapolis park system had been consistently considered among the most well-regarded in the United States.

=== Homelessness in Minnesota ===
A study by the Amherst H. Wilder Foundation, a Saint Paul-based non-profit organization, counted 11,371 people in Minnesota were experiencing homelessness on one night in October 2018. Wilder also estimated that nearly 19,600 people experienced homelessness on any given night in the state, and that a total of 50,600 experienced homelessness in Minnesota at some point during 2018. Black and American Indian people were disproportionately affected. Approximately 66% of those homeless in Minnesota were estimated to be People of Color. Hennepin County estimated in 2019 that it had 10,000 experiencing homeless with 4,000 of them in its largest city, Minneapolis, and it had as many as 800 people living on the street in the county. A report by the Howard Center for Investigative Journalism said by that January 2020 there were 642 people who were unsheltered in Minneapolis, an increase from 603 the prior year and five-fold increase from 2015.

=== COVID-19 pandemic in Minnesota ===
The first confirmed case in Minnesota of SARS-CoV-2, the virus causing the coronavirus disease, was reported on March 1, 2020. After detecting the first confirmed case of community spread of SARS-CoV-2 in the state, Governor Tim Walz announced the first of several executive orders to address the COVID-19 pandemic in Minnesota. On March 16, 2020, Executive Order 20-04 closed all non-essential businesses and services until March 27, 2020; subsequent orders required state residents to shelter in place and extended the timeframe for statewide closures for schools and non-essential services. On March 23, 2020, Executive Order 20-14 suspended home evictions during the pandemic. On May 13, 2020, Executive Order 20-55 prohibited sweeps or disbandment of homeless encampments.

=== Civil disorder in Minneapolis ===
Protest emerged on May 26, 2020, in Minneapolis as a response to murder of George Floyd, a 46-year-old African-American man who died on May 25 after Minneapolis police officer Derek Chauvin knelt on Floyd's neck for several minutes during an arrest. Over a three-night period from May 27 to May 29, Minneapolis sustained extraordinary damage from rioting and looting—largely along a 5-mile (8.0 km) stretch of Lake Street south of downtown—including the demise of the city's third police precinct building, which was overrun by demonstrators and set on fire. By early June 2020, approximately 1,300 properties in Minneapolis were damaged by the rioting and looting, of which nearly 100 of which were entirely destroyed.

== Timeline ==
=== "Camp quarantine" ===
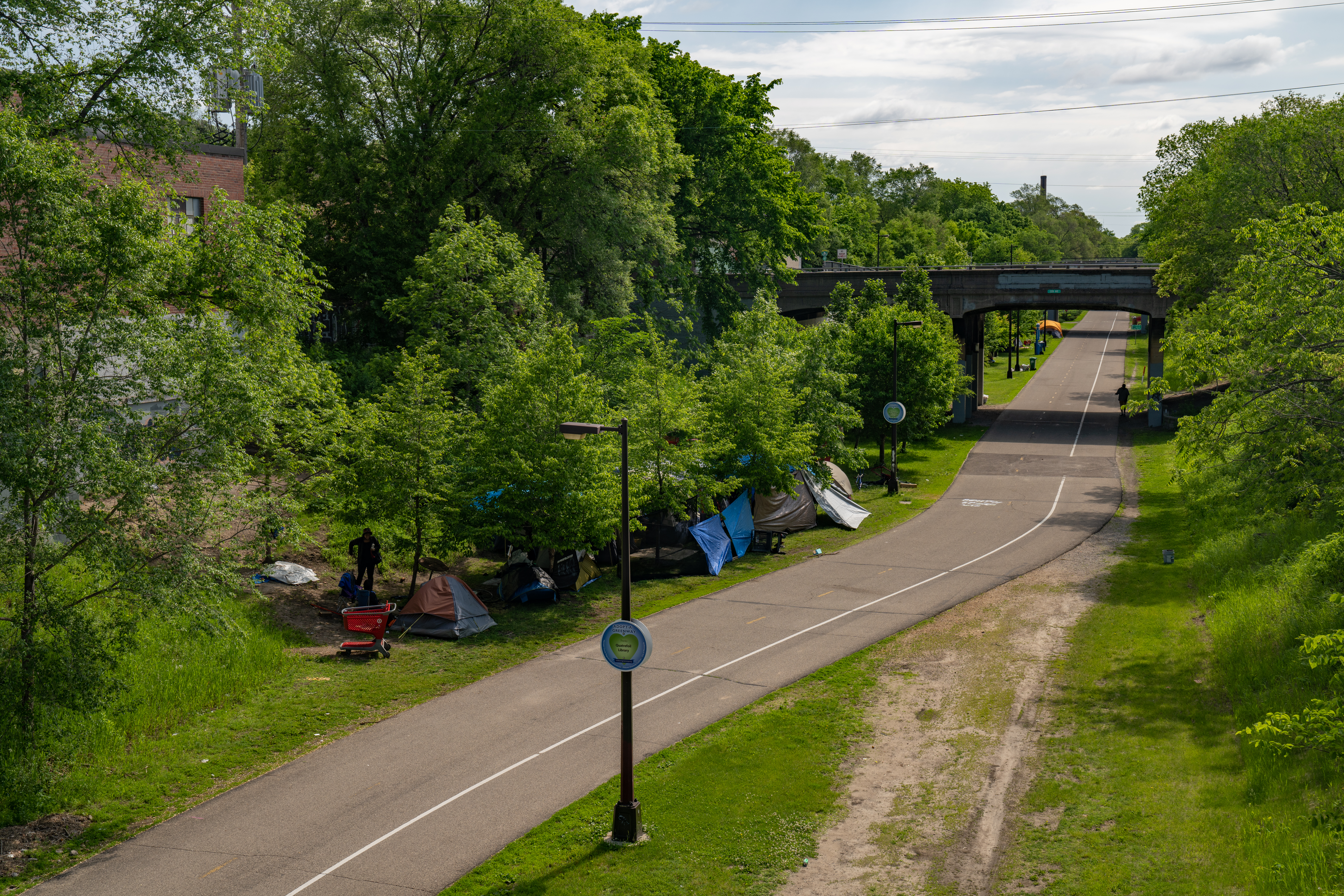
Encampment on the Midtown Greenway, May 30, 2020.

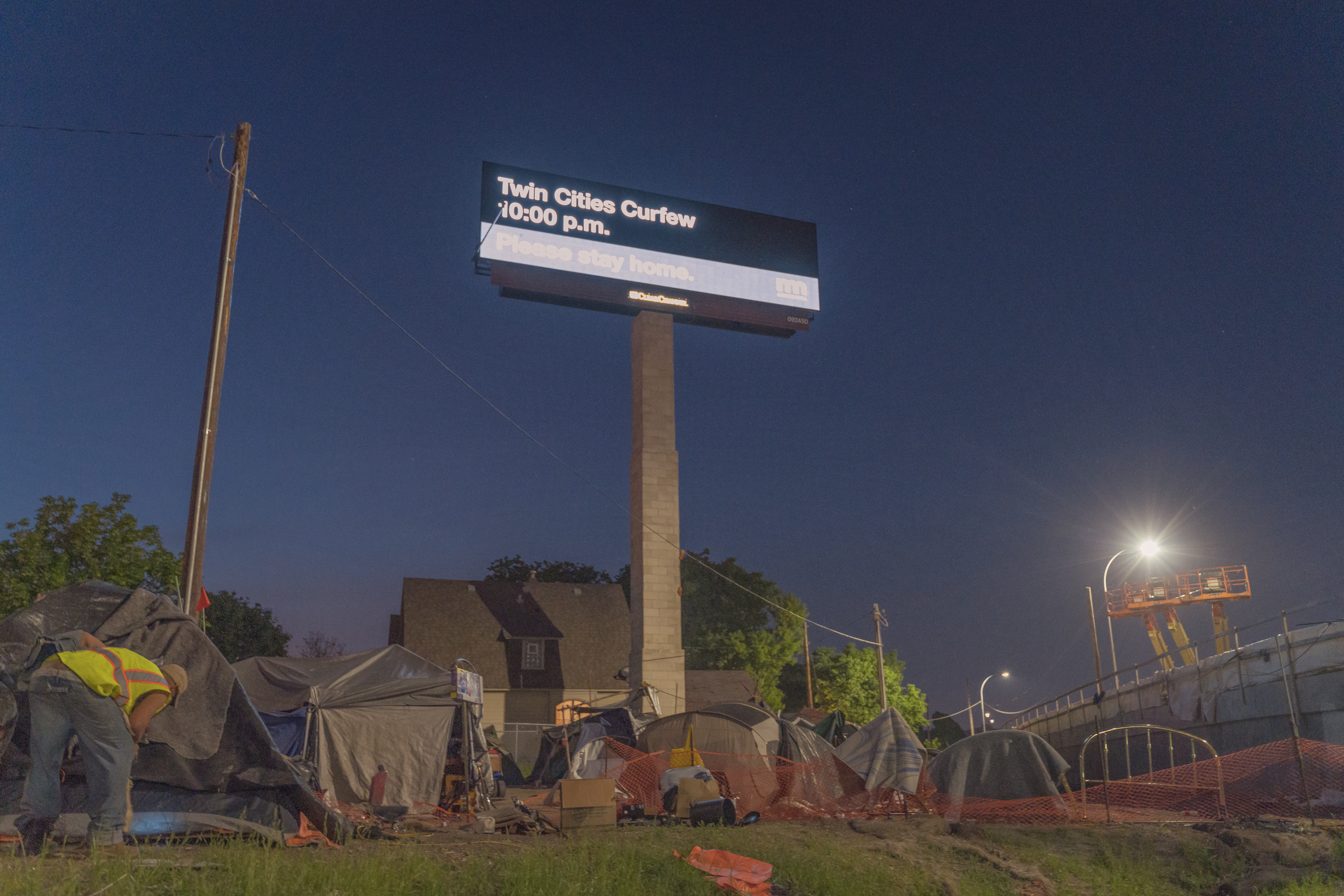
Curfew notice above an encampment near 1st Avenue South and the Midtown Greenway, June 1, 2020.

In early April 2020, several people experiencing homelessness took up residence at a small encampment under the Martin Olav Sabo Bridge, near Hiawatha Avenue and the Midtown Greenway bike and pedestrian trail. The encampment garnered the nickname "camp quarantine". Residents felt that they were safer from the coronavirus outside on public property than in crowded shelters, and the places they had previously visited during the day, such as libraries and public buildings, were closed due to the state's public health mitigation of COVID-19.

By May of 2020, with fears of the coronavirus on the rise, and 40 cases being reported in homeless shelters, the encampment grew to approximately 100 residents. An initial emergency executive order by Governor Tim Walz emboldened those dwelling at the encampment as it prohibited local government agencies from closing camps. To limit growth of the camp, Metro Transit officials erected a fence around it, but declined to clear the camp fearing that action might pose greater health and safety risk. Officials also wanted to avoid repeat of the "Wall of the Forgotten Natives," a sprawling encampment in 2018 along a Hiawatha Avenue sound barrier that had near-daily occurrences of overdoses and violence. Walz's revised executive order in early May 2020 allowed encampments to be cleared if they "reached a size or statutes" and posed a health and safety risk to people living there.

On May 25, 2020, George Floyd, an unarmed Black man, died while being pinned to the ground by Derek Chauvin, a White Minneapolis policer who knelt on Floyd's neck as he pled for his life and lost consciousness. Video of Floyd's murder quickly circulated in the media. Protests that emerged on May 26 were initially peaceful, but devolved over the next several days into widespread rioting and looting. The rioting was largely concentrated on East Lake Street. Many businesses closed and boarded up their windows and doors to prevent looting and property destruction.

On May 28, 2020, Governor Walz activated the Minnesota State Patrol and the Minnesota National Guard to restore order in Minneapolis and Saint Paul, in what would become its largest deployment since World War II. On May 29, 2020, Walz imposed a metropolitan-wide curfew to keep people off the streets from the hours of 8:00 p.m. to 6:00 a.m., and Minneapolis Mayor Jacob Frey issued an overlapping city curfew to align with the governor's order. Those breaking curfew faced fines of up to $1,000 or 90 days in jail. Curfews were enforced with mass arrests, including of several journalists, and groups of demonstrators were fired upon by state patrol officers with less-lethal rounds. The curfew orders were originally intended to last two nights, but were extended due to continued unrest. As until nights grew calmer, the curfews finally ended on June 5, 2020.

People experiencing homelessness were exempt from curfew orders, but worries grew that residents of encampments could be swept up in the unrest and potentially shot at with rubber bullets and tear gas. A non-profit organization helped approximately 70 people from the Hiawatha Avenue encampment move to a hotel outside Minneapolis, but some residents remained behind in the encampment, many of whom would eventually make their way to an activist-led shelter at the Sheraton Midtown Hotel.

=== "Sanctuary hotel" ===
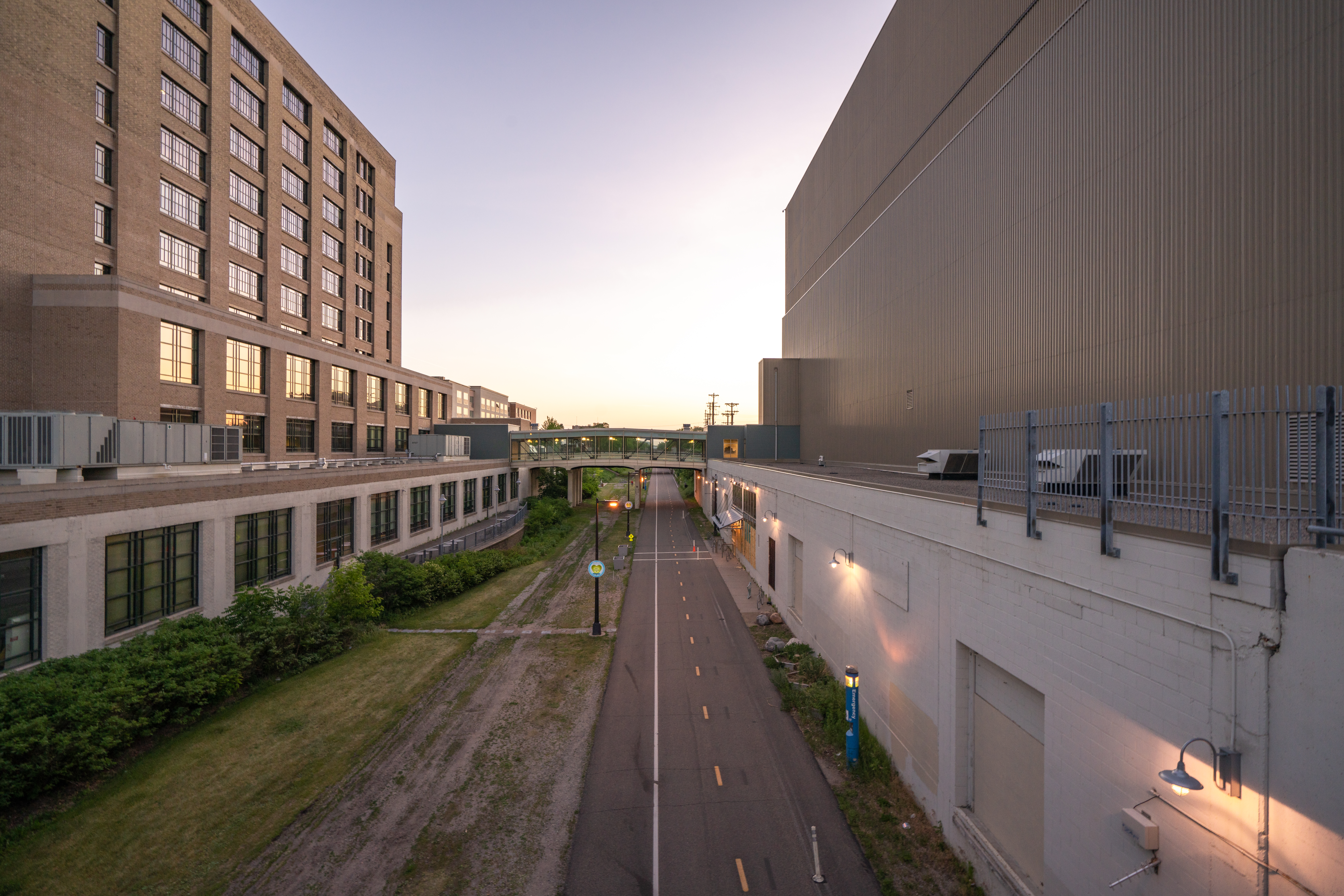
The Midtown Sheraton Hotel, at left, abutting the Midtown Greenway trail in Minneapolis, June 16, 2020.

In 2020, the Sheraton Minneapolis Midtown Hotel was a four-story, 136-room hotel located on Chicago Avenue in the Midtown neighborhood of Minneapolis, abutting the Midtown Greenway bike and pedestrian trail, and located a block north of East Lake Street. Owned by Jay Patel since February of that year, the hotel was a franchise of the international Sheraton Hotel chain.

==== Activists occupy the hotel ====
On the night of May 30, 2020, as protests and riots spread in Minneapolis after Floyd's murder, Patel evacuated guests from the hotel. His insurance company would no longer cover the hotel building if people continued to occupy it.

Activists who worked with unhoused people, and were backed by donations from an anonymous person, negotiated to buy a block of rooms for people displaced by the unrest. In agreeing to pay for the rooms, they suggested to Patel that he convince the insurance company that the hotel was taken over by activists without permission. They also said they would help protect the building from arson and looting that had occurred in the area the previous nights. After receiving approval from Patel, the hotel quickly filled to capacity, with approximately 190 people who had previously been staying at encampments. As many as 150 volunteers worked shifts to serve food, clean rooms, and operate the hotel, and they gave they project the monikers "sanctuary hotel" and "share-a-ton".

Many volunteers knew each other from prior housing advocacy work in the area. It was reported that although they were excited for an experimental project that was free of government restrictions, they were concerned that managing the project would be challenging. Some organizers believed that government agencies would ultimately take over the project. The volunteers at the hotel mostly consisted of White, middle-class activists, but included social service and health care workers. Many of the hotel residents suffered from addiction or mental illness.

The sanctuary was a place of refuge for unsheltered people displaced by the riots on East Lake Street, as well as an attempt at police abolition—volunteers believed that residents could police themselves without traditional law enforcement. By the time that the sanctuary hotel's occupancy had reached its height, the police abolition movement in Minneapolis had taken hold. Several local agencies, including the Minneapolis Park and Recreation Board, had formally dissolved their relationships with the city's police department. Nine of the thirteen members of the city's council pledged to dismantle the Minneapolis Police Department at a large rally in Powderhorn Park on June 7. Volunteer workers and residents at the hotel pledged not to call law enforcement or even to allow police officers inside the hotel.

==== Eviction and closure ====
The vandalized Sheraton Hotel in Minneapolis, June 12, 2020.

After about a week, the situation in the hotel had descended into chaos, with sexual assaults, sex trafficking, armed drug trafficking, rampant drug use, vandalism, violence, and fires. There were at least four overdoses and one death during the sanctuary occupation. Many of the volunteers did not have experience working with vulnerable populations and they were also overwhelmed by the number of people staying there. By June 10, it was estimated that 200 to 300 people were living at the hotel.

After hotel rooms filled up, people started sleeping in the lobby, the hallways, and conference rooms. Neighbors reported that the lack of controlled entry had resulted in people coming in and departing the hotel at all hours of the day. Some who came to the hotel used it as a place to run commercial sex work and drug dealing operations. There were numerous 9-1-1 calls for gunfire, sex trafficking, and drug dealing. Those living in nearby apartments reported seeing rooftop gunfire and fires.

The hotel owner said on June 9 that residents of the hotel would be evicted, and residents began moving out. Volunteers formally ended their work at the hotel. Volunteers supplied camping equipment to some residents and helped them move to camps at Powderhorn Park and the Peavy Field city park. Though all volunteers left, sanctuary movement organizers said that the hotel sanctuary would not be closing, and other residents stayed behind. Minneapolis police and community groups had cleared the hotel of its last residents by June 15. A leader of MAD DADS, a local community non-profit that sought to prevent drug abuse, said, "It was just uninhabitable. Broken glass, needles everywhere. People were being abused and all kinds of drug use. It was dangerous for families to be in here."

Hennepin County outreach workers who stayed at the hotel helped people to find indoor shelter options. The sanctuary movement led some residents to Powderhorn Park, where they pitched several tents. The owner of the hotel did not accept any of the money that volunteers had offered to pay for the rooms.

==== Aftermath ====
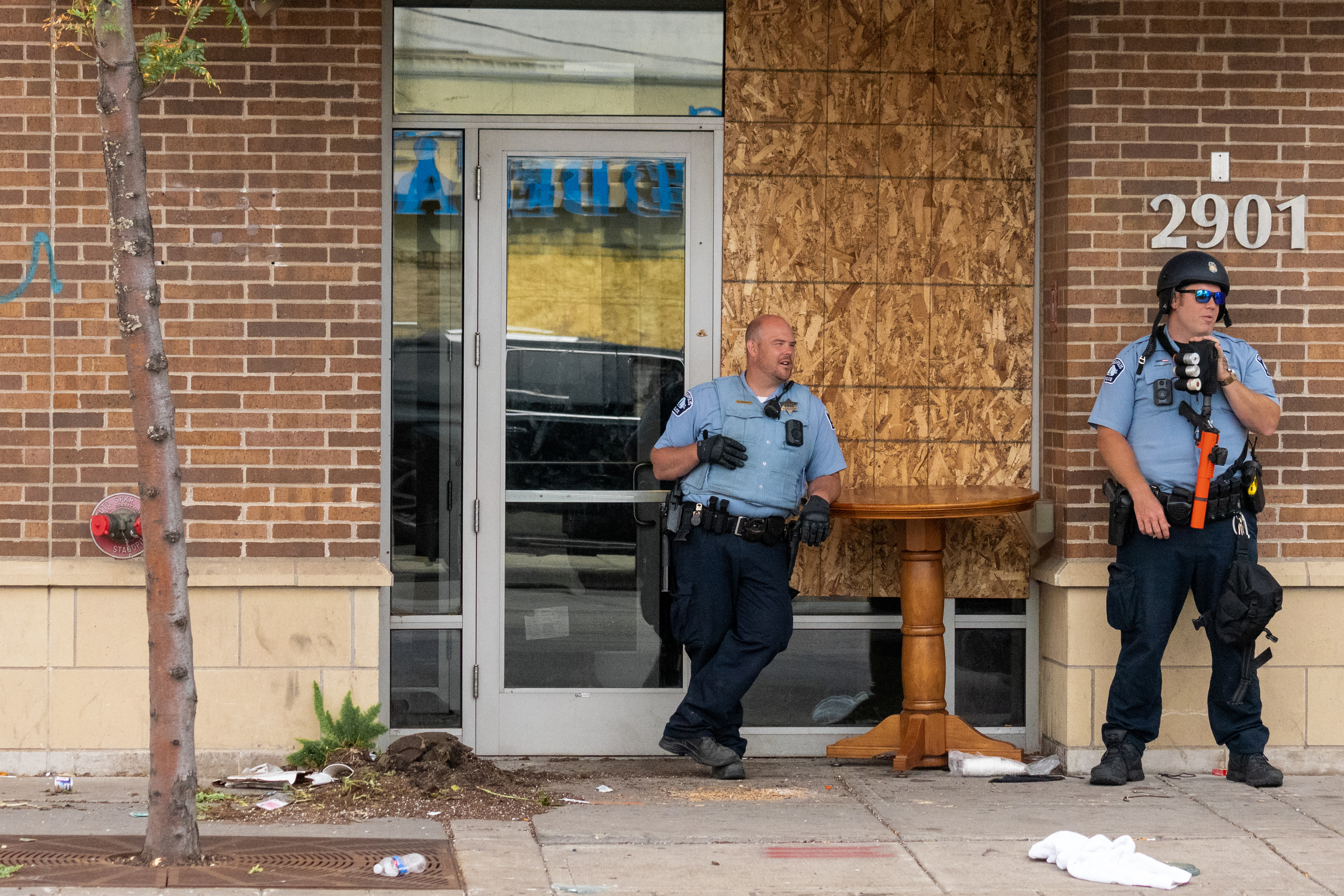
Minneapolis police guarding the Sheraton Hotel, June 15, 2020

The Midtown Sheraton Hotel experiment became a source of controversy. Progressive magazine Mother Jones described the hotel experiment as a "utopian sanctuary". Far right-wing commentators at Gateway Pundit characterized events at the hotel as a "Marxist" movement of rioters and squatters and largely reported on acts of vandalism there. One resident described the hotel environment as "chaotic and unruly". MplsStPaul magazine described the situation as having "disintegrated into a disaster—the hotel was overrun with rampant drug use and sex trafficking".

Prior to the eviction of residents at the Sheraton Hotel, organizers had admitted that they were ill-equipped to manage the situation and had made public pleas for government agencies to take over. Organizers of the hotel experiment were criticized, as well as the project's unintended outcomes. Social service providers and organizers of other homeless camps in the city noted the lack of security to control entry, the inexperienced volunteers, and the lack of oversight of resident activities. The sanctuary movement at the Sheraton Midtown Hotel was also criticized for being a predominately White-led volunteer effort, especially since many of the residents were Black or American Indian. Some volunteers at the hotel felt that the effort had inadvertently harmed many of the people they were trying to serve. As residents were being evicted from the Sheraton Midtown Hotel in early June, activists tried to enlist the help of local social justice advocacy group Black Visions Collective, but volunteer organizers felt that the move had come too late and ultimately had not helped the project succeed.

=== Park encampments ===
==== Powderhorn Park ====
Powderhorn Park is a 66-acre (27 ha) city park in Powderhorn Park, a residential neighborhood in Minneapolis. It is managed by the Minneapolis Park and Recreation Board. An encampment emerged at the park on June 10. Though social service providers attempted to connect people staying at the Sheraton Midtown Hotel with housing options, the sanctuary movement volunteers helped them to form a 10-tent encampment on Powderhorn Park property. At the time, the superintendent of the park board, Al Bangoura, expressed concern that the violence and other problems that occurred at the hotel would also occur at the park. By June 12, the encampment had more than doubled to 25 tents, with approximately 18 people living there. The park board issued an eviction order. The park, however, was not cleared, as the office of Governor Walz intervened and prohibited officials from disbanding it. Some park board members also said the encampment should remain.

Less than one week later, the number of tents had increased to 50, and a satellite encampment had appeared on the other side of the park as more people were being transported from the Sheraton Midtown Hotel to the park via Metro buses. Volunteers, who were unaware that buses would be dropping off more people at the park encampment, were worried that the influx of new residents would be disruptive to the culture they had established there. Dozens of unsheltered people soon arrived, who had been staying at other hotels paid for by donations to the hotel sanctuary project. As the Powderhorn Park encampment quickly grew, outreach workers worried that the much larger encampment would overwhelm volunteers and become too dangerous for the people living there.

==== Uncontrolled growth and safety issues ====
The Powderhorn encampment had grown to 180 tents by June 17. The park board met that night and passed a resolution to allow people to seek refuge in city parks. The board also committed to working with social service providers to identify long-term housing options for encampment residents. The encampment situation, however, quickly grew out of the control of park board officials. By the end of June, there were 400 total tents between two encampments, and 44 encampments had emerged at other parks across the city, some with as many as 300 residents. The park board reported later that many encampment residents had come from outside of Minneapolis to live in the parks.

Numerous sexual assaults, fights, and acts of drug abuse took place at Powderhorn Park, generating alarm from nearby residents and city officials. Minneapolis city counselor Alondra Cano had called a community meeting to discuss the encampment, but cancelled it out of safety concerns. A planned voter registration drive by the Democratic-Farmer-Labor party which had been scheduled for June 19 was also canceled, as the park was not considered safe for volunteers. A juvenile was sexually assaulted at the encampment during the overnight hours on June 26. The sexual assault of a woman was reported at the encampment on June 28. Another juvenile was sexually assaulted on July 4. Seven other crimes were reported at the encampment between July 5 and July 13.

By mid July the sprawling encampment at Powderhorn Park had grown to 560 tents with an estimated 800 people living there.

==== Permit process established ====
On July 14, Governor Walz signed an executive order that modified the eviction moratorium to allow local governments to disband camps for safety concerns, illegal activity, and property damage.

After facing pressure from residents living near Powderhorn Park, the park board created a permit process to restrict the size and growth of camps, a major departure from their decision a month prior to allow people to seek refuge on park property. The park board resolution passed on July 16, restricting the number of camps on park property to 20 with a maximum of 25 tents each. Park encampments were to be prohibited within a certain distance of schools, and permitted encampments required buffer zones in order to ensure that park visitors were kept safe. The resolution also required organizations to sponsor and obtain permits; otherwise, the encampments risked being disbanded and the residents removed. The permits did not have a specified end date, but the resolution called for progress towards moving encampment residents to shelters and other housing options.

The first permitted encampment opened at Lake Harriet, and others soon followed. By early August, the park board had estimated that there were 413 tents across 38 city parks, but local media reported that encampments were noticed at more than 55 parks, with only the four park sites of Lake Harriet, Marshall Terrace Park, The Mall, and Bde Maka Ska at William Berry Park having obtained permits. A permit was later granted for an encampment outside Theodore Wirth House, the superintendent's home residence and historic park administration building. The park board also designated a dozen other parks where permits would be allowed if organizations applied for permits: Boom Island, Riverside, Annie Young, BF Nelson, Franklin Steele, Minnehaha Falls, Lyndale Farmstead, Martin Luther King Jr., Bryn Mawr, Beltrami, Logan, and Lake Nokomis parks.

==== Closure of Powderhorn Park encampments ====
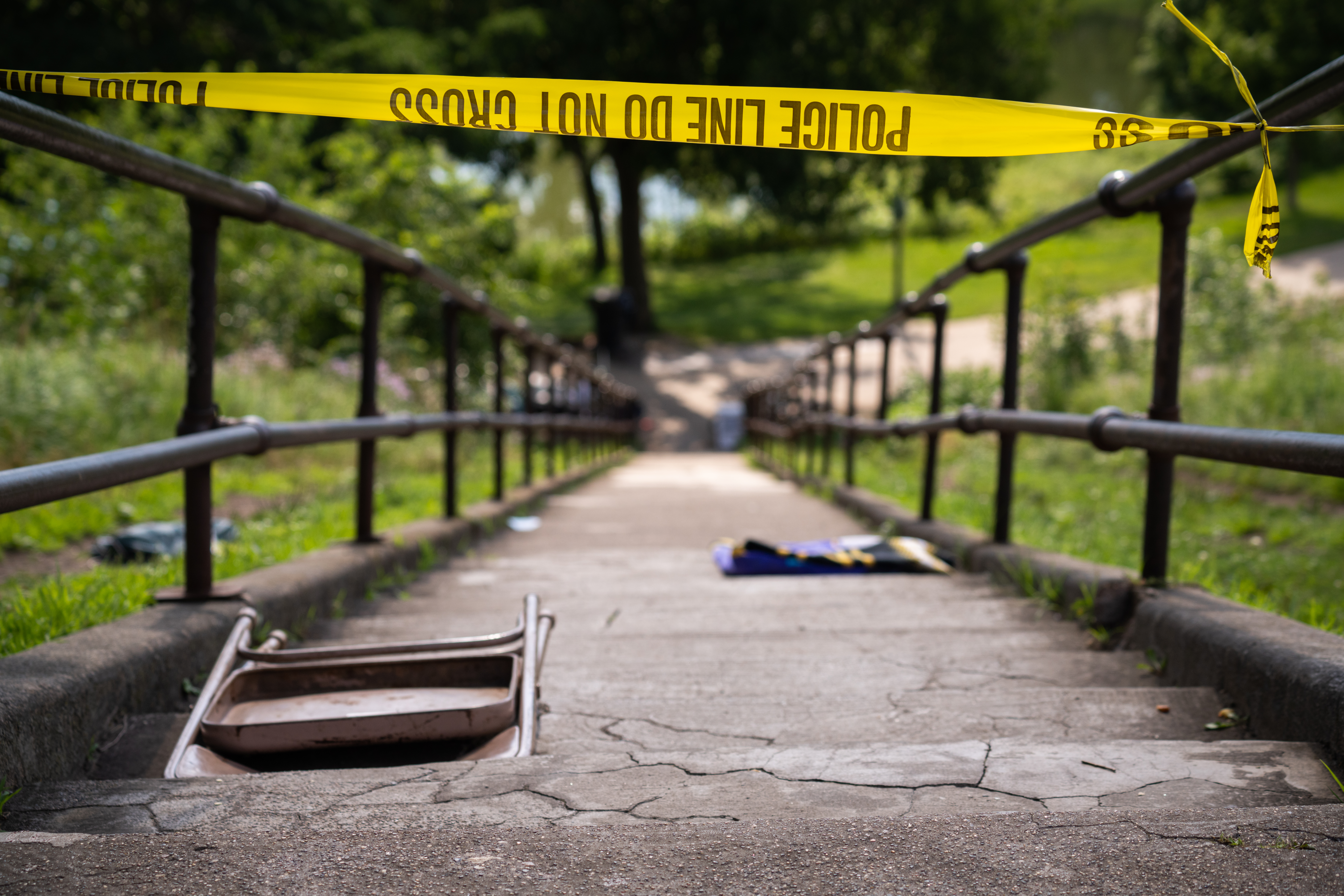
Police Line Do Not Cross tape at Powderhorn Park, July 20, 2020

Following a revision to state executive orders on evictions and the permit process that they established, the park board began closing one of the two encampments at Powderhorn Park in late July. City outreach teams worked to connect residents with shelter options. Some displaced Powderhorn Park residents moved to other campsites in the city, but many refused to leave. The encampment was the source of continued violent crime and drug overdoses. From July 15 to early August, thirteen additional violent crimes were reported at Powderhorn Park, including multiple assaults, a rape, arson, and injuries from gunfire. The park board moved to close the site and gave residents two weeks to decide between a shelter or being moved to other encampments in the city that had permits, with the city providing transportation. Some residents chose to stay. The park board cleared the 35 remaining tents at Powderhorn Park on August 14, as police faced off with protesters and fired pepper spray, and made two arrests of demonstrators.

At its peak, the Powderhorn Park encampment was considered the largest in the history of the Twin Cities, having 560 tents, with an estimated 800 people living it by the end of July. However, there was no agreed upon count of the number of people living at the camp. The park board published a count of the number of tents at Powderhorn Park that it updated daily; the count peaked at about 570 in July. People observing the encampment said there were approximately 1.5 to 1.75 people per tent, with a possible total of over 800 residents. Others said that individual encampment residents had multiple tents and put the person count closer to 250. A separate report by the Howard Center for Investigative Journalism said as many as 700 tents were at Powderhorn Park by July.

==== Unpermitted encampments ====
By early August several unpermitted encampments in parks had emerged at Loring, Logan, Lake Nokomis, Elliot, Matthews, Beltrami, and Boom Island, among other sites. Social service providers expressed concern that the expansion of encampments was diverting unhoused people away from shelters and more-stable housing options. Some park board members expressed frustration that encampments at Peavey, Powderhorn Park, Kenwood, and Elliot Parks—which had several reported safety and health issues—were not disbanded. In particular, the unpermitted encampment that emerged at Kenwood park drew concern from neighbors due to is proximity to a school and other safety incidents, such as when police responded to an indecent exposure incident by a man and a fight resulted in several arrests, and the 10-tent encampment was later relocated to another section of the same park. A Star Tribune editorial on August 14 said that "Allowing the camps to grow and attract so much illegal activity has endangered not only neighbors and park users, but also the homeless campers themselves. Some of them became victims of criminals, even after they had moved to the camps believing they would be safer outside than in shelters."

Unpermitted encampments were later cleared at Elliot, Kenwood, Matthews, and Loring parks, among others. Some residents were transferred to Franklin Steele Park or other encampment sites.

==== Peavy Field Park ====
In late June, an unpermitted encampment emerged at Peavy Field Park, a 7-acre (2.8 ha) youth recreation area and playground in the city's Ventura Village, that drew criticism for safety concerns. The encampment violated the park board's permit resolution as it was located adjacent to the K-12 Hope Academy school that shared the park grounds. On July 1, a teenager was shot multiple times outside the Peavy Park encampment. On July 16, two people were wounded by gunshots at the encampment. On August 11, thirty-five gunshot rounds were fired in Peavy Park, but no one was injured. School staff, parents, and students from K-12 Hope Academy requested the park board clear the encampment so that students could safety return to using the park equipment and fields when school would resume in early September.

The park board issued vacate notices for those staying at the 12-tent encampment on August 10 and attempted to connect those staying there with shelters and social services over the following weeks. Protesters, however, initially blocked officials from clearing the camp. On September 24, the park board disbanded the camp for the five remaining people staying there and cleared the park of abandoned tents, hypodermic needles, and biohazard materials. A group of demonstrators gathered outside the Hennepin County Government Center building in downtown Minneapolis the night of September 24 to protest the encampment's closure. Law enforcement authorities made five arrests of demonstrators; none of those arrested had been staying at the encampment.

==== "Wall of Forgotten Natives" ====
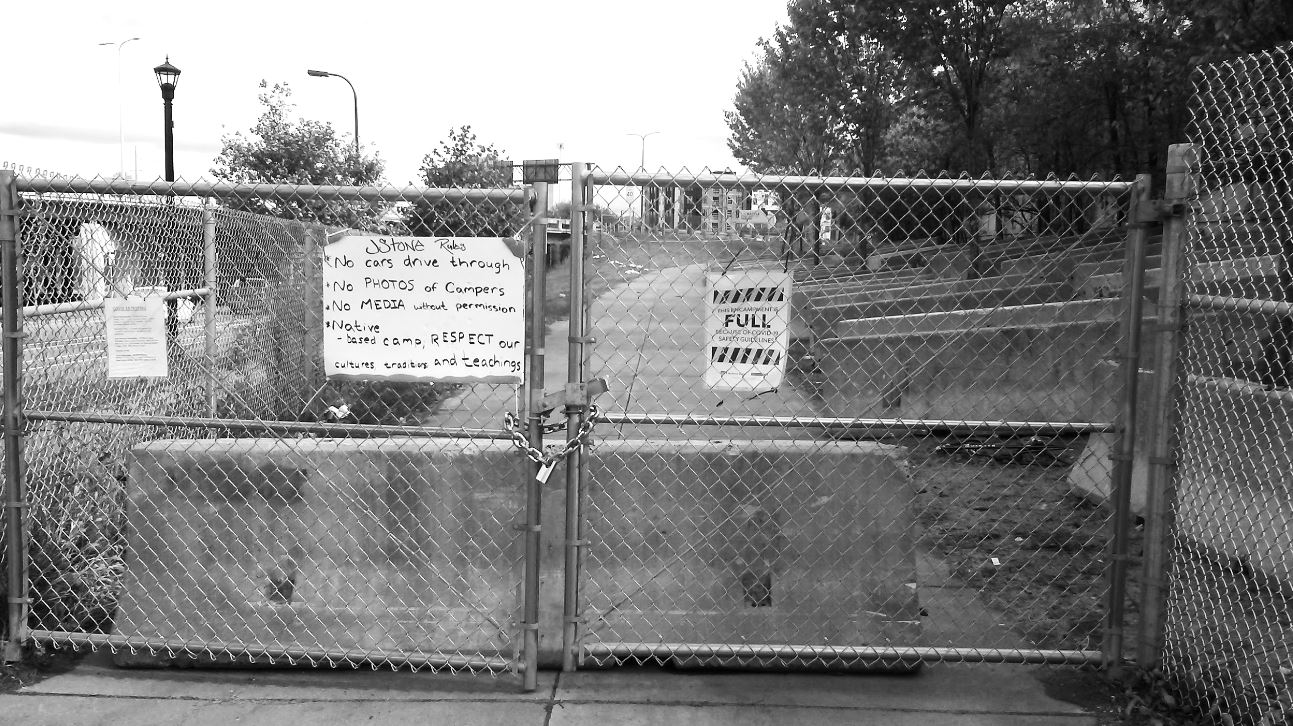
Franklin-Hiawatha encampment north gate, October 1, 2020.

On September 3, 2020, a group backed by protesters and American Indian Movement advocates re-occupied a site they referred to as the "Wall of Forgotten Natives," near Hiawatha and Franklin avenues in Minneapolis. The site on Little Earth Trail along Minnesota State Highway 55/Hiawatha Avenue had been barricaded by the state in 2018, when an encampment closed after experiencing drug overdoses, disease, violence, fires, and deaths. The Highway 55 encampment had been linked to four deaths in 2018. In September 2020, reoccupation of the encampment with 40 tents came after the city closed another encampment at Phillips Park on 13th Avenue South due to health and safety concerns, and after officials sought help from nonprofit organizations to house residents. Reestablishment of the Hiawatha encampment also came during a time of increasing confrontation between Minneapolis officials and homeless advocates, as the city had hoped to close all encampments by October 2020. State patrol officers did not intervene when a group cut locks to enter the fenced-off area. Though the city and county had allocated $8 million for three new shelters, including a Native-specific one, advocates were unsatisfied with the response by local officials to the needs of Native homeless persons, and established the camp.

==== Decline of encampments ====
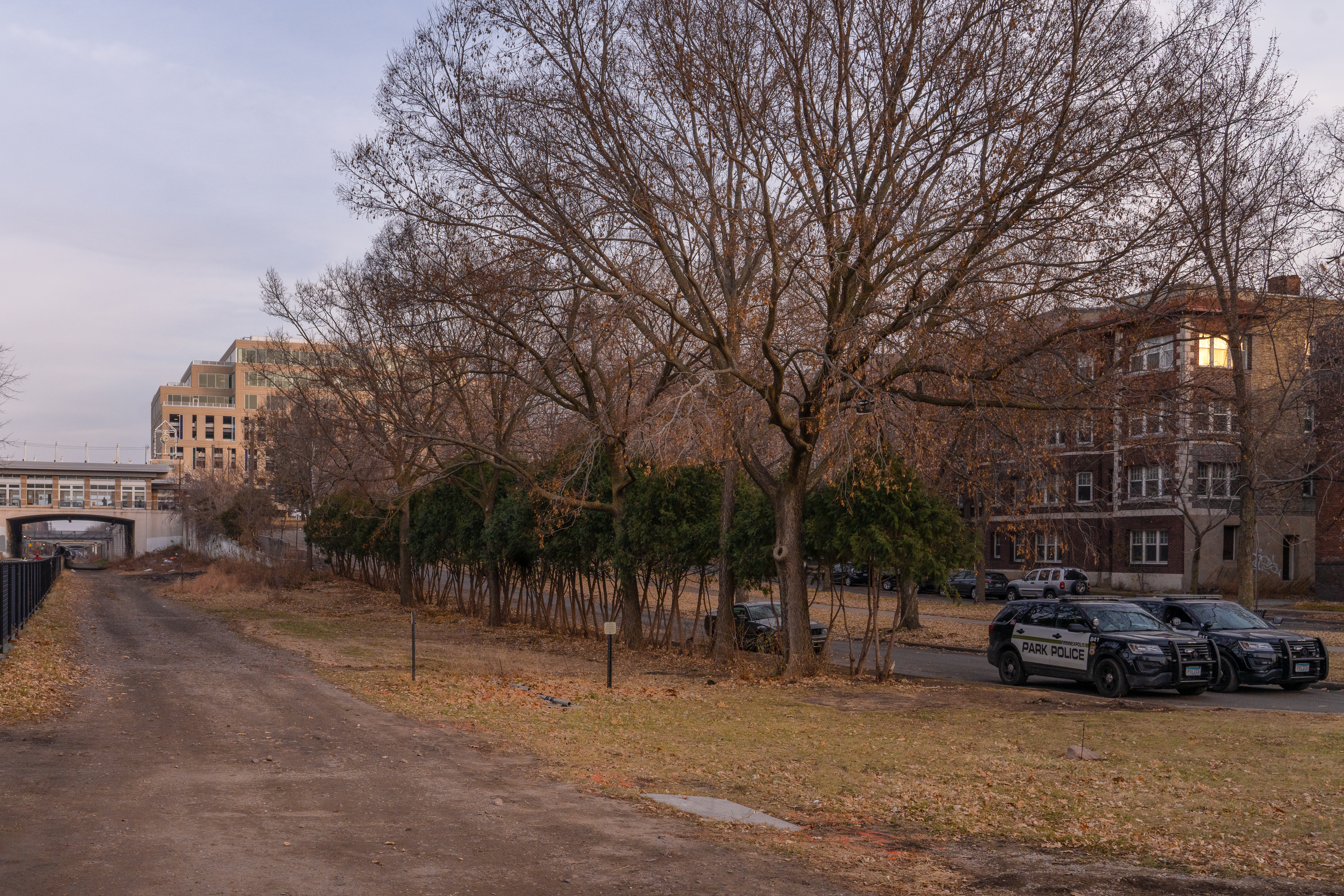
Minneapolis Park Police Department officers patrol The Mall on December 10, 2020, after clearing the encampment.

The number of people residing in encampments declined as the city moved more people to shelters and hotels. The number of encampments in city parks fell from more than 40 in August to more than 20 by September. Encampments with permits remained in 15 city parks by late September. The park board estimated that there were 222 tents in city parks as of October 15. City officials said they did not have an exact deadline to close encampments, but they said they intended to help connect encampment residents to shelters and close all camps before the onset of cold weather.

In October, the Mid-Minnesota Legal Aid and the American Civil Liberties Union filed a federal lawsuit to prevent closure of homeless encampments in city parks, but it was dismissed by U.S. District Judge Wilhelmina Wright. By the end of November, the park board issued vacate notices for the encampment at The Mall Park along the Midtown Greenway due to several fires, injuries, overdoses, and other violent crimes that were reported there.

In early December, fifty-three tents remained across three encampments: Minnehaha Park, Rev. Dr. Martin Luther King, Jr. Park, and The Mall Park. Outreach workers were unable to convince some residents to move to available shelter space. On December 10, the park board closed the encampment at The Mall Park, citing health and safety issues, and seven of the eight people residing there declined shelter assistance offered by Hennepin County.

==== Homicide in Minnehaha Park ====
By the end of 2020, the only remaining encampment was at Minnehaha Park, a 167-acre (68 ha) regional park that was among the city's oldest parks and had attracted many tourists and visitors due to its famed waterfall and creek gorge. On December 31, park board officials issued vacate notices to those staying there, effective on January 3, 2021. Officials provided encampment residents with five short-term shelter options, but some residents chose to stay at the camp. Activists vowed to protest if residents were evicted and argued that those staying at the encampment had been relatively peaceful, and that they should be allowed to stay. On January 3, 2021, Minneapolis police recovered the body of the 38-year old Sedric L. Dorman inside a tent at the Minnehaha Park encampment. Dorman's death was ruled a homicide, the city's first in 2021, from the multiple stab wounds he sustained early that afternoon.

==== Closure of encampments ====
Citing "documented health and safety concerns", the park board closed the Minnehaha Park encampment, the last remaining one in city parks, on January 7, 2021.

== Activism and protests ==
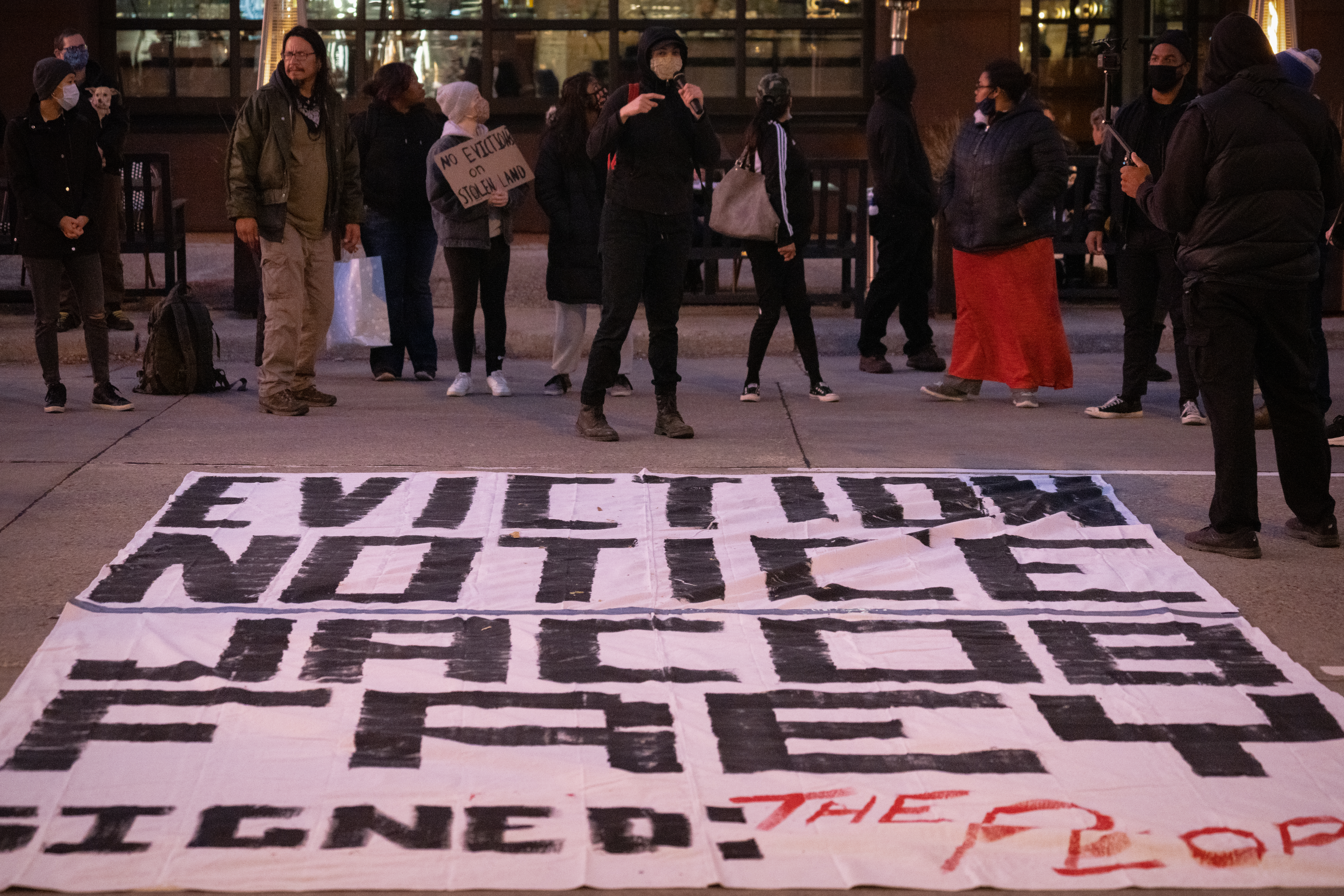
Protest march, November 2, 2020

Some who volunteered at encampments were motivated to seek justice on social issues following the murder of George Floyd. The Minneapolis Sanctuary Movement, one of the organizations coordinating activities at the Sheraton Midtown Hotel and Powderhorn Park encampment, described themselves as a "community care experiment fighting for housing justice, abolition, and land reclamation, and supporting the most impacted people to take the lead". MplsStPaul magazine described the dynamic as having "lines blurred between sanctuary and rogue activists", who used the circumstances of encampment residents to advance for an agenda of social and racial justice, sometimes at the expense of the welfare of unhoused people. In a press conference on September 3, 2020, American Indian activists who had helped to re-establish the "Wall of Forgotten Natives", an encampment along Hiawatha Avenue/Highway 55, described the encampment as a reclamation of land which had belonged to Native people prior to European settlement. Some advocates believed that citizens had a right to seek refuge on public lands, and felt that the park board permitting process was not permissive enough.

Police abolition advocates viewed the Sheraton Midtown Hotel and the park encampments as a step in establishing a "police-free" city. Volunteers and residents at some encampments pledged not to call 9-1-1 or allow access to law enforcement. Some of the neighbors near the Powderhorn Park encampment, who were described in a profile by The New York Times as progressive and mostly White, also agreed to avoid calling the police. Many campsites across the city, however, featured crime and safety challenges, such as robberies, rapes, sex trafficking, assaults, drug overdoses, and shootings. Some neighbors were conflicted about calling law enforcement to respond to violence at the camps, with some instances of reluctance reportedly fueled by fears that it might subject People of Color to further trauma. Activists at Powderhorn Park encampment were criticized for not calling paramedics to treat people who overdosed on drugs, and some speculated that deaths or serious drug-related medical injuries could have been prevented had emergency services been rendered. Activists also drew criticism for not assisting law enforcement investigations of crimes at encampment sites, such as the when people refused to identify the alleged perpetrator who raped a 14-year old at the Powderhorn Park camp.

Some neighbors living close to the park encampments expressed the viewpoint that the all-volunteer at effort did not work effectively. It was also reported that many of the volunteer and resident-led meetings at encampments were contentious. At encampments, some activists resisted outside help from social service providers and government agencies, insisting that they were self-sufficient. Other volunteers felt that well-intentioned efforts had ultimately done more harm to vulnerable people. Park Board Vice President LaTrisha Vetaw characterized some of the activists at encampments as "White saviors" who were naïve to the social and economic needs of the people in the encampments. After one of the two Powderhorn Park encampments closed in mid July, a statement was released by the Minnesota Sanctuary Movement which said, "Powderhorn Sanctuary residents and volunteers have been at risk of violence not because of a failure of volunteers, but because of the lack of any coordinated response by our representatives and electeds (sic), a buildup of decades of absolute neglect in the area of dignified housing, and centuries of structural violence....Sanctuary volunteers are helping residents move as best as they are able, but the park's new permitting system is not workable, the incompetent city has no solutions, and the county and state have not accepted responsibility."

Due to the ongoing civil unrest, city officials adopted a de-escalation strategy for disbanding camps. When they attempted to remove tents at non-permitted sites, they faced opposition from the sanctuary movement and from protest groups. Even after several health and safety incidents that had drawn concern from neighborhoods, park encampment closures remained the subject of protests by non-resident activists, who blocked officials from clearing camps. Some protesters acted as "eviction defense", boarding heavy machinery that was intended to clear supplies and material from camps. Officers fired pepper spray and made several arrests. On September 5, a protest group marched from Bryant Park to the home of Al Bangoura, the park board superintendent, to protest park board actions regarding camps. A protester breached the property, climbed onto the porch roof, and spray-painted security cameras in order to obstruct surveillance. Hundreds of people protested the closure of the Powdernhorn Park camp on July 20, and about four or five people were arrested. In August, protesters blocked officials from clearing the Peavy Park encampment, which was located adjacent to a school playground and had been the location of several violent incidents.

About 100 protests gathered outside the Minnesota State Capitol building in Saint Paul in September to demand that the governor and state legislature increase public support for hotel rooms for unhoused persons and increase investment in public housing.

== Aftermath ==
=== Permitted versus unpermitted sites ===
In 2020, the park board issued permits for five encampments at Lake Harriet (up to 11 tents), Marshall Terrace Park (up to 15 tents), The Mall (up to 15 tents), William Berry Park (up to 25 tents), and outside the Theodore Wirth House. The park board designated 12 other parks as suitable locations for encampments: Annie Young Meadow, Beltrami Park, BF Nelson Park, Boom Island Park, Bryn Mawr Meadows Park, Franklin Steele Park, Lake Nokomis, Logan Park, Lyndale Farmstead Park, Minnehaha Park, Rev. Dr. Martin Luther King Jr. Park, and Riverside Park.

The park board had difficulty controlling the number and size of camps in spite of the process it had established. Encampments had spread to 40 park sites by the middle of the year. The park board reported that there were a total of 44 encampment park sites throughout 2020, while a media source reported that as many as 55 park encampments had appeared by August.

According to the park board, the encampments brought an influx of people into Minneapolis. Some people in unpermitted encampments were offered help to move to other permitted camps, but many refused. Several encampment residents declined available shelter space during the permit project. Some encampment residents said that they felt they would be threatened by activists if they tried to leave encampments, while others said that they were paid by activists to remain at encampments.

=== Public services and costs ===
The park board spent $713,856 to administer camps between June of 2020 and early January 2021, including $373,350 in Minnesota Emergency Response Funds. The park board provided portable toilets, trash containers, and stations for handwashing at camp sites. By the end of the encampment project, the park board had spent close to $1 million on costs associated with encampments and lawsuits. Some felt that the number of toilets and handwashing stations was too limited, and that this made it difficult to stop the spread of communicable diseases at camp sites. The board and park staff collaborated with several agencies to help find available shelter beds. By October 2020, officials from Hennepin County had spent $12 million to provide housing for those at serious risk of COVID-19, and a $22 million plan was proposed to allow for six additional shelter sites.

=== Health and safety issues ===
Concerns about the spread of SARS-CoV-2 in shelters were cited by some encampment residents as their main reason for staying at park sites. The park board said in July 2020 that "parks are not designed or operated in a manner that supports human habitation", and that they preferred to work with partner organizations to find housing options for those experiencing homelessness and residing in park encampments. The park board did not view the encampments as a permanent or long-term solution, citing the onset of extreme winter weather that could pose other health and safety challenges to residents living in encampments. Officials considered the park encampments to be a short-term solution which would only be necessary until people could be connected with shelters and housing.

Many encampments received notoriety for shootings, drug use, drug trafficking, sexual assaults, sex trafficking, and other safety concerns. Neighbors who lived near park encampments said that regular gunshots were heard within the vicinity of parks. Parks that had encampment sites were left littered with trash, abandoned camping equipment, hypodermic needles, and human waste. After several sexual assaults occurred at encampments, including of minors, volunteers had to move some women and children to secret, non-permitted campsites in other parts of the city. By the end of the permit period, four people had died in Minneapolis park encampments. One of the park deaths was 38-year old Sedric Dorman of Minneapolis, who was fatally stabbed inside a tent at Minnehaha Park on January 3, 2021. The Minneapolis Parks Police Department tallied 130 incidents of violent crimes such as homicide, rape, and aggravated assault in city parks during 2020 , a 41.3% increase compared to the 10-year average of 92.

=== Permits not renewed for 2021 ===
Park board commissioners passed a resolution by a 5-3 vote on February 3, 2021, to cancel encampment permits and defer to human services agencies and Hennepin County for the provision of services to unsheltered people living in parks. Park Board President Jono Cowgill and Commissioners Bourn, Forney, Meyer, and Musich voted for the resolution. Commissioners Londel French, AK Hassan, and Kale Severson voted against it. The board's resolution stated that use of encampments to shelter homeless people "is not a safe, proper, or dignified form of housing and is, at best, a temporary solution for encamped individuals", and it encouraged "the State of Minnesota, Hennepin County, and the City of Minneapolis to continue pursuit of expanded opportunities for permanent shelter for unsheltered homeless populations". The resolution revoked the authority of the park board superintendent to issue future encampment permits. At the park board's February 3 meeting, a Minneapolis resident circulated a petition to disband the independent board in lieu of city government management of parks, and blamed the park board commissioner for the violence, sexual assaults, shootings, and homicides that occurred on parkland during 2020.

=== November 2021 election ===
The prohibition of encampments on park property became a major topic of discussion for candidates seeking park board office in the November 2021 Minneapolis municipal election. The encampments became a wedge issue that divided city residents and candidates. Incumbent Londel French blamed his failed reelection bid for an at-large board seat on his stance on maintaining the Hiawatha Golf Course and his support for park encampments. Park board candidate Alicia Smith, who won an at large seat in the 2021 election, had volunteered at the Powderhorn Park encampment. Smith opposed permitting encampments in the park system, but also wanted to treat unsheltered people with dignity and respect.

Voters replaced seven of the nine commissioners, including President Jono Cowgill, who lost his seat to newcomer Elizabeth Shaffer.

== See also ==
- 2020–2021 Minneapolis–Saint Paul racial unrest
- History of Minneapolis
- List of tent cities in the United States
- Neighborhoods of Minneapolis
