= Park district =

Type of special-purpose district in the United States

In the United States, a park district is a form of local special-purpose district for providing public parks and recreation in or near its geographic boundaries. Some park districts also own or maintain related cultural facilities such as monuments, zoos, sports venues, music venues, or museums.

Park districts are prevalent in the United States. State statutes often have a general law to provide for park districts' creation, dissolution, geographic borders, and annexation; the selection of governing boards, often referred to as park boards; and the criteria for levying property taxes on behalf of the district. Park districts sometimes obtain additional revenue by charging admission fees for some venues and through donations or voluntary memberships in a similar way to not-for-profit organizations; in addition, sometimes a park district is assisted by a private not-for-profit organization set up specifically for the purpose of assisting the local public park system.

Park district jurisdiction over public recreation is usually not exclusive; other local government bodies may also have their own parks. Local government bodies besides park districts also own museums and public event venues such as arenas; in some places the main public museums are instead part of the local library district or a separate museum district. State parks and national parks, and other related state and national areas, are controlled at the level of government that created them, rather than by any local park district.

Illinois statute provides specifically for an administrative body known as the Chicago Park District, which is under the control of a "chief executive officer" appointed by the mayor of Chicago rather than a publicly elected park board as with other park districts in Illinois. Numerous cities and suburbs in Illinois have independently-elected park boards, and other regionally-elected bodies exist such as the Forest Preserve District of DuPage County and Fox Valley Park District.

Minnesota held a plebiscite in 1883 which created the independently-elected Minneapolis Park and Recreation Board.

In some states, such as Illinois, park districts are also authorized to have their own park police departments, independent of the other local police departments or state or national park police.

In Ohio, the Ohio Revised Code section 1545 provides for general park districts, often known as "metro parks", in addition to "township park districts" allowed under ORC section 511.18. Township park districts may be converted into "metro parks" by public election. Section 1545 park districts are authorized to operate their own park police as well. Park districts in Ohio are controlled by park commissioners appointed by a local judge, rather than by a publicly elected park board.

== See also ==
- Park system
- Regional park
