= Teen Teamworks =

Agency overview
- Formed: 1986
- Jurisdiction: City of Minneapolis
- Agency executive: MaryLynn Pulscher, Environmental Education Manager
- Website: www.minneapolisparks.org/activities-events/youth-programs/teen_programs/teen_teamworks/

Teen Teamworks is a youth work program of the Minneapolis Park and Recreation Board in Minneapolis, Minnesota.

Youth ages 14 to 24 serve as Teen Teamworks recruits for on-the-job training in green careers. Prior to the COVID-19 pandemic, the park system's youth employment was 917 employees, an all-time high. After a pandemic dip, employment was up to 891 in 2022.

Begun in 1986, a crew from Teen Teamworks helped to replace the palm trees in the Minneapolis Sculpture Garden conservatory, after they had grown through the roof. More recently, in 2022, a Teen Teamworks crew cleaned up exploded fireworks at Boom Island Park. The Mississippi River Green Team, a Teen Teamworks unit, worked in 2021 to remove buckthorn from the riverbank.

== Bibliography ==
- Smith, David C. (2008). City of Parks: The Story of Minneapolis Parks. Minneapolis: The Foundation for Minneapolis Parks. ISBN 978-0-615-19535-3.
