= Powder horn =

Container for gunpowder

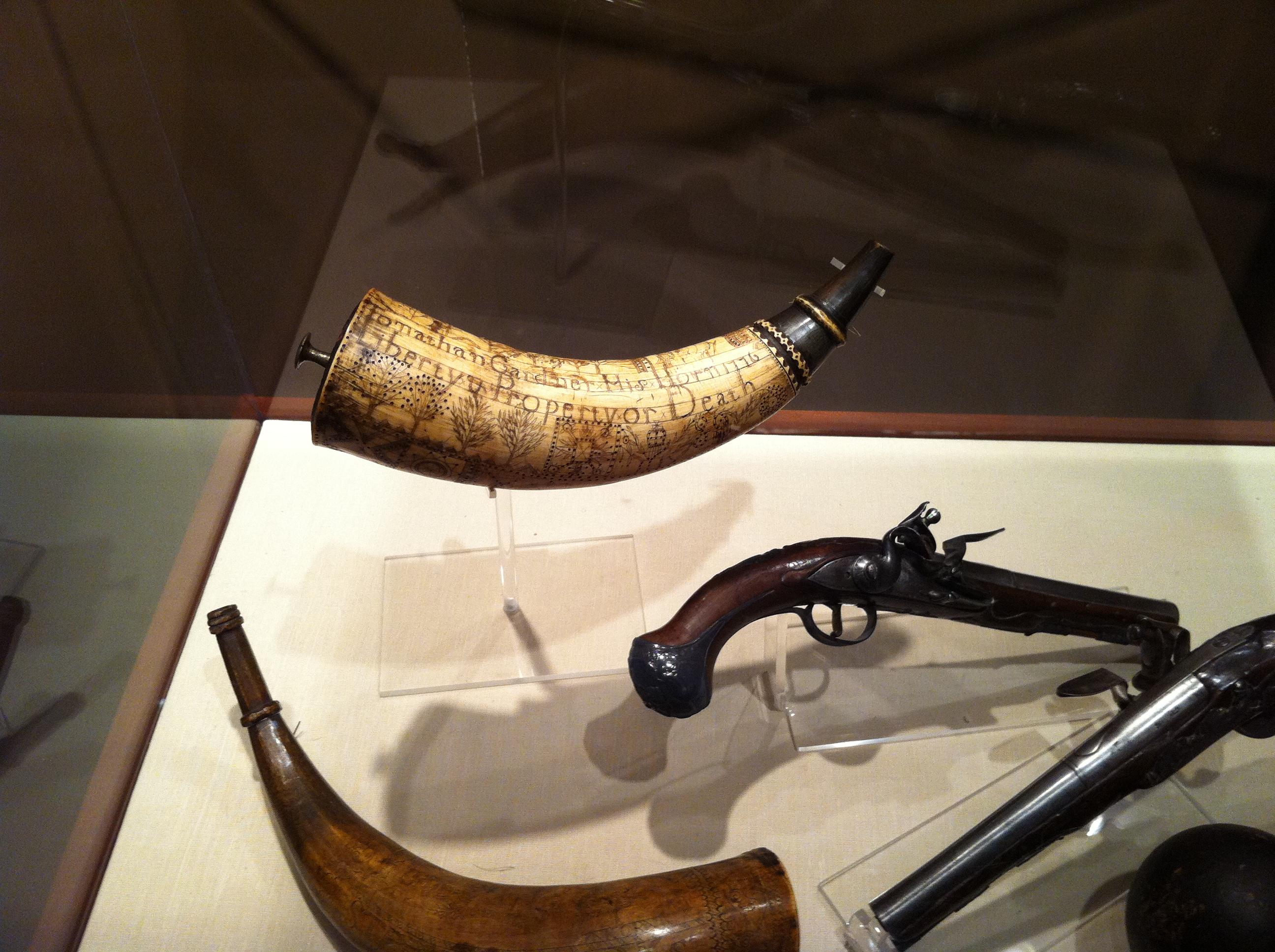
Engraved powder horns from the American Revolution in the Concord Museum

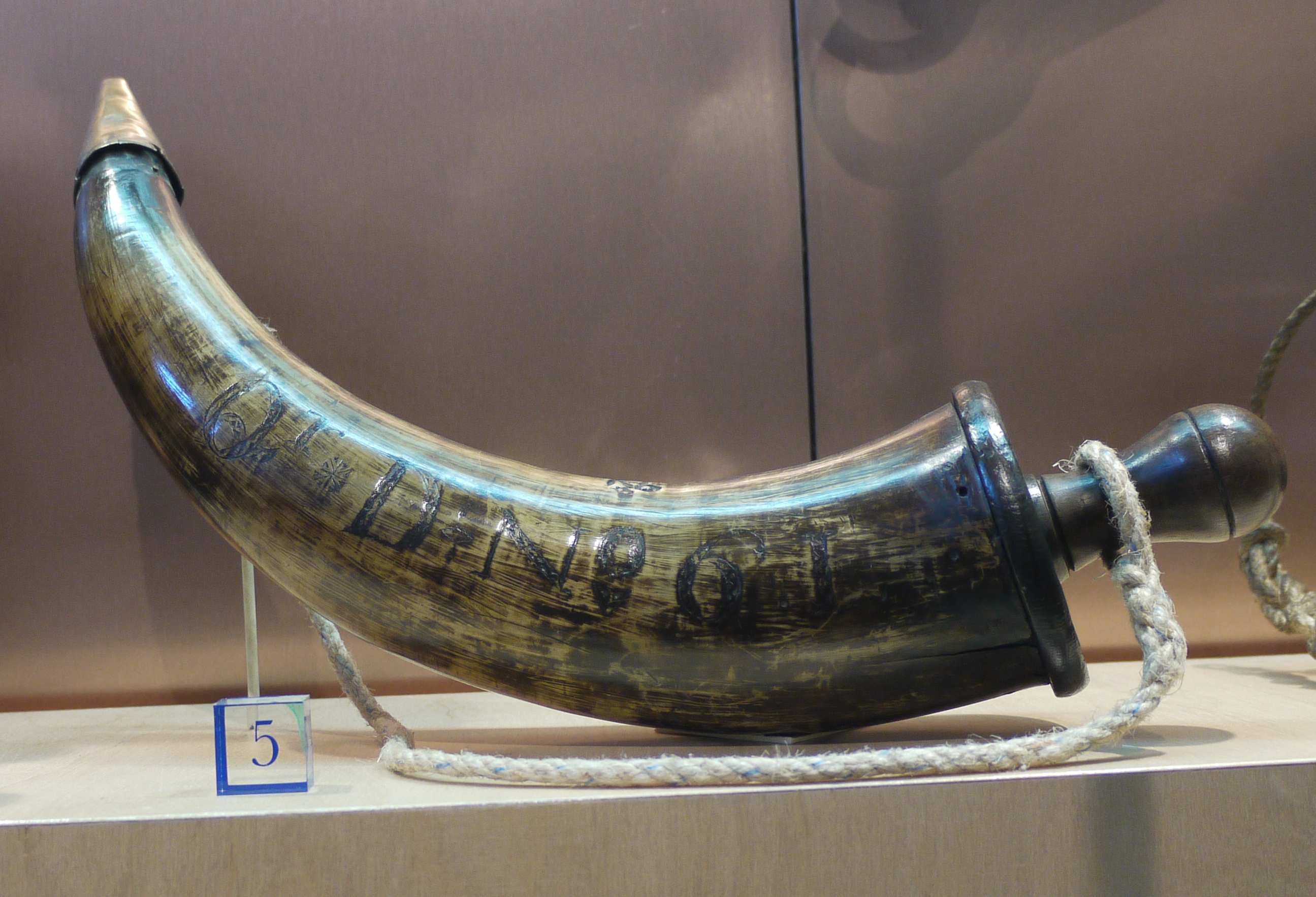
Royal Navy powder horn with engraving

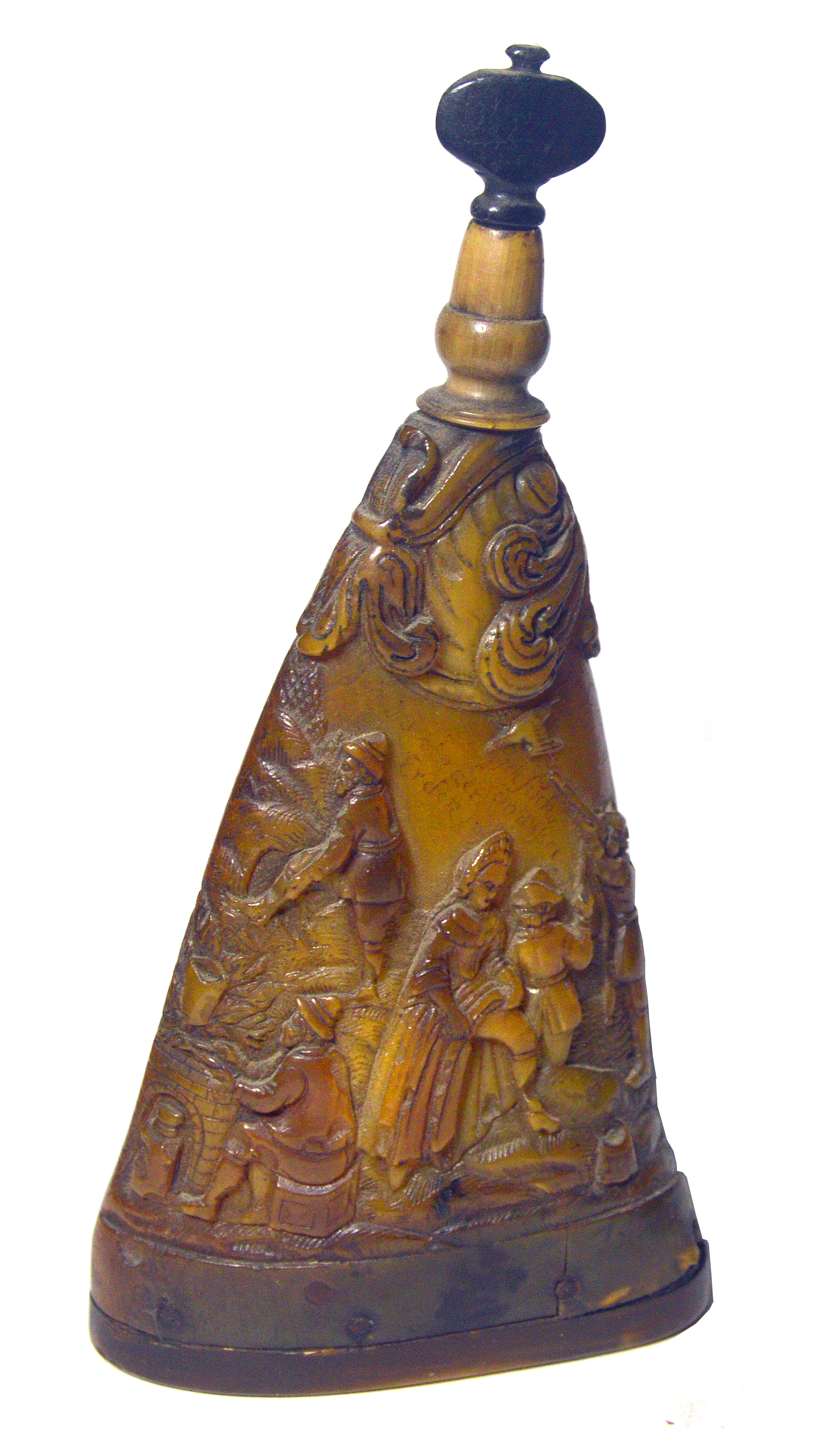
Carved German powder horn, c1700

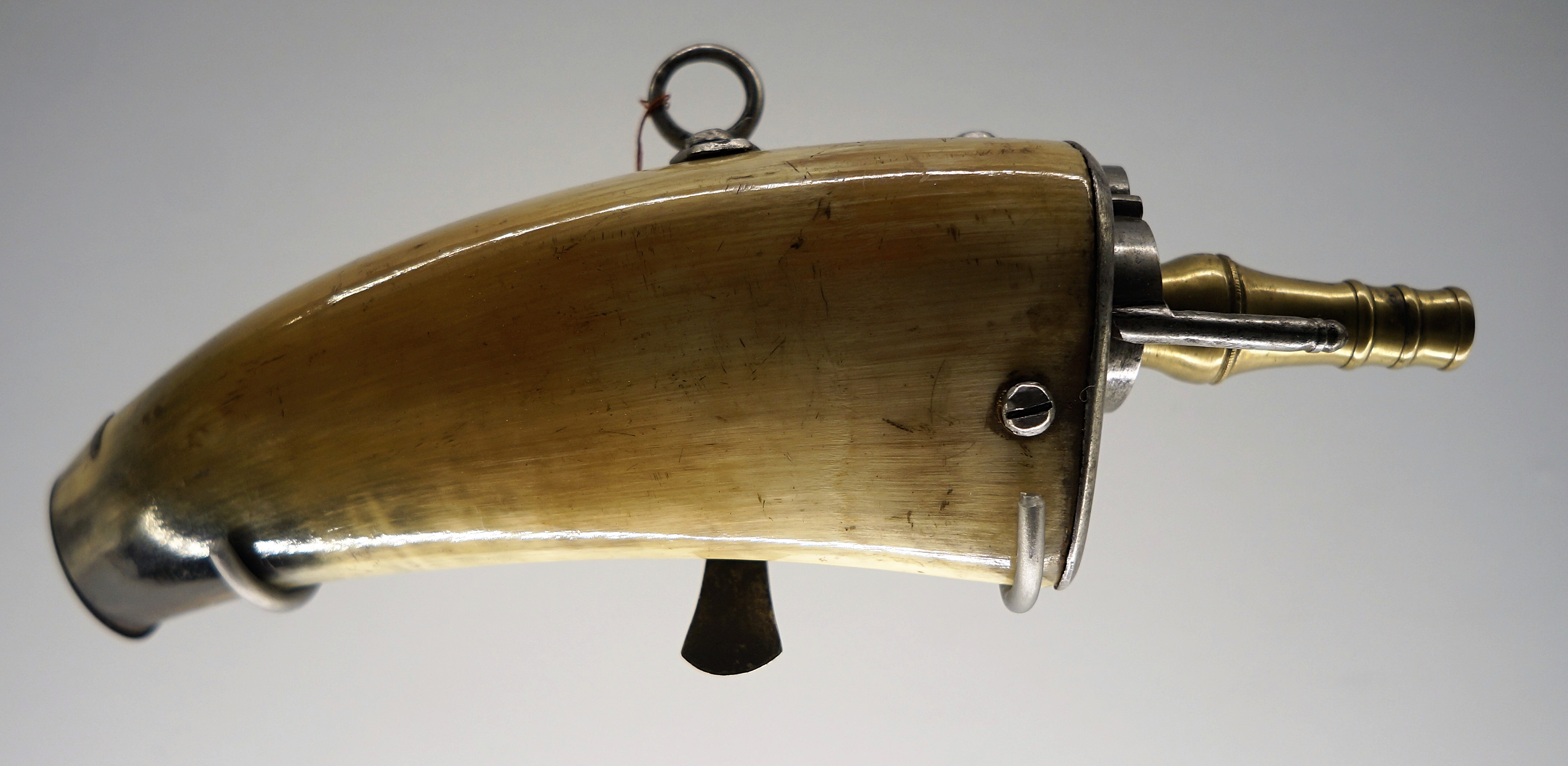
Powder horn in the PBA Lille, c1777

A powder horn is a container for gunpowder, and was generally created from cow, ox, or buffalo horn. The term may also be used for any personal container for gunpowder, although powder flask is the strictly correct term.

== Features ==
Typically there was a stopper at both ends, in later examples spring-loaded to close automatically for safety. The wide mouth was used for refilling, while the powder was dispensed from the narrow point. In some cases the point was closed and the mouth used for both, with a powder measure, a type of scoop used to dispense the powder, and in others both ends were open and the horn merely used as a funnel. The horn was typically held by a long strap and slung over the shoulder.

The inside and outside of a powder horn were often polished to make the horn translucent so that the soldier would be able to see how much powder he had left. The use of animal horn along with nonferrous metal parts ensured that the powder would not be detonated by sparks during storage and loading. Horn was also naturally waterproof and already hollow inside.

== Reasons for use ==
Although forms of pre-packaged paper cartridges go back to the Middle Ages, their extra cost and small benefit to civilian users discouraged widespread adoption of them except for militia duty. For example, on April 19, 1775, in Lexington and Concord, paper cartridges were routinely used by many civilians on the opening day of the American Revolutionary War. Similarly, the British soldiers there carried cartridge boxes holding 36 paper cartridges. The advantage of paper cartridges was speed; 3 to 4 rounds a minute were possible using paper cartridges. Measuring each charge before firing reduced the rate of fire to about one round per minute.

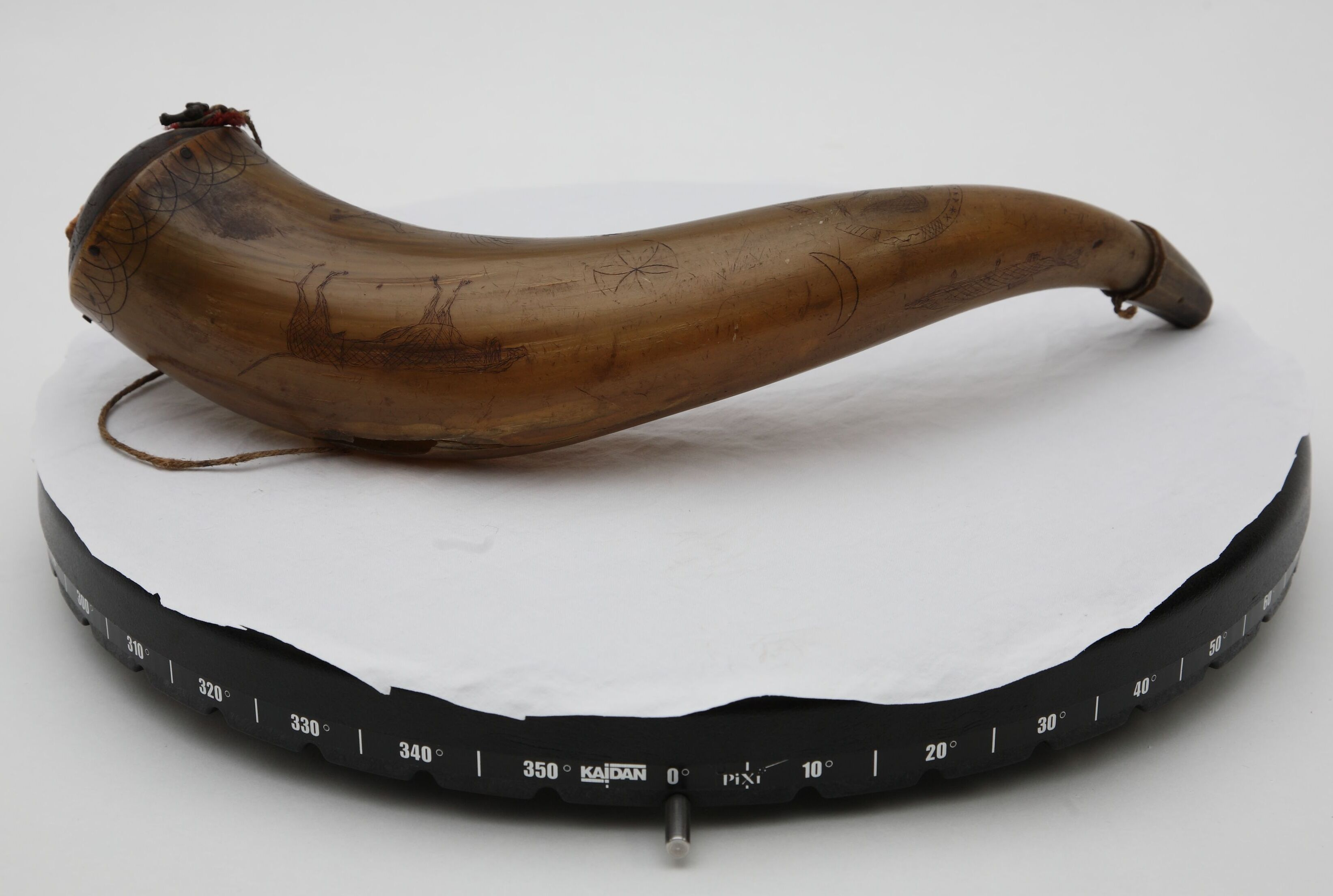
Engraved powder horn with strap

There were other methods, including small cloth bags containing the correct amount of powder for a single shot, that might be carried on a bandolier (again requiring a container for a supply for refilling). An important safety concern was that when reloading a muzzle-loading gun soon after a shot there might be small pieces of wadding burning in the muzzle, which would cause the new load of powder to ignite as a flash. So long as no part of the loader faced the end of the barrel this was not dangerous in itself, but if a spark reached the main supply in the powder flask a fatal explosion was likely. Various precautions were taken, both in the design and use of powder measures used with flasks, or in the flasks themselves, to prevent this from happening.

Powder horns also served the important purpose of keeping black powder dry. They began to be replaced by copper flasks in the nineteenth century.

Powder horns were also used for the priming of large naval guns, and in blasting operations; apparently sometimes the horn shape was merely a convenient form of funnel in such cases, and was open at both ends and not used as a container.

== Decoration ==
In America, a number of period horns dating from the French and Indian War throughout the American Revolution and beyond have been preserved in private collections with a few exceptions. Many decorated examples shed light on the life and history of the individuals that used them and can be classified as a medium of folk art.

Powder horns were often decorated, most often with engraving, making a form of scrimshaw, which was sometimes supplemented with color.

== Rendered obsolete ==
The powder horn was rendered obsolete by the innovations brought about by Hall, Sharps, Spencer and the later development of self-contained cartridges that were developed and marketed successfully by Oliver Winchester, after which manufactured metallic cartridges became standard.
