= Minneapolis Park and Recreation Board =

Local governing body

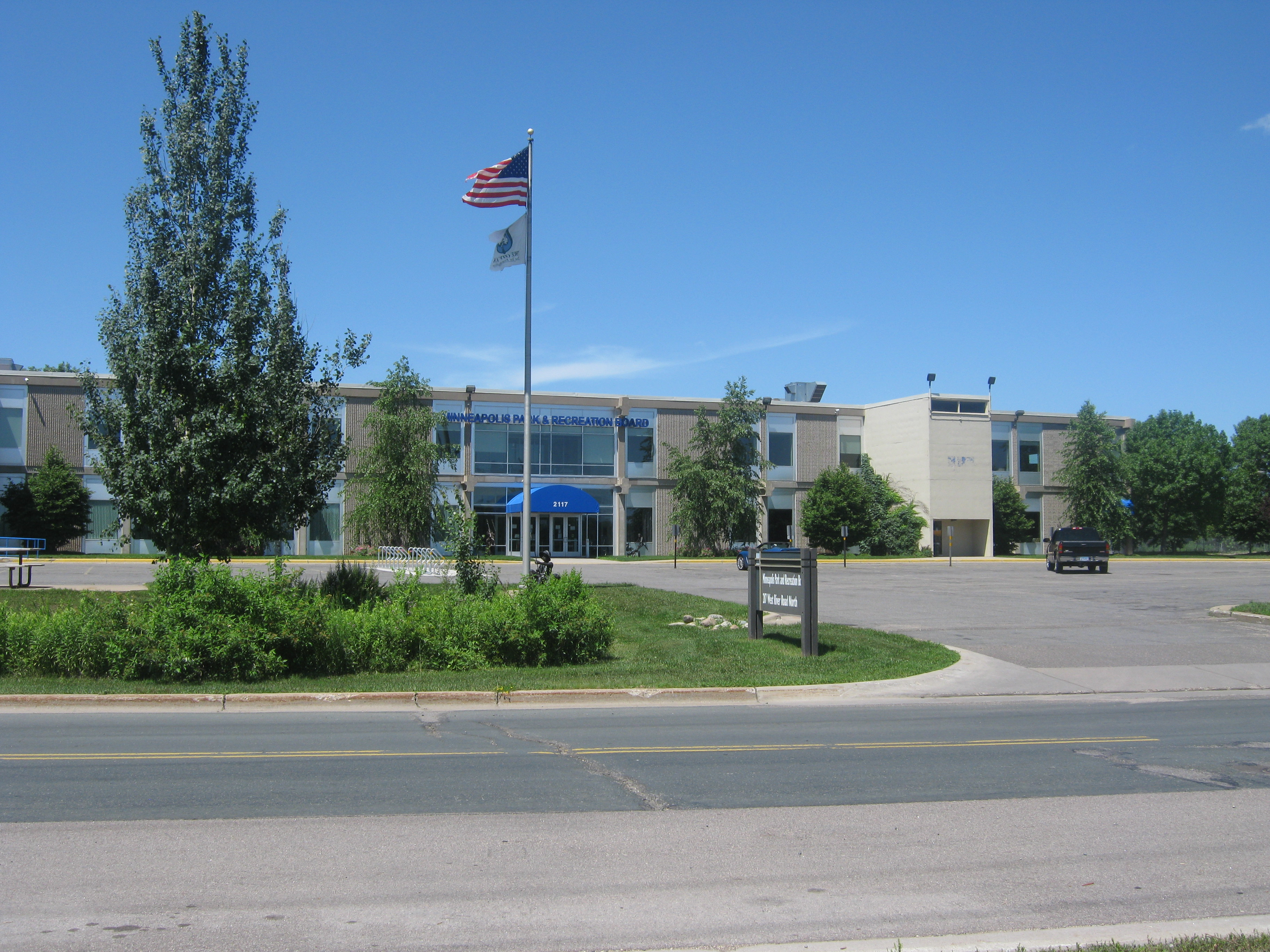
- Minneapolis Park and Recreation Board headquarters, located across West River Road from North Mississippi Regional Park.

Local government board overview
- Formed: 1883
- Jurisdiction: City of Minneapolis
- Employees: 500 full-time 1,300 part-time
- Annual budget: $111 million
- Local government board executive: Al Bangoura, Superintendent
- Website: minneapolisparks.org
- Area: 6,804 acres (27.53 km^{2})
- Visitors: 23 million
- Paths: 102 miles (164 km)
- Golf courses: 7
- Facilities: 179

The Minneapolis Park and Recreation Board (MPRB) is an independent park district that owns, maintains, and programs activities in public parks in Minneapolis, Minnesota, United States. It has 500 full-time and 1,300 part-time employees and an $111 million operating and capital budget.

The Minneapolis park system has been called the best-designed, best-financed, and best-maintained in America. Minneapolis was rated the #1 park system in the country for the sixth year in a row by The Trust for Public Land in 2018 and again in 2020. In 2024, it won the National Gold Medal Award for Excellence in Parks and Recreation.

== History ==
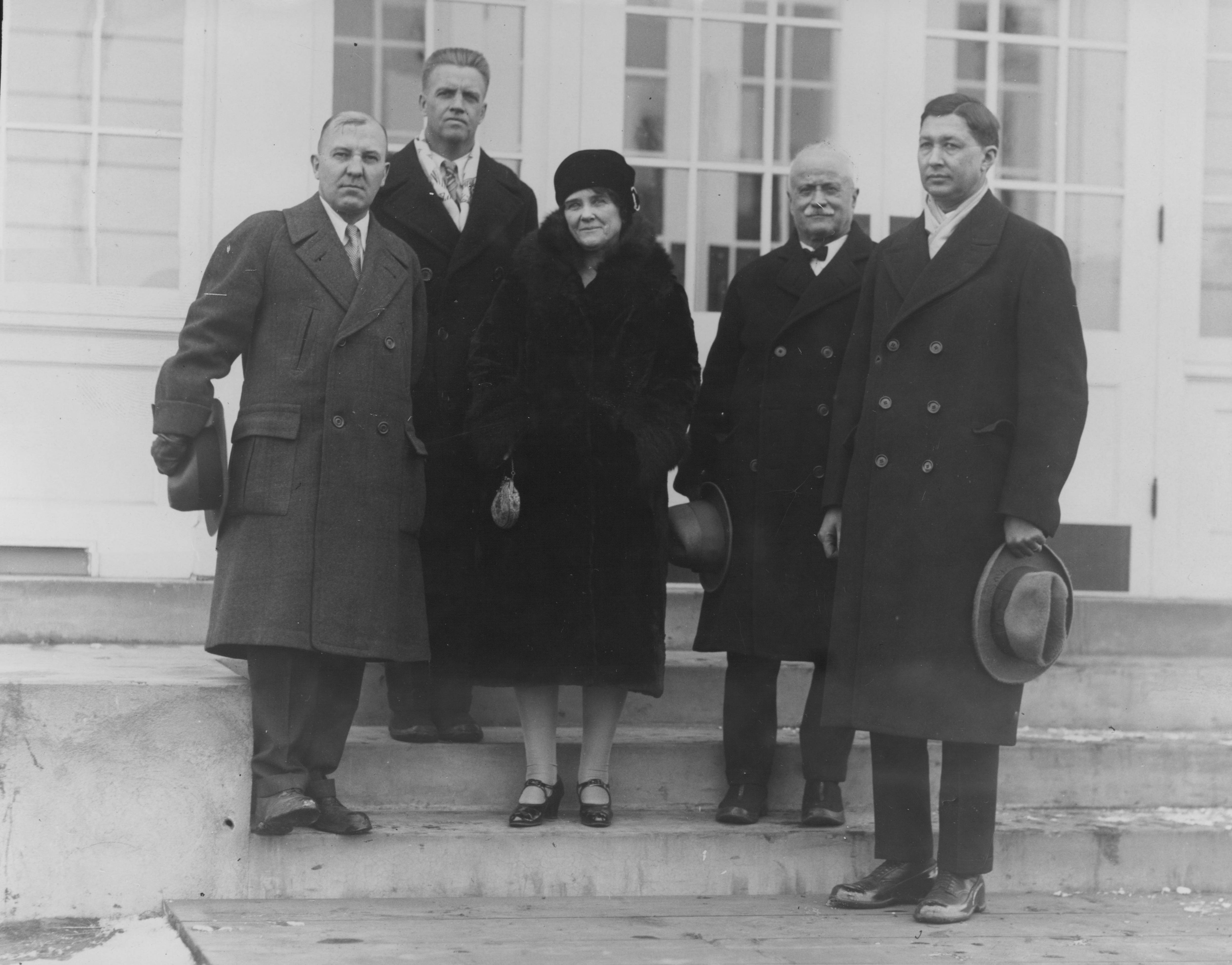
Park Board Officials Meet for Lynnhurst Fieldhouse Dedication (1928)

The Minneapolis Park and Recreation Board was created by an act of the Minnesota State Legislature and a vote of Minneapolis residents in 1883. Charles M. Loring was elected the first president of the board. Loring convinced landowners to donate property around Bde Maka Ska, Lake Harriet and Lake of the Isles, and on Minnehaha Creek.

Loring hired Horace Cleveland to create the original plan for Minneapolis parks in 1883, Cleveland's finest landscape architecture, preserving geographical landmarks and linking them with boulevards and parkways. Loring and Cleveland were instrumental in creating Minnehaha Park, with its falls as a centerpiece.

Theodore Wirth was superintendent from 1906 to 1936 and managed the expansion of Minneapolis parks from 1,810 to 5,241 acres (732 to 2,121 ha). Wirth was an advocate of active recreation in all city parks and put up signs saying "Please Walk on the Grass." Wirth also promoted neighborhood parks for the whole city, his plans called for a playground within one-quarter mile (400 m) of every child and a recreation center within one-half mile (800 m) of all residents, however Wirth never built them. In was from 1966 to 1978, during the tenure of superintendent Robert W. Ruhe, when the board built the city's neighborhood parks and recreation centers in underserved areas. In 2020, 98% of all residents lived within a 10-minute walk of a park, compared to the national median of 55%.

In July 2020, the park board voted to allow encampments for people experiencing homelessness at up to 20 city parks with 25 tents each. The change in policy came after several hundred people took up residence in Powderhorn Park in the aftermath of the murder of George Floyd by a Minneapolis police officer. However, the Powderhorn situation became untenable after numerous sexual assaults, fights, and drug use reported at the encampment generated alarm for nearby residents, leading to the eviction of many people in tents. Four people died in encampments in city parks in 2020, including a 38-year-old man who was stabbed to death on January 3, 2021, at an encampment in Minnehaha Park.

On November 18, 2020, the board legalized female topfreedom in the parks.

On July 2, 2024, MPRB employees announced a week-long strike, citing insufficient wage raises and hazard protections in recent contract negotiations. The strike began on July 4, one of the city's busiest days for green spaces, with workers returning on July 26 following a new contract agreement.

== Description ==
Minnehaha Falls is part of Minnehaha Park, a 167-acre (68 ha) jewel of the Minneapolis park system.

The park system's 6,084 acres (24.62 km^{2}) make up 15% of the total area of Minneapolis, equal to the national median.

The city's Chain of Lakes, consisting of seven lakes and Minnehaha Creek, is connected by bike, running, and walking paths and used for swimming, fishing, picnics, boating, and ice skating. A parkway for cars, a bikeway for riders, and a walkway for pedestrians runs parallel along the 52 miles (84 km) route of the Grand Rounds National Scenic Byway. Parks are also connected through the Mississippi National River and Recreation Area regional parks and visitor centers.

Among the board's youth work programs, Teen Teamworks has provided on-the-job training for green careers to ages 14 to 24, since 1986. In 2022, the program recruited 500 participants. Other youth programs are Recreation Plus and the Youthline Outreach Mentorship Program, founded in the 1980s and 1991. The board is the city's largest employer of youth.

The country's oldest public wildflower garden, the Eloise Butler Wildflower Garden and Bird Sanctuary, is located within Theodore Wirth Park. Wirth Park extends into Golden Valley and is almost 90% the size of Central Park in New York City. Site of the 53-foot (16 m) Minnehaha Falls, Minnehaha Park is one of the city's oldest and most popular parks, receiving over 850,000 visitors each year. Henry Wadsworth Longfellow named Hiawatha's wife Minnehaha for the Minneapolis waterfall in The Song of Hiawatha, a bestselling and often-parodied 19th century poem.

The first natural swimming pool in the United States opened in Webber Park in 2015. The outdoor pool does not use any chemicals, rather it uses natural filters and plants in several container ponds to keep the water clean.

== Facilities ==
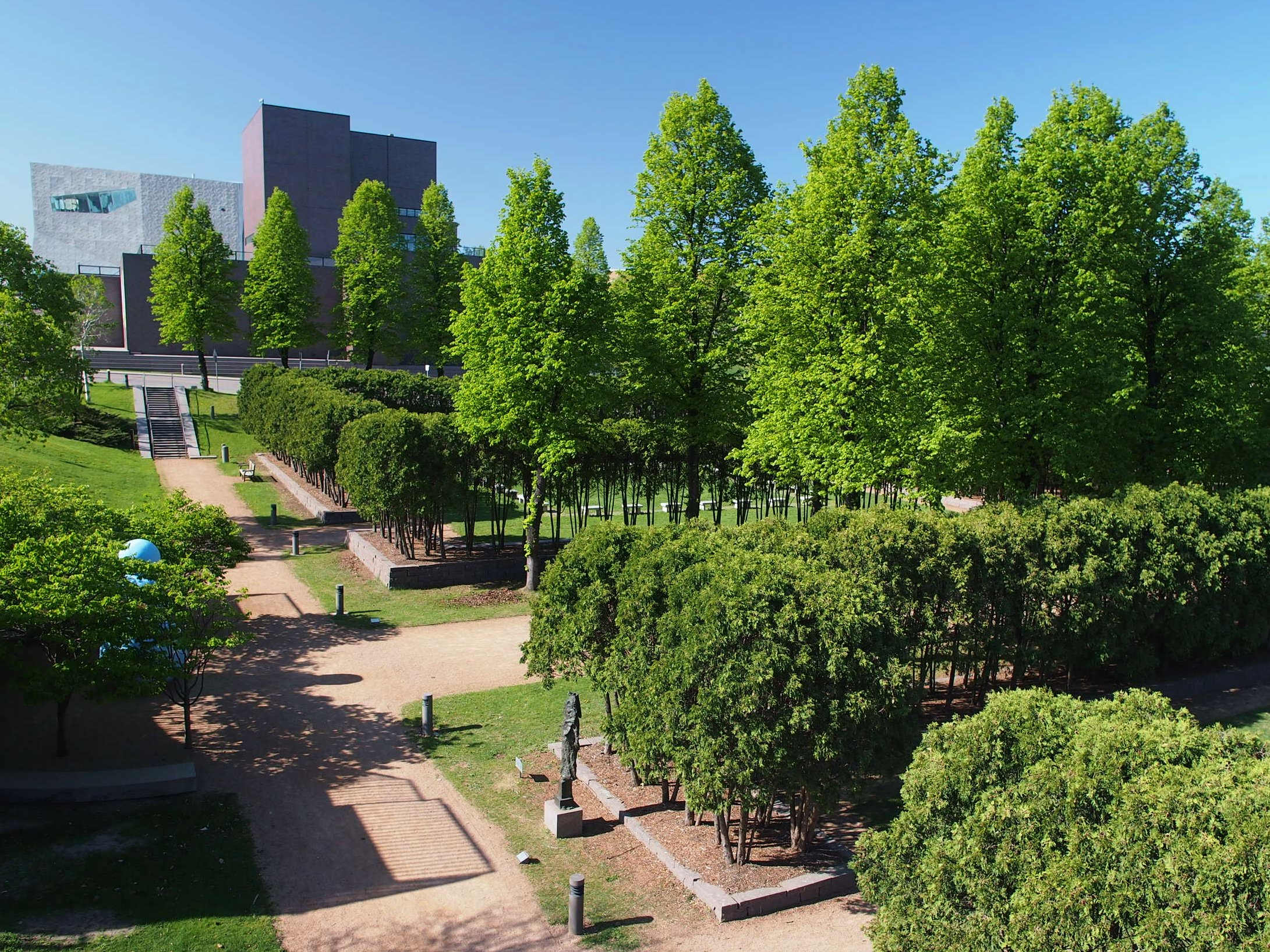
The Minneapolis Sculpture Garden

The Minneapolis Park and Recreation Board facilities include 6,804 acres (27.53 km^{2}) of land and water, 179 properties, 102 miles (164 km) of biking and walking paths, 49 recreation centers, 22 lakes, 12 formal gardens, and seven golf courses.

=== List of notable facilities ===
- Bohanon Park
- Bohemian Flats
- Cedar Lake
- Gold Medal Park
- Grand Rounds National Scenic Byway
- Kenilworth Trail
- Bde Maka Ska
- Lake Harriet
- Lake Hiawatha
- Lake of the Isles
- Lake Nokomis
- Lyndale Park
- Mill Ruins Park
- Minneapolis Sculpture Garden
- Minnehaha Park
- Mississippi Gorge Regional Park
- North Mississippi Regional Park
- Parade Stadium
- Powderhorn Park
- Theodore Wirth Park
- Tower Hill Park
- Victory Memorial Parkway
- Winchell Trail

== Governance ==
The Minneapolis Park and Recreation Board is an independently elected, semi-autonomous park district responsible for governing, maintaining, and developing the Minneapolis park system. The jurisdiction of the park board is contiguous with the City of Minneapolis borders, although it owns four golf courses and its largest park, Theodore Wirth Park is outside the city limits.

Minneapolis voters elect nine commissioners every four years: one from each of the six park districts, and three that serve at-large. The district and at-large members are elected using ranked choice voting. The Board of Commissioners appoints the superintendent and sets policy for the park board. Minneapolis and Vancouver, Canada are the two largest cities in the US and Canada to have elected park boards.

== Police ==
The Superintendent of the Parks has oversight of the Minneapolis Park Police Department—the law enforcement authority of the park board. Led by a park police chief, the force consists of 30 sworn officers and 20 part-time park patrol agents. The park police is a separate entity from the Minneapolis Police Department, but the two forces have shared training, support services, and authority to police in both parks and throughout the city. The park board voted unanimously on June 3, 2020, to end its relationship with the Minneapolis Police Department following the murder of George Floyd by a city police officer. The decision prohibited Minneapolis police officers from staffing park events and prohibited park police from assisting the Minneapolis Police Department. Nearly two years later, on May 4, 2022, the park board restored its relationship with the Minneapolis Police Department to allow the return of large events in parks that had been disrupted due to the COVID-19 pandemic.

== See also ==
- 2020 Minneapolis park encampments
- Trails in Minneapolis
- Theodore Wirth House–Administration Building

== Bibliography ==
- Smith, David C. (2008). City of Parks: The Story of Minneapolis Parks. Minneapolis: The Foundation for Minneapolis Parks. ISBN 978-0-615-19535-3.
