= Janneke Hille Ris Lambers =

American plant community ecologist

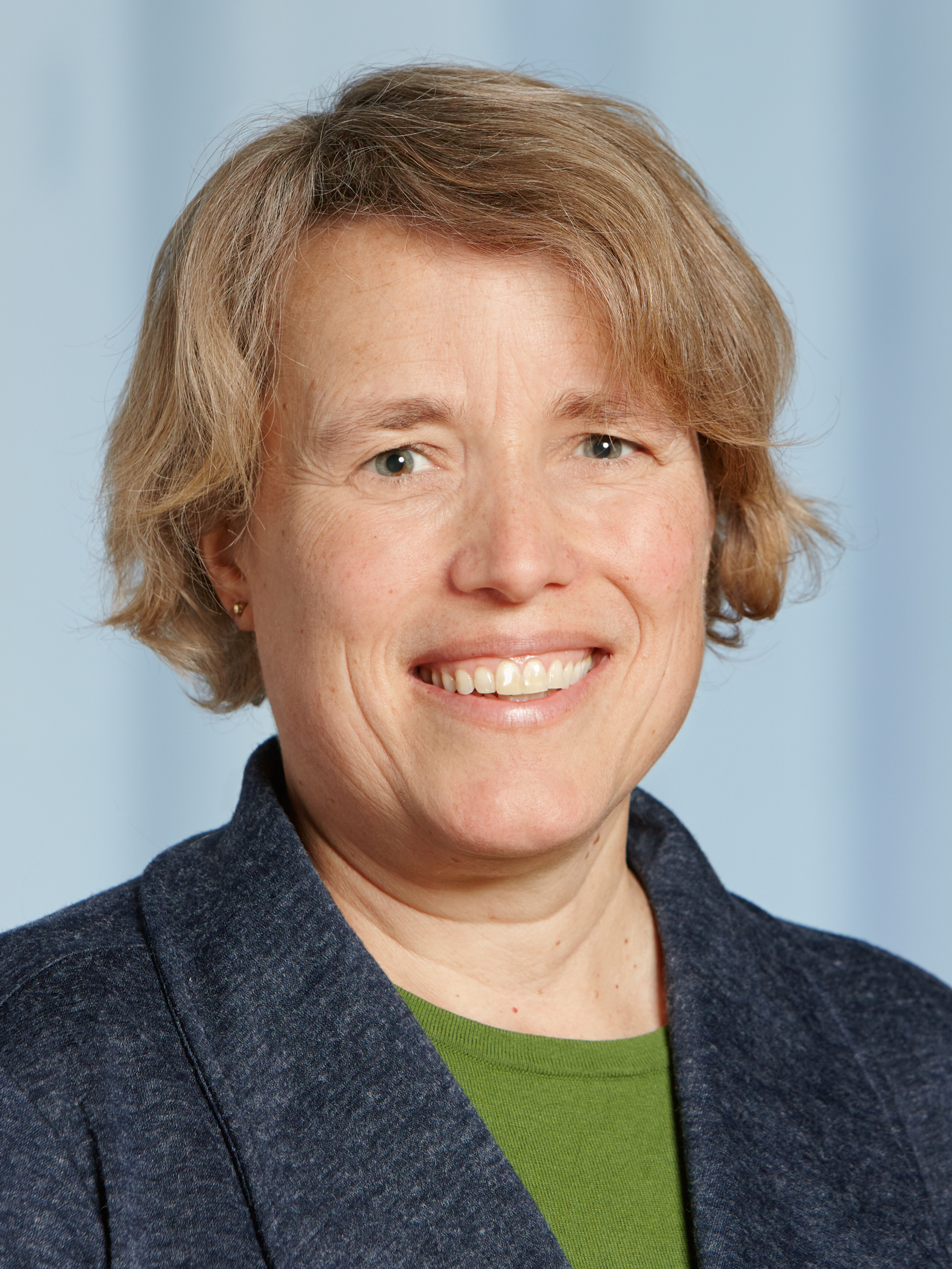
Janneke Hille Ris Lambers (2020)

Janneke Hille Ris Lambers (born 1972) is a professor of Plant Ecology at ETH Zurich in Switzerland at the Institute for Integrative Biology (IBZ) since 2020 and an Affiliate Full Professor at University of Washington in the United States.

== Early life and education ==
Lambers was born in Wageningen, Netherlands in 1972. She completed her academic training in the USA. She received a Doctor of Philosophy degree from Duke University in 2001 on coexistence of temperate forest tree species, focusing on the differences among temperate tree species in seed dispersal, seed banking and density-dependent mortality and how those characteristics contribute to maintenance of diversity. Her thesis was supervised by James S. Clark. During her PhD she worked at the Coweeta Hydrologic Laboratory in western North Carolina (a Long Term Research Research Network site - LTER).

== Career and research ==
Throughout her career Janneke has focused on the maintenance of species diversity and the impact of global environmental change on plant communities. She has worked on a variety of plant communities including temperate tree species, grassland communities, legume species, sagebrush steppe communities, conifer trees, wildflowers, subtropical forests and tundra biomes, to mention a few. Her main approaches include observational studies, manipulative experiments, and statistical modelling.

=== Career ===
After her PhD and during her first postdoc, Janneke worked at another LTER site, the Cedar Creek Ecosystem Science Reserve, associated with the University of Minnesota, together with David Tilman. There she focused on how declining diversity and species identity influences productivity and the impacts of global change on seed production. She then moved on to a postdoc at the University of California, Santa Barbara where she worked with Jonathan Levine and focused on the factors that allowed Mediterranean annual grasses to dominate over the diverse California annual grasses and forbs as well as on the contributions of niche and neutral processes to the coexistence of Serpentine annuals. For that research she was awarded $77,264 from the U.S. NSF Ecology Panel Award. She came to University of Washington at 2006, received tenure in 2010 and became a full professor in 2014. She was elected a Fellow of Ecological Society of America in 2018.

=== MeadoWatch program ===
A program that has been founded in collaboration between the Hille Ris Lambers Lab and Brosi Lab created in 2013 actively engages the public to participate in community science and collect data to better understand the impact of climate change on biodiversity.
