= Nancy Johnson (disambiguation) =

Nancy Johnson (born 1935) is an American politician.

Nancy Johnson may also refer to:

- Nancy Johnson (sport shooter) (born 1974), American sports shooter
- Nancy Johnson (engineer), materials scientist for General Motors
- Nancy M. Johnson (1794–1890), American inventor
- Nancey Jackson Johnson (born 1968), American gospel musician
- Nancy Collins Johnson, American earth scientist
- Nancy Johnson, character in The OA
