= University of Minnesota College of Biological Sciences =

The College of Biological Sciences
- Type: Public college
- Established: 1965
- Parent institution: University of Minnesota
- Dean: Saara J DeWalt
- Faculty: 153 tenured and tenure-track
- Students: 2,538
- Undergraduates: 2,264
- Doctoral students: 274
- Location: Minneapolis and St. Paul, Minnesota, United States
- Campus: Urban
- Website: www.cbs.umn.edu

The College of Biological Sciences (CBS) is one of seven freshman-admitting colleges at the University of Minnesota, a public land-grant research university in the Twin Cities of Minneapolis and Saint Paul, Minnesota, United States. Established in 1965, the College of Biological Sciences is located on both the Minneapolis and the St. Paul campuses. Faculty in the college conduct research on a wide range of topics that contribute to understanding of the environment, human health, and basic biology. Saara DeWalt is the dean of the college.

== History ==
The College of Biological Sciences was established in 1964 and began to operate in 1965. Important dates include:

- 1964 - The University of Minnesota Board of Regents approves the establishment of the college on July 10, 1964.
- 1965 - On September 1, CBS begins operations. Richard Caldecott is the founding dean.
- 1967 - CBS grants the first bachelor of science degrees to graduates in May.
- 1970 - The board of regents approves the first CBS constitution.
- 1973 - The Biological Sciences Center was constructed on the St. Paul campus.
- 1987 - Paul Magee is named dean of the college.
- 1993 - The Ecology Building was constructed on the St. Paul campus.
- 1995 - Robert Elde is named the dean of the college.
- 1997 - CBS begins admitting first-year students for the first time.
- 1998 - Elde leads a university-wide reorganization to consolidate and realign departments.
- 2003 - The college launches the Nature of Life program at Itasca Biological Station and Laboratories.
- 2014 - The college introduces the first-of-its-kind Department of Biology Teaching and Learning.
- 2015 - Valery Forbes is named dean of the college.
- 2023 - Saara DeWalt is named dean of the college.

== Structure ==
The college includes five departments, including:

- Department of Biochemistry, Molecular Biology and Biophysics (BMBB)*
- Department of Biology Teaching and Learning (BTL)
- Department of Ecology, Evolution and Behavior (EEB)
- Department of Genetics, Cell Biology and Development (GCD)*
- Department of Plant and Microbial Biology (PMB)

* Joint with the University of Minnesota Medical School

The college's Departments of Plant and Microbial Biology and Ecology, Evolution and Behavior, along with the CBS Conservatory & Botanical Collection and the BioTechnology Institute are located on the St. Paul campus. The Departments of Biochemistry, Molecular Biology and Biophysics, Genetics, Cell Biology and Development, and Biology Teaching and Learning are based on the Minneapolis campus. Administrative offices for the College of Biological Sciences, including the CBS Dean's Office, are located in Snyder Hall on the St. Paul campus. CBS Student Services is located in the Molecular and Cellular Biology Building on the East Bank campus. CBS also operates two field stations—Cedar Creek Ecosystem Science Reserve and Itasca Biological Station and Laboratories—and the CBS Conservatory & Botanical Collection, for education programs, field research, and public outreach.

== Signature programs ==
- Nature of Life - All incoming CBS freshman must attend before entering their first year at the university. This portion of Nature of Life prepares students for the upcoming year, opens up a structured time and place for students to build community with one another and faculty, and gives them an idea of one of the research facilities provided by CBS and the university. Students are given the opportunity to attend Itasca Biological Station, Cedar Creek Reserve, or an online equivalent. The program continues for the next three semesters, during which each enrolled student is expected to fully immerse themselves into CBS and university-wide events and communities. The sequence begins with two semesters of an in-person course, followed by a third of online learning.
- Dean's Scholars - Dean's Scholars is a unique program designed to support CBS students in building their leadership skills and preparing to be active citizens and change makers in their chosen professions and communities after graduation. Students are invited to participate in the program based on demonstrated leadership potential and a commitment to service based on the university application materials.

== Field stations ==
Itasca Biological Station and Laboratories, established in 1909, is a field station located inside Itasca State Park in northwest Minnesota. The station includes facilities whom visiting students and researchers conduct research, participate in field courses, and hold workshops and orientations, including the college's Nature of Life program. The station includes bunkhouse cabins and faculty cabins, along with 11 research labs spread across 6 buildings. Seven of the labs are accessible year-round.

Cedar Creek Ecosystem Science Reserve, located in East Bethel, Minnesota, just north of the Twin Cities, is widely considered the place where modern ecosystem ecology was established with the work of Raymond Lindeman. It is home to some of the longest running ecological experiments in the world.

== Facilities ==
The College of Biological Sciences has footprints on both the Minneapolis and St. Paul campuses as well as beyond campus at its field stations in Itasca State Park and East Bethel, MN. CBS facilities include:

- Cargill Building for Microbial and Plant Genomics
- Snyder Hall
- Gortner Laboratories
- Biological Sciences Center complex
- Ecology Building
- Molecular and Cellular Biology Building
- Itasca Biological Station and Laboratories
- Cedar Creek Ecosystem Science Reserve

== Faculty ==
CBS is home to field-shaping faculty widely recognized for their contributions to the sciences. Five current faculty are National Academy of Sciences members, including:

- Ruth Shaw, Ecology, Evolution and Behavior, 2021
- Dan Voytas, Genetics, Cell Biology, and Development, 2019
- Marlene Zuk, Ecology, Evolution and Behavior, 2019
- Sarah Hobbie, Ecology, Evolution and Behavior, 2014
- G. David Tilman, Ecology, Evolution and Behavior, 2002

Some noteworthy accomplishments by distinguished faculty include:

- In 1982, Margaret Bryan Davis became the first woman at the University of Minnesota elected to the National Academy of Sciences.
- G. David Tilman, a professor in the Department of Ecology, Evolution and Behavior and former director of Cedar Creek Ecosystem Science Reserve, is among the most cited ecologist in the world. He gained prominence for his seminal discoveries regarding the role of biodiversity for ecosystems.

== Research ==
Faculty and students in the college conduct research on a wide range of topics at every scale of biological organizations "from molecules to ecosystems." Between 208-2023, the college's average grant expenditures were $30.8 million a year. CBS researchers are supported by the National Science Foundation, the National Institute of Health, and other major funders.

In 2023, the University was ranked #1 in the United States and in the top three globally for ecology by Shanghai Rankings of Academic Subjects and #6 in biochemistry by the Blue Ridge Research Rankings.

== See also ==
- University of Minnesota
- List of University of Minnesota people
- University of Minnesota Medical Center
