= Christopher Klausmeier =

American ecologist

Christopher Klausmeier is an American theoretical ecologist. He is an MSU Research Foundation Professor at the Kellogg Biological Station of Michigan State University. He is known for his work in spatial ecology, ecological stoichiometry, and trait-based eco-evolutionary dynamics.

== Education and career ==
Klausmeier earned a B.S. in mathematics in 1995 from Harvey Mudd College and a Ph.D. in ecology, evolution and behavior in 2000 from the University of Minnesota, advised by David Tilman and Claudia Neuhauser. Following postdoctoral research at EAWAG and Princeton University with Simon Levin, he joined the faculty at Georgia Tech in 2003. He moved to Michigan State University in 2005.

== Research ==
Klausmeier’s Ph.D. thesis was titled "The Role of Spatial Heterogeneity in Ecological Communities". It included a model of pattern formation in semi-arid vegetation, which is now known as the Klausmeier model and has been extensively studied by mathematicians.

Since 2001, his research has largely focused on the ecology of plankton, in collaboration with Elena Litchman. This research has spanned topics from ecological stoichiometry, including explaining the Redfield N:P ratio, to trait-based ecology, seasonal succession and the vertical distribution of phytoplankton, including modeling the deep chlorophyll maximum.

== Awards and honors ==
- 2009 NSF CAREER Award
- 2016 MSU Research Foundation Professor
- 2018, 2022 Outstanding Ecology Theory Paper Award
