= Klausmeier =

Klausmeier is a surname. Notable people with the surname include:

- Christopher Klausmeier, American ecologist
- Herbert Klausmeier (1915–2014), American educational psychologist
- Johnny Klausmeier (born 1981), American NASCAR crew chief
- Kathy Klausmeier (born 1950), American politician
