= Marlene Zuk =

American evolutionary biologist

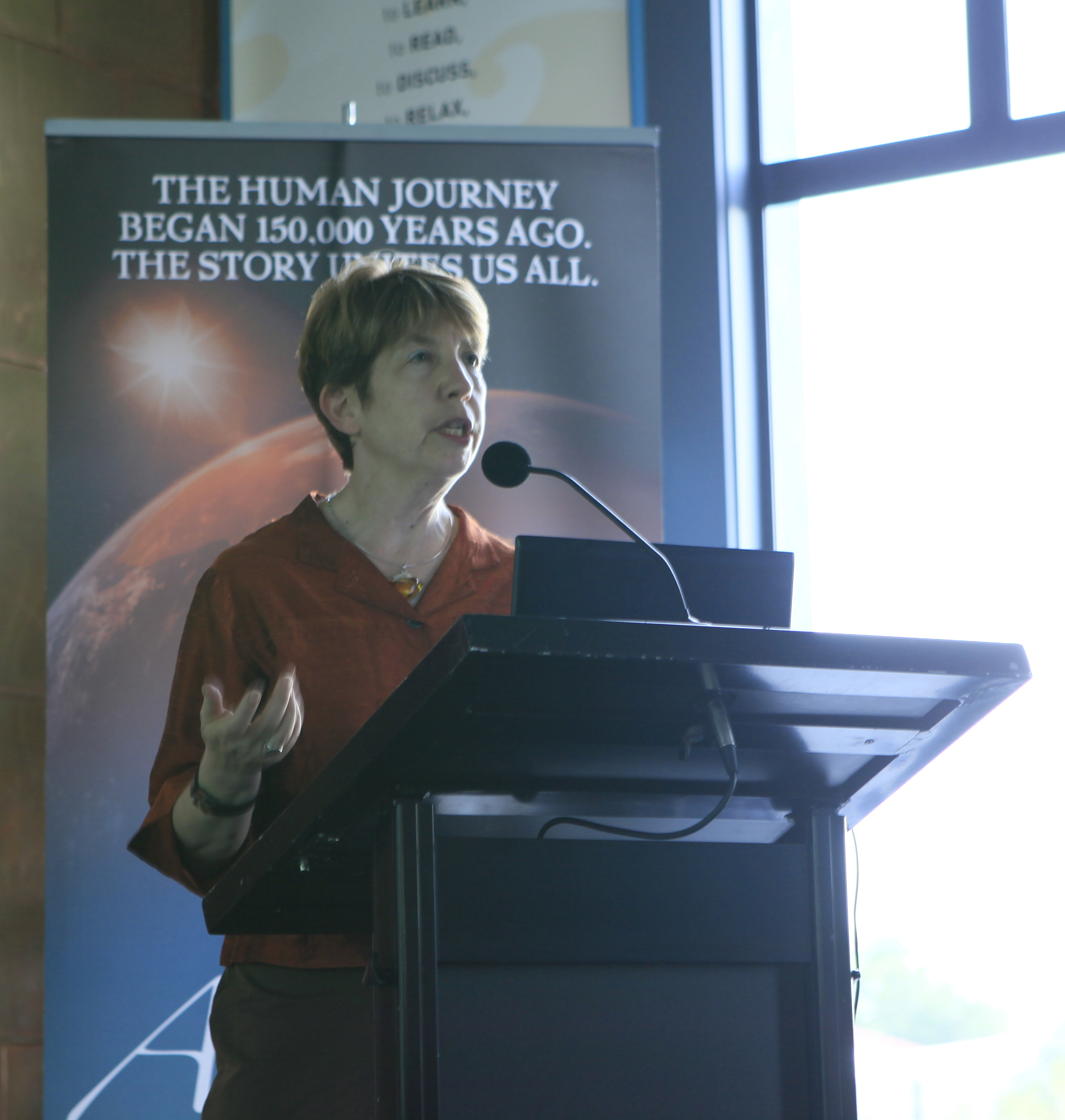
- Zuk in Palmerston North City Library, 2014
- Born: May 20, 1956 (age 70); Philadelphia, Pennsylvania, U.S.
- Citizenship: United States
- Education: University of California, Santa Barbara; University of Michigan
- Spouse: John Rotenberry
- Awards: BBVA Foundation Frontiers of Knowledge Award (2022)
- Scientific career
- Fields: Evolutionary biology, behavioral ecology
- Workplaces: University of California, Riverside; University of Minnesota
- Thesis: Sexual selection, mate choice and gregarine parasite levels in the field crickets Gryllus veletis and G. pennsylvanicus (1986)

Marlene Zuk (born May 20, 1956) is an American evolutionary biologist and behavioral ecologist. She worked as professor of biology at the University of California, Riverside (UCR) until she transferred to the University of Minnesota in 2012. Her studies involve sexual selection and parasites.

== Biography ==
Zuk was born in Philadelphia, Pennsylvania and is a native of Los Angeles. She became interested in insects at a young age. At the University of California, Santa Barbara, Zuk started majoring in English, but decided to switch to Biology. After earning her bachelor's degree, she wrote and taught for three years.

In 1982, she and W. D. Hamilton proposed the "good genes" hypothesis of sexual selection. Zuk started attending the University of Michigan in 1986 and earned her Doctor of Philosophy. She completed her postdoctoral research at the University of New Mexico. She joined the UCR faculty in 1989. In April 2012, Zuk and her husband, John Rotenberry, transferred to the University of Minnesota, where they both work at its College of Biological Sciences.

Zuk has received honorary doctorates from Sweden's Uppsala University (2010) and the University of Jyväskylä in Finland (2016).

== Work ==
=== Research interests ===
Zuk's research of interest deals with the evolution of sexual behavior (especially in relation to parasites), mate choice, and Animal behavior. A recurring theme in Zuk's writing and lectures is feminism and women in science. Zuk is critical of the Paleolithic diet. In 1996 Zuk was awarded a continuing grant by the National Science Foundation for an investigation into the ways that variation in females effects sexual selection and what qualities in males indicate vigor.

==== Studies ====
Zuk studies evolutionary behavior, concentrating on sexual selection and communication. Additionally, she has researched the importance of parasites and pathogens in the evolution of different sexes. Marlene Zuk and William Hamilton created the Hamilton-Zuk Hypothesis in 1982. This hypothesis stated that sexual traits in animals evolved to demonstrate a mate's resistance to parasites. Females pick their mating partner based upon the most intense traits to make sure their offspring inherits superior genes.

==== Women in science ====
Zuk is outspoken about promoting women in science. In 2018, Zuk published an Op-Ed in the Los Angeles Times. Titled, "There's nothing inherent about the fact that men outnumber women in the sciences," the article countered recurring suggestions that women are underrepresented in scientific fields due to inherent preferences toward the humanities. By highlighting the inextricable relationship between nature and nurture, she points out the impossibility of attributing female underrepresentation in science to any inborn cause. Citing essential scientific integrity, she argues that until boys and girls are raised under identical circumstances one could not possibly prove any inherent female leanings towards or away from the sciences.

=== Major scholarship ===
Beginning in the early 1990s, Zuk opened avenues for new research with her field work investigating the interactions in Hawaii between the Pacific field cricket Teleogryllus oceanicus and a recently introduced parasitoid fly Ormia ochracea. Zuk recognized "a unique opportunity" to study in real time a trait for which reproductive success and survival success were in conflict. The male crickets used stridulation calls to attract mates, but the calls also attracted eavesdropping female flies. These flies deposited larvae that burrowed into the callers, consuming and killing them within a few days.

Opportunities for scholars attentive to Zuk's work expanded when, in 2003, Zuk and her team found that on one Hawaiian island, Kauai, non-calling Teleogryllus oceanicus male crickets had appeared and were now abundant. A single-locus mutation had altered male cricket wing development, making stridulation impossible. The conferred survival advantage under predator selection had, in fewer than 20 generations, changed the genotype, phenotype, and behavior of 90% of the island's cricket males. Zuk christened the new form "flatwing." Since 2006, scholars in various biological disciplines have built on Zuk's foundational work.

=== Selected works ===
Her books and articles include:

- Heritable true fitness and bright birds: a role for parasites? (1982). Science.
- Sexual Selections: what we can and can't learn about sex from animals, (2002). University of California Press, Berkeley. ISBN 978-0520240759.
- Riddled with Life: Friendly Worms, Ladybug Sex, and the Parasites That Make Us Who We Are, (2007). Harcourt, Inc., New York. ISBN 978-0156034685.
- "Can bugs improve your sex life?" (August 1, 2011). Wall Street Journal.
- Sex on Six Legs: Lessons on Life, Love and Language from the Insect World, (2011). Houghton Mifflin Harcourt, New York. ISBN 978-0151013739.
- "Bring on the aerial ant sex" (2012). Los Angeles Times, April 29.
- "Anthropomorphism: A Peculiar Institution " (2012). The Scientist 26: 66–67.
- Paleofantasy: What Evolution Really Tells Us about Sex, Diet, and How We Live, (2013). W. W. Norton & Company, New York. ISBN 978-0393347920.
- Dancing Cockatoos and the Dead Man Test: How Behavior Evolves and Why It Matters, (2022). W. W. Norton & Company, New York. ISBN 978-1324007227.
- Outsider Animals: How the Creatures at the Margins of Our Lives Have the Most to Teach Us, (2026). Princeton University Press.

=== College Leadership ===
Zuk is a professor in the department of Ecology, Evolution, and Behavior in the College of Biological Sciences. She is the Associate Dean for Faculty.

== Awards and honors ==
In 2015, Zuk was the recipient of the Edward O. Wilson Naturalist Award by the American Society of Naturalists.

Zuk was elected a Fellow of the American Academy of Arts and Sciences in 2017, and was elected to the National Academy of Sciences in 2019.

The Society for Integrative & Comparative Biology named their scholarship award for outstanding oral presentation in the division of animal behavior after her.

For 2022, she was awarded the BBVA Foundation Frontiers of Knowledge Award.
