= Elena Litchman =

Professor of aquatic ecology

- Education: Moscow State University, University of Minnesota
- Scientific career
- Thesis: Competition and coexistence of phytoplankton under fluctuating light (1997)
- Doctoral advisor: Robert W. Sterner and David Tilman

Elena Litchman is an American aquatic ecologist. She is a professor of aquatic ecology at Michigan State University known for her research on the consequences of global environmental change on phytoplankton. She was elected a fellow of the American Association for the Advancement of Science in 2025.

== Education and career ==
Litchman received an Honors Diploma in biology from Moscow State University, Russia, and a Ph.D. in ecology from the University of Minnesota in 1997. Following graduate work, Litchman held postdoctoral positions at the Smithsonian Environmental Research Center, the Swiss Federal Institute for Aquatic Science and Technology (Eawag), and Rutgers University. From 2003 to 2005, Litchman was a research scientist at Georgia Institute of Technology. In 2005, Litchman took a position in the Zoology Department of Michigan State University and the W.K. Kellogg Biological Station. She has been named a MSU Foundation Professor at Michigan State University where she works in the Department of Integrative Biology.

== Research ==
Litchman's Ph.D. research examined the impact of changing light levels on competition in phytoplankton. She introduced the use of trait-based ecology for phytoplankton in papers published in 2007 and 2008. Prior to these publications, trait-based ecology had been implemented in terrestrial science and Litchman was the first to apply these ideas to marine research. Key traits in phytoplankton include light, nutrient use, morphology, predation, and temperature, and Litchman has combined these traits to mathematically define phytoplankton community structure. Litchman's research has examined the connection between the size of phytoplankton over evolutionary time and nutrient limitation which, in turn, impacts marine food webs under changing climates. Through eco-evolutionary modeling, Litchman's research has shown that in the future warmer oceans will cause phytoplankton to shift towards polar regions.

=== Selected publications ===
- Litchman, Elena; Klausmeier, Christopher A.; Schofield, Oscar M.; Falkowski, Paul G. (2007). "The role of functional traits and trade-offs in structuring phytoplankton communities: scaling from cellular to ecosystem level". Ecology Letters. 10 (12): 1170–1181. doi:10.1111/j.1461-0248.2007.01117.x. ISSN 1461-0248. PMID 17927770.
- Litchman, Elena; Klausmeier, Christopher A. (October 31, 2008). "Trait-Based Community Ecology of Phytoplankton". Annual Review of Ecology, Evolution, and Systematics. 39 (1): 615–639. doi:10.1146/annurev.ecolsys.39.110707.173549. ISSN 1543-592X.
- Klausmeier, Christopher A.; Litchman, Elena; Daufresne, Tanguy; Levin, Simon A. (2004). "Optimal nitrogen-to-phosphorus stoichiometry of phytoplankton". Nature. 429 (6988): 171–174. Bibcode:2004Natur.429..171K. doi:10.1038/nature02454. ISSN 1476-4687. PMID 15141209. S2CID 4308845.

== Awards ==
- Presidential Early Career Award for Scientists and Engineers (PECASE) Award (2010) "For integration of theoretical and experimental studies to predict how global environmental change modifies physical processes and phytoplankton diversity and evolution within lakes, and for interdisciplinary training and outreach to K-12 teachers."
- Petersen Foundation Excellence Professorship Award, Germany (2017)
- G. Evelyn Hutchinson Award from the Association for the Sciences of Limnology and Oceanography (2021)
- Fellow of the Ecological Society of America (2025)
- Fellow of the American Association for the Advancement of Science (2025)
