= Wirth Lake (Minnesota) =

Lake in the state of Minnesota, United States

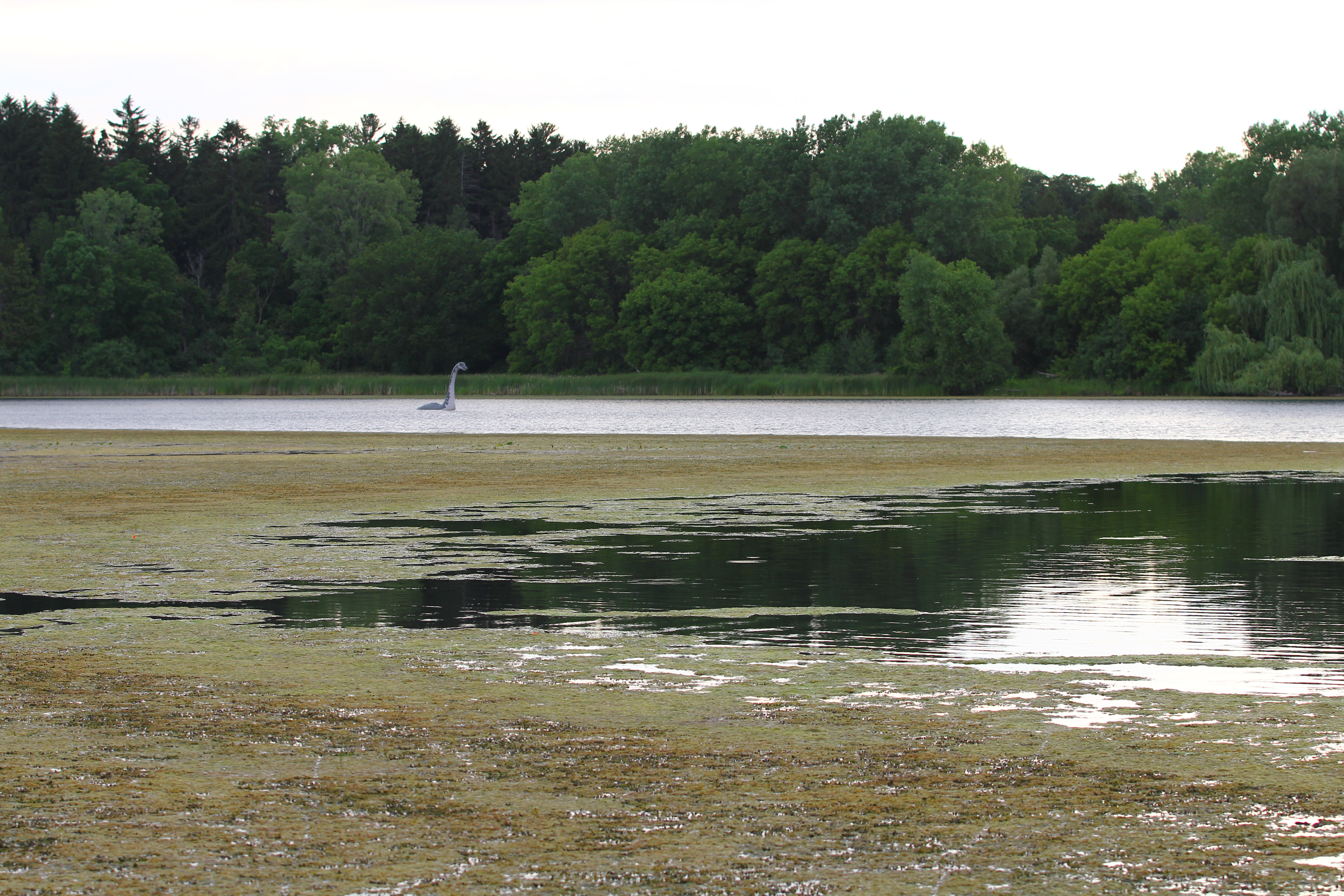
- Wirth Lake in 2012

- Location within Minnesota Location within the United States
- Location: Golden Valley, Minnesota, US
- Coordinates: 44°58′55″N 93°19′23″W
- Basin countries: United States

Wirth Lake is in Theodore Wirth Park, a large park managed by the Minneapolis Park and Recreation Board, but is actually in Golden Valley, a neighboring suburb.
