= Cedar Creek Ecosystem Science Reserve =

Ecological research site in Minnesota

- IUCN category IV (habitat/species management area)
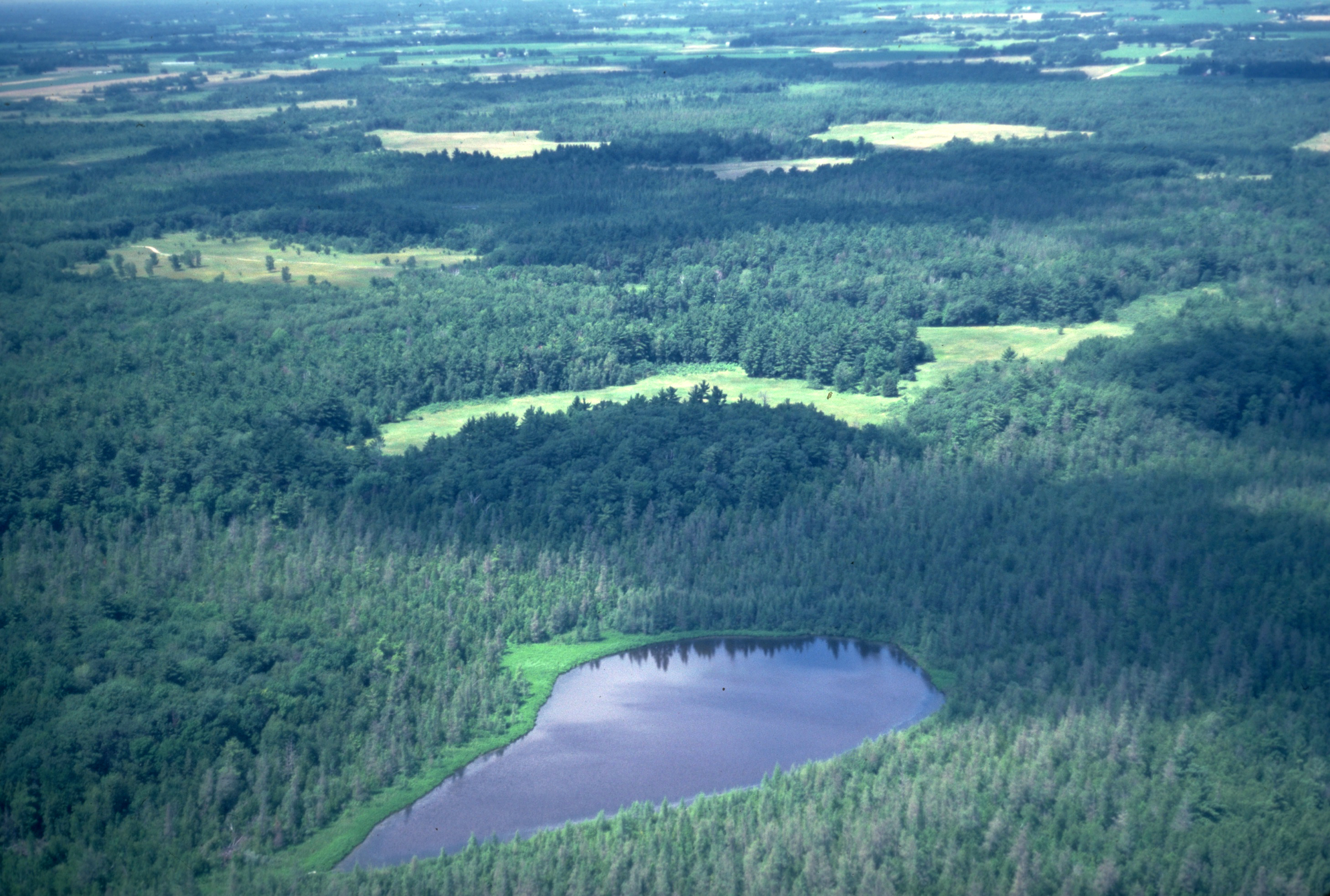
- View of Cedar Bog Lake with experimental plots in the rear

- Location within Minnesota Location within the United States
- Location: East Bethel, Minnesota, United States
- Coordinates: 45°24′7.29″N 93°11′57.85″W
- Area: 5,600 acres (23 km^{2})
- Established: 1942
- Governing body: College of Biological Sciences
- Website: Official website

U.S. National Natural Landmark
- Designated: June 1975

The Cedar Creek Ecosystem Science Reserve is an ecological research site located primarily in East Bethel, Minnesota in the counties of Anoka and Isanti on the northern edge of the Minneapolis-Saint Paul metropolitan area.

== Name ==
Originally the site was officially designated the Cedar Creek Forest which takes its name for Cedar Creek that winds through East Bethel. The bog where the site initially began was informally called by professors "Decodon Bog". The site was known as Cedar Creek Natural History Area until its change in 2007.

== Description ==
Encompassing 5,400 acres (22 km^{2}) of native upland forests and prairie and lowland swamps and meadows, the site contains over 900 plots of long-term experimental research which evaluate plant competition and biodiversity. The herbivory research division examines animal and plant relationships. Led by prominent American ecologist G. David Tilman, the University schedules more than 130 faculty, post-doctoral researchers, graduate students, staff, and undergraduate researcher interns to the site as of 2006.

Several citizen science programs are located at the Cedar Creek Ecosystem Science Reserve, including a Zooniverse project.

== History ==
Established in 1942 by the University of Minnesota, the site was designated a National Natural Landmark by the National Park Service in 1975 and 1980 under the Historic Sites Act. It received this designation in May 1975 from the United States Secretary of the Interior, giving it recognition as an outstanding example of the nation's natural history. The designation describes it as a

Relatively undisturbed area where three biomes meet (tall grass prairie, eastern deciduous forest and boreal coniferous forest), supporting 61 species of mammals and 259 species of birds. A nationally and internationally famous research center.

It was later designated by the National Science Foundation as a Long Term Ecological Research site in 1982. Minnesota ecologists purchased land parcels through 1929 until the University's acquisition in 1940. The site is currently operated by the University's College of Biological Sciences in cooperation with the Minnesota Academy of Science.

Cedar Creek Ecosystem Science Reserve is often considered to be the birthplace of the modern science of ecosystem ecology. This claim is attributed to limnologist Raymond Lindeman (1915-1942) who performed his PhD research on the ecological dynamics of Cedar Bog Lake located in the reserve. Linking Sir Arthur Tansley's coined term "ecosystem" to field research, his studies were influential in forming modern ecosystem ecology. Cedar Creek Ecosystem Science Reserve also tested the first radio collars for animal tracking in the 1960s and developed prescribed burning techniques for savannas.

== See also ==
- Martha Crone
- Cora Alta Ray Corniea
- William Skinner Cooper
- Eville Gorham
- Murray Fife Buell
- Helen Foot Buell
