= Eloise Butler =

American botanist and gardener (1851–1933)

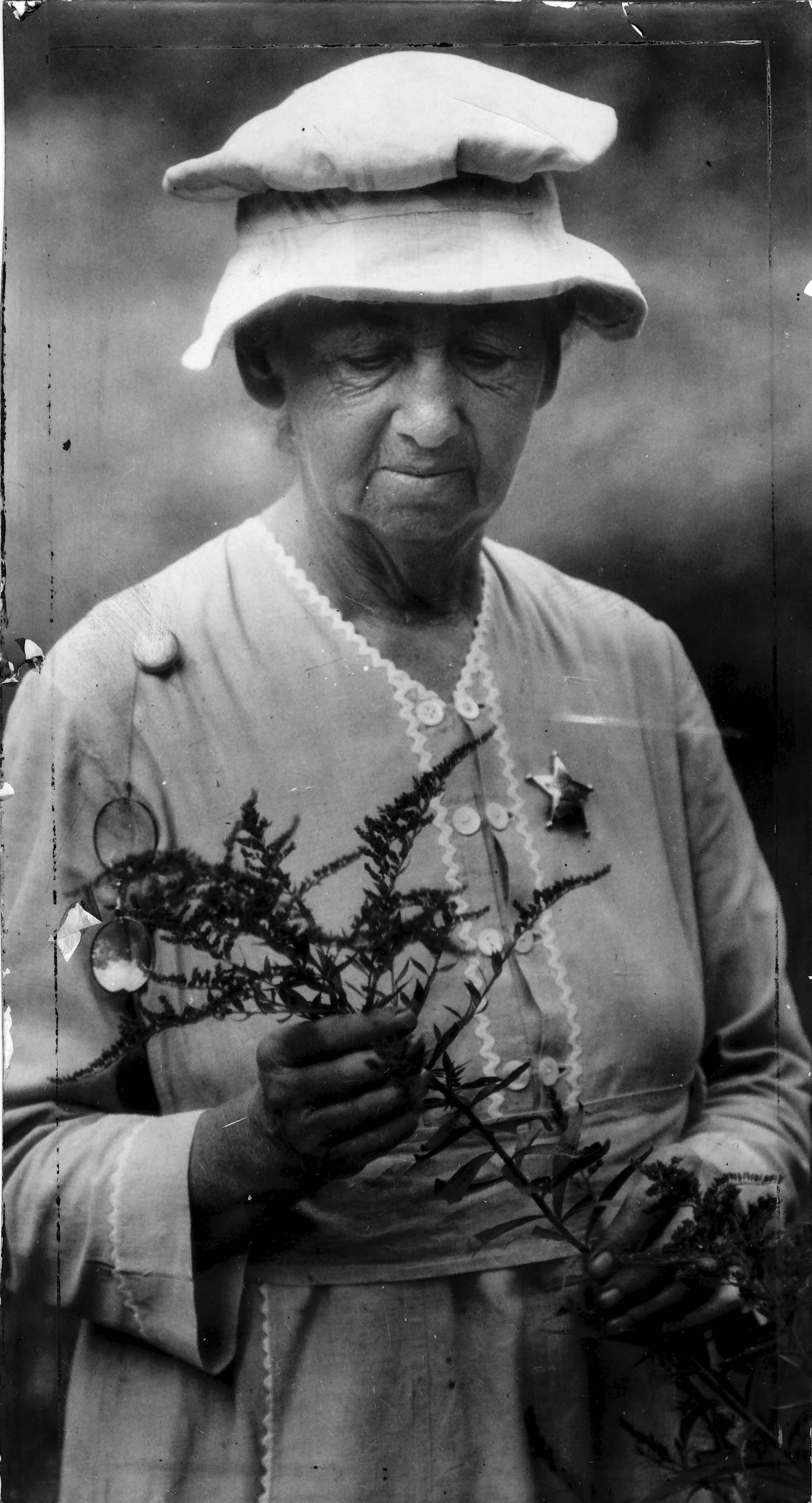
- Born: August 3, 1851; Appleton, Maine
- Died: April 10, 1933 (aged 81); Minneapolis, Minnesota, United States
- Resting place: Eloise Butler Wildflower Garden and Bird Sanctuary, Theodore Wirth Park, Minneapolis
- Education: Eastern State Normal School
- Known for: Botanical collecting and gardening

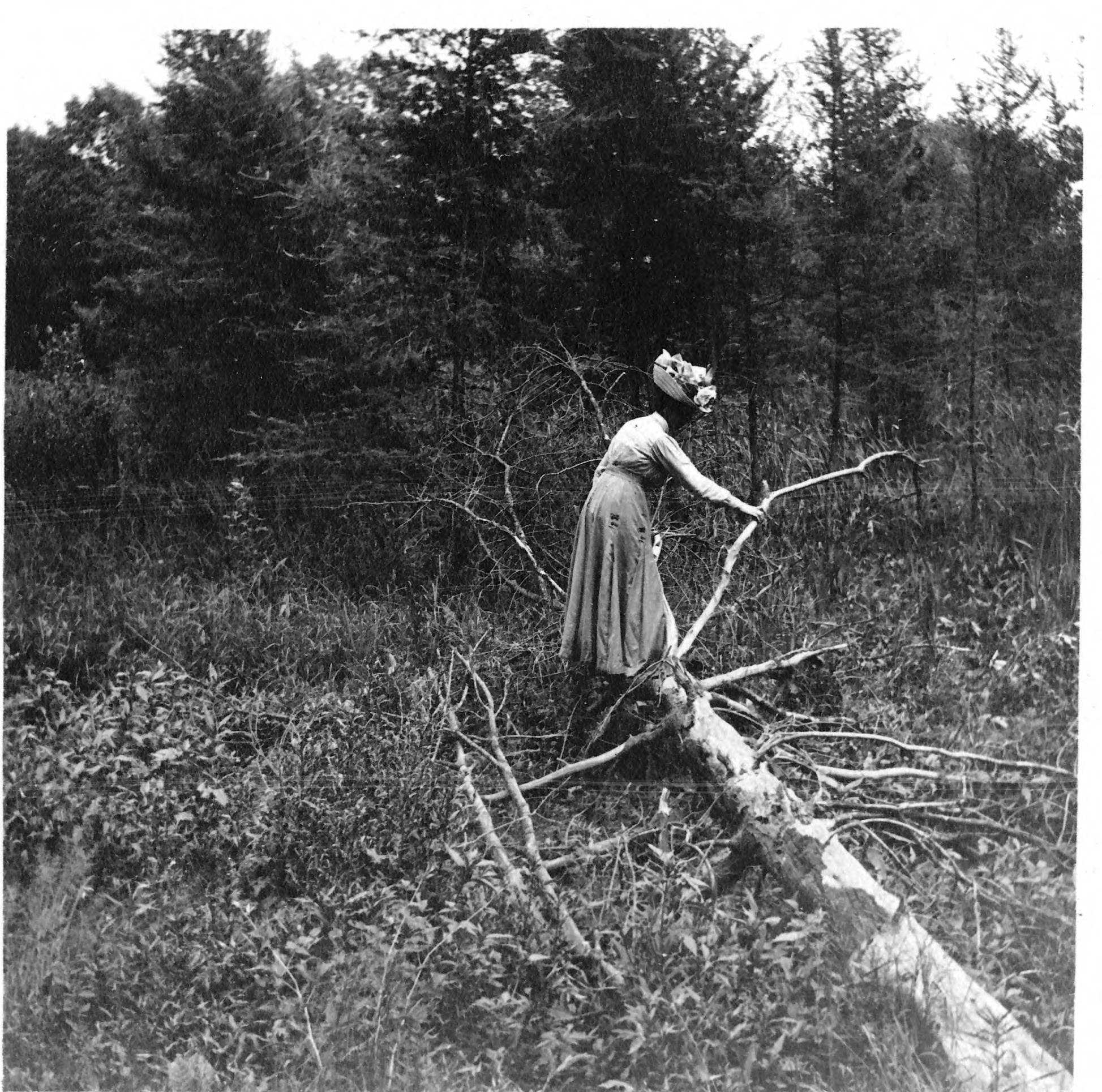
Butler crossing the swamp in Glenwood Park (1911)

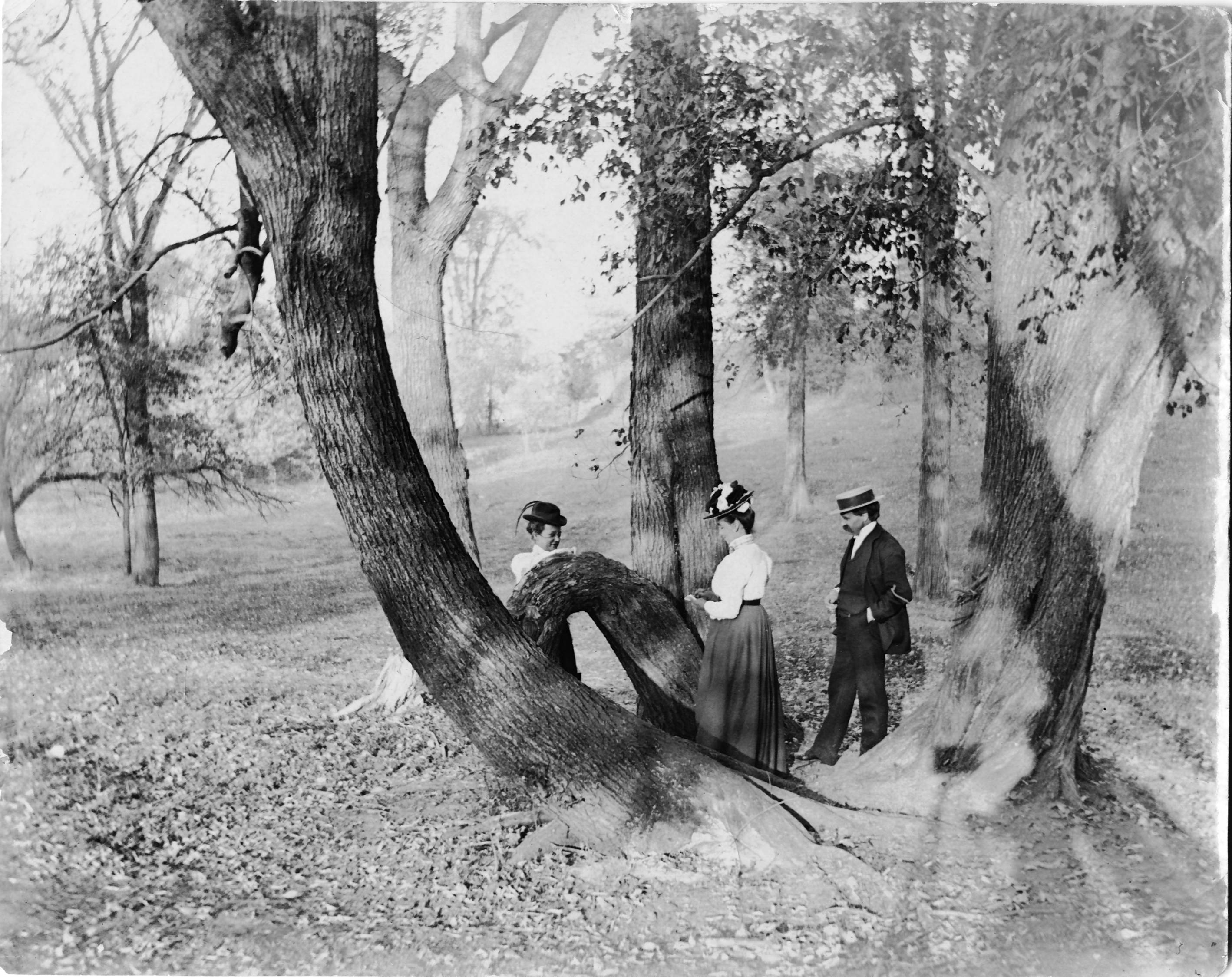
Studying a tree graft in Glenwood Park

Eloise Butler (1851–1933) was an American botanist, gardener and teacher. She was known for her role in founding the Eloise Butler Wildflower Garden and Bird Sanctuary, the oldest public wildflower garden in the United States, located in Theodore Wirth Park, Minneapolis. The garden was named after her in 1929.

== Teaching career ==
After graduating from high school in Lynn, Massachusetts, Butler was educated at the Eastern State Normal School, a teaching college located in Maine. By September 1874, she had moved with her parents to Minneapolis, Minnesota, where she mainly taught botany and history. One of her students at Central High School (CHS), Josephine Tilden, went on to become an expert on algae and was the first female scientist employed by the University of Minnesota.

The 1906 yearbook at South High School, where she had been a teacher, warned that students should avoid taking botany with Eloise Butler if they did not enjoy "10 mile walks through bog and swamp in quest of unobtainable flora", according to an article in the Minneapolis Star Tribune.

In 1911, she retired from her 37-year teaching career to become the first curator of the Minneapolis Wildflower Garden that she had helped to establish. Despite the length of her teaching career, she wrote that "in my next incarnation, I shall not be a teacher".

== Botany and gardening ==
Since her early years, Butler had been interested in botany. At the family farm in Appleton Ridge, she had learned the names and uses of plants that grew nearby from her aunt, according to an article in the Minnesota Star Tribune.

Butler had moved to Minneapolis, Minnesota in 1874 with her parents and, while living there, she acted on her interest in botany by attending classes at the University of Minnesota where she worked for certain professors, collecting samples and editing. Desmids, an order of algae, particularly interested her and she discovered a dozen new varieties - one of which, Cosmerium eloisenum, was named after her. She also made visits to hunt for plants in Jamaica, Woods Hole, and Vancouver Island (where the University had set up a research station), motivated by her interest in botany.

Butler played an important role in founding the Wild Botanic Garden in Minneapolis, by successfully petitioning the Minneapolis Park Board in 1907. This was motivated by her concern over environmental degradation resulting from development and its effects on native plant life. A further motivation for the garden's establishment was as a resource for botany students to observe the native flora.

After retiring from her teaching career, Butler became the first curator of the Wild Botanic Garden (as it was then named) in 1911 with a salary of US $50 per month paid by the Minneapolis Park Board and Minneapolis Women's Club. As the garden's curator, she collected flora native to Minnesota and transplanted it to the garden, recorded in her Garden Log - for example, orchids, asters, Cornus, and Drosera. In a 1926 paper about the garden, she described her approach to gardening, writing that "plants were to be allowed to grow according to their own sweet will and not as humans might wish them to grow". In earlier writings from 1910, she similarly described her approach as akin to the economic principle of laissez-faire, a term meaning "to let do".

To reflect her commitment to the garden, it was named after her in 1929 by the Minneapolis Park Board and became known as the "Eloise Butler Wildflower Garden". Later on, in 1968, the garden was renamed to the "Eloise Butler Wildflower Garden and Bird Sanctuary" at the request of its society of friends. The addition of "bird sanctuary" to the name was motivated by Butler's interest in birds - she logged her sightings at the garden, for example ruby-throated hummingbirds. As the garden's curator, Butler was succeeded by her friend, Martha Crone.

In addition to her role as curator of the Wildflower Garden, Butler wrote a column on gardening for the Minneapolis Tribune.

== Personal life ==
Eloise Butler was born in Appleton in rural Maine on August 3, 1851. Since her early years, she had been interested in botany. At the family farm in Appleton Ridge, she had learned the names and uses of plants that grew nearby from her aunt, according to an article in the Minnesota Star Tribune. Both of her parents were teachers and her sister, Cora Pease, was a botanist.

Butler died of a heart attack on April 10, 1933 at 81 years old, while she was on her way to the Wildflower Garden after which she was named. Her funeral was held on April 12 at Lakewood Chapel. On Arbor Day in 1934, a remembrance ceremony was held in the Garden. At the ceremony, a pin oak (Quercus palustris) was planted in her honour, a tablet installed to commemorate her, and her ashes were scattered.
