= Saara DeWalt =

American biologist

Saara J. DeWalt is an American biologist who specializes in plant ecology, and has co-authored over 50 peer-reviewed publications in scientific journals. She has been the dean of the College of Biological Sciences at the University of Minnesota since 2023, and was formerly the chair of the Department of Biological Sciences at Clemson University (2019–2023).

== Professional experience ==
DeWalt spent nearly 20 years at Clemson University's Department of Biology, starting as an assistant professor in 2005, gaining tenure in 2011 and being promoted to full professor in 2017. She served as interim chair of the department starting in 2018 before becoming chair in 2019.

Since 2023, DeWalt has been the dean of the College of Biological Sciences as well as a professor in the Department of Plant and Microbial Biology at the University of Minnesota-Twin Cities.

DeWalt has been actively involved in The Association for Tropical Biology and Conservation (ATBC) where she served as President-elect (2019), President (2020) and Past-President (2021). Earlier she was involved in creating mentoring circles to support new researchers and worked to increase broader regional inclusion in the organization.

== Scientific contributions ==
DeWalt studies forest ecosystems around the world, focusing on the neotropics. Her published papers cover a wide variety of topics directed at understanding the biodiversity, evolution and ecology of complex plant communities. Key questions addressed in her studies include trying to understand why some plants are invasive when introduced to new environments but are less abundant in their original environments. Her research also assesses forest succession patterns and impacts of species diversity and abundance on the health of forest communities.

== Education ==
- 1990–1994 – Honors AB in Biology, Brown University
- 1996–2003 – PhD in Biological Sciences, Minor in Experimental Statistics, Louisiana State University

== Representative publications ==
1. Schorn, M. E., S. Kambach, R. L. Chazdon, D. Craven, C. E. Farrior, J. A. Meave, R. Munoz, M. van Breugel, L. Amissah, F. Bongers, B. Herault, C. C. Jakovac, N. Norden, L. Poorter, M. T. van der Sande, C. Wirth, D. Delgado, D. H. Dent, S. J. DeWalt, J. M. Dupuy, B. Finegan, J. S. Hall, J. L. Hernandez-Stefanoni, O. R. Lopez, N. Rueger. 2024. Tree demographic strategies largely overlap across succession in Neotropical wet and dry forest communities. Ecology 105: e4321. DOI: 10.1002/ecy.4321
2. Taylor, B. N.*, E. Stedman, S. J. Van Bloem, S. L. Whitmire, and S. J. DeWalt. 2023. Widespread stem snapping but limited mortality caused by category 5 hurricane on the Caribbean Island of Dominica. Forest Ecology and Management 532: DOI: 10.1016/j.foreco.2023.120833.
3. Jakovac, C. C., and numerous co-authors including S. J. DeWalt. 2022. Strong floristic distinctiveness across Neotropical successional forests. Science Advances 8: DOI: 10.1126/sciadv.abn1767.
4. Poorter, L., and numerous co-authors including S. J. DeWalt. 2021. Functional recovery of secondary tropical forests. Proceedings of the National Academy of Sciences 118: DOI: 10.1073/pnas.2003405118.
5. Poorter, L., and numerous co-authors including S. J. DeWalt. 2019. Wet and dry tropical forests show opposite successional pathways in wood density but converge over time. Nature Ecology & Evolution 3:928–934.
6. Gei, M., and numerous co-authors including S. J. DeWalt. 2018. Legume abundance along successional and rainfall gradients in Neotropical forests. Nature Ecology & Evolution 2:1104–1111.
7. Chazdon, R. L., and numerous co-authors including S. J. DeWalt. 2016. Carbon sequestration potential of second-growth forest regeneration in the Latin American tropics. Science Advances 2: e1501639.
8. DeWalt, S. J., B. N. Taylor*, and K. Ickes. 2015. Density-dependent survival in seedlings differs among woody life-forms in tropical wet forests of a Caribbean island. Biotropica 47:310–319.
9. Woods, C. L.*, C. L. Cardelús, and S. J. DeWalt. 2015. Microhabitat associations of vascular epiphytes in a wet tropical forest canopy. Journal of Ecology 103:421–430.
10. Woods, C. L.*, and S. J. DeWalt. 2013. The conservation value of secondary forests for vascular epiphytes in central Panama. Biotropica 45:119–127.
11. DeWalt, S. J., E. Siemann, and W. E. Rogers. 2011. Geographic distribution of genetic variation among native and introduced populations of Chinese tallow tree, Triadica sebifera. American Journal of Botany 98:1128–1138.
12. DeWalt, S. J. 2006. Population dynamics and potential for biological control of an exotic invasive shrub in Hawaiian rainforests. Biological Invasions 8:1145–1158.
13. DeWalt, S. J., K. Ickes, R. Nilus, K. E. Harms, and D. F. R. P. Burslem. 2006. Liana habitat associations and community structure in a Bornean lowland tropical forest. Plant Ecology 136:203–216.
14. DeWalt, S. J., and J. Chave. 2004. Structure and biomass of four lowland Neotropical forests. Biotropica 36:7–19.
15. DeWalt, S. J., J. S. Denslow, and K. Ickes. 2004. Natural-enemy release facilitates habitat expansion of the invasive tropical shrub Clidemia hirta. Ecology 85:471–483.
16. DeWalt, S. J., S. A. Schnitzer, and J. S. Denslow. 2000. Density and diversity of lianas along a chronosequence in a central Panamanian tropical forest. Journal of Tropical Ecology 16:1–19.
