= Cora Alta Ray Corniea =

American conservationist

Cora Alta Ray Corniea (1889–1958) was an American conservationist best known for her role in preserving the Cedar Bog at what is now known as the Cedar Creek Ecosystem Science Reserve in Minnesota. Corniea was referred to as "The Bird Woman of Cedar Bog."

== Personal life ==
Born on October 10, 1889, in Albany, Missouri as Cora Alta Ray, Corniea cited her maternal grandparents, Samuel and Nancy Mize, and her paternal grandparents, Andrew and Rebecca Ray, for instilling her love of nature. Corneia lived in Kansas from 1900 to 1905, and moved to Minnesota in 1913. She married Dr. Albert Corniea on February 3, 1917, and they lived in Minneapolis for 35 years. Corniea died in Minneapolis on July 20, 1958. She was buried in Lakewood Cemetery.

== Work and legacy ==
Corniea was a charter member of the Minnesota's Natural History Society. When recruiting new members, Corniea was well known for her "persistence" decades before Sen. Mitch McConnell's calling out of Sen. Elizabeth Warren's persistence became a feminist meme. While Corniea's involvement in the Natural History Society lasted for decades, it was her foundational role in preserving the Cedar bog: "If only one person could be held responsible for beginning the crusade to save the Cedar Bog, that individual would be Cora Corniea". During the 1930s, 1940s, and 1950s, Corniea actively acquired, or pursued donations, of land from local farmers. Meanwhile, she advocated for the creation of public ownership and stewardship of the preserve for this critical environmental habitat in Minnesota, encompassing oak savannah, deciduous forest and coniferous forest. In 1940, the Cedar Creek Reserve was established. It was declared a National Natural Landmark by the National Park Service in 1975. It has become a key location for long term ecological studies.
