= Theodore Wirth Park =

Urban park in Minneapolis

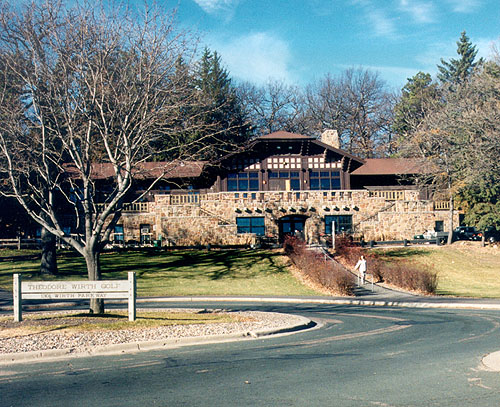
- Golf lodge at Theodore Wirth Park
- Interactive map of Theodore Wirth Park
- Type: Urban park
- Location: Minneapolis and Golden Valley, Minnesota, United States
- Coordinates: 44.99°N 93.323°W
- Area: 759 acres (307 ha) (3.07 km^{2})
- Created: 1889
- Status: Open all year

Theodore Wirth Park is the regional park located in Minneapolis and Golden Valley, Minnesota, United States. Formally named Theodore Wirth Regional Park, it includes two golf courses (an 18-hole course and a 9-hole par 3 course), Wirth Lake, Birch Pond, cross-country ski trails, mountain biking trails, snow tubing hills, and other amenities. The park is managed by the Minneapolis Park and Recreation Board and forms a significant portion of the Grand Rounds Scenic Byway, linking the Chain of Lakes area with the Victory Memorial Parkway.

== History ==
The park that became known as Theodore Wirth Park was established in 1889 with an initial acquisition of 66 acres (270,000 m^{2}), initially called Saratoga Park and named Glenwood Park in 1890. In 1908, MPRB folded the garden into Glenwood Park and began further expansion to the north and west, using authorization from the Minnesota Legislature to expand into Golden Valley. In 1938, the park was renamed for Theodore Wirth, who was superintendent of Minneapolis parks for 30 years from 1906 to 1936.

The park currently occupies 759 acres (3.07 km^{2}), which is 90% of the size of New York City's Central Park at 843 acres (3.41 km^{2}).

== Events ==
The pool at the park hosted the Aqua Follies during the annual Minneapolis Aquatennial summer festival from 1940 until 1964.

The park was the venue for the 2024 Stifel Loppet Cup international cross-country ski competition.

== Features ==
A geographic marker at one corner of the park grounds, at Wirth Parkway and Golden Valley Road, marks the 45 degrees latitude line, exactly halfway between the equator and the North Pole. The badly weathered plaque was refurbished around 2006.

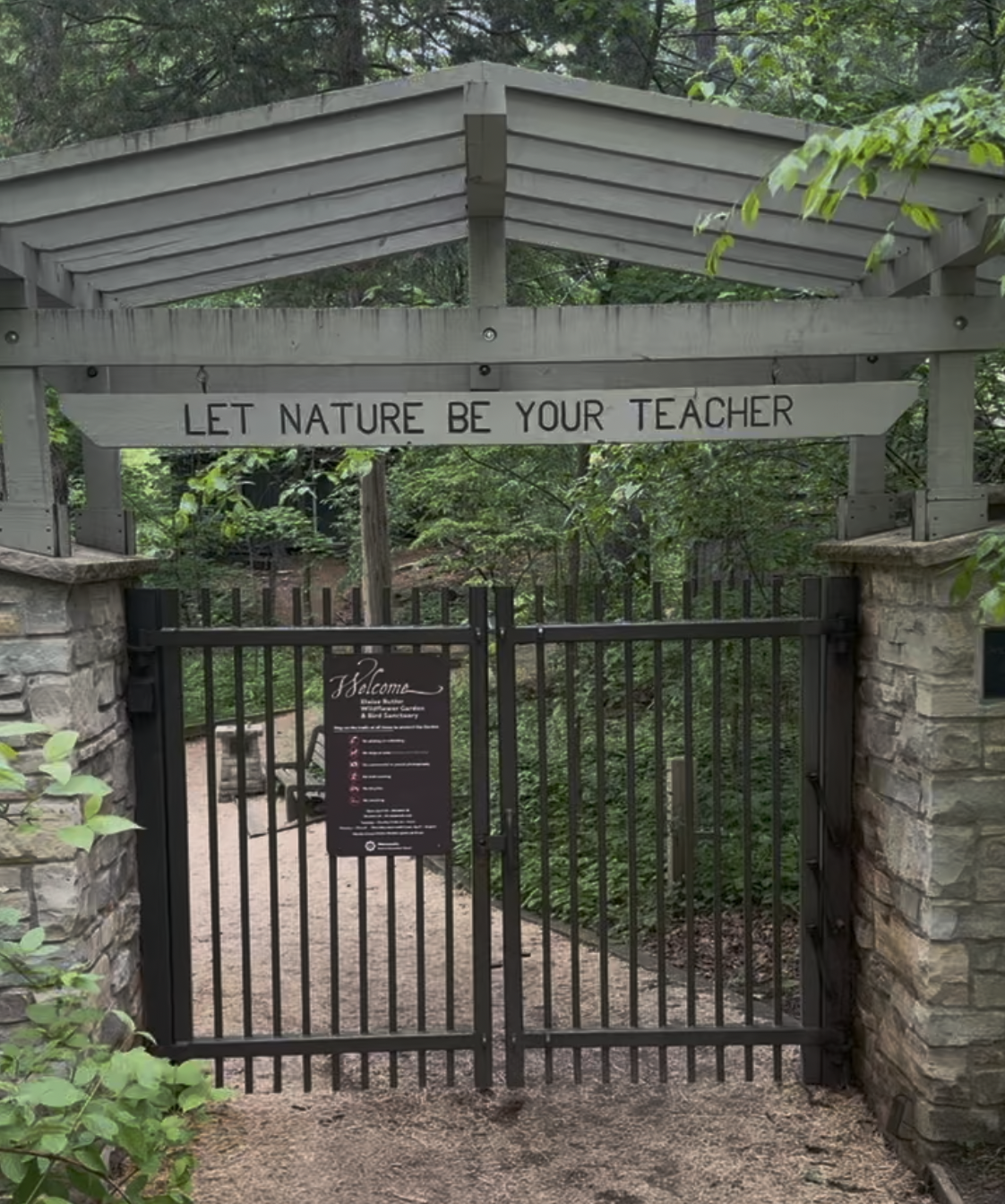
Gated entrance to garden, "Let nature be your teacher."

=== Golf course ===
In the northern portion of Wirth Park sits a golf course, including one 18-hole course and one 9-hole par 3 course. The golf course was established in 1917 and its clubhouse constructed in 1923. In 2011, disc golf was added to the par 3 course. In the winter, much of the park is repurposed to cross country ski trails.

=== Eloise Butler Wildflower Garden and Bird Sanctuary ===
In 1907 Eloise Butler, John Greer and others petitioned the Minneapolis Park and Recreation Board for space in Glenwood Park to establish a botanical garden. The park board granted the request and set aside three acres of bog, meadow and hillside for the Wild Botanical Garden, the first public wildflower garden in the United States. The garden was renamed after Butler, also the garden's first curator, in 1929.

== Gallery ==
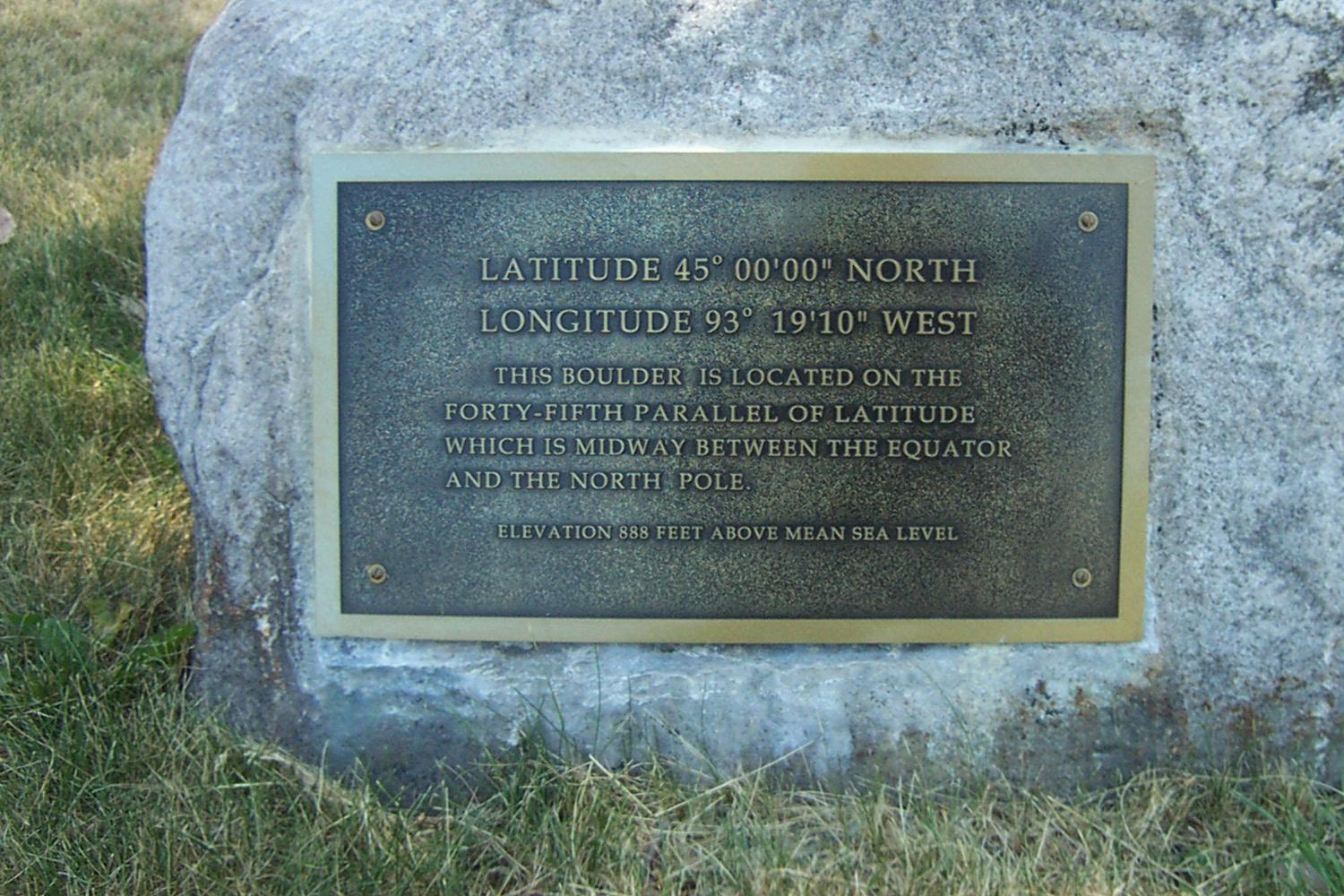
45th Parallel marker

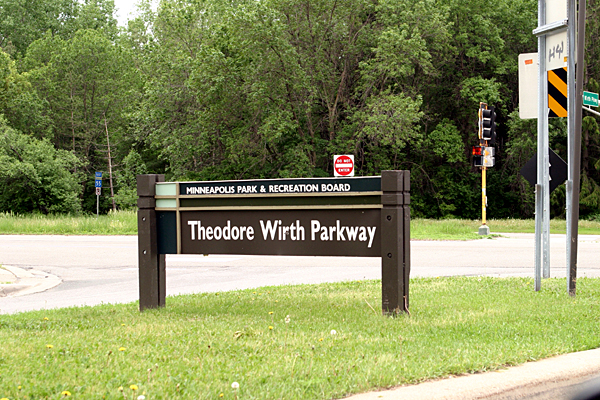
A sign along the Parkway

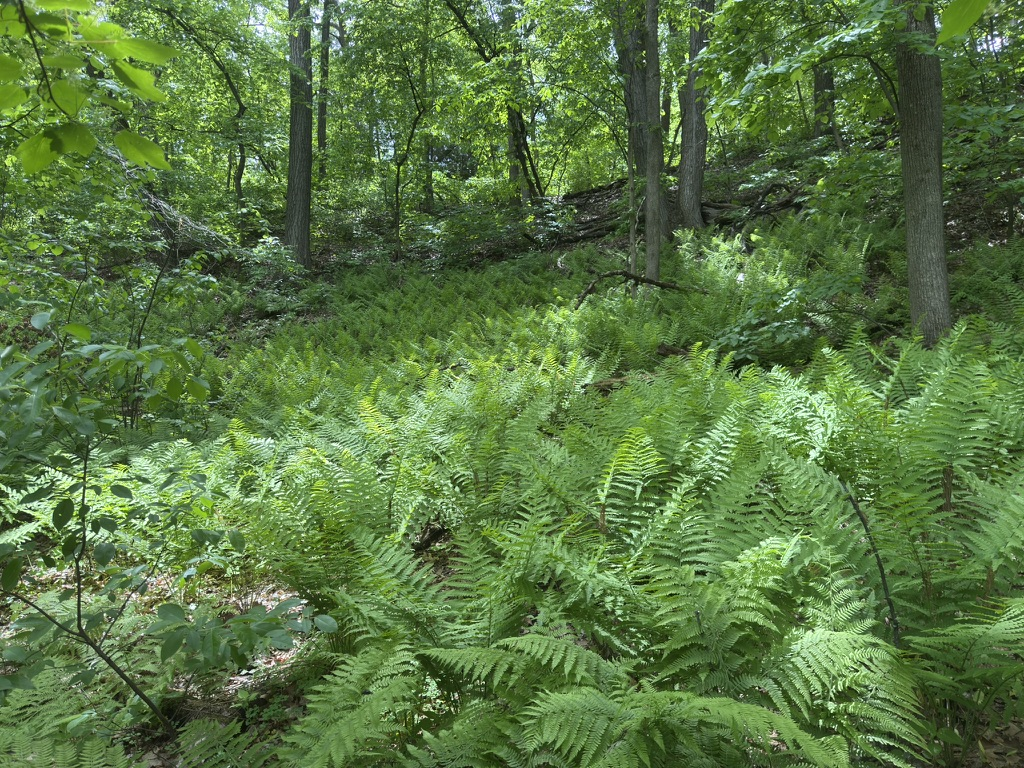
Ferns

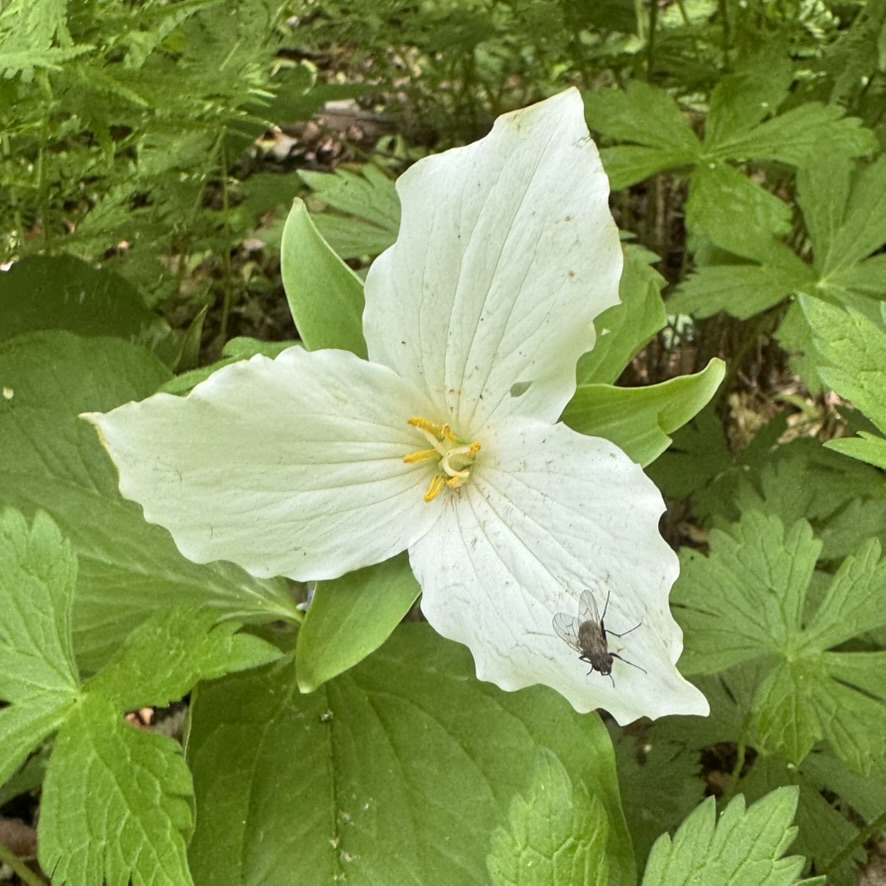
Trillium

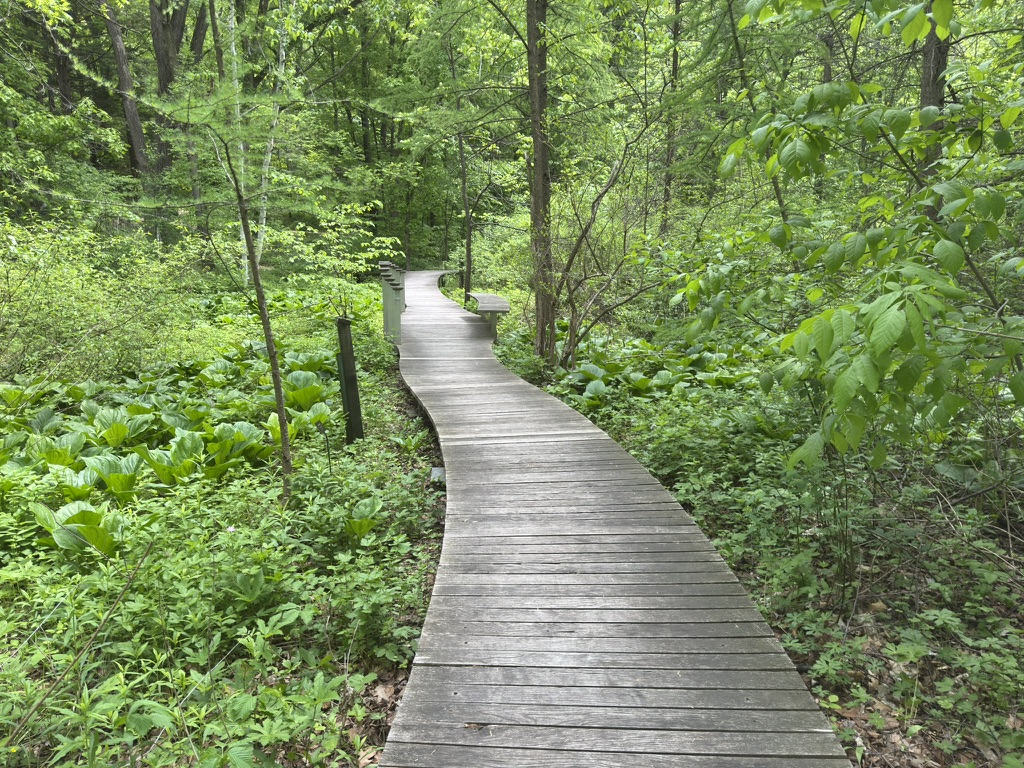
Boardwalk

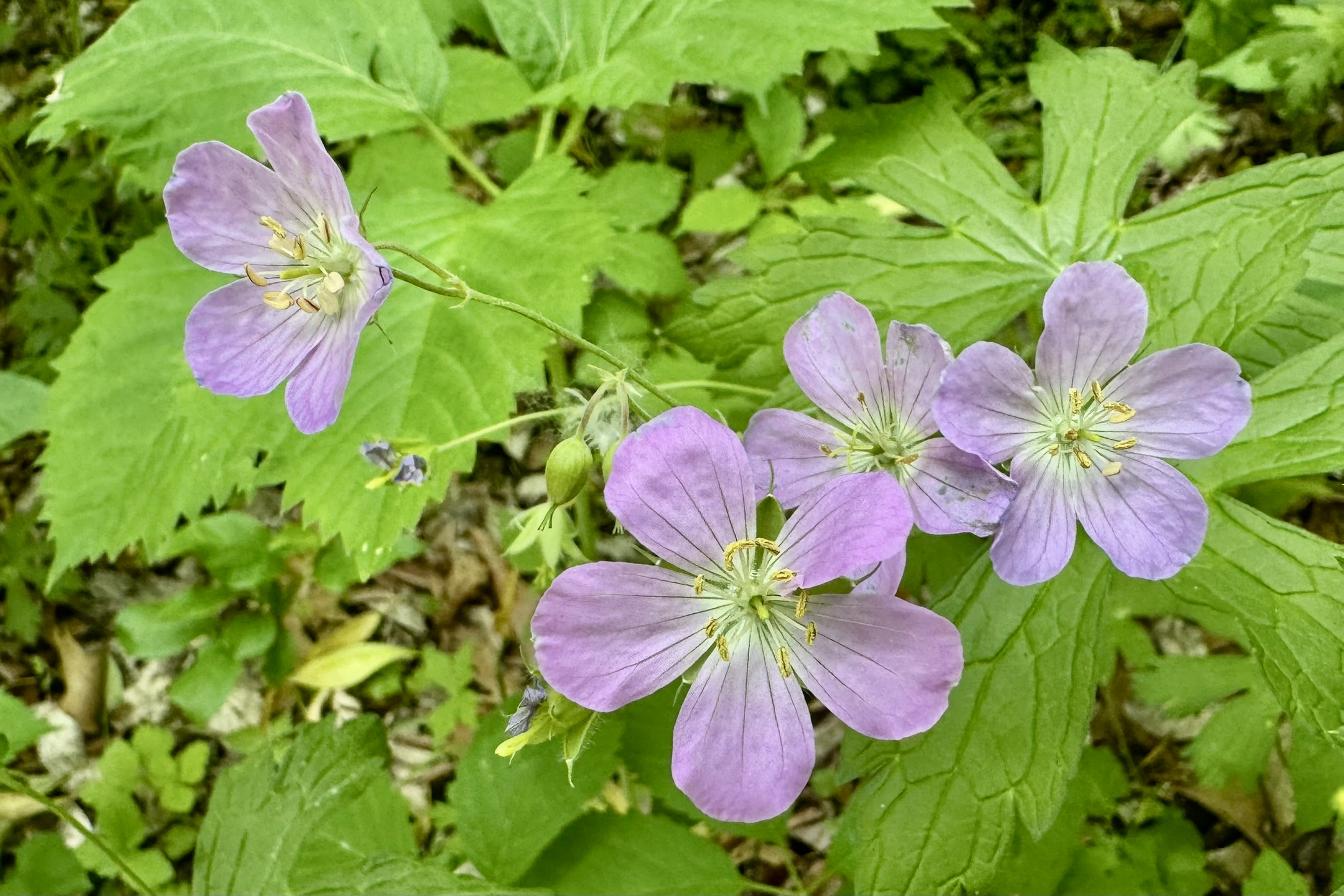
Geranium maculatum

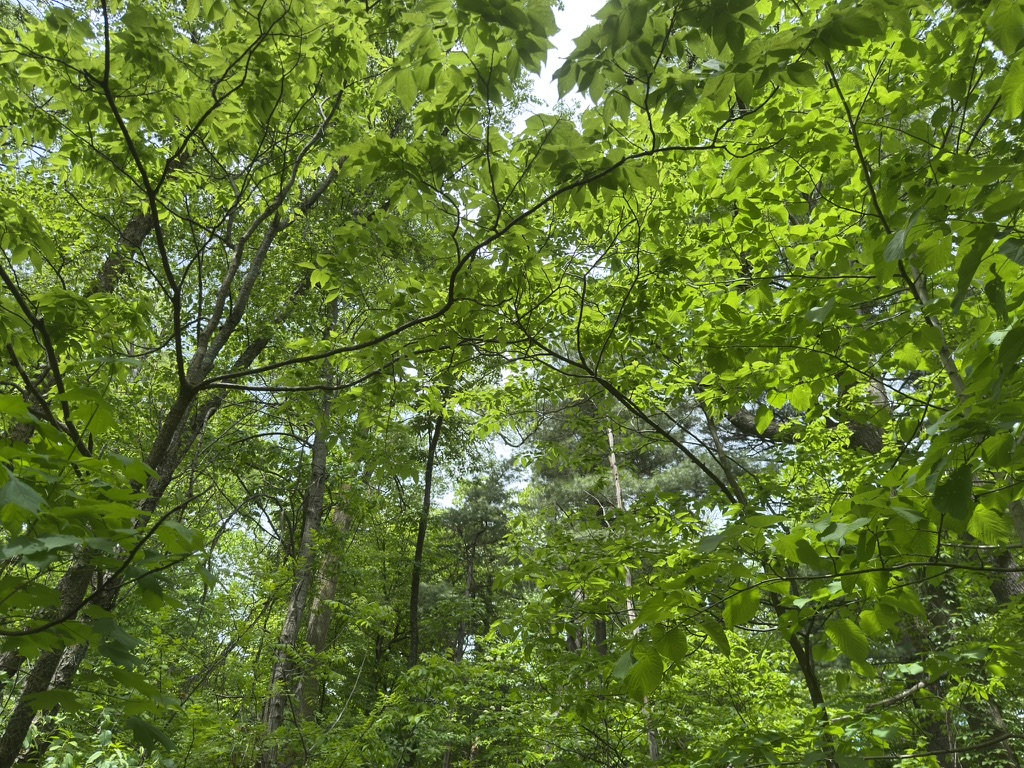
Forest canopy

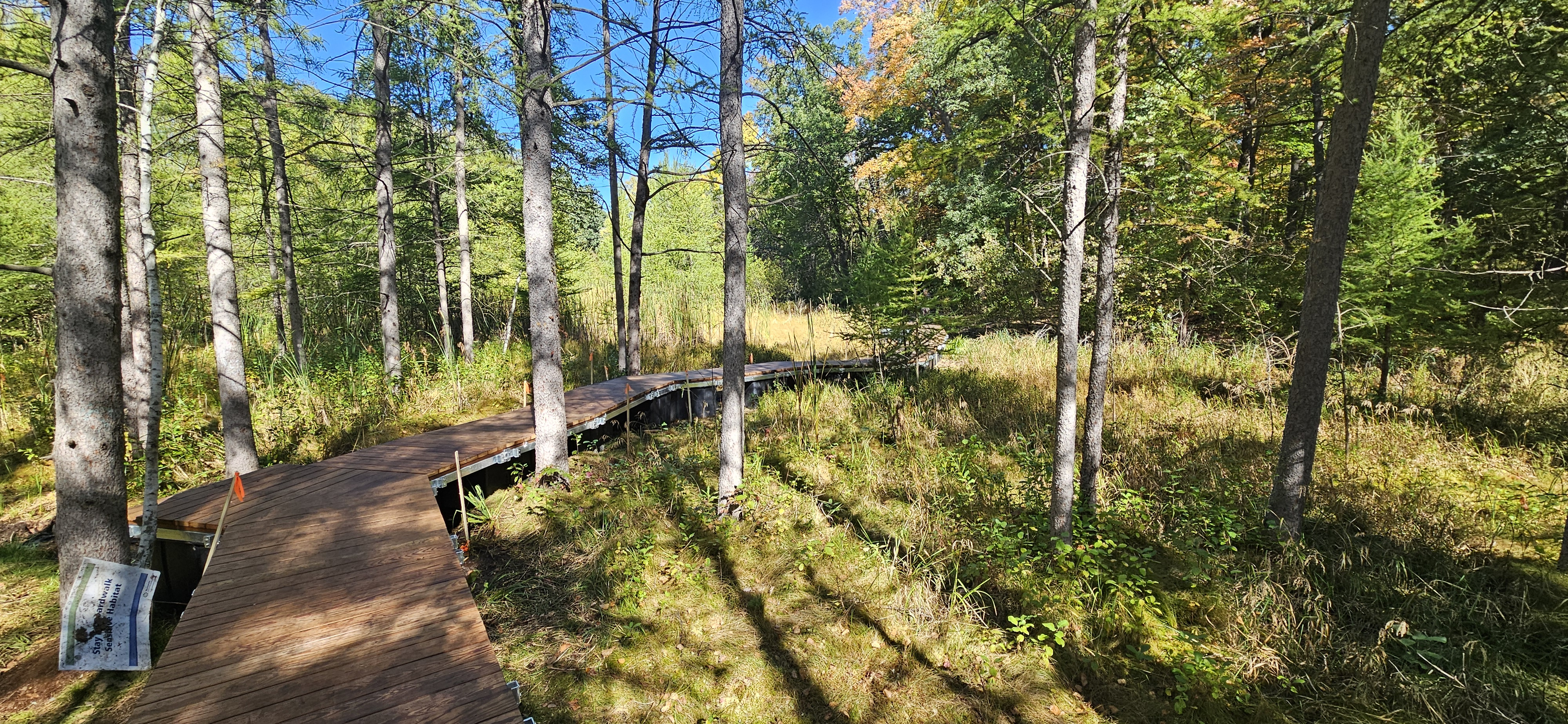
A new boardwalk
