= Nancy Johnson (engineer) =

American automotive engineer and materials scientist

Nancy L. Johnson is an American automotive engineer and materials scientist. She works for General Motors Research and Development as a lab group manager and technical fellow, and co-directs the General Motors / University of Michigan Smart Materials and Structures Collaborative Research Laboratory. Her work at General Motors involves the use of composite materials and smart materials in automotive applications.

Johnson became a Fellow of the American Society for Composites in 2003. She has chaired the Aerospace Division of the American Society of Mechanical Engineers (ASME), and was named as an ASME Fellow in 2005. She was the 2019 recipient of the ASME Adaptive Structures and Material Systems Award.
