= Nancy Collins Johnson =

American earth scientist

- Education: University of Wisconsin–Madison; University of Minnesota
- Scientific career
- Workplaces: Northern Arizona University; Lund University; Czech University of Life Sciences Prague
- Thesis: Plant and soil regulation of mycorrhizae in natural and agricultural ecosystems (1991)
- Doctoral advisor: G. David Tilman
- Website: Johnson Soil Lab

Nancy Collins Johnson is an American earth scientist who is the Regents’ Professor and Director of the School of Earth Sciences & Environmental Sustainability at Northern Arizona University. Her work considers soil microbial ecology and the study of mycorrhizal fungi. She was elected a Fellow of the American Association for the Advancement of Science in 2020.

== Early life and education ==
Johnson studied biology at the University of Minnesota. She moved to the University of Wisconsin–Madison for her graduate studies, where she majored in botany. She became interested in mutualistic symbiosis, and was encouraged by Michael Adams to explore mycorrhiza. Whilst in Wisconsin, Johnson had the opportunity to research arbuscular mycorrhizae (AM). Whilst she initially struggled to characterise the fungi she had collected from the Jackson County Iron mine, she eventually worked with Mike Miller at the Argonne National Laboratory. After graduating, Johnson returned to the University of Minnesota, where she started her doctoral studies with G. David Tilman. Her doctoral research considered the regulation of mycorrhizae and impact of fertilisers. She studied the mycorrhizae in the Cedar Creek Ecosystem Science Reserve. In 1993 Johnson showed that fertilisation of soil created AM fungal communities that are 'inferior mutualists'. Johnson continued to collaborate with her early advisor Mike Miller throughout her career, investigating the function of mycorrhizae.

== Research and career ==
Johnson started her independent scientific career at the Northern Arizona University, where she was made Regents' Professor in 2016. She spent 2003 as a Fulbright Program Research Fellow in Lund University and 2011 a Fulbright Program Fellow at the Czech University of Life Sciences Prague. She has applied her understanding of AM fungi to sorghum crops.

In 2020 Johnson took a sabbatical, and was awarded a Bullard Fellowship in the Harvard Forest. Her research proposal involved a comparative study of microbiomes of AM symbioses.

== Awards and honours ==
- 2008 co-chair of the International Society of Mycorrhizas
- 2013 Elected Fellow of the Ecological Society of America
- 2018 Ecological Society of America Deborah A. Neher Career Award
- 2020 Elected Fellow of the Association for the Advancement of Science

== Selected publications ==
- Johnson, N. C.; Graham, J. H.; Smith, F. A. (1997). "Functioning of mycorrhizal associations along the mutualism–parasitism continuum". The New Phytologist. 135 (4): 575–585. doi:10.1046/j.1469-8137.1997.00729.x. ISSN 1469-8137.
- Moore, John C.; Berlow, Eric L.; Coleman, David C.; Ruiter, Peter C. de; Dong, Quan; Hastings, Alan; Johnson, Nancy Collins; McCann, Kevin S.; Melville, Kim; Morin, Peter J.; Nadelhoffer, Knute (2004). "Detritus, trophic dynamics and biodiversity". Ecology Letters. 7 (7): 584–600. Bibcode:2004EcolL...7..584M. doi:10.1111/j.1461-0248.2004.00606.x. ISSN 1461-0248.
- Hoeksema, Jason D.; Chaudhary, V. Bala; Gehring, Catherine A.; Johnson, Nancy Collins; Karst, Justine; Koide, Roger T.; Pringle, Anne; Zabinski, Catherine; Bever, James D.; Moore, John C.; Wilson, Gail W. T. (2010). "A meta-analysis of context-dependency in plant response to inoculation with mycorrhizal fungi". Ecology Letters. 13 (3): 394–407. Bibcode:2010EcolL..13..394H. doi:10.1111/j.1461-0248.2009.01430.x. ISSN 1461-0248. PMID 20100237.

== Personal life ==
Johnson has two children, a daughter and a son.
