= Kellogg Biological Station =

Satellite campus of Michigan State University

Coordinates: 42.40537°N 85.4012°W

- Kellogg Biological Station and Experimental forest
- Location: Barry County, MI
- Nearest city: Hickory Corners, MI
- Area: 4,100 acres (17 km^{2})
- Governing body: Michigan State University, National Science Foundation

Kellogg Biological Station (KBS), Michigan State University's largest off-campus education complex, is located in Ross Township south of Hickory Corners, Michigan (about 65 miles (105 km) from the main campus). Many of the facilities there were originally built by Will Keith Kellogg of Kellogg's cereal, after whom the station is named. KBS includes nearly 16.5 square kilometres (4,100 acres) of land and, together with nearby state lands and preserves, allows for large-scale studies by biologists. The National Science Foundation has a Long-Term Ecological Research site at KBS.

KBS offers classes to undergraduate and graduate students in biology-related fields, including the Enhancing Linkages between Mathematics and Ecology (ELME) program, which consists of three weeks of mathematics and four weeks of field work.

== W.K. Kellogg Manor House ==
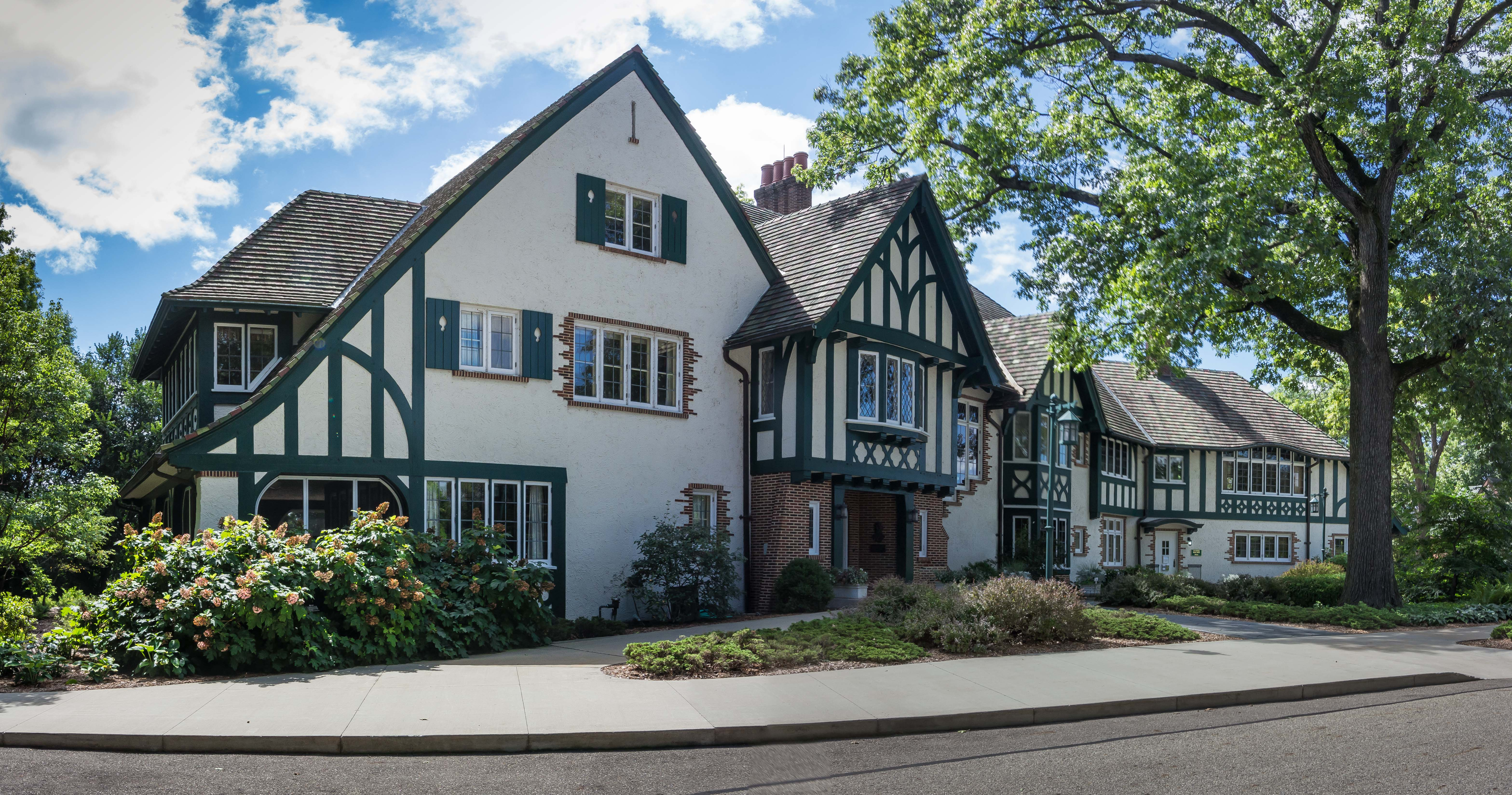
W.K. Kellogg House

A prominent feature of the Biological Station is W.K. Kellogg's Manor House. It is located at 3700 E. Gull Lake Drive, Hickory Corners, Michigan. Situated 110 feet (34 m) above Gull Lake, it has spectacular lake views.

The Manor House was designed by the architectural firm of Benjamin and Benjamin. Built in 1925, the Manor House served as a summer home for W.K. Kellogg and his second wife Dr. Carrie Staines. They lived there until 1942. Designed in a Tudor Revival inspired style. It has leaded glass bay windows, oak coffered ceilings, a Ludowici roof, and Rookwood tile installed in the bathrooms and fireplaces. The 32-acre (13-hectare) estate also includes a Carriage house, green house with potting shed, a caretaker's cottage, boathouse, an authentic Dutch windmill and several beautiful gardens.

Kellogg then gave permission for the house to be used by the Coast Guard as an induction and training center. With the end of World War II a need for rehabilitation centers arose. As the number of wounded soldiers rose, the Manor House was converted into an estate for injured veterans. In 1951 ownership of the estate changed hands. Upon Mr. Kellogg's death, the Manor House and its surrounding land was given to Michigan State University. From the 32 acres (13 hectares) and outbuildings the Kellogg Biological Station was formed. In 1998 a grant was given by the Kellogg Foundation to restore the Manor House to its original state the project was completed. The two-story home is now used for conferences and weddings.

== Kellogg Bird Sanctuary ==
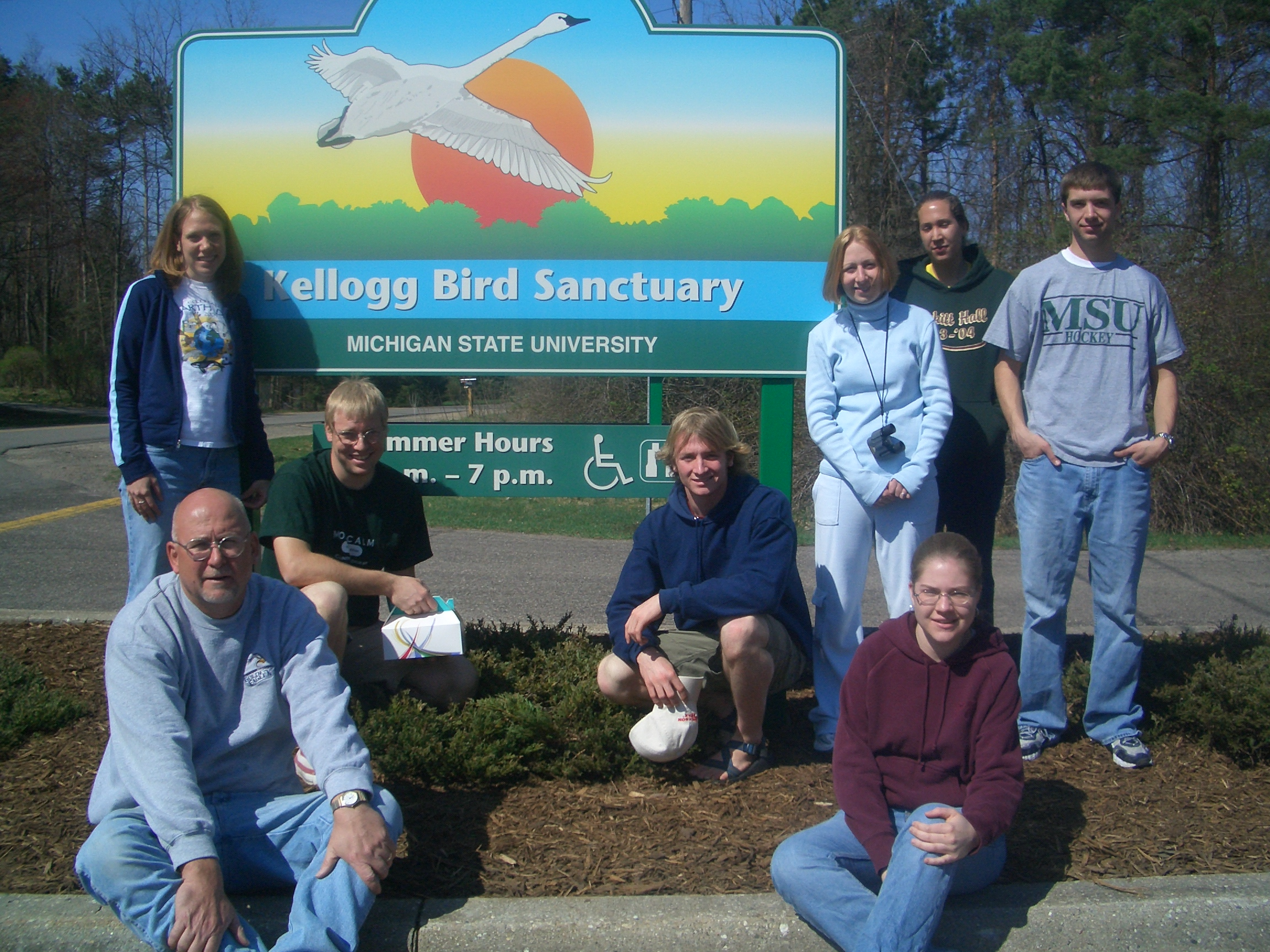
Group of Cornerstone University ornithology students at Kellogg Bird Sanctuary

A destination at the biological station is the Bird Sanctuary. Modeled after a similar wildlife refuge in Canada, the Bird Sanctuary is home to many wild birds and waterfowl, including trumpeter swan, Canada geese, diving and dabbling ducks, herons, cranes, songbirds, and more. The Sanctuary has been an integral part in re-establishing both Canada goose and trumpeter swan populations to the Midwest, serving as an important flyway stop for migrating birds. The Sanctuary also houses captive birds of prey and game birds on-site. Originally opened as a refuge in 1927, the sanctuary was donated to the Michigan State College of Agriculture and Applied Science (now Michigan State University) in 1928 to be used for research and education. The Sanctuary remains a popular stop for visitors, offering tours, courses and programs to the public year-round.

== Kellogg Experimental Forest ==
7060 N. 42nd St., Augusta. Established on abandoned agricultural land in 1932, the 716-acre Forest is known worldwide for research on tree breeding and genetics, planting techniques, and plantation establishment and management. Much of the research that developed the Spartan spruce, a hybrid that combines the color and drought resistance of a blue spruce and the softer needles and rapid growth rate of the white spruce, was done at the Kellogg Forest. The forest is open to the public for biking, hiking, jogging, horseback riding and cross-country skiing and also has more than 15 miles of interpretive trails. Bow hunting, trout fishing and picnicking also are permitted.

== Gull Lake Library ==
An MSU branch library, also known as the Gull Lake Library, is part of Michigan State University's W.K. Kellogg Biological Station. The Gull Lake Library contains over 12,000 volumes, many of which are bound journal volumes.

Roughly 150 current serial titles are received. The collection supports the research interests of KBS faculty, staff, students and visiting scientists in aquatic and terrestrial ecology, evolution, behavior and agro-ecology.

The first director of the station, Dr. Walter F. Morofsky, was an entomologist with MSU. Today the library has a large historical entomology collection. Early Bird Sanctuary research and teaching led to a good waterfowl collection. Once the year round research station was established in 1965, and the branch library was established, a strong research program in limnology began. Currently, there are strong research programs in limnology, microbial ecology, plant ecology, agricultural ecology, fish ecology and vertebrate behavioral ecology.
