= G. David Tilman =

American ecologist (born 1949)

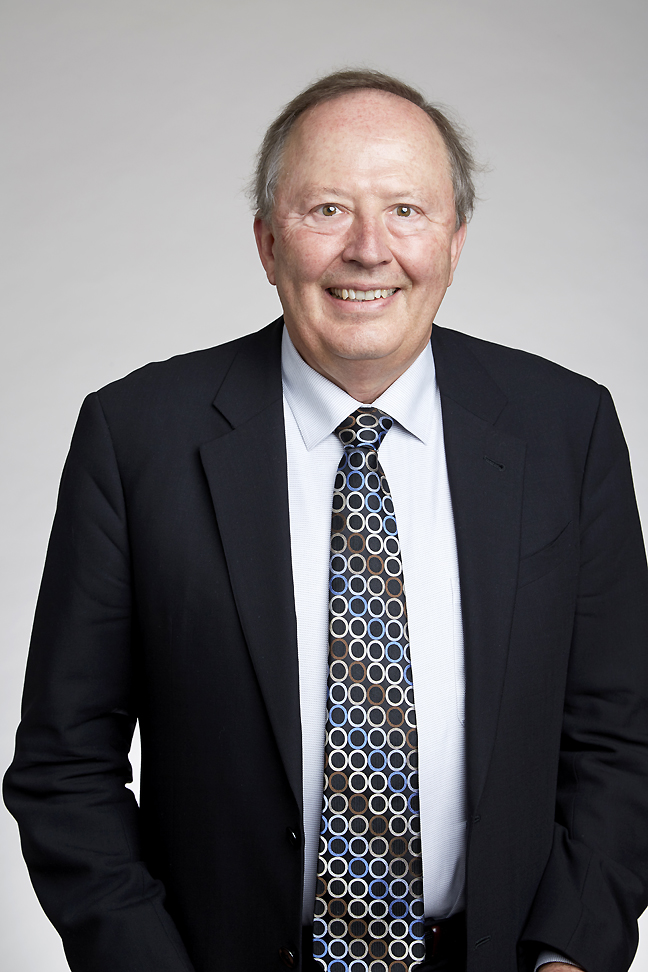
- Tilman in 2017
- Born: George David Titman; July 22, 1949 (age 77)
- Education: University of Michigan
- Awards: BBVA Foundation Frontiers of Knowledge Award (2014); Foreign Member of the Royal Society (2017)
- Scientific career
- Workplaces: University of Minnesota; University of California, Santa Barbara
- Thesis: Interspecific competition for resources: An experimental and theoretical study (1976)
- Doctoral students: Nancy Collins Johnson; Evan Siemann; Elena Litchman; Christopher Klausmeier
- Website: cbs.umn.edu/contacts/g-david-tilman

George David Tilman (born Titman July 22, 1949), is an American ecologist. He is Regents Professor and McKnight Presidential Chair in Ecology at the University of Minnesota and Distinguished Professor at the University of California, Santa Barbara's Bren School of Environmental Science & Management. He was elected to the U.S. National Academy of Sciences in 2002, and to the U. K. Royal Society as a Foreign Member in 2017 and awarded the U. S. National Medal of Science in 2025.

== Early life and education ==
Tilman was born in Aurora, Illinois in 1949 and was originally named George David Titman, a surname he changed to Tilman in 1976. As a young child he lived with his parents and three sisters in nearby Naperville, Illinois, where his father worked as a college treasurer the family moved to Michigan when Tilman was six, settling in a house on the shore of Lake Michigan, where he spent much of his childhood exploring the beach, dunes, and woods. He has said that this early, sustained exposure to the outdoors along with a Little League baseball habit of wandering off in the outfield to look at insects and plants, which earned him the nickname “Little Professor” helped draw him toward a career studying nature. He earned his Bachelor of Science degree in zoology in 1971 and his PhD in ecology in 1976 at the University of Michigan. Some of his doctoral research was published in the journal Science. In an August 2001 interview, Tilman said that his passion for ecology stems from his love for both math and biology, and that ecology is a field that allows him to express both together along with his love for the outdoors.

== Research ==
Tilman is best known for his work on the role of resource competition in community structure, on the role of biodiversity in ecosystem functioning, and on ways to reduce the environmental impacts of agriculture. One of his most cited articles is the 1994 Nature article on biodiversity and stability in grasslands, which was based on data from an experiment begun in 1982 with more than 200 grassland plots at the Cedar Creek Ecosystem Science Reserve in Minnesota. The 1988 drought showed a strong positive correlation between plant diversity and the stability of ecosystem productivity, supporting the previously dismissed diversity stability hypothesis. Another widely cited article is his 1994 Ecology paper showing that many species can coexist in a habitat even when they compete for the same limiting nutrient, as long as there is a tradeoff between competitive ability and colonizing ability. In a related 1994 Nature paper, Tilman used this model to demonstrate the phenomenon of “extinction debt,” the time delay between habitat destruction and the eventual extinction of species.

=== Recent research ===
Since the 1990s, Tilman's research has increasingly focused on sustainable agriculture, biofuels, and how growing global food demand can be met while protecting biodiversity and the climate. In Minnesota, a corn growing state, he showed that native high diversity grasslands could yield more usable energy per hectare than corn grain ethanol or soybean biodiesel, while also storing carbon in soils and requiring fewer inputs. His later work, including a 2002 paper in Nature, a 2011 paper in the Proceedings of the National Academy of Science, and a 2017 paper in Nature, examine how the world's food demand can be met while minimizing species extinction risk and the greenhouse gas emissions otherwise associated with global agriculture, and how diversified cropping and dietary change can improve both human health and environmental sustainability.

=== Citation impact and publications ===
Tilman is recognized as the most highly cited ecologist and environmental scientist in the world. Essential Science Indicators (Web of Science) designated him the most highly cited environmental scientist of the decade across successive decades, including 1991–2000 and 2001–2010, and the National Science and Technology Medals Foundation notes that he has held this distinction for every decade since 1990.

As of 2026, Tilman's publications have been cited more than 287,000 times according to Google Scholar, with an h-index of 194, and with more than 100,000 of those citations accrued in the preceding five years alone.

Over his career Tilman has published roughly 300 scientific papers, including more than 40 in Nature and Science, and has authored two books and edited five more.

== Cedar Creek Ecosystem Science Reserve ==
Tilman served as director of the Cedar Creek Ecosystem Science Reserve from 1992 until stepping down in 2023, a tenure spanning 31 years. The roughly 5,400 acre research station north of the Twin Cities is part of the U.S. Long Term Ecological Research (LTER) network and is the site of the long running grassland biodiversity experiments that underpin much of his work. His large scale experiments there examine the effects of human-induced environmental change including biodiversity loss, nitrogen deposition, habitat destruction, and climate change on the functioning of ecosystems.

Among the best known of these are the long term nitrogen addition experiment (e001), established in 1982, and the “Biodiversity II” experiment (e120, also known as BioDIV), planted in 1994, which manipulates the number of plant species across more than 150 grassland plots and is one of the longest running biodiversity ecosystem function experiments in the world.

== Editorial roles ==
Tilman was named a Pew Fellow in Conservation and the Environment (Pew Marine Fellows Program) in 1995, and used the fellowship to launch the journal Issues in Ecology in collaboration with the Ecological Society of America, of which he became Founding Editor, to communicate ecological science to policymakers and the public. He has also served on the editorial boards of Science and the Proceedings of the National Academy of Sciences, among other publications.

== Policy engagement ==
Tilman has worked to bring ecological research to bear on public policy, giving invited testimony to congressional committees and serving on multiple White House scientific advisory panels, including biodiversity and biofuel related panels of the President's Committee of Advisors on Science and Technology (PCAST). He was also a commissioner on the EAT Lancet Commission on healthy diets from sustainable food systems, a multidisciplinary group of scientists whose 2019 report in The Lancet proposed a global “planetary health diet” intended to meet nutritional needs while keeping food production within environmental limits.

== Awards and honors ==
In 2008, Tilman was awarded the International Prize for Biology, presented in Tokyo in the presence of the Emperor of Japan and administered by the Japan Society for the Promotion of Science to recognize outstanding contributions to the advancement of research in fundamental biology.

In 2014, he was awarded the Balzan Prize for Basic Applied Plant Ecology by the International Balzan Prize Foundation, recognizing his contributions to theoretical and experimental plant ecology that underpin much of the current understanding of how plant communities are structured and interact with their environment.

In 2025, Tilman received the National Medal of Science, the highest U.S. honor for scientific achievement, presented at a White House ceremony on January 3, 2025. The medal recognized him for quantifying biodiversity's key role in preserving a resilient planet, and spreading the message to policymakers for action, honoring research showing that biodiversity is a major determinant of ecosystem stability, productivity, and resilience, with applications to sustainable agriculture and renewable energy.

Tilman is also a 2020 laureate of the Blue Planet Prize, awarded by Japan's Asahi Glass Foundation for outstanding contributions to solving global environmental problems, in recognition of his work demonstrating that biodiversity loss undermines ecosystem productivity and stability and his subsequent research connecting agriculture, diet, and environmental sustainability.

== Selected awards ==
- 1996: Robert H. MacArthur Award
- 2002: Elected to the U.S. National Academy of Sciences
- 2008: International Prize for Biology
- 2010: Dr A.H. Heineken Prize for Environmental Sciences
- 2012: Elected Fellow of the Ecological Society of America
- 2013: Alexander von Humboldt Medal
- 2014: Ramon Margalef Prize in Ecology
- 2014: Balzan Prize for Basic/Applied Plant Ecology
- 2014: BBVA Foundation Frontiers of Knowledge Award
- 2017: Elected a Foreign Member of the Royal Society (ForMemRS)
- 2020: Blue Planet Prize
- 2025: National Medal of Science

== Personal life ==
Tilman met his wife, Catharine (“Cathie”), while they were both students, and the two married before he began graduate school. Outside of his research, he has named woodworking, sailing, canoeing, walking in the woods, cycling, and photography among his interests, and has said that maintaining a balance between his scientific career and family life has been a guiding personal principle.
