= 2021 Minneapolis City Council election =

Minneapolis City Council election, 2021
- November 2, 2021

All 13 seats on the Minneapolis City Council 7 seats needed for a majority
- Turnout: 54.0% (▲11.6pp)
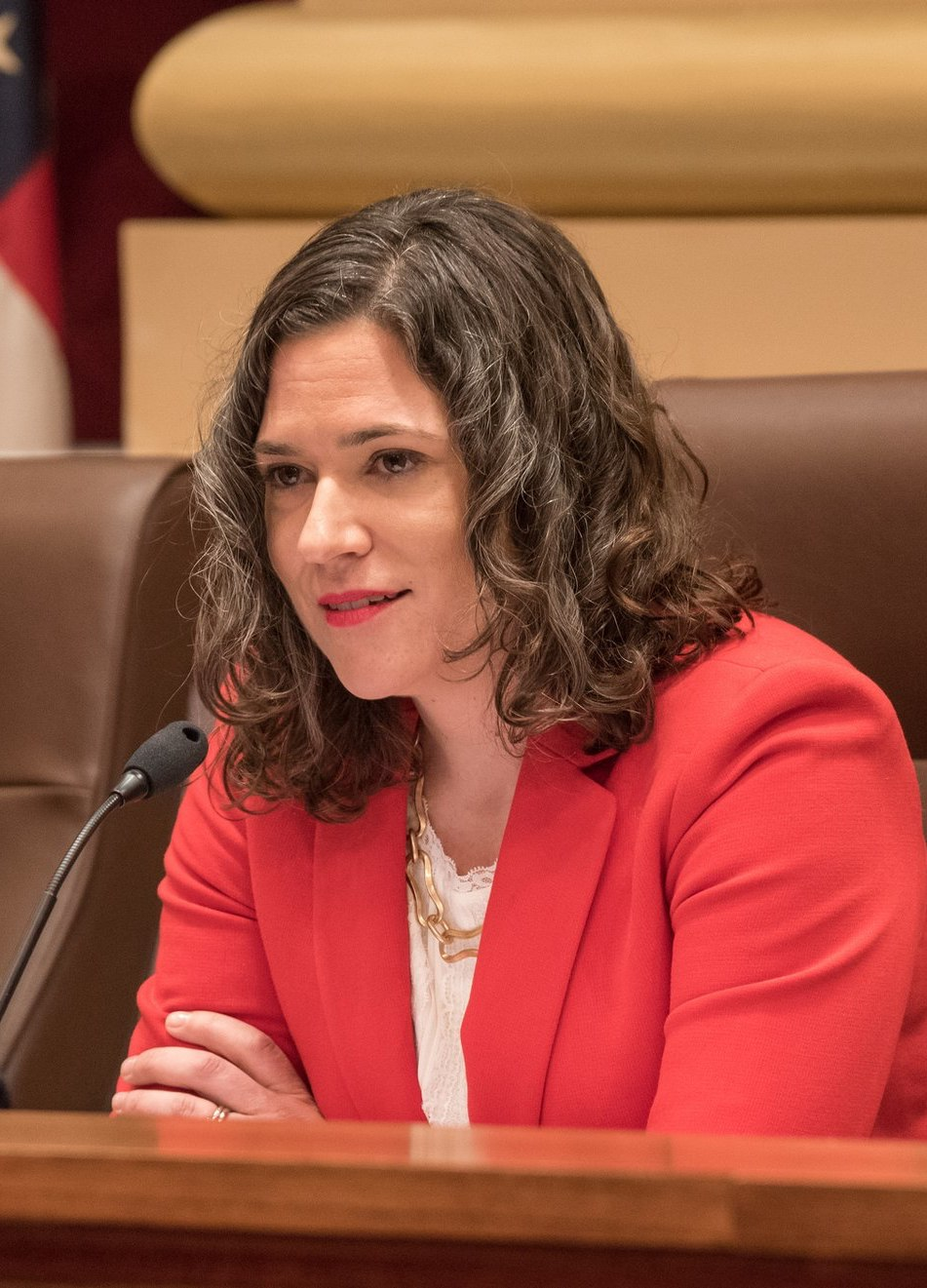

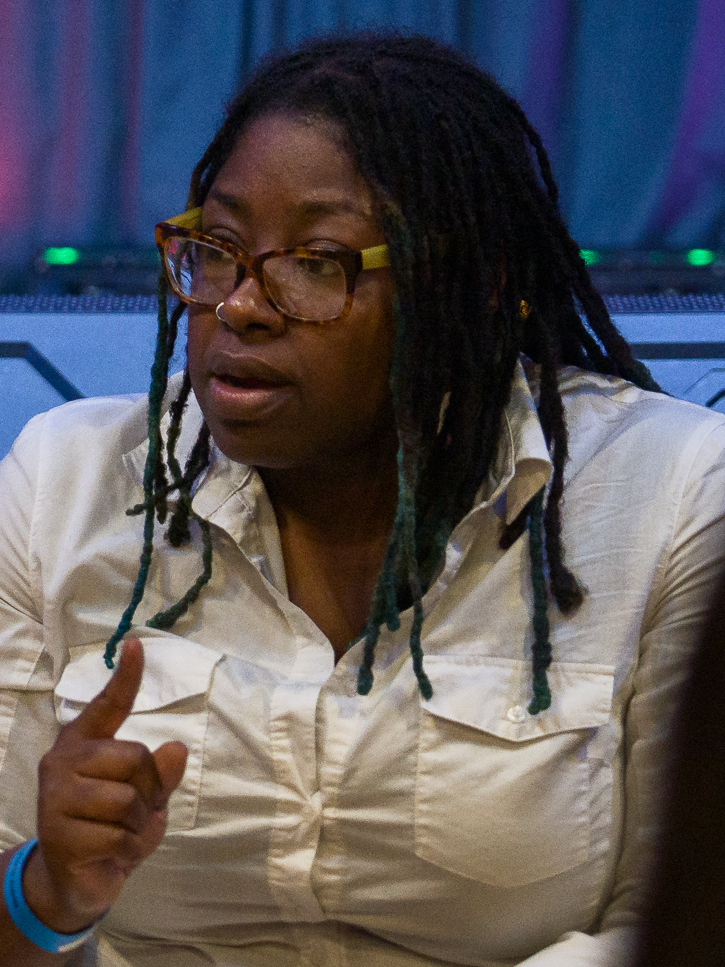
	Majority party	Minority party
Leader	Lisa Bender (retiring)	Robin Wonsley Worlobah
Party	Democratic (DFL)	Democratic Socialists (DSA)
Leader's seat	Ward 10	Ward 2
Last election	12 seats, 82.69%	0 seats, did not contest
Seats won	12	1
Seat change	Steady	▲1
Popular vote	115,277	3,061
Percentage	86.0%	2.3%
Swing	▲3.2 pp	▲2.3 pp
- Winning party's vote share by ward.
President before election
Lisa Bender
Democratic (DFL)
Elected President
Andrea Jenkins
Democratic (DFL)

An election were held in Minneapolis on November 2, 2021, to elect representatives for all 13 wards of the Minneapolis City Council. These elections occurred alongside the mayoral race and several other municipal offices, including Park Board and Board of Estimate and Taxation positions. The council elections were conducted using a ranked-choice voting system, which allows voters to rank candidates by preference on their ballots.

Amid a backdrop of significant local and national events, including the ongoing impact of the COVID-19 pandemic and social unrest following the murder of George Floyd in 2020, candidates across the wards ran on various platforms, addressing key issues such as public safety reform, housing, economic recovery, and the city's approach to policing.

The DFL garnered an overwhelming 85% of the 1st choice votes, a 3 percentage point increase from the previous election. The remaining seat was taken by Democratic Socialist candidate Robin Wonsley (Ward 2), who beat incumbent Green Party council member Cam Gordon in one of the only two known Condorcet cycles in United States electoral history.

Overall, moderates gained a net one seat on the 13-member council. This change suggests that moderates will have increased influence over key decisions on issues such as police reform and rent control. While progressives managed to secure seats in Wards 1 and 9, they suffered losses in Wards 3, 4, and 11, where moderate challengers defeated progressive incumbents who had supported the now-failed charter amendment to dismantle the Minneapolis Police Department.

== Retiring members ==
=== DFL ===
- Alondra Cano, Ward 9
- Lisa Bender, Ward 10

== Candidates ==
Ward	Incumbent			Candidates		
Ward	Name	Party	First elected	Name	Party	Party endorsement
1	Kevin Reich	DFL	2009	Elliott Payne	DFL	Minneapolis DFL
1	Kevin Reich	DFL	2009	Kevin Reich	DFL	
1	Kevin Reich	DFL	2009	Calvin Carpenter	Veterans	
1	Kevin Reich	DFL	2009	Thomas Wortman	DFL	
2	Cam Gordon	Green	2005	Cam Gordon	Green	Fifth District Green Party
2	Cam Gordon	Green	2005	Robin Wonsley Worlobah	DSA	Twin Cities DSA
2	Cam Gordon	Green	2005	Yusra Arab	DFL	
2	Cam Gordon	Green	2005	Tom Anderson	DFL	
2	Cam Gordon	Green	2005	Guy T. Gaskin	Republican	
3	Steve Fletcher	DFL	2017	Steve Fletcher	DFL	
3	Steve Fletcher	DFL	2017	Hope Hennessey	Independent	
3	Steve Fletcher	DFL	2017	Merv Moorhead	DFL	
3	Steve Fletcher	DFL	2017	Michael Rainville	DFL	
4	Phillipe Cunningham	DFL	2017	Phillipe Cunningham	DFL	Minneapolis DFL
4	Phillipe Cunningham	DFL	2017	LaTrisha Vetaw	DFL	
4	Phillipe Cunningham	DFL	2017	Leslie Davis	We the People	
5	Jeremiah Ellison	DFL	2017	Jeremiah Ellison	DFL	
5	Jeremiah Ellison	DFL	2017	Suleiman Isse	DFL	
5	Jeremiah Ellison	DFL	2017	Victor Martinez	DFL	
5	Jeremiah Ellison	DFL	2017	Elijah Norris-Holliday	Independent	
5	Jeremiah Ellison	DFL	2017	Kristel Porter	DFL	
5	Jeremiah Ellison	DFL	2017	James Seymor	Witness	
5	Jeremiah Ellison	DFL	2017	Cathy Spann	DFL	
6	Jamal Osman	DFL	2020	Abdirizak Bihi	DFL	
6	Jamal Osman	DFL	2020	Jamal Osman	DFL	
7	Lisa Goodman	DFL	1997	Lisa Goodman	DFL	Minneapolis DFL
7	Lisa Goodman	DFL	1997	Nick Kor	DFL	
7	Lisa Goodman	DFL	1997	Teqen Zéa-Aida	DFL	
7	Lisa Goodman	DFL	1997	Joanna Diaz	DFL	
8	Andrea Jenkins	DFL	2017	Andrea Jenkins	DFL	Minneapolis DFL
8	Andrea Jenkins	DFL	2017	Robert Sullentrop	Republican	
9	Alondra Cano	DFL	2013	Jason Chavez	DFL	Minneapolis DFL; Twin Cities DSA
9	Alondra Cano	DFL	2013	Jon Randall Denison	Social Justice	
9	Alondra Cano	DFL	2013	Alfred "AJ" Flowers, Jr	DFL	
9	Alondra Cano	DFL	2013	Yussuf Haji	DFL	
9	Alondra Cano	DFL	2013	Carmen Means	DFL	
9	Alondra Cano	DFL	2013	Mickey Moore	DFL	
9	Alondra Cano	DFL	2013	Brenda Short	DFL	
9	Alondra Cano	DFL	2013	Ross Tenneson	Republican	
10	Lisa Bender	DFL	2013	Aisha Chughtai	DFL	Twin Cities DSA
10	Lisa Bender	DFL	2013	Katie Jones	DFL	
10	Lisa Bender	DFL	2013	Alicia Gibson	DFL	
10	Lisa Bender	DFL	2013	Ubah Nur	DFL	
10	Lisa Bender	DFL	2013	Chris Parsons	DFL	
10	Lisa Bender	DFL	2013	David Wheeler	DFL	
11	Jeremy Schroeder	DFL	2017	Emily Koski	DFL	
11	Jeremy Schroeder	DFL	2017	Jeremy Schroeder	DFL	
11	Jeremy Schroeder	DFL	2017	Kurt Michael Anderson	Independent	
11	Jeremy Schroeder	DFL	2017	Dillon Gherna	DFL	
11	Jeremy Schroeder	DFL	2017	Albert T. Ross	DFL	
12	Andrew Johnson	DFL	2013	Andrew Johnson	DFL	Minneapolis DFL
12	Andrew Johnson	DFL	2013	Nancy Ford	Independent	
12	Andrew Johnson	DFL	2013	David Rosenfeld	Socialist Workers	
13	Linea Palmisano	DFL	2013	Linea Palmisano	DFL	Minneapolis DFL
13	Linea Palmisano	DFL	2013	Mike Norton	DFL	
13	Linea Palmisano	DFL	2013	Kati Medford	Green	
13	Linea Palmisano	DFL	2013	Bob Reuer	Independent	
13	Linea Palmisano	DFL	2013	Ken Salway	Republican	

== Electoral system ==
The 13 members of the City Council are elected from single-member districts via instant-runoff voting, commonly known as ranked choice voting. Voters have the option of ranking up to three candidates in order of preference. Municipal elections in Minnesota are officially nonpartisan, although candidates are able to identify with a political party on the ballot. Write-in candidates must file a request with the Minneapolis Elections & Voter Services Division for votes for them to be counted.

== Results ==
Vote share by first-party preference
1. DFL (86.0%)
2. GOP (2.71%)
3. Green (2.28%)
4. DSA (2.06%)
5. Socialist Workers (0.58%)
6. Other parties (1.30%)
7. Independent (5.02%)
8. Write-in (0.36%)

Party	Candidates	1st Choice Votes			Seats		
Party	Candidates	No.	%	∆pp	No.	∆No.	%
Minnesota Democratic–Farmer–Labor Party	41	115,277	85.95	+3.26	12	0	92.31
Democratic Socialists of America	1	3,061	2.26	+2.26	1	+1	7.69
Republican Party of Minnesota	4	3,631	2.71	+1.37	0	0	0.00
Green Party of Minnesota	2	3,061	2.28	-5.50	0	-1	0.00
Socialist Workers Party	1	773	0.58	+0.58	0	0	0.00
Veterans Party	1	635	0.47	+0.47	0	0	0.00
We the People	1	635	0.47	+0.47	0	0	0.00
Social Justice	1	80	0.06	+0.06	0	0	0.00
Witness	1	38	0.03	+0.03	0	0	0.00
Independent	5	6,739	5.03	+1.13	0	0	0.00
Write-in	N/A	488	0.36	−0.10	0	0	0.00
Total		134,116	100.00	±0.00	13	±0	100.00
Valid votes		134,116	-	-			
Overvotes		-	-	-			
Undervotes		-	-	-			
Turnout (registered voters)		145,337	54.0	+11.6			

=== Ward 1 ===

Party	Candidate	% 1st Choice	Round 1	Round 2	% Final	Status
Democratic (DFL)	Elliott Payne	48.18%	5,511	5,745	52.53%	Elected
Democratic (DFL)	Kevin Reich (incumbent)	42.87%	4,903	5,191	47.47%	Lost
Veteran's Party	Calvin Carpenter	5.58%	638	Eliminated		
Democratic (DFL)	Thomas Wortman	3.17%	363	Eliminated		
Write-in	N/A	0.20%	23	Eliminated		
Exhausted ballots				502	4.39%	
Valid votes			11,438			
Threshold			5,720			
Undervotes			704			
Turnout		57.4%	12,142			
Source: Minneapolis Elections & Voter Services

=== Ward 2 ===
The election in Ward 2 exhibited one of the only two known Condorcet cycles in United States electoral history, with a narrow circular tie between Arab, Gordon, and Wonsley. Arab was preferred over Gordon by a 51.3% majority, Gordon was preferred over Wonsley by 50.5%, and Wonsley was preferred over Arab by 50.1%. Additionally, the election exhibited a downward monotonicity paradox, as well as a paradox akin to Simpson’s paradox. However, according to Minneapolis' ranked choice voting tabulation process, Wonsley narrowly won with 42.6% of final round votes (or 50.09% of unexhausted ballots).

First preference by precinct: Wonsley: 30-40%; 40–50%; 60-70%; Arab: 30-40%; 40-50%; Gordon: 20-30%; 30-40%

Party	Candidate	% 1st Choice	Round 1	Round 2	Round 3	% Final	Status
Democratic Socialists (DSA)	Robin Wonsley	29.04%	2,763	2,879	4,046	50.09%	Elected
Democratic (DFL)	Yusra Arab	28.49%	2,719	3,236	4,032	49.01%	Lost
Green Party	Cam Gordon (incumbent)	26.36%	2,508	2,800	Eliminated		
Democratic (DFL)	Tom Anderson	10.28%	982	Eliminated			
Republican	Guy Gaskin	5.74%	546	Eliminated			
Write-in	N/A	0.09%	9	Eliminated			
Exhausted ballots				612	1,434	16.18%	
Valid votes			9,527				
Threshold			4,764				
Undervotes			272				
Turnout		55.8%	9,799				
Source: Minneapolis Elections & Voter Services

=== Ward 3 ===

Party	Candidate	% 1st Choice	Round 1	Round 2	% Final	Status
Democratic (DFL)	Michael Rainville	45.14%	6,027	6,907	54.97%	Elected
Democratic (DFL)	Steve Fletcher (incumbent)	39.16%	5,229	5,658	45.03%	Lost
Democratic (DFL)	Merv Moorhead	8.72%	1,165	Eliminated		
Independent	Hope Hennessey	6.65%	888	Eliminated		
Write-in	N/A	0.33%	44	Eliminated		
Exhausted ballots				788	5.90%	
Valid votes			13,353			
Threshold			6,677			
Undervotes			1,085			
Turnout		48.9%	14,438			
Source: Minneapolis Elections & Voter Services

=== Ward 4 ===

Party	Candidate	% 1st Choice	Round 1
Minnesota Democratic–Farmer–Labor Party	LaTrisha Vetaw	60.63%	4,391
Minnesota Democratic–Farmer–Labor Party	Phillipe Cunningham (incumbent)	30.32%	2,196
We the People	Leslie Davis	8.77%	635
Write-in	N/A	0.28%	20
Total votes			7,500
Threshold			3,751
Turnout		41.1%	7,500
Source: Minneapolis Elections & Voter Services

=== Ward 5 ===

Party	Candidate	% 1st Choice	Round 1	Round 2	Round 3	% Final
Minnesota Democratic–Farmer–Labor Party	Jeremiah Ellison (incumbent)	31.94%	1,752	1,855	2,117	51.12%
Minnesota Democratic–Farmer–Labor Party	Kristel Porter	24.70%	1,355	1,499	2,024	48.88%
Minnesota Democratic–Farmer–Labor Party	Victor Martinez	24.65%	1,352	1,495		
Minnesota Democratic–Farmer–Labor Party	Suleiman Isse	9.85%	540			
Minnesota Democratic–Farmer–Labor Party	Cathy Spann	4.47%	245			
Independent	Elijah Norris-Holliday	3.56%	195			
Witness	James Seymour	0.71%	39			
Write-in	N/A	0.13%	7			
Exhausted ballots				636	1,344	32.46%
Valid votes			5,485			
Threshold			2,743			
Undervotes			131			
Turnout		33.9%	5,616			
Source: Minneapolis Elections & Voter Services

=== Ward 6 ===

Party	Candidate	% 1st Choice	Round 1
Minnesota Democratic–Farmer–Labor Party	Jamal Osman (incumbent)	59.41%	3,722
Minnesota Democratic–Farmer–Labor Party	Abdirizak Bihi	39.39%	2,468
Write-in	N/A	1.20%	75
Total votes			6,871
Threshold			3,436
Turnout		43.5%	6,871
Source: Minneapolis Elections & Voter Services

=== Ward 7 ===

Party	Candidate	% 1st Choice	Round 1
Minnesota Democratic–Farmer–Labor Party	Lisa Goodman (incumbent)	61.91%	7,206
Minnesota Democratic–Farmer–Labor Party	Nick Kor	26.34%	3,066
Minnesota Democratic–Farmer–Labor Party	Teqen Zéa-Aida	7.16%	833
Minnesota Democratic–Farmer–Labor Party	Joanna Diaz	4.10%	477
Write-in	N/A	0.49%	57
Total votes			12,329
Threshold			6,165
Turnout		54.0%	12,329
Source: Minneapolis Elections & Voter Services

=== Ward 8 ===

Party	Candidate	% 1st Choice	Round 1
Minnesota Democratic–Farmer–Labor Party	Andrea Jenkins (incumbent)	84.92%	9,013
Republican Party of Minnesota	Robert Sullentrop	13.83%	1,468
Write-in	N/A	1.25%	133
Total votes			11,326
Threshold			5,664
Turnout		59.5%	11,326
Source: Minneapolis Elections & Voter Services

=== Ward 9 ===

Party	Candidate	% 1st Choice	Round 1
Minnesota Democratic–Farmer–Labor Party	Jason Chavez	56.89%	3,792
Minnesota Democratic–Farmer–Labor Party	Mickey Moore	13.59%	906
Minnesota Democratic–Farmer–Labor Party	Yussuf Haji	12.63%	842
Republican Party of Minnesota	Ross Tennsesson	4.70%	313
Minnesota Democratic–Farmer–Labor Party	Alfred "AJ" Flowers, Jr.	3.98%	265
Minnesota Democratic–Farmer–Labor Party	Brenda Short	3.71%	247
Minnesota Democratic–Farmer–Labor Party	Carmen Means	3.23%	215
Social Justice	Jon Randall Denison	1.20%	280
Write-in	N/A	0.09%	6
Total votes			6,983
Threshold			3,492
Turnout		49.5%	6,983
Source: Minneapolis Elections & Voter Services

=== Ward 10 ===
Party	Candidate	% 1st Choice	Round 1	Round 2	Round 3	% Final
Minnesota Democratic–Farmer–Labor Party	Aisha Chughtai	36.91%	3,934	4,163	5,360	59.95%
Minnesota Democratic–Farmer–Labor Party	Alicia Gibson	18.75%	1,999	3,022	3,581	40.05%
Minnesota Democratic–Farmer–Labor Party	Katie Jones	19.57%	2,086	2,476		
Minnesota Democratic–Farmer–Labor Party	Chris Parsons	15.10%	1,610			
Minnesota Democratic–Farmer–Labor Party	David Wheeler	5.86%	625			
Minnesota Democratic–Farmer–Labor Party	Ubah Nur	3.51%	374			
—N/a	Write-in	0.29%	31			
Exhausted ballots				998	1,718	19.21%
Valid votes			10,659			
Threshold			5,330			
Undervotes			686			
Turnout		48.7%	11,345			
Source: Minneapolis Elections & Voter Services

Alluvial diagram of vote-preference distribution for Ward 10

=== Ward 11 ===

Party	Candidate	% 1st Choice	Round 1
Minnesota Democratic–Farmer–Labor Party	Emily Koski	58.33%	7,789
Minnesota Democratic–Farmer–Labor Party	Jeremy Schroeder (incumbent)	30.32%	4,049
Independent	Kurt Michael Anderson	5.20%	695
Minnesota Democratic–Farmer–Labor Party	Dillon Gherna	3.41%	455
Minnesota Democratic–Farmer–Labor Party	Albert T. Ross	2.58%	345
Write-in	N/A	0.16%	21
Total votes			13,877
Threshold			6,939
Turnout		65.2%	13,877
Source: Minneapolis Elections & Voter Services

=== Ward 12 ===

Party	Candidate	% 1st Choice	Round 1
Minnesota Democratic–Farmer–Labor Party	Andrew Johnson (incumbent)	64.83%	9,940
Independent	Nancy Ford	29.80%	4,569
Socialist Workers Party	David Rosenfeld	5.04%	773
Write-in	N/A	0.33%	51
Total votes			16,083
Threshold			8,042
Turnout		65.9%	16,083
Source: Minneapolis Elections & Voter Services

=== Ward 13 ===

Party	Candidate	% 1st Choice	Round 1
Minnesota Democratic–Farmer–Labor Party	Linea Palmisano (incumbent)	66.19%	10,883
Minnesota Democratic–Farmer–Labor Party	Mike Norton	19.96%	3,282
Republican Party of Minnesota	Ken Salway	7.94%	1,305
Green Party of Minnesota	Kati Medford	3.39%	557
Independent	Bob Reuer	2.44%	401
Write-in	N/A	0.09%	14
Total votes			17,028
Threshold			8,515
Turnout		67.8%	17,028
Source: Minneapolis Elections & Voter Services

== See also ==
- 2021 Minneapolis municipal election
  - 2021 Minneapolis Question 2
