= 2017 Minneapolis City Council election =

Minneapolis City Council election, 2017
- November 7, 2017

All 13 seats on the Minneapolis City Council 7 seats needed for a majority
- Turnout: 42.5%(▲9.1pp)
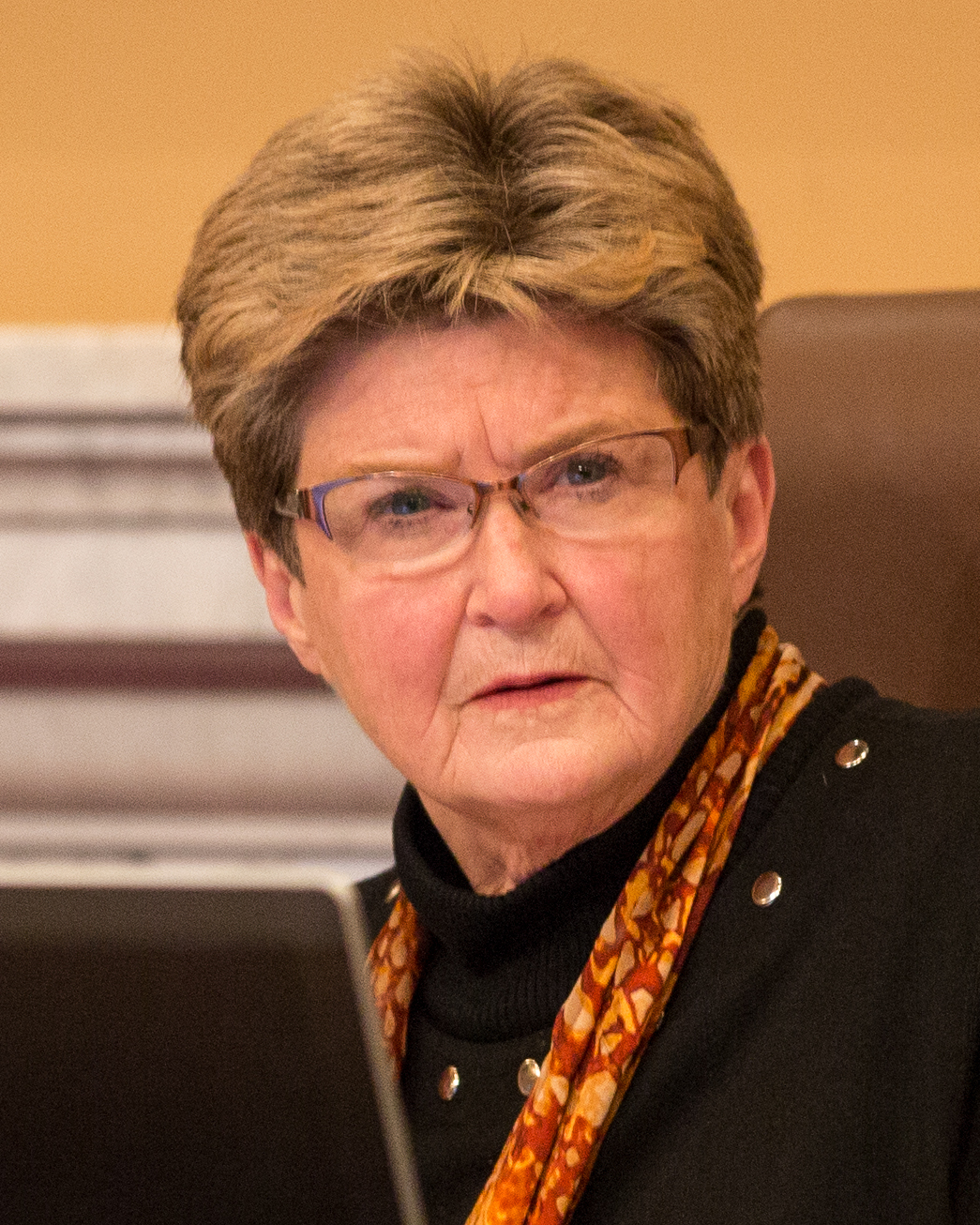

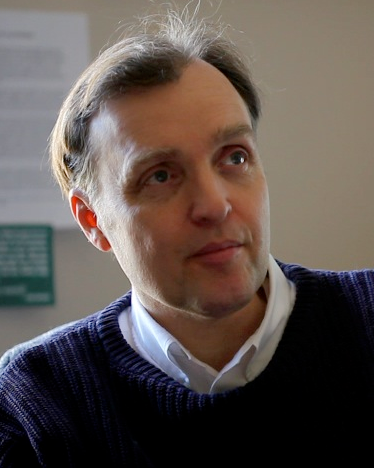
	Majority party	Minority party
Leader	Barb Johnson (defeated)	Cam Gordon
Party	Democratic (DFL)	Green
Leader's seat	Ward 4	Ward 2
Last election	12 seats, 79.31%	1 seat, 7.36%
Seats won	12	1
Seat change	Steady	Steady
Popular vote	84,203	7,926
Percentage	82.69%	7.78%
Swing	▲3.38 pp	▲0.42 pp
- Winning party's vote share by ward.
President before election
Barb Johnson
Democratic (DFL)
Elected President
Lisa Bender
Democratic (DFL)

The 2017 Minneapolis City Council election was held on November 7, 2017, to elect the members of the Minneapolis City Council. The political composition remained unchanged, with the Minnesota Democratic–Farmer–Labor Party (DFL) retaining 12 seats and the Green Party of Minnesota one seat. Three DFL incumbents were defeated by intraparty opponents. The new City Council convened on January 8, 2018.

== Retiring members ==
=== DFL ===
- Jacob Frey, Ward 3 (running for mayor)
- Elizabeth Glidden, Ward 8

== Electoral system ==
The 13 members of the City Council were elected from single-member districts via instant-runoff voting, commonly known as ranked choice voting, for four-year terms. Voters had the option of ranking up to three candidates in order of preference. Municipal elections in Minnesota are officially nonpartisan, although candidates were able to identify with a political party on the ballot. Write-in candidates must have filed a request with the Minneapolis Elections & Voter Services Division for votes for them to be counted.

== Candidates ==
Ward	Incumbent			Candidates		
Ward	Name	Party	First elected	Name	Party	Party endorsement
1	Kevin Reich	DFL	2009	John Hayden	Independent	
1	Kevin Reich	DFL	2009	Jillia Pessenda	DFL	
1	Kevin Reich	DFL	2009	Kevin Reich	DFL	
2	Cam Gordon	Green	2005	Cam Gordon	Green	Fifth District Green Party
3	Jacob Frey (Note: Retired; did not seek re-election.)	DFL	2013	Tim Bildsoe	DFL	
3	Jacob Frey	DFL	2013	Steve Fletcher	DFL	Minneapolis DFL
3	Jacob Frey	DFL	2013	Ginger Jentzen	Socialist Alternative	Socialist Alternative
3	Jacob Frey	DFL	2013	Samantha Pree-Stinson	Green	Fifth District Green Party
4	Barb Johnson	DFL	1997	Phillipe Cunningham	DFL	
4	Barb Johnson	DFL	1997	Stephanie Gasca	DFL	
4	Barb Johnson	DFL	1997	Dana Hansen	Libertarian	Libertarian Party of Minnesota
4	Barb Johnson	DFL	1997	Barb Johnson	DFL	
5	Blong Yang	DFL	2013	Jeremiah Ellison	DFL	Minneapolis DFL
5	Blong Yang	DFL	2013	Cathy Spann	DFL	
5	Blong Yang	DFL	2013	Raeisha Williams	DFL	
5	Blong Yang	DFL	2013	Blong Yang	DFL	
6	Abdi Warsame	DFL	2013	Mohamud Noor	DFL	
6	Abdi Warsame	DFL	2013	Abdi Warsame	DFL	Minneapolis DFL
6	Abdi Warsame	DFL	2013	Fadumo Yusuf	Republican	Minneapolis City Republican Committee
7	Lisa Goodman	DFL	1997	Janne Flisrand	DFL	
7	Lisa Goodman	DFL	1997	Lisa Goodman	DFL	
7	Lisa Goodman	DFL	1997	Joe Kovacs	Republican	Minneapolis City Republican Committee
7	Lisa Goodman	DFL	1997	Teqen Zéa-Aida	DFL	
8	Elizabeth Glidden	DFL	2005	David Holsinger	Libertarian	Libertarian Party of Minnesota
8	Elizabeth Glidden	DFL	2005	Andrea Jenkins	DFL	Minneapolis DFL
8	Elizabeth Glidden	DFL	2005	April Kane	DFL	
8	Elizabeth Glidden	DFL	2005	Terry White	Green	Fifth District Green Party
9	Alondra Cano	DFL	2013	Alondra Cano	DFL	Minneapolis DFL
9	Alondra Cano	DFL	2013	Mohamed Farah	DFL	
9	Alondra Cano	DFL	2013	Ronald Peterson	Republican	
9	Alondra Cano	DFL	2013	Gary Schiff	DFL	
10	Lisa Bender	DFL	2013	Lisa Bender	DFL	Minneapolis DFL
10	Lisa Bender	DFL	2013	Bruce Lundeen	Republican	Minneapolis City Republican Committee
10	Lisa Bender	DFL	2013	Saralyn Romanishan	DFL	
10	Lisa Bender	DFL	2013	David Schorn	DFL	
11	John Quincy	DFL	2009	Erica Mauter	DFL	
11	John Quincy	DFL	2009	John Quincy	DFL	
11	John Quincy	DFL	2009	Jeremy Schroeder	DFL	
12	Andrew Johnson	DFL	2013	Harrison Bullard	Independent (Note: Political principle listed on affidavit of candidacy: "Independent Health Labor".)	
12	Andrew Johnson	DFL	2013	Will Jaeger	Independent	
12	Andrew Johnson	DFL	2013	Andrew Johnson	DFL	Minneapolis DFL
13	Linea Palmisano	DFL	2013	Linea Palmisano	DFL	Minneapolis DFL
13	Linea Palmisano	DFL	2013	Bob Reuer	Independent	

== Results ==
Results by 1st Choice Votes
1. DFL (82.7%)
2. Green (7.78%)
3. Socialist (3.24%)
4. GOP (1.34%)
5. Libertarian (0.60%)
6. Independent (3.89%)
7. Write-in (0.46%)

There were clear winners in several wards on election night. Green Council Member Cam Gordon (Ward 2), who did not have an opponent, won re-election. Other council members who won on election night include DFLers Lisa Goodman (Ward 7), Lisa Bender (Ward 10), Andrew Johnson (Ward 12), and Linea Palmisano (Ward 13). Ward 8 DFL candidate Andrea Jenkins also won, replacing retiring DFL Council Member Elizabeth Glidden. Wards which did not have a clear winner underwent several rounds of vote transfers on November 8.

Three incumbents lost re-election. DFL Council President Barb Johnson (Ward 4) lost to DFL candidate Phillipe Cunningham, DFL Council Member Blong Yang (Ward 5) to DFL candidate Jeremiah Ellison, and DFL Council Member John Quincy (Ward 11) to DFL candidate Jeremy Schroeder. DFL Council Members Kevin Reich (Ward 1), Abdi Warsame (Ward 6), and Alondra Cano (Ward 9) retained their seats.

In Ward 3, DFL candidate Steve Fletcher won over Socialist Alternative candidate Ginger Jentzen, who won the most first-choice votes but did not gain sufficient transfer votes. This was the first occurrence of the initial leader not ending up the winner of an election in Minneapolis since it switched to ranked-choice voting in 2009. A similar situation subsequently occurred in Ward 4 in which Johnson lost to Cunningham.

Jenkins and Cunningham are the first transgender persons to be elected to the City Council.

Party	Candidates	1st Choice Votes			Seats		
Party	Candidates	No.	%	∆pp	No.	∆No.	%
Minnesota Democratic–Farmer–Labor Party	29	84,203	82.69	+3.38	12	0	92.31
Green Party of Minnesota	3	7,926	7.78	+0.42	1	0	7.69
Socialist Alternative	1	3,297	3.24	+1.16	0	0	0.00
Republican Party of Minnesota	4	1,365	1.34	+0.68	0	0	0.00
Libertarian Party of Minnesota	2	607	0.60	+0.34	0	0	0.00
Independent	4	3,958	3.89	−4.14	0	0	0.00
Write-in	N/A	472	0.46	−0.38	0	0	0.00
Total		101,828	100.00	±0.00	13	±0	100.00
Valid votes		101,828	96.13	+1.97			
Overvotes		7	0.01	−0.03			
Undervotes		4,093	3.86	−1.94			
Turnout (out of 249,512 registered voters)		105,928	42.45	+9.07			

=== Ward 1 ===
Most voted first-choice candidate by precinct in Ward 1.

Party	Candidate	% 1st Choice	Round 1	Round 2	% Final
Minnesota Democratic–Farmer–Labor Party	Kevin Reich (incumbent)	45.97	4,015	4,296	49.19
Minnesota Democratic–Farmer–Labor Party	Jillia Pessenda	44.03	3,846	4,112	47.08
Independent	John Hayden	9.77	853		
Write-in	N/A	0.23	20		
Exhausted ballots				326	3.73
Valid votes			8,734		
Threshold			4,368		
Undervotes			130		
Turnout (out of 19,722 registered voters)		44.94	8,864		
Source: Minneapolis Elections & Voter Services

=== Ward 2 ===
Most voted first-choice candidate by precinct in Ward 2.

Party	Candidate	% 1st Choice	Round 1
Green Party of Minnesota	Cam Gordon (incumbent)	97.27	5,912
Write-in	N/A	2.73	166
Valid votes			6,078
Maximum possible threshold			3,518
Overvotes			1
Undervotes			955
Turnout (out of 17,702 registered voters)		39.74	7,034
Source: Minneapolis Elections & Voter Services

=== Ward 3 ===
Most voted first-choice candidate by precinct in Ward 3.

Party	Candidate	% 1st Choice	Round 1	Round 2	Round 3	% Final
Minnesota Democratic–Farmer–Labor Party	Steve Fletcher	28.24	2,709	3,103	4,861	50.68
Socialist Alternative	Ginger Jentzen	34.37	3,297	3,598	3,844	40.08
Minnesota Democratic–Farmer–Labor Party	Tim Bildsoe	26.61	2,552	2,734		
Green Party of Minnesota	Samantha Pree-Stinson	10.50	1,007			
Write-in	N/A	0.28	27			
Exhausted ballots				157	887	9.25
Valid votes			9,592			
Threshold			4,797			
Undervotes			285			
Turnout (out of 24,522 registered voters)		40.28	9,877			
Source: Minneapolis Elections & Voter Services

=== Ward 4 ===
Most voted first-choice candidate by precinct in Ward 4.

Party	Candidate	% 1st Choice	Round 1	Round 2	% Final
Minnesota Democratic–Farmer–Labor Party	Phillipe Cunningham	40.66	2,140	2,605	49.50
Minnesota Democratic–Farmer–Labor Party	Barb Johnson (incumbent)	42.90	2,258	2,430	46.17
Minnesota Democratic–Farmer–Labor Party	Stephanie Gasca	12.05	634		
Libertarian Party of Minnesota	Dana Hansen	4.18	220		
Write-in	N/A	0.21	11		
Exhausted ballots				228	4.33
Valid votes			5,263		
Threshold			2,632		
Undervotes			86		
Turnout (out of 17,156 registered voters)		31.18	5,349		
Source: Minneapolis Elections & Voter Services

=== Ward 5 ===
Most voted first-choice candidate by precinct in Ward 5.

Party	Candidate	% 1st Choice	Round 1	Round 2	% Final
Minnesota Democratic–Farmer–Labor Party	Jeremiah Ellison (incumbent)	47.13	1,987	2,313	54.86
Minnesota Democratic–Farmer–Labor Party	Blong Yang	38.35	1,617	1,769	41.96
Minnesota Democratic–Farmer–Labor Party	Raeisha Williams	10.56	445		
Minnesota Democratic–Farmer–Labor Party	Cathy Spann	3.77	159		
Write-in	N/A	0.19	8		
Exhausted ballots				134	3.18
Valid votes			4,216		
Threshold			2,109		
Undervotes			62		
Turnout (out of 15,302 registered voters)		27.96	4,278		
Source: Minneapolis Elections & Voter Services

=== Ward 6 ===
Most voted first-choice candidate by precinct in Ward 6.

Party	Candidate	% 1st Choice	Round 1
Minnesota Democratic–Farmer–Labor Party	Abdi Warsame (incumbent)	50.17	3,629
Minnesota Democratic–Farmer–Labor Party	Mohamud Noor	46.86	3,390
Republican Party of Minnesota	Fadumo Yusuf	2.53	183
Write-in	Tiffini Forslund	0.08	6
Write-in	N/A	0.36	26
Valid votes			7,234
Threshold			3,618
Undervotes			163
Turnout (out of 15,725 registered voters)		47.04	7,397
Source: Minneapolis Elections & Voter Services

=== Ward 7 ===
Most voted first-choice candidate by precinct in Ward 7.

Party	Candidate	% 1st Choice	Round 1
Minnesota Democratic–Farmer–Labor Party	Lisa Goodman (incumbent)	52.26	4,742
Minnesota Democratic–Farmer–Labor Party	Janne Flisrand	31.21	2,832
Minnesota Democratic–Farmer–Labor Party	Teqen Zéa-Aida	9.79	888
Republican Party of Minnesota	Joe Kovacs	6.60	599
Write-in	N/A	0.14	13
Valid votes			9,074
Maximum possible threshold			4,628
Overvotes			3
Undervotes			178
Turnout (out of 20,789 registered voters)		44.52	9,255
Source: Minneapolis Elections & Voter Services

=== Ward 8 ===
Most voted first-choice candidate by precinct in Ward 8.

Party	Candidate	% 1st Choice	Round 1
Minnesota Democratic–Farmer–Labor Party	Andrea Jenkins	73.09	5,762
Green Party of Minnesota	Terry White	12.77	1,007
Minnesota Democratic–Farmer–Labor Party	April Kane	9.01	710
Libertarian Party of Minnesota	David Holsinger	4.91	387
Write-in	N/A	0.22	17
Valid votes			7,883
Maximum possible threshold			4,138
Overvotes			1
Undervotes			391
Turnout (out of 18,090 registered voters)		45.74	8,275
Source: Minneapolis Elections & Voter Services

=== Ward 9 ===
Most voted first-choice candidate by precinct in Ward 9.

Party	Candidate	% 1st Choice	Round 1	Round 2	% Final
Minnesota Democratic–Farmer–Labor Party	Alondra Cano (incumbent)	47.53	2,623	2,982	54.03
Minnesota Democratic–Farmer–Labor Party	Gary Schiff	29.43	1,624	1,934	35.04
Minnesota Democratic–Farmer–Labor Party	Mohamed Farah	19.64	1,084		
Republican Party of Minnesota	Ronald Peterson	3.03	167		
Write-in	N/A	0.38	21		
Exhausted ballots				603	10.93
Valid votes			5,519		
Threshold			2,760		
Undervotes			131		
Turnout (out of 13,111 registered voters)		43.09	5,650		
Source: Minneapolis Elections & Voter Services

=== Ward 10 ===
Most voted first-choice candidate by precinct in Ward 10.

Party	Candidate	% 1st Choice	Round 1
Minnesota Democratic–Farmer–Labor Party	Lisa Bender (incumbent)	64.34	4,883
Minnesota Democratic–Farmer–Labor Party	Saralyn Romanishan	20.57	1,561
Minnesota Democratic–Farmer–Labor Party	David Schorn	9.34	709
Republican Party of Minnesota	Bruce Lundeen	5.48	416
Write-in	N/A	0.26	20
Valid votes			7,589
Maximum possible threshold			3,956
Undervotes			322
Turnout (out of 20,942 registered voters)		37.78	7,911
Source: Minneapolis Elections & Voter Services

=== Ward 11 ===
Most voted first-choice candidate by precinct in Ward 11.

Party	Candidate	% 1st Choice	Round 1	Round 2	% Final
Minnesota Democratic–Farmer–Labor Party	Jeremy Schroeder	35.26	3,230	4,757	51.93
Minnesota Democratic–Farmer–Labor Party	John Quincy (incumbent)	34.93	3,200	3,981	43.46
Minnesota Democratic–Farmer–Labor Party	Erica Mauter	29.43	2,696		
Write-in	N/A	0.37	34		
Exhausted ballots				422	4.61
Valid votes			9,160		
Threshold			4,581		
Undervotes			432		
Turnout (out of 20,264 registered voters)		47.34	9,592		
Source: Minneapolis Elections & Voter Services

=== Ward 12 ===
Most voted first-choice candidate by precinct in Ward 12.

Party	Candidate	% 1st Choice	Round 1
Minnesota Democratic–Farmer–Labor Party	Andrew Johnson (incumbent)	87.15	8,874
Independent	Will Jaeger	9.40	957
Independent	Harrison Bullard	3.10	316
Write-in	N/A	0.34	35
Valid votes			10,182
Maximum possible threshold			5,353
Undervotes			522
Turnout (out of 22,735 registered voters)		47.08	10,704
Source: Minneapolis Elections & Voter Services

=== Ward 13 ===
Most voted first-choice candidate by precinct in Ward 13.

Party	Candidate	% 1st Choice	Round 1
Minnesota Democratic–Farmer–Labor Party	Linea Palmisano (incumbent)	83.19	9,404
Independent	Bob Reuer	16.21	1,832
Write-in	N/A	0.60	68
Valid votes			11,304
Maximum possible threshold			5,872
Overvotes			2
Undervotes			436
Turnout (out of 23,452 registered voters)		50.07	11,742
Source: Minneapolis Elections & Voter Services

== President of the City Council election ==
After the election, which resulted in the defeat of Council President Barb Johnson, it was reported that DFL Council Members Lisa Bender, Linea Palmisano, and Council Member-elect Andrea Jenkins were seeking to replace her. When the new City Council convened on January 8, 2018, it unanimously elected Bender to be president.

Following Bender's election, it was revealed that Jenkins and Palmisano were respectively seeking to be elected president and vice-president as a ticket. Bender said that while she had the votes to defeat them and install her supporters as chairs of choice committees, she wanted to avoid the Council splitting into factions that had sometimes characterized the previous City Council. As part of a deal to get her unanimous support and to present a united front, Bender agreed that Jenkins would be vice-president, who was also elected unanimously. A new committee structure was agreed to and council members that did not nominally support her would be given choice committee chairs. Bender said that all council members had to compromise. A final deal was not reached until January 7.

== See also ==
- Minneapolis mayoral election, 2017
- Minneapolis municipal election, 2017
