= 2009 Minneapolis City Council election =

2009 Minneapolis City Council elections
- November 3, 2009

All 13 seats on the Minneapolis City Council 7 seats needed for a majority
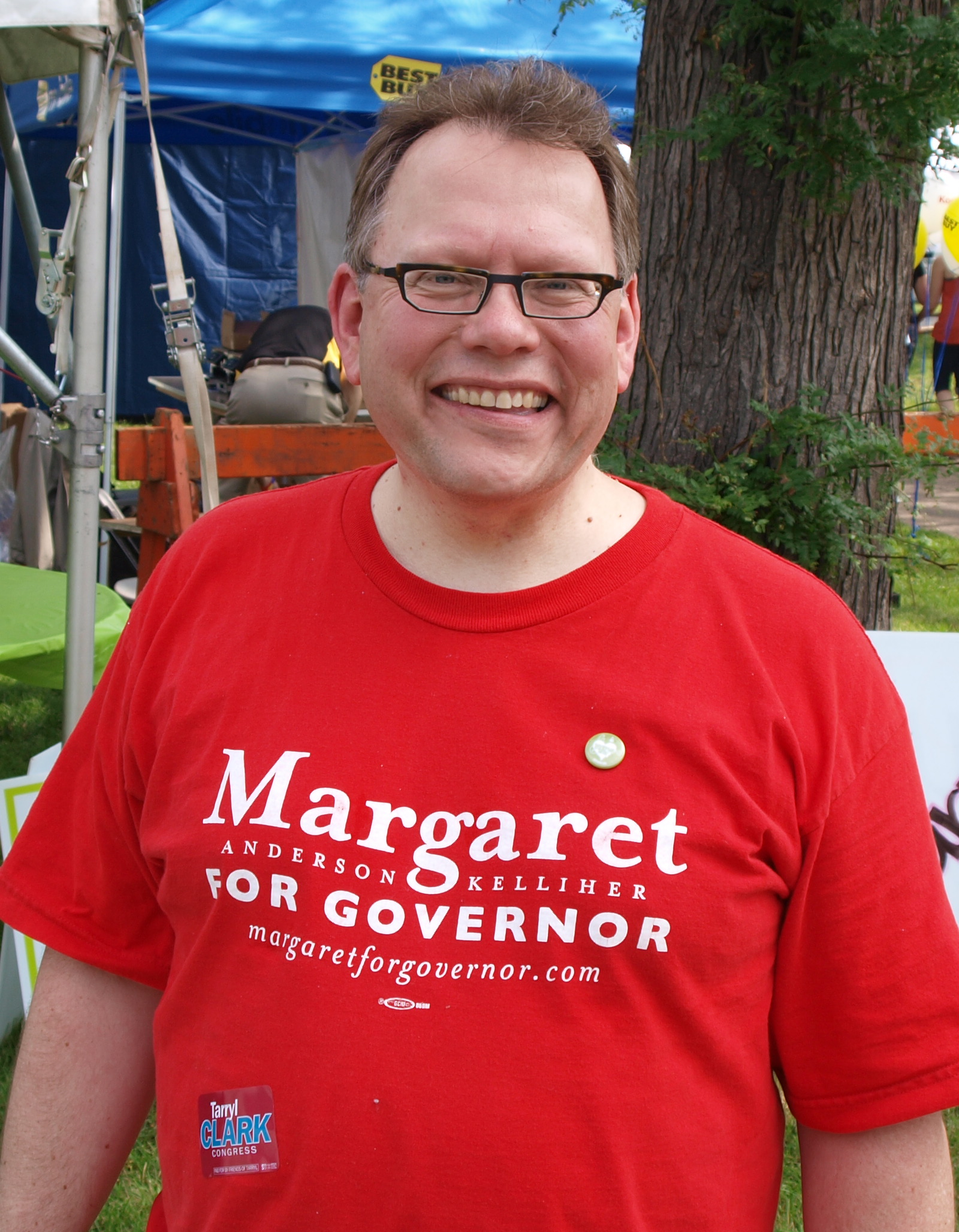

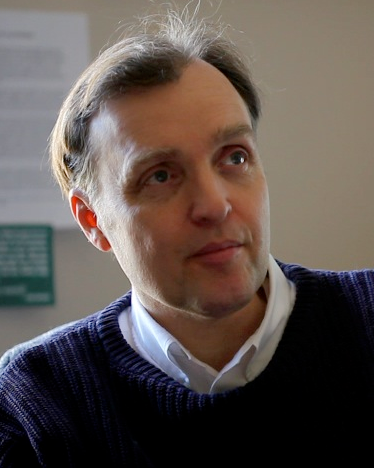
	Majority party	Minority party
Leader	Scott Benson (retired)	Cam Gordon
Party	Democratic (DFL)	Green
Leader's seat	Ward 11	Ward 2
Last election	12 seats	1 seat
Seats won	12	1
Seat change	Steady	Steady
Popular vote	31,167	4,371
Percentage	69.57%	9.76%
- Winning party's vote share by ward.
President before election
Barb Johnson
Democratic (DFL)
Elected President
Barb Johnson
Democratic (DFL)

The 2009 Minneapolis City Council elections were held on November 3, 2009 to elect the 13 members of the Minneapolis City Council for four-year terms. Candidates affiliated with the Minnesota Democratic–Farmer–Labor Party (DFL) won 12 seats and the Green Party of Minnesota one seat.

Members were elected from single-member districts via instant-runoff voting, popularly known as ranked choice voting. Voters had the option of ranking up to three candidates. Municipal elections in Minnesota are nonpartisan, although candidates were able to identify with a political party on the ballot.

== Political party endorsements ==
Ward	Minneapolis DFL	Fifth District Green Party	Fifth Congressional District Independence Party of Minnesota	Libertarian Party of Minnesota	Minneapolis City Republican Committee
Ward 1	Kevin Reich				Thomas Alessi
Ward 2		Cam Gordon	Allen Aigbogun		Allen Aigbogun
Ward 3	Diane Hofstede				Jeffrey Cobia
Ward 4	Barb Johnson	Marcus Harcus	Grant Cermak		Grant Cermak
Ward 5	Don Samuels		Roger Smithrud		
Ward 6	Robert Lilligren	Andy Exley	Mike Tupper		Mike Tupper
Ward 7	Lisa Goodman		Michael Katch	Michael Katch	Michael Katch
Ward 8	Elizabeth Glidden	Jeanine Estime	Greg McDonald		
Ward 9	Gary Schiff	Dave Bicking	Todd Eberhardy		Todd Eberhardy
Ward 10	Meg Tuthill		Dan Alvin		Kim Vlaisavljevich
Ward 11	John Quincy				
Ward 12	Sandy Colvin Roy		Rick Nyhlen		Rick Nyhlen
Ward 13	Betsy Hodges		Kris Broberg		Kris Broberg

== Results ==
=== Summary ===
Summary of the November 3, 2009 Minneapolis City Council elections results
Party	Candidates	1st Choice Votes		Seats		
Party	Candidates	#	%	#	∆#	%
Minnesota Democratic–Farmer–Labor Party	24	31,167	69.57	12	Steady	92.31
Green Party of Minnesota	7	4,371	9.76	1	Steady	7.69
Republican Party of Minnesota	3	1,120	2.50	0	Steady	0.00
Independence Party of Minnesota	2	557	1.24	0	Steady	0.00
Socialist Action	1	130	0.29	0	Steady	0.00
Libertarian Party of Minnesota	1	39	0.09	0	Steady	0.00
Independent	16	7,275	16.24	0	Steady	0.00
Write-in	N/A	141	0.31	0	Steady	0.00
Total		44,800	100.00	13	±0	100.00
Valid votes		44,800	97.46			
Undervotes		1,168	2.54			
Turnout		45,968	19.64			
Registered voters		234,028				

=== Ward 1 ===
1st preference vote by precinct

Minneapolis City Council Ward 1 election, 2009
Political party/principle	Candidate	% 1st Choice	Round 1
DFL	Kevin Reich	50.31	1,997
Independent	Larry Ranallo	23.71	941
DFL	Susan Howitz Hanna	13.48	535
Ron Paul Conservative	Thomas Alessi	8.57	340
Equity Advocacy Responsibility	Mark Fox	3.85	153
N/A	Write-in	0.08	3
Threshold: 1,985; Valid: 3,969; Undervotes: 47; Turnout: 4,016 (22.69%); Registered: 17,697

=== Ward 2 ===
1st preference vote by precinct

Minneapolis City Council Ward 2 election, 2009
Political party/principle	Candidate	% 1st Choice	Round 1
Green Party of Minnesota	Cam Gordon (incumbent)	84.05	2,260
Independent	Allen A. Aigbogun	15.17	408
N/A	Write-in	0.77	21
Threshold: 1,345; Valid: 2,689; Undervotes: 153; Turnout: 2,842 (14.21%); Registered: 20,005

=== Ward 3 ===
1st preference vote by precinct

Minneapolis City Council Ward 3 election, 2009
Political party/principle	Candidate	% 1st Choice	Round 1
DFL	Diane Hofstede	65.93	1,465
DFL	Allen Kathir	15.66	348
Republican Party of Minnesota	Jeffrey Cobia	10.89	242
Civil Disobedience	Melissa Hill	5.09	113
Libertarian Party of Minnesota	Raymond Wilson Rolfe	1.76	39
N/A	Write-in	0.68	15
Threshold: 1,112; Valid: 2,222; Undervotes: 35; Turnout: 2,257 (14.13%); Registered: 15,969

=== Ward 4 ===
1st preference vote by precinct

Minneapolis City Council Ward 4 election, 2009
Political party/principle	Candidate	% 1st Choice	Round 1	Round 2
DFL	Barbara A. "Barb" Johnson	46.86	1,546	1,740
DFL	Troy Parker	27.92	921	1,252
Green Party of Minnesota	Marcus Harcus	13.40	442	
Independent	Grant Cermak	11.70	386	
N/A	Write-in	0.12	4	
Exhausted ballots				307
Threshold: 1,650; Valid: 3,299; Undervotes: 23; Turnout: 3,322 (21.44%); Registered: 15,491

=== Ward 5 ===
1st preference vote by precinct

Minneapolis City Council Ward 5 election, 2009
Political party/principle	Candidate	% 1st Choice	Round 1	Round 2
DFL	Don Samuels	47.00	1,020	1,131
DFL	Natalie Johnson Lee	30.05	652	893
DFL	Kenya McKnight	15.48	336	
Independent	Roger Smithrud	4.29	93	
DFL	Lennie Chism	2.81	61	
N/A	Write-in	0.37	8	
Exhausted ballots				146
Threshold: 1,086; Valid: 2,170; Undervotes: 30; Turnout: 2,200 (17.05%); Registered: 12,900

=== Ward 6 ===
1st preference vote by precinct

Minneapolis City Council Ward 6 election, 2009
Political party/principle	Candidate	% 1st Choice	Round 1
DFL	Robert Lilligren (incumbent)	52.85	1,020
Independent	Michael Tupper	15.13	292
Progressive Democrat	Laura Jean	11.97	231
Green Party of Minnesota	Andy Exley	8.55	165
Green Party of Minnesota	M Cali	8.19	158
Green Party of Minnesota	Bruce A. Lundeen	3.11	60
N/A	Write-in	0.21	4
Threshold: 966; Valid: 1,930; Undervotes: 52; Turnout: 1,982 (13.52%); Registered: 14,655

=== Ward 7 ===
1st preference vote by precinct

Minneapolis City Council Ward 7 election, 2009
Political party/principle	Candidate	% 1st Choice	Round 1
DFL	Lisa Goodman (incumbent)	68.24	2,997
Independent	Michael J Katch	23.72	1,042
Independent	Jeffrey Alan Wagner	7.31	321
N/A	Write-in	0.73	32
Threshold: 2,197; Valid: 4,392; Undervotes: 140; Turnout: 4,532 (19.17%); Registered: 23,639

=== Ward 8 ===
1st preference vote by precinct

Minneapolis City Council Ward 8 election, 2009
Political party/principle	Candidate	% 1st Choice	Round 1
DFL	Elizabeth Glidden	74.00	2,291
Green Party of Minnesota	Jeanine Estime	15.18	470
Republican Party of Minnesota	David Regan	5.62	174
Independent	Gregory McDonald	3.71	115
Open Progressive	Michael J. Cavlan	1.39	43
N/A	Write-in	0.10	3
Threshold: 1,549; Valid: 3,096; Undervotes: 143; Turnout: 3,239 (19.51%); Registered: 16,601

=== Ward 9 ===
1st preference vote by precinct

Minneapolis City Council Ward 9 election, 2009
Political party/principle	Candidate	% 1st Choice	Round 1
DFL	Gary Schiff (incumbent)	60.70	1,818
Green Party of Minnesota	Dave Bicking	27.25	816
Independence Party of Minnesota	Todd J. Eberhardy	9.02	270
DFL	Khalif Jama	2.77	83
N/A	Write-in	0.27	8
Threshold: 1,498; Valid: 2,995; Undervotes: 40; Turnout: 3,035 (21.45%); Registered: 14,149

=== Ward 10 ===
1st preference vote by precinct

Minneapolis City Council Ward 10 election, 2009
Political party/principle	Candidate	% 1st Choice	Round 1
DFL	Meg Tuthill	72.24	2,405
Independent	Kim Vlaisavljevich	10.18	339
DFL	Matthew Dowgwillo	8.77	292
Independence Party of Minnesota	Dan Alvin	8.62	287
N/A	Write-in	0.18	6
Threshold: 1,665; Valid: 3,329; Undervotes: 102; Turnout: 3,431 (17.74%); Registered: 19,343

=== Ward 11 ===
1st preference vote by precinct

Minneapolis City Council Ward 11 election, 2009
Political party/principle	Candidate	% 1st Choice	Round 1
DFL	John Quincy	63.62	2,551
DFL	Gregg A Iverson	18.30	734
Republican Party of Minnesota	David A Alvarado	17.56	704
N/A	Write-in	0.52	21
Threshold: 2,006; Valid: 4,010; Undervotes: 225; Turnout: 4,235 (21.20%); Registered: 19,973

=== Ward 12 ===
1st preference vote by precinct

Minneapolis City Council Ward 12 election, 2009
Political party/principle	Candidate	% 1st Choice	Round 1
DFL	Sandy Colvin Roy	64.33	3,035
Independent	Rick L. Nyhlen	18.65	880
DFL	Charley Underwood	14.05	663
Socialist Action	Brent Perry	2.76	130
N/A	Write-in	0.21	10
Threshold: 2,360; Valid: 4,718; Undervotes: 100; Turnout: 4,818 (23.19%); Registered: 20,779

=== Ward 13 ===
1st preference vote by precinct

Minneapolis City Council Ward 13 election, 2009
Political party/principle	Candidate	% 1st Choice	Round 1
DFL	Betsy Hodges (incumbent)	69.24	4,141
Independent	Kris Broberg	26.38	1,578
DFL	Joseph Henry	4.28	256
N/A	Write-in	0.10	6
Threshold: 2,991; Valid: 5,981; Undervotes: 78; Turnout: 6,059 (26.54%); Registered: 22,827

== See also ==
- Minneapolis municipal elections, 2009
