= Andy Exley =

American politician

Andy Exley is an American politician and member of the Green Party of Minnesota in Minneapolis, Minnesota. He earned his bachelor's degree from Carleton College in 2003. He served as the chairman of the Green Party of Minnesota from June 2008. He was a candidate for the Minneapolis City Council, Ward 6 in the 2009 Minneapolis municipal elections. Minneapolis elections use ranked choice voting; Exley received 165 first place votes for 8.55% of the vote.

There are currently two elected members of the Green Party of Minnesota serving in the Minneapolis city government: Ward 2 city council member Cam Gordon, and at-large Minneapolis Park and Recreation Board commissioner Annie Young.
