= 2013 Minneapolis City Council election =

Minneapolis City Council elections, 2013
- November 5, 2013

All 13 seats on the Minneapolis City Council 7 seats needed for a majority
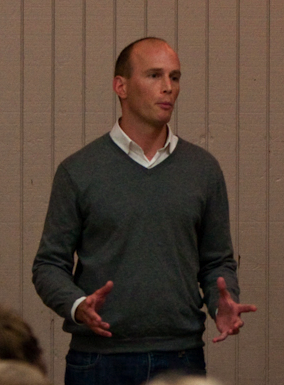

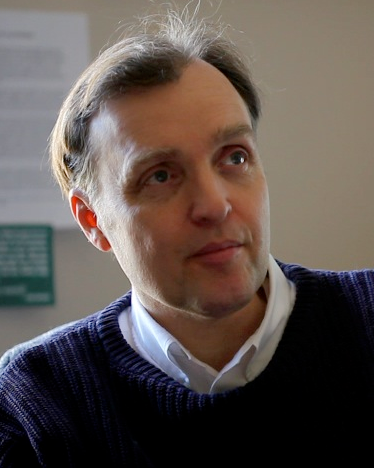
	Majority party	Minority party
Leader	Gary Schiff (retiring)	Cam Gordon
Party	Democratic (DFL)	Green
Leader's seat	Ward 9	Ward 2
Last election	12 seats, 69.57%	1 seat, 9.76%
Seats won	12	1
Seat change	Steady	Steady
Popular vote	59,814	5,553
Percentage	79.31%	7.36%
Swing	▲9.74 pp	▼2.40 pp
- Winning party's vote share by ward.
President before election
Barb Johnson
Democratic (DFL)
Elected President
Barb Johnson
Democratic (DFL)

The 2013 Minneapolis City Council elections were held on November 5, 2013, to elect the 13 members of the Minneapolis City Council for four-year terms. 10 races produced a winner in the first round and the remaining three in the second round. Candidates affiliated with the Minnesota Democratic–Farmer–Labor Party (DFL) won all 12 of the seats where they had fielded a candidate, and the Green Party of Minnesota won the remaining one seat.

Members were elected from single-member districts via instant-runoff voting, popularly known as ranked choice voting. Voters had the option of ranking up to three candidates. Municipal elections in Minnesota are officially nonpartisan, although candidates were able to identify with a political party on the ballot.

== Candidates ==
Names of incumbents are italicized.

Ward	Candidate	Political party/principle	Political party endorsement(s)
1	Vincent Coffeen	Minnesota Pirate Party	Minnesota Pirate Party
1	Mark Fox	Independent	
1	Kevin Reich	DFL	Minneapolis DFL
2	Cam Gordon	Green Party of Minnesota	Fifth District Green Party
2	Diana Newberry	Socialist Workers Party	
3	Jacob Frey	DFL	Minneapolis DFL
3	Kristina Gronquist	Green Party of Minnesota	Fifth District Green Party
3	Diane Hofstede	DFL	
3	Michael Katch	Libertarian	Libertarian Party of Minnesota; Minnesota Pirate Party; Minneapolis City Republican Committee (Note: A "recommendation." Not an official endorsement.)
4	Kris Brogan	DFL	
4	Barb Johnson	DFL	Minneapolis DFL
4	Dan Niesen	Republican Party of Minnesota	
5	Ian Alexander	DFL	
5	Brett Buckner	DFL	
5	Kale Severson	Green Party of Minnesota	Fifth District Green Party
5	Blong Yang	DFL	Fifth Congressional District Independence Party of Minnesota
6	Abukar Abdi	DFL	
6	Sheikh Abdul	DFL	
6	Abdi Addow	DFL	
6	Mahamed Cali	DFL	
6	Robert Lilligren	DFL	
6	Abdi Warsame	DFL	Minneapolis DFL
7	Lisa Goodman	DFL	Minneapolis DFL
8	Elizabeth Glidden	DFL	Minneapolis DFL
9	Abdi Abdulle	DFL	
9	Alondra Cano	DFL	Minneapolis DFL
9	Charles Curtis	Politics with Principle	
9	Pat Fleetham	DFL	
9	Gregory McDonald	DFL	
9	Ty Moore	Socialist Alternative	Fifth District Green Party
10	Lisa Bender	DFL	Minneapolis DFL
10	Scott Hargarten	Minnesota Pirate Party	Minnesota Pirate Party
10	Meg Tuthill	DFL	
11	Bob Schlosser	Non-Party Affiliate	
11	Matt Steele	Independent	Fifth Congressional District Independence Party of Minnesota
11	John Quincy	DFL	Minneapolis DFL
12	Charlie Casserly	Independent	
12	Dick Franson	DFL	
12	Ben Gisselman	DFL	
12	Andrew Johnson	DFL	
12	Chris Lautenschlager	Green Party of Minnesota	Fifth District Green Party
13	Missy Durant	DFL	
13	Linea Palmisano	DFL	Minneapolis DFL
13	Matt Perry	DFL	
13	David Regan	Libertarian Party of Minnesota	
13	Bob Reuer	Independent	Minneapolis City Republican Committee

=== Dropped out ===
Ward	Candidate	Political party/principle	Political party endorsement(s)
10	Nate Griggs	Independence Party of Minnesota	Fifth Congressional District Independence Party of Minnesota

Griggs announced on October 20, 2013, that he had accepted a job offer and would no longer be running.

== Results ==
=== Summary ===
Summary of the November 5, 2013 Minneapolis City Council elections results
Party	Candidates	1st Choice Votes			Seats		
Party	Candidates	#	%	∆pp	#	∆#	%
Minnesota Democratic–Farmer–Labor Party	29	59,814	79.31	▲9.74	12	Steady	92.31
Green Party of Minnesota	4	5,553	7.36	▼2.40	1	Steady	7.69
Socialist Alternative	1	1,569	2.08	▲2.08	0	Steady	
Socialist Workers Party	1	524	0.69	▲0.69	0	Steady	
Republican Party of Minnesota	1	501	0.66	▼1.84	0	Steady	
Minnesota Pirate Party	2	342	0.45	▲0.45	0	Steady	
Independence Party of Minnesota	1	226	0.30	▼0.94	0	Steady	
Libertarian Party of Minnesota	1	199	0.26	▲0.17	0	Steady	
Independent	7	6,057	8.03	▼8.21	0	Steady	
Write-in	N/A	637	0.84	▲0.53	0	Steady	
Total		75,422	100.00	—	13	±0	100.00
Valid votes		75,422	94.16	▼3.30			
Undervotes		4,649	5.80	▲3.26			
Overvotes		30	0.04	N/A			
Turnout		80,101	33.38	▲13.74			
Registered voters		239,985					

=== Ward 1 ===
1st preference vote by precinct

Minneapolis City Council Ward 1 election, 2013
Political party/principle	Candidate	% 1st Choice	Round 1
DFL	Kevin Reich	76.08	4,268
Independent	Mark Fox	19.06	1,069
Minnesota Pirate Party	Vincent Coffeen	4.39	246
N/A	Write-ins	0.48	27
Maximum possible threshold			2,972
Valid votes			5,610
Undervotes			331
Overvotes			1
Turnout		30.93%	5,942
Registered voters			19,209

=== Ward 2 ===
1st preference vote by precinct

Minneapolis City Council Ward 2 election, 2013
Political party/principle	Candidate	% 1st Choice	Round 1
Green Party of Minnesota	Cam Gordon (incumbent)	87.14	4,060
Socialist Workers Party	Diana Newberry	11.25	524
N/A	Write-ins	1.61	75
Maximum possible threshold			2,579
Valid votes			4,659
Undervotes			497
Turnout		27.56%	5,156
Registered voters			18,705

=== Ward 3 ===
1st preference vote by precinct

Minneapolis City Council Ward 3 election, 2013
Political party/principle	Candidate	% 1st Choice	Round 1
DFL	Jacob Frey	61.31	3,722
DFL	Diane Hofstede	26.59	1,614
Libertarian	Michael Katch	5.98	363
Green Party of Minnesota	Kristina Gronquist	5.88	357
N/A	Write-ins	0.25	15
Maximum possible threshold			3,104
Valid votes			6,071
Undervotes			132
Overvotes			3
Turnout		30.99%	6,206
Registered voters			20,027

=== Ward 4 ===
1st preference vote by precinct

Minneapolis City Council Ward 4 election, 2013
Political party/principle	Candidate	% 1st Choice	Round 1
DFL	Barb Johnson	56.60	2,153
DFL	Kris Brogan	29.92	1,138
Republican Party of Minnesota	Dan Niesen	13.17	501
N/A	Write-ins	0.32	12
Maximum possible threshold			1,971
Valid votes			3,804
Undervotes			134
Overvotes			2
Turnout		23.06%	3,940
Registered voters			17,086

=== Ward 5 ===
1st preference vote by precinct

Minneapolis City Council Ward 5 election, 2013
Political party/principle	Candidate	% 1st Choice	Round 1	Round 2	% Final
DFL	Blong Yang	42.15	1,475	1,842	52.64
DFL	Ian Alexander	29.95	1,048	1,394	39.84
DFL	Brett Buckner	21.32	746		
Green Party of Minnesota	Kale Severson	6.29	220		
N/A	Write-ins	0.29	10		
Exhausted ballots				263	7.52
Threshold			1,750		
Valid votes			3,499		
Undervotes			123		
Turnout		23.54%	3,622		
Registered voters			15,388		

=== Ward 6 ===
1st preference vote by precinct

Minneapolis City Council Ward 6 election, 2013
Political party/principle	Candidate	% 1st Choice	Round 1
DFL	Abdi Warsame	63.92	3,090
DFL	Robert Lilligren (incumbent)	32.21	1,557
DFL	Abdi Addow	1.80	87
DFL	Sheikh Abdul	0.81	39
DFL	Mahamed Cali	0.52	25
DFL	Abukar Abdi	0.41	20
N/A	Write-ins	0.33	16
Maximum possible threshold			2,526
Valid votes			4,834
Undervotes			205
Overvotes			12
Turnout		33.62%	5,051
Registered voters			15,023

=== Ward 7 ===
1st preference vote by precinct

Minneapolis City Council Ward 7 election, 2013
Political party/principle	Candidate	% 1st Choice	Round 1
DFL	Lisa Goodman	94.89	5,309
N/A	Write-ins	5.11	286
Maximum possible threshold			3,298
Valid votes			5,595
Undervotes			994
Overvotes			5
Turnout		33.56%	6,594
Registered voters			19,651

=== Ward 8 ===
1st preference vote by precinct

Minneapolis City Council Ward 8 election, 2013
Political party/principle	Candidate	% 1st Choice	Round 1
DFL	Elizabeth Glidden	97.74	5,105
N/A	Write-ins	2.26	118
Maximum possible threshold			3,032
Valid votes			5,223
Undervotes			839
Overvotes			1
Turnout		35.00%	6,063
Registered voters			17,322

=== Ward 9 ===
1st preference vote by precinct

Minneapolis City Council Ward 9 election, 2013
Political party/principle	Candidate	% 1st Choice	Round 1	Round 2	% Final
DFL	Alondra Cano	40.63	1,698	1,987	47.55
Socialist Alternative	Ty Moore	37.54	1,569	1,758	42.07
Politics with Principle	Charles Curtis	8.09	338		
DFL	Abdi Abdulle	6.84	1286		
DFL	Pat Fleetham	3.66	153		
DFL	Gregory McDonald	2.80	117		
N/A	Write-ins	0.43	18		
Exhausted ballots				434	10.39
Threshold			2,090		
Valid votes			4,179		
Undervotes			131		
Turnout		34.05%	4,310		
Registered voters			12,658		

=== Ward 10 ===
1st preference vote by precinct

Minneapolis City Council Ward 10 election, 2013
Political party/principle	Candidate	% 1st Choice	Round 1
DFL	Lisa Bender	64.21	3,704
DFL	Meg Tuthill	30.02	1,732
Independence Party of Minnesota	Nate Griggs	3.92	226
Minnesota Pirate Party	Scott Hargarten	1.66	96
N/A	Write-ins	0.19	11
Maximum possible threshold			2,967
Valid votes			5,769
Undervotes			160
Overvotes			4
Turnout		30.49%	5,933
Registered voters			19,456

=== Ward 11 ===
1st preference vote by precinct

Minneapolis City Council Ward 11 election, 2013
Political party/principle	Candidate	% 1st Choice	Round 1
DFL	John Quincy (incumbent)	67.48	4,952
Independent	Matt Steele	27.97	2,053
Non-Party Affiliate	Bob Schlosser	4.48	329
N/A	Write-ins	0.07	5
Maximum possible threshold			3,901
Valid votes			7,339
Undervotes			460
Overvotes			1
Turnout		38.81%	7,800
Registered voters			20,100

=== Ward 12 ===
1st preference vote by precinct

Minneapolis City Council Ward 12 election, 2013
Political party/principle	Candidate	% 1st Choice	Round 1
DFL	Andrew Johnson	54.33	4,553
DFL	Ben Gisselman	17.04	1,428
Independent	Charlie Casserly	13.79	1,156
Green Party of Minnesota	Chris Lautenschlager	10.93	916
DFL	Dick Franson	3.51	294
N/A	Write-ins	0.41	34
Maximum possible threshold			4,372
Valid votes			8,381
Undervotes			360
Overvotes			1
Turnout		39.54%	8,742
Registered voters			22,108

=== Ward 13 ===
1st preference vote by precinct

Minneapolis City Council Ward 13 election, 2013
Political party/principle	Candidate	% 1st Choice	Round 1	Round 2	% Final
DFL	Linea Palmisano	42.57	4,452	5,059	48.37
DFL	Matt Perry	38.85	4,063	4,705	44.99
DFL	Missy Durant	9.43	986		
Independent	Bob Reuer	7.16	749		
Libertarian Party of Minnesota	David Regan	1.90	199		
N/A	Write-ins	0.10	10		
Exhausted ballots				695	6.64
Threshold			5,230		
Valid votes			10,459		
Undervotes			283		
Turnout		46.20%	10,742		
Registered voters			23,252		

== See also ==
- Minneapolis municipal elections, 2013
- Minneapolis mayoral election, 2013
