= John Quincy (Minnesota politician) =

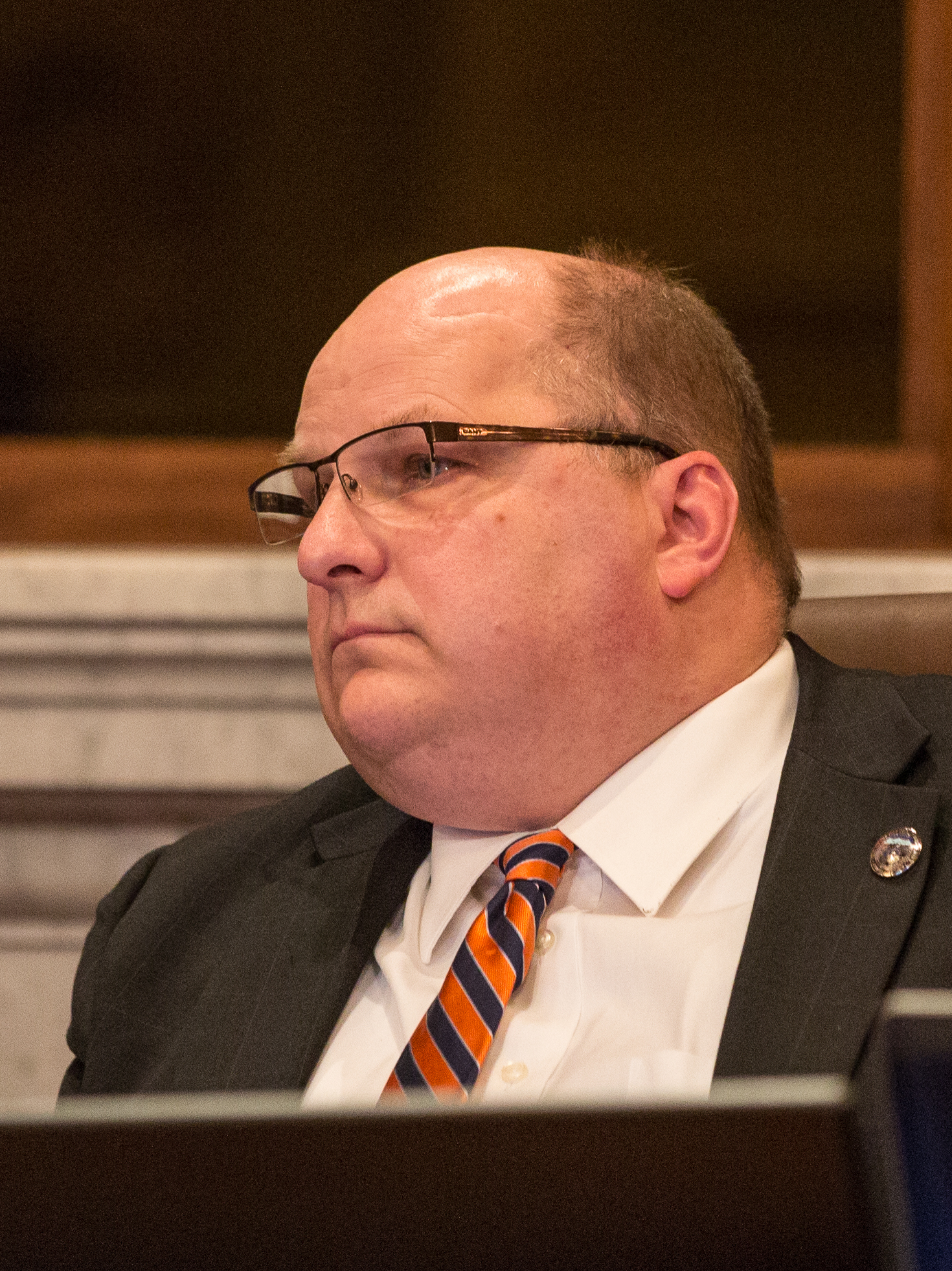
- Quincy in 2015 in the City Council chambers

Member of the Minneapolis City Council from the 11th Ward
- In office January 4, 2010 – January 8, 2018
- Preceded by: Scott Benson
- Succeeded by: Jeremy Schroeder

Personal details
- Born: John M. Quincy; 1962 or 1963 (age 63–64)
- Party: Democratic–Farmer–Labor
- Spouse: Anne
- Children: Two
- Education: DePaul University; Creighton University
- Occupation: Marketing consultant
- Website: Official website

John M. Quincy (born 1962 or 1963) is an American politician and marketing consultant living in Minneapolis. From 2010 to 2018, he served two terms on the Minneapolis City Council as a representative of the city's 11th Ward. Quincy moved to Minneapolis in 1994 and sought the endorsement of the Minnesota Democratic–Farmer–Labor Party (DFL) in 2006 for a seat on the Minneapolis Board of Education which he did not receive. He won both the DFL's endorsement and the 2009 City Council election and served as the head of several committees. He has also acted as a member of the Minneapolis–Saint Paul International Airport's Noise Oversight Committee.

== Early life and career ==
Born in 1962 or 1963, John M. Quincy earned a Bachelor of Science in Business Administration from Creighton University with a major in marketing and a concentration in finance. He subsequently received an MBA from DePaul University and moved to Minneapolis in 1994, where he worked as a marketing consultant.

Quincy was the co-chair of Field Community School's parent-teacher association. He sought the DFL endorsement for a seat on the Minneapolis Board of Education in 2006, focusing on bringing the voices of parents to the Board. Ultimately, he was not endorsed.

In 2009, Quincy vied for the DFL endorsement of his candidacy for a seat on the Minneapolis City Council representing the city's 11th Ward. (Note: Ward 11, on the southern edge of Minneapolis, is composed of the Wenonah, Diamond Lake, Hale, Page, Northrop, Windom, and Tangletown neighborhoods, as well as a portions of the Keewaydin and Field neighborhoods.) Incumbent Scott Benson had announced plans to vacate his seat after his second term and Quincy won the DFL's endorsement, with 94% support at the April DFL convention. In August 2009, the Southside Pride predicted that Quincy "should have a walk against" his opponents during the general election. He defeated Gregg A. Iverson and David A. Alvarado in the first round of voting (Note: Minneapolis uses ranked choice voting; the winner needed a majority (50%+1, disregarding fractions) of 2,006 or more votes, which Quincy clinched in the first round. No subsequent instant runoff rounds were required.) with 2,551 votes.

== Minneapolis City Council ==
=== First term ===
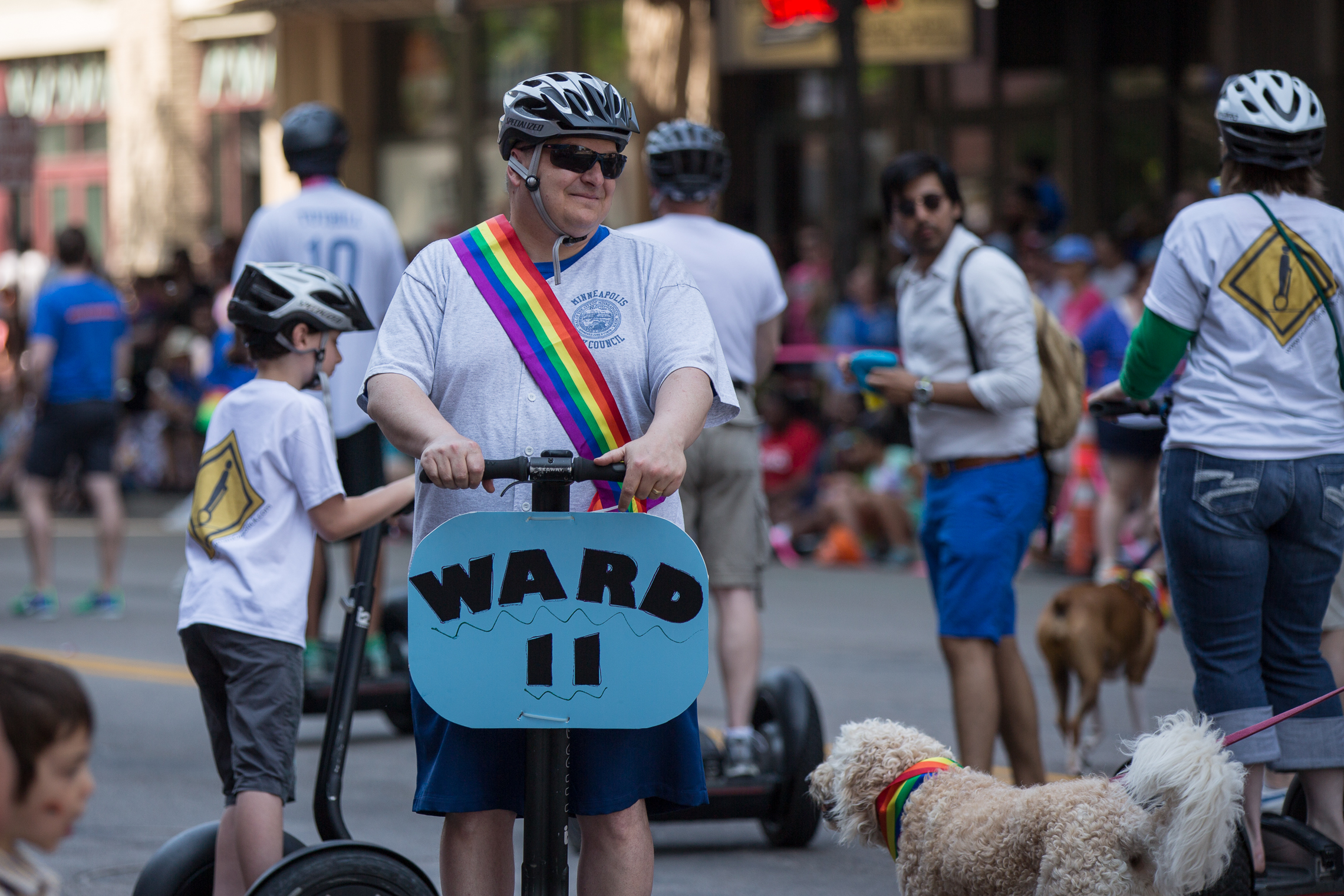
Quincy on a Segway in 2013

Quincy was sworn in for his first term on January 4, 2010, along with two other new members to the council. He was appointed to head the Elections and Rules Committee. He also served on the Minneapolis–Saint Paul International Airport's Noise Oversight Committee.

The Minneapolis City Council considered a plan to fund the U.S. Bank Stadium in 2012 which would circumvent a city charter requirement necessitating a public referendum for city funds in excess of $10 million to be spent on the construction of sports facilities. Quincy's stance on the issue was not known in February 2012, though he indicated support for the plan at that time for its building site and its predicted effect on property taxes. Ultimately, Quincy voted in favor of the plan to pay for the stadium with sales taxes once designated for the Minneapolis Convention Center.

In 2013, Quincy ran for a second term on the City Council and sought the DFL endorsement once again, which he won unopposed. He won the election against Bob Schlosser and Matt Steele in the first round with 4,952 votes.

=== Second term ===
After his reelection, Quincy assumed the role of chair of the Ways and Means Committee, which handles the city's budget.

In 2016, along with Minneapolis mayor Betsy Hodges, Quincy proposed a $300 million plan to improve the city's parks and roads over the next decade.

Quincy ran for a third term in the 2017 City Council election and lost his seat to challenger Jeremy Schroeder. His term ended on January 8, 2018, when Schroeder was sworn into office.

== Personal life ==
Quincy lived in Minneapolis's Page neighborhood as of 2006. His family consists of his wife Anne and two sons, Sam and Joe.

== Electoral history ==
Minneapolis City Council Ward 11 election, 2009
Political party/principle	Candidate	% 1st Choice	Round 1
DFL	John Quincy	63.62	2,551
DFL	Gregg A Iverson	18.30	734
Republican Party of Minnesota	David A Alvarado	17.56	704
N/A	Write-in	0.52	21
Maximum possible threshold			2,006
Valid votes			4,010
Undervotes			225
Turnout		21.20%	4,235
Registered voters			19,973

Minneapolis City Council Ward 11 election, 2013
Political party/principle	Candidate	% 1st Choice	Round 1
DFL	John Quincy	67.48	4,952
Independent	Matt Steele	27.97	2,053
Non-Party Affiliate	Bob Schlosser	4.48	329
N/A	Write-ins	0.07	5
Maximum possible threshold			3,901
Valid votes			7,339
Undervotes			460
Overvotes			1
Turnout		38.81%	7,800
Registered voters			20,100

Minneapolis City Council Ward 11 election, 2017
Party	Candidate	% 1st Choice	Round 1	Round 2	% Final
DFL	Jeremy Schroeder	35.26	3,230	4,757	51.93
DFL	John Quincy	34.93	3,200	3,981	43.46
DFL	Erica Mauter	29.43	2,696		
Write-in	N/A	0.37	34		
Exhausted ballots				422	4.61
Valid votes			9,160		
Threshold			4,581		
Undervotes			432		
Turnout		47.34%	9,592		
Registered voters			20,264		
