= Phillipe Cunningham =

Former Minneapolis city council member

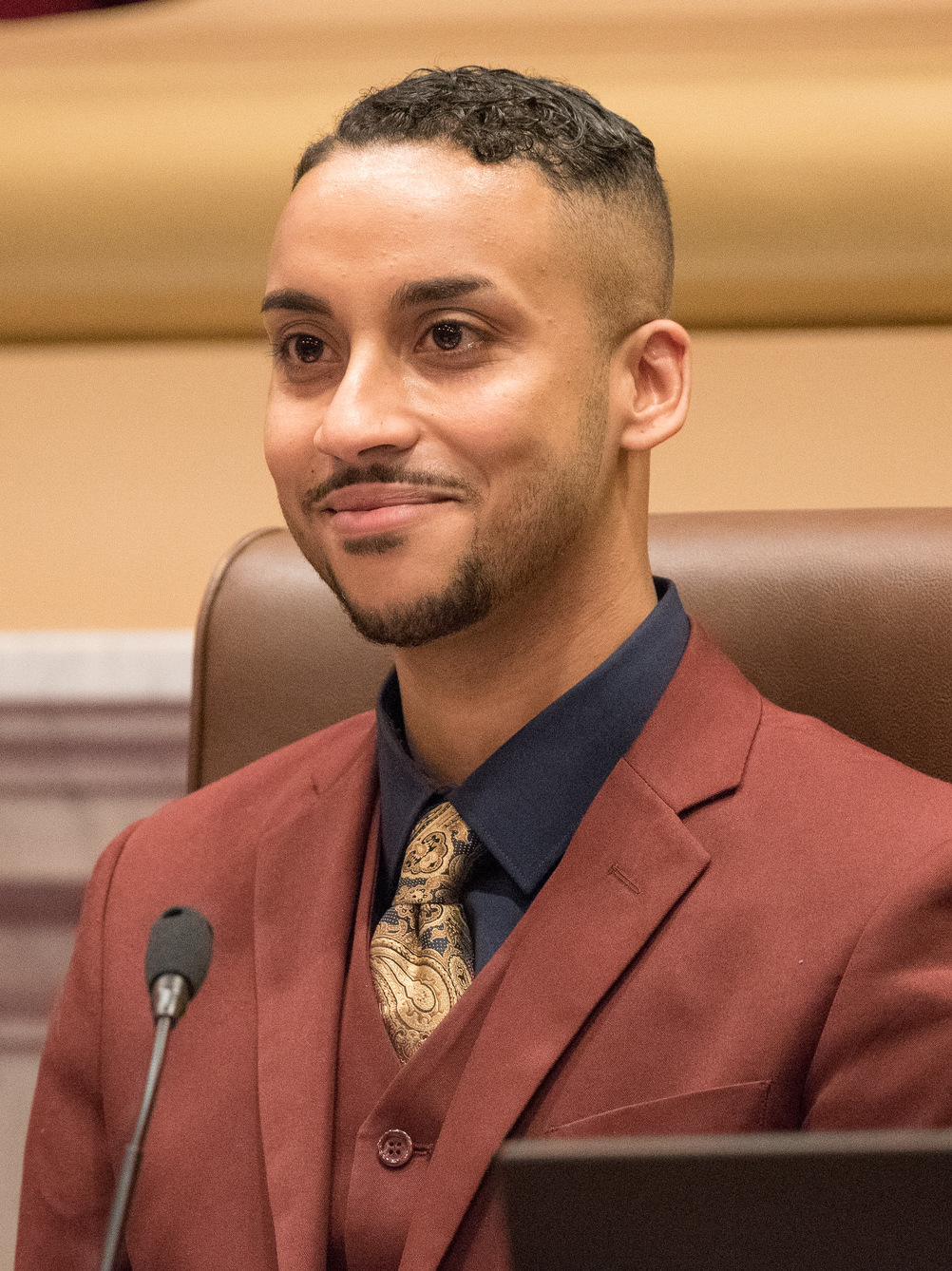
- Cunningham in 2018

Member of the Minneapolis City Council from the 4th Ward
- In office January 2, 2018 – January 3, 2022
- Preceded by: Barb Johnson
- Succeeded by: LaTrisha Vetaw

Personal details
- Born: Streator, Illinois, U.S.
- Party: Democratic
- Spouse: Lane Cunningham (m. 2015)
- Education: DePaul University (BA Claremont Lincoln University (MA)

Phillipe M. Cunningham is a former city council member for Minneapolis Ward 4 and was the first transgender man of color to be elected to public office in the United States. Cunningham won the council position in the 2017 Minneapolis City Council election and lost it in the 2021 election.

== Early life and education ==
Cunningham was born in Streator, Illinois, where he lived until he was 18. His father worked as a unionized tractor mechanic/builder for more than forty years, while his mother was a dry cleaner employee; he is their only child. He graduated from DePaul University with a Bachelor of Arts degree in Chinese studies. He transitioned during his junior year at DePaul, inspired by the life and work of Lou Sullivan.

== Career ==
In his early career, Cunningham worked as a special education teacher in Chicago Public Schools on the South Side of Chicago. Prior to his election to public office, Cunningham served on the City of Minneapolis's Youth Violence Prevention Executive Committee and as a senior policy aide for former Minneapolis Mayor Betsy Hodges.

On November 7, 2017, Cunningham was elected as the city council member for Minneapolis Ward 4, becoming the first transgender man of color to be elected to public office in the United States. Cunningham won over 20-year incumbent Barb Johnson by 175 votes. He was defeated on November 2, 2021, in the 2021 Minneapolis City Council election by LaTrisha Vetaw by a 61% to 30% vote. Ward 4 is the northwestern most ward in Minneapolis, and people of color and indigenous residents comprise 57 percent of the population.

Cunningham is currently the U.S. Lead of Global Leadership Programs at the Obama Foundation.

== Political views ==
Cunningham is a progressive Democrat.

=== Public safety ===
Cunningham advocates for the public health approach to public safety. After the murder of George Floyd, he joined a group of nine city council members who vowed to end the Minneapolis Police Department and create a new model for safety. Through the Safety for All Budget Plan, he secured permanent funding for violence prevention strategies like Next Step hospital-based bedside violence intervention. The Safety for All Budget Plan also institutionalized a new national model of a first-time gun offender diversion program, as well as launched the City of Minneapolis Behavioral Crisis Intervention Teams, unarmed social workers to respond to appropriate mental health crisis calls.

In 2021, Cunningham and colleagues allocated over $2M granted to Minneapolis from the American Rescue Plan Act of 2021 toward combatting human trafficking and sexual exploitation, adding after school programs and youth outreach, and group violence intervention programming for youth.

Cunningham was a panelist on President Barack Obama's 2020 Town Hall on Racial Justice and Policing on June 3, 2020 where he spoke about the public health approach to public safety and gave an update on Minneapolis in the immediate aftermath of George Floyd's murder by Minneapolis Police Department officers.

=== Community development ===
Cunningham led the planning process for the projected $350 million Upper Harbor Terminal redevelopment project which was approved. He also collaborated with Mayor Jacob Frey and state legislators to bring $27.5 million in state bonding investment for infrastructure redevelopment and development of a community performing arts center and amphitheater at the Upper Harbor Terminal site.

=== Housing ===
Cunningham led the creation, passage, and implementation of the Tenant Relocation Assistance ordinance, which requires landlords to provide 3 months rent to their tenants, if they lose their housing due to landlord negligence.

In November 2018, Cunningham drew attention for a post on Twitter for characterizing the concerns of opponents of the "Minneapolis 2040" plan as merely seeking to protect their "bungalow neighborhoods".

== Personal life ==
Cunningham is Black, queer, and transgender. On July 10, 2015, soon after same-sex marriage was legalized nationwide, Cunningham married Lane Cunningham, a software architect and small business owner. They met at Creating Change, an annual national conference for LGBTQ+ activists held by the National LGBTQ Task Force. They are passionate about rescuing hard to rehabilitate animals.

Cunningham has been a vegan since 2016.

== See also ==
- List of transgender public officeholders in the United States
