= Cam Gordon =

American politician (born 1955)

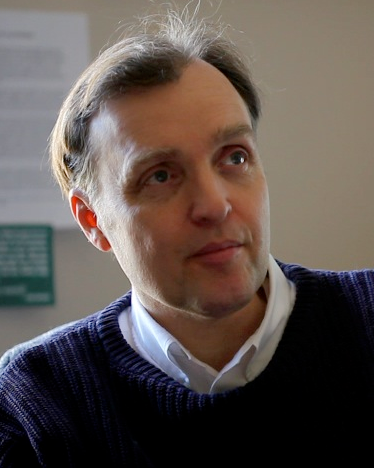
- Gordon in 2009

Member of the Minneapolis City Council
- In office 2006–2022
- Preceded by: Paul Zerby
- Succeeded by: Robin Wonsley
- Constituency: 2nd ward

Personal details
- Born: 1955 (age 70–71) Minneapolis, Minnesota, U.S.
- Party: Green
- Education: University of Minnesota; College of St. Catherine
- Website: http://secondward.blogspot.com (Personal blog)

Cameron A. Gordon (born 1955) is an American politician who was a Green Party member of the Minneapolis City Council from 2006 to 2022. He was a co-founder of the Green Party of Minnesota and was called "the most prominent Green elected official in the US."

== Early life and education ==
Gordon was born in Minneapolis, Minnesota in 1955. He graduated from Minneapolis's West High School in 1973. He earned a BS in secondary education from the University of Minnesota College of Education, graduating with distinction in 1977. He then attended the College of St. Catherine, focusing on Montessori education and early childhood development. He completed the primary level of the Montessori Teacher Certification Program in 1983 and the Prekindergarten Teaching Licensure Program in 1986. He taught at Child Garden Montessori School from 1980 to 1984.

Gordon co-owned River's Edge, a children's music company and child care program, from 1997 to 2005. Gordon was also an associate editor of the newspaper Public School Montessorian.

== Political career ==
Gordon was a co-founder of the Green Party of Minnesota, which was established in two founding conventions held in February and June 1994.

In 1996, Gordon was the Green Party candidate for District 62A seat in the Minnesota House of Representatives. He was backed by the Minnesota New Party and received 25% of the vote, the highest percentage for a third party state office candidate in the state of Minnesota in 50 years.

Gordon ran for Minneapolis City Council in 2001. He was defeated by DFL candidate Paul Zerby by 108 votes.

Gordon served on the policy board of the Minneapolis Neighborhood Revitalization Program.

On November 8, 2005, Cam Gordon was elected to represent Ward 2 on the Minneapolis City Council, defeating DFLer Cara J. Letofsky by 141 votes (2481 to 2340). He was endorsed by the Green Party of Minnesota, of which he was a former state party chair. Gordon was re-elected in 2009 with 84% of the vote, in 2013 with 87%, and in 2017 with 97%. He was only the non-DFL member of the council, and was elected Minority Leader of the council in 2014. Gordon chaired the Health, Environment and Community Engagement Committee. He was one of two elected Green Party members in the Minneapolis municipal government along with Minneapolis Park and Recreation Board commissioner Annie Young until her death in 2018.

=== Minneapolis City Council ===
==== 2005–2009 ====
Following a clash between the Minneapolis Police Department (MPD) and cyclists participating in a Critical Mass bike ride in August 2007, Gordon arranged for a meeting in City Hall between police officials and the riders.

During the lead up to the 2008 Republican National Convention in Saint Paul, Gordon was a member of the city council's Free Speech Committee. In the 2011 book Globalization and the Demolition of Society, Gordon was criticized for his vote giving the MPD legal authority to break up groups of people that are 25 or larger.

==== 2010–2014 ====
Gordon partnered with the Minnesota Public Interest Research Group and students from the University of Minnesota to enact an ordinance in 2011 requiring commercial business owners in Stadium Village to recycle.

Following the June 2011 arrest of CeCe McDonald and second-degree murder charges, Gordon announced his support for her, calling the incident "another example [of] transgender women of color being targeted for hate- and bias-related violence."

With councilmember Don Samuels, Gordon co-authored a resolution in 2012 requiring Minneapolis to take steps to ensure the city addresses racial disparities in hiring, contracts, and promotions. The resolution was the first of its kind in the United States and declared institutional racism "a primary reason for unemployment disparities."

In 2013, Gordon supported the construction of protected bike lanes on Minnehaha Avenue. In 2014, Gordon introduced an amendment to include electronic cigarettes in the Minneapolis smoking ban. The same year, Gordon expressed reservations about the expansion of the Metro Green Line Extension, ultimately voting against it, saying that he wanted his vote to reflect the remaining issues and concerns.

==== 2015–2016 ====
In 2015, Gordon co-sponsored a resolution to repeal ordinances in Minneapolis against spitting and lurking. Data from the MPD showed that, from 2009 to 2014, 59% of those arrested for lurking were African American. Gordon characterized the ordinances as a part of structural racism.

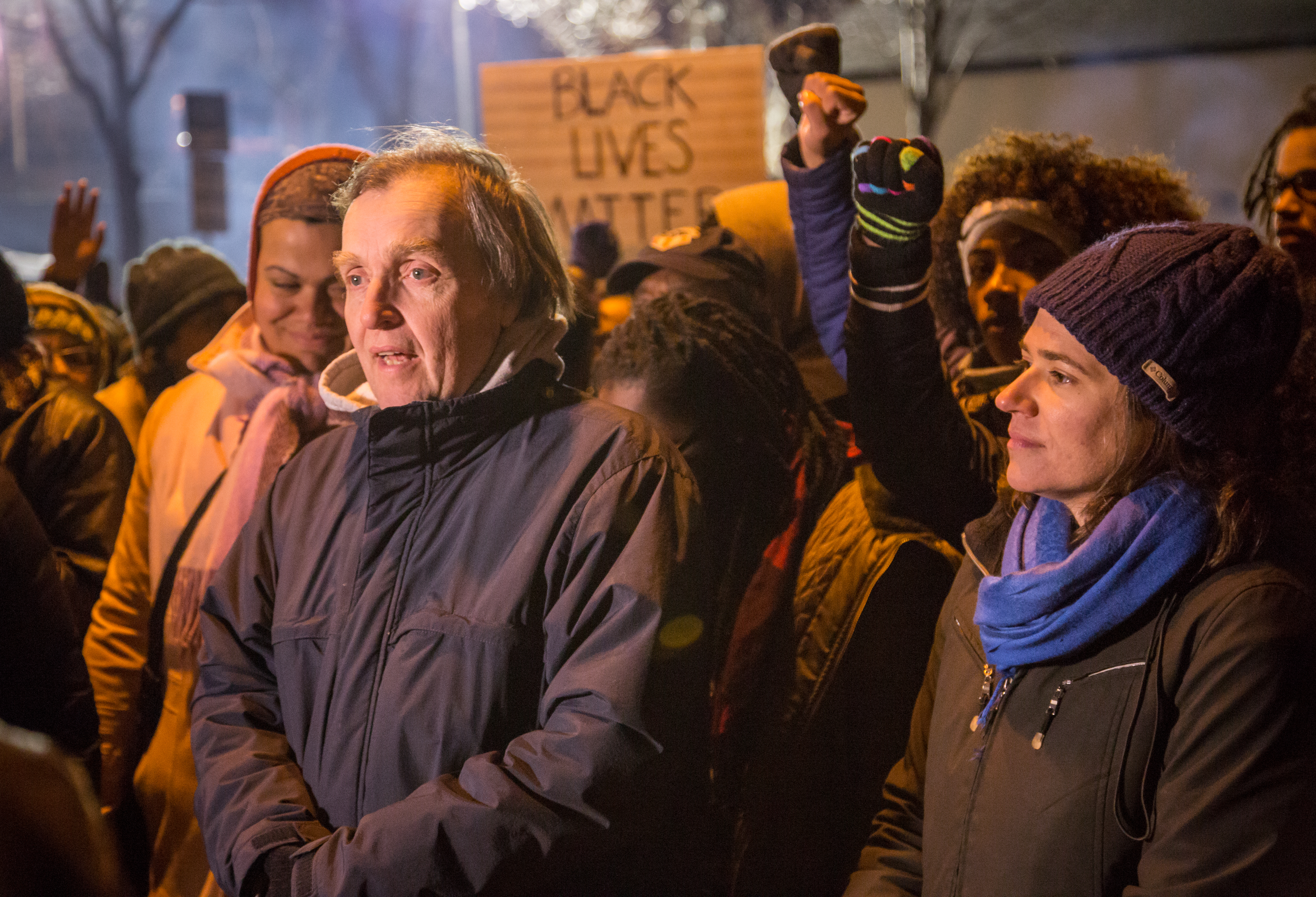
Gordon at the protest outside Minneapolis Police Department's 4th Precinct following the shooting of Jamar Clark, 2015

Later in 2015, alongside Congressman Keith Ellison and councilmembers Alondra Cano and Lisa Bender, Gordon showed his solidarity with Black Lives Matter protesters demanding the release of the police video showing the shooting of Jamar Clark. Gordon supported the demonstrators who set up an encampment outside the Fourth Precinct police station, drawing criticism from MPD Lieutenant Bob Kroll.

In March 2016, Gordon opposed a $129 million renovation of the Target Center arena, citing a requirement in the city charter that a referendum should be held for investments in professional sports facilities of over $10 million.

With fellow councilmember Abdi Warsame, Gordon authored the Bring Your Own Bag ordinance in 2016, which prohibited single-use plastic carryout bags with some exceptions. The plan originated in a citizen environmental advisory group.

In 2016, Gordon supported a proposal before the City Council to place an amendment on the ballot to raise the minimum wage in Minneapolis to $15 an hour.

In 2016, Gordon opposed a Minneapolis Public Housing Authority plan to tear down 184-unit Glendale Townhomes complex in southeast Minneapolis and replace them with a mixed-income development. He supported rehabilitation of the row houses and sided with Defend Glendale, a resident group opposed to demolition, writing, "I support Defend Glendale’s efforts to have their homes repaired and improved with no displacement and no gentrification." Gordon also worked with Defend Glendale on a historic designation proposal. Also in 2016, Gordon opposed a housing ordinance limiting the number of non-family members who may live within the same house. He deemed the ordinance arbitrary and said that it prevented the expansion of cooperative housing. Gordon proposed allowing landlords the ability to designate a single property that they owned an intentional community.

Gordon and councilmember Alondra Cano wrote a proposal for Minneapolis to study how it could end its relationship with banks investing in the fossil fuel industry, including Wells Fargo, which has ties to the Dakota Access Pipeline and also handles the city's financial activities.

== Electoral history ==
2001

2001 Minneapolis City Council Ward 2 election
Party	Candidate	Votes	%
Democratic (DFL)	Paul Zerby	2,597	50.77
Green	Cam Gordon	2,489	48.66
Write-in		29	0.57
Total votes		5,115	100

2005

Minneapolis City Council Ward 2 election, 2005
Political party/principle	Candidate	% 1st Choice	Round 1
Green Party of Minnesota	Cam Gordon	51.25	2,481
DFL	Cara Letofsky	48.34	2,340
N/A	Write-in	0.41	20

2009

Minneapolis City Council Ward 2 election, 2009
Political party/principle	Candidate	% 1st Choice	Round 1
Green Party of Minnesota	Cam Gordon	84.05	2,260
Independent	Allen A. Aigbogun	15.17	408
N/A	Write-in	0.77	21
Threshold: 1,345; Valid: 2,689; Undervotes: 153; Turnout: 2,842 (14.21%); Registered: 20,005

2013

Minneapolis City Council Ward 2 election, 2013
Political party/principle	Candidate	% 1st Choice	Round 1
Green Party of Minnesota	Cam Gordon	87.14	4,060
Socialist Workers Party	Diana Newberry	11.25	524
N/A	Write-ins	1.61	75
Threshold: 2,579; Valid: 4,659; Undervotes: 497; Turnout: 5,156 (27.56%); Registered: 18,705

2017

Party	Candidate	% 1st Choice	Round 1
Green Party of Minnesota	Cam Gordon	97.27	5,912
Write-in	N/A	2.73	166
Valid votes			6,078
Maximum possible threshold			3,518
Overvotes			1
Undervotes			955
Turnout (out of 17,702 registered voters)		39.74	7,034
Source: Minneapolis Elections & Voter Services

2021

Party	Candidate	% 1st Choice	Round 1	Round 2	Round 3	% Final
Democratic Socialists of America	Robin Wonsley	29.04%	2,763	2,879	4,046	50.09%
Minnesota Democratic–Farmer–Labor Party	Yusra Arab	28.49%	2,719	3,236	4,032	49.01%
Green Party of Minnesota	Cam Gordon (incumbent)	26.36%	2,508	2,800		
Minnesota Democratic–Farmer–Labor Party	Tom Anderson	10.28%	982			
Republican Party of Minnesota	Guy Gaskin	5.74%	546			
Write-in	N/A	0.09%	9			
Exhausted ballots				612	1,434	16.18%
Valid votes			9,527			
Threshold			4,764			
Undervotes			272			
Turnout		55.8%	9,799			
Source: Minneapolis Elections & Voter Services
