= Lisa Bender =

American politician and city planner

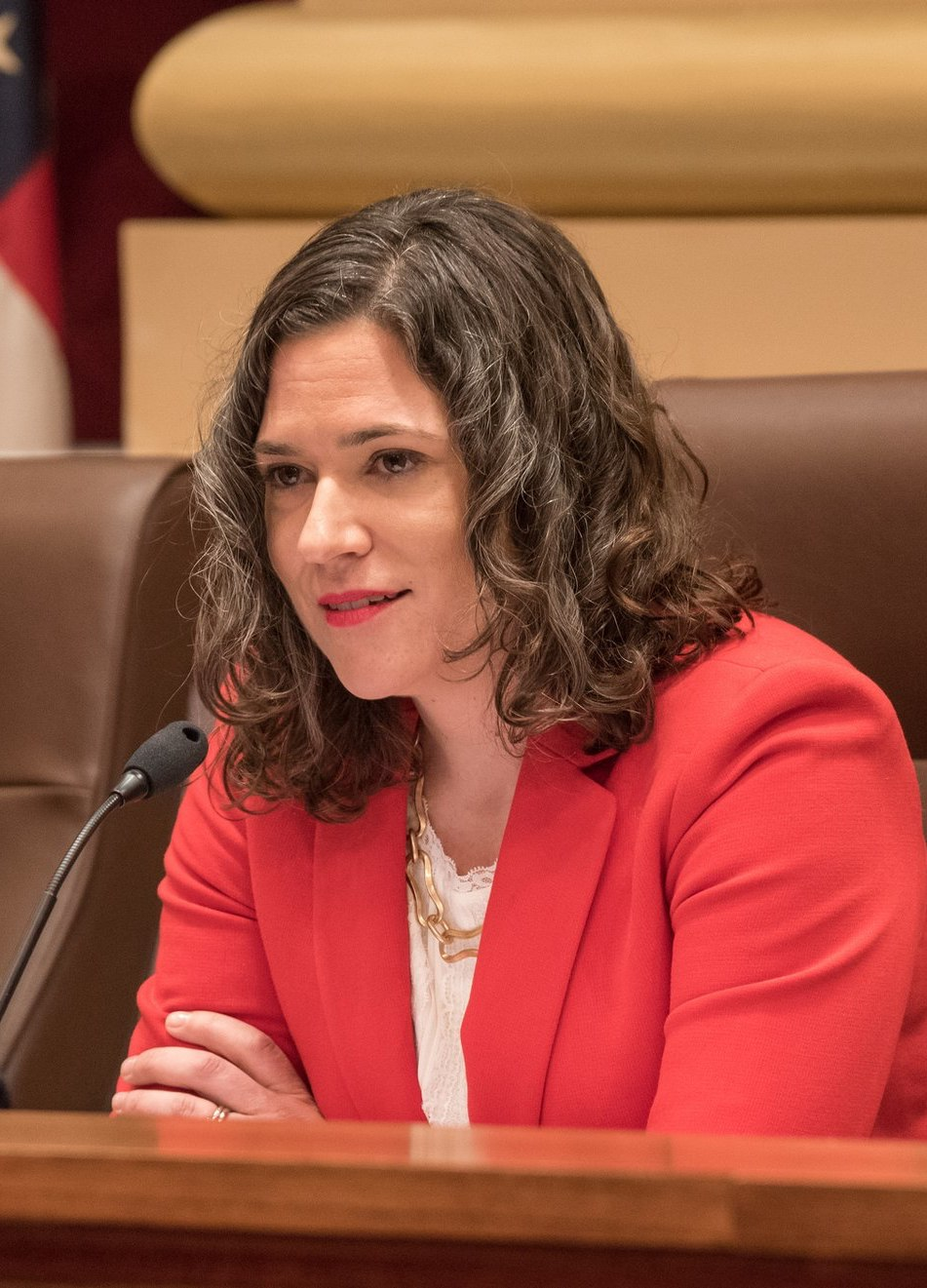
- Bender in 2018

President of the Minneapolis City Council
- In office January 8, 2018 – January 3, 2022
- Vice President: Andrea Jenkins
- Preceded by: Barb Johnson
- Succeeded by: Andrea Jenkins

Member of the Minneapolis City Council from the 10th Ward
- In office January 6, 2014 – January 3, 2022
- Preceded by: Meg Tuthill
- Succeeded by: Aisha Chughtai

Personal details
- Born: Elizabeth Peterson Shoreview, Minnesota, U.S.
- Party: Democratic (DFL)
- Education: University of Minnesota (BA); University of California, Berkeley (MA)
- Occupation: City Planner
- Website: Official website

Elizabeth Peterson "Lisa" Bender is an American politician, city planner, and a former member of the Minneapolis City Council from the 10th Ward. In 2018, she was unanimously elected president of the Minneapolis City Council.

== Early life and education ==
Bender completed a bachelor's degree from the University of Minnesota in Spanish and Biology. She received her master's degree in City and Regional Planning from University of California, Berkeley in 2007.

== Career ==
=== Early career ===
In 2001, she moved to New York City and worked as the Communications Director for the Institute for Transportation and Development Policy, traveling across the world advocating for biking, walking, and non-motorized transportation.

Bender worked for the City of San Francisco as a city planner before returning to Minnesota in 2009 where she worked for Hennepin County before moving to the Minnesota Department of Transportation to manage Minnesota's Safe Routes to School program. She co-founded the Minneapolis Bicycle Coalition, an advocacy organization working to make riding a bike safer in Minneapolis.

In 2012, Bender decided to challenge incumbent Meg Tuthill for the DFL endorsement for a seat on the Minneapolis City Council representing the city's 10th Ward. After six ballots and five hours, she secured the party's endorsement over Tuthill and two other challengers. She defeated Tuthill in the general election on November 5, 2013 with 62.4% of the vote.

=== Minneapolis City Council ===
Bender was sworn into office on January 6, 2014. She was named chair of the city's Zoning and Planning Committee, at the time one of only two first-term council members to chair a standing committee of the council.

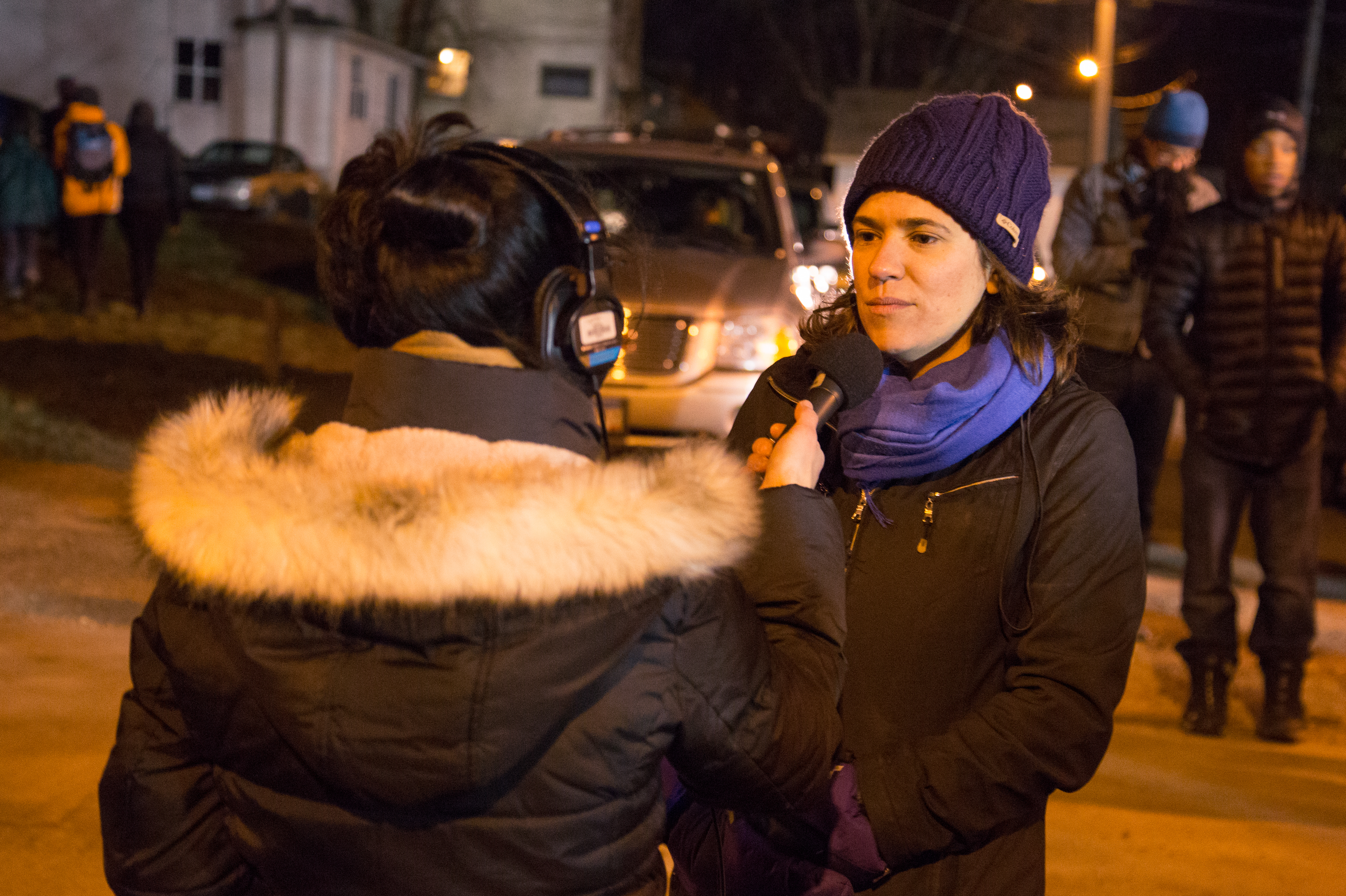
Bender being interviewed by a reporter on November 19, 2015, outside the Minneapolis Police Department's Fourth Precinct during the fifth night of demonstrations following the shooting death of Jamar Clark.

During her first term, Bender focused on creating a safe transportation system for pedestrians, expanding affordable housing choices, fighting for workers protections and higher wages, supporting community and environmental health, and restructuring the public safety apparatus. She authored the city's complete streets ordinance, protected bikeway update to the Bicycle Master Plan, accessory dwelling unit ordinance and landmark paid sick leave ordinance, establishing Minneapolis as the first city in the Midwest guaranteeing workers the ability to accrue up to 48 hours of sick and safe time each year. In 2015, she authored an ordinance eliminating or reducing the minimum parking requirement for new residential developments along high-frequency transit routes. The Obama Administration highlighted Bender's parking reform ordinance in its 2016 Housing Development Toolkit as a successful initiative to lessen housing costs, reduce pollution, traffic congestion, and improve economic development.

In addition to serving as the chair of the Zoning and Planning Committee during her first term, Bender sat on the Committee of the Whole, the Elections and Rules Committee, the Health, Environment, and Community Engagement Committee, the Taxes Committee, the Transportation and Public Works Committee, and the Ways and Means Committee.

She was named L'Etoile Magazine's MVP of the year in 2015. In 2016, she was named one of Minneapolis/St. Paul Business Journal's People to Watch.

On April 22, 2017, Bender was endorsed by the DFL for a second term. Bender won her re-election campaign on November 7, 2017, making her the first incumbent in over 20 years to do so in the ward.

Following the 2017 elections, Bender was unanimously elected by her colleagues as the new President of the Minneapolis City Council.

Bender also sat as the vice-chair of the Transportation and Public Works Committee, the Elections and Rules Committee, and the Executive Committee, along with being a member of the Zoning and Planning Committee, the Budget Committee, the Housing Policy and Development Committee, the Committee of the Whole, and the Intergovernmental Relations Committee.

After the city sent warnings to homeowners about a crackdown on shoveling enforcement, Bender accused the Star Tribune of sexism when their reporter found she was the only City Council member who had complaints against her (seven were recorded) and a fine ($149) for un-shoveled walks. The city had sent and paid a shoveler to clear her sidewalks.

In June 2020, in response to the murder of George Floyd and subsequent protests, Bender and a veto proof majority of the City Council attended a community meeting at Powderhorn Park. At the meeting, Bender said, "Our commitment is to end our city's toxic relationship with the Minneapolis Police Department, to end policing as we know it, and to re-create systems of public safety that actually keep us safe." From that meeting, she started a process to dismantle and abolish the Minneapolis Police Department. The police abolition movement in Minneapolis, as with similar movements nationally, remains controversial. Steven Belton, the Black CEO and President of the Urban League Twin Cities, called the move irresponsible and accused council members of failing to consult with the Black community, particularly those on the North Side.

Bender also received criticism for an on-air interview with CNN's Alisyn Camerota in which Bender called for "a future without police." Camerota then asked: "What if in the middle of night, my home is broken into? Who do I call?" Bender replied: "Yes, I mean, I hear that loud and clear from a lot of my neighbors. And I know – and myself, too, and I know that that comes from a place of privilege. Because for those of us for whom the system is working, I think we need to step back and imagine what it would feel like to already live in that reality where calling the police may mean more harm is done."

Bender was one author of a proposed charter amendment that would have replaced the "complete control" over police policy granted to the Mayor by the charter with the same structure that allows for council oversight of other departments. The city's Charter Commission, a county-appointed board, voted to delay 90 days to propose alternatives, effectively delaying the ballot measure until the 2021 city-wide election. Despite her efforts, the proposed charter amendment did not get voted in during the 2021 Minneapolis City Council election, and her attempts to disband the Minneapolis Police Department failed.

Bender announced she would not seek reelection to the city council in 2021, and was replaced by Aisha Chughtai.

== Personal life ==
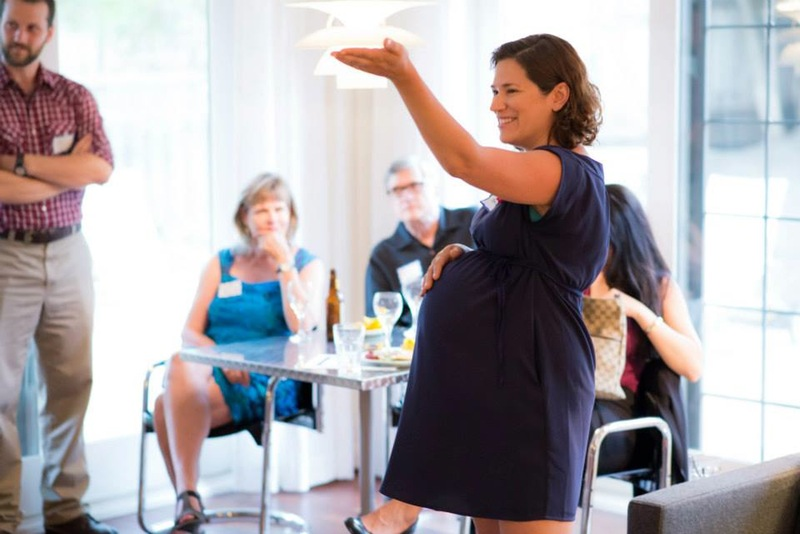
Lisa Bender at a campaign event in 2013

Bender is a year-round bicycle commuter.

In 2010, Bender was diagnosed with stage II breast cancer 11 weeks into her first pregnancy. She has since recovered.

Three weeks before election day, Bender gave birth to her second daughter in October 2013.

In the 2016 Democratic Party presidential primaries, Bender was the only elected official in Minneapolis to endorse the Bernie Sanders campaign. She served as the campaign's surrogate before the local media on caucus night when Sanders won Minnesota and was elected to be a delegate at the 2016 Democratic National Convention in Philadelphia. Bender later supported Hillary Clinton in the 2016 general election and Elizabeth Warren in the 2020 Democratic presidential primary.

== Electoral history ==
Minneapolis City Council Ward 10 election, 2013
| Political party/principle | Candidate | % 1st Choice | Round 1 |
|---|---|---|---|
| DFL | Lisa Bender | 62.43 | 3,704 |
| DFL | Meg Tuthill | 29.19 | 1,732 |
| Independent | Nate Griggs | 3.81 | 226 |
| Independent | Scott Hargarten | 1.62 | 96 |
| Maximum possible threshold | | | 2,967 |
| Total Ballots Cast | | | 5,933 |

Minneapolis City Council Ward 10 election, 2017
| Political party/principle | Candidate | % 1st Choice | Round 1 |
|---|---|---|---|
| DFL | Lisa Bender | 64.34 | 4,883 |
| DFL | Saralyn Romanishan | 20.57 | 1,561 |
| DFL | David Schorn | 9.34 | 709 |
| Republican | Bruce Lundeen | 5.48 | 416 |
| Maximum possible threshold | | | 5,933 |
| Total Ballots Cast | | | 7911 |
| Undervotes | | | 322 |
