= Andrew Johnson (Minnesota politician) =

American politician

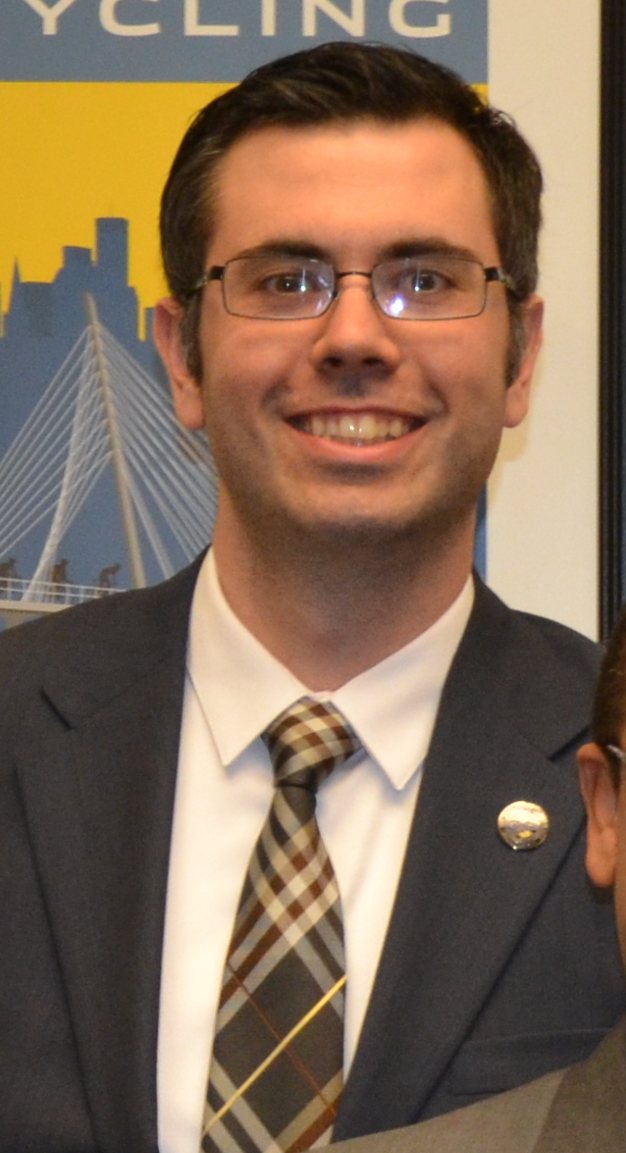
- Johnson in 2014

Member of the Minneapolis City Council from the 12th Ward
- In office January 6, 2014 – November 21, 2023
- Preceded by: Sandy Colvin Roy
- Succeeded by: Aurin Chowdhury

Personal details
- Born: 1983 or 1984 (age 41–42)
- Party: Democratic–Farmer–Labor
- Spouse: Sara Vine (m. 2016)
- Education: University of Minnesota Normandale Community College
- Occupation: Systems engineer
- Website: Official website

Andrew Johnson (born 1983 or 1984) is an American politician and systems engineer from Minneapolis, who represented the city's 12th Ward on the Minneapolis City Council from 2014 to 2023. Formerly President of the Longfellow Community Council, Johnson was first elected in 2013 as a member of the Minnesota Democratic–Farmer–Labor Party (DFL) and became the council's youngest sitting member at 29 years old. During his first term, he focused on ridding outdated, contradictory, and burdensome rules from the city's code of ordinances.

== Early life ==
Born in 1983 or 1984, Andrew Johnson grew up with a single mother, mowing lawns and bagging groceries at a Lunds at 50th & France in Edina, Minnesota. He graduated from Normandale Community College with an associate degree before studying political science at the University of Minnesota. Johnson got a job as a systems engineer at Target Corporation and bought a house in the Longfellow neighborhood of Minneapolis in 2010. By chance, he attended the Longfellow Community Council's (LCC) annual meeting where he was elected to its board and, following his first term, was elected council president.

== Minneapolis City Council ==
=== Election ===
While serving on the LCC, Johnson dealt with glaucoma, an experience that led him to reevaluate how he was living his life and ultimately led him to run for a seat on the Minneapolis City Council. Johnson vied for the endorsement of the DFL at their convention in April 2013, facing incumbent councilmember Sandy Colvin Roy who had served on the Council since 1997, longer than all but one other councilmember. Colvin Roy, who represented the city's 12th Ward, (Note: Ward 12, in the southeast corner of Minneapolis, is composed of the Howe, Standish, Hiawatha, Ericsson, Minnehaha, and Morris Park neighborhoods, as well as a portion of the Keewaydin neighborhood.) had previously supported bypassing a provision in the city's charter requiring a public referendum to approve the construction of U.S. Bank Stadium. The DFL convention resulted in no endorsement for Ward 12 and Johnson attributed Colvin Roy's support for bypassing the charter as a reason for the lack of an endorsement. Colvin Roy dropped her bid for a fifth term on the Council on June 17, leaving Johnson to face Chris Lautenschlager of the Green Party. Johnson officially filed his candidacy on July 30. In the election on November 5, he faced Lautenschlager, Charlie Casserly, Ben Gisselman, and Dick Franson, winning with 4,553 votes in the first round of voting. (Note: Minneapolis uses ranked choice voting; the winner needed a majority (50%+1, disregarding fractions) of 4,372 or more votes, which Johnson clinched in the first round. No subsequent instant runoff rounds were required.)

=== First term ===
Johnson was sworn into office on January 6, 2014, along with six other new members of the 13-member body. At 29 years old, he became the youngest sitting member of the Minneapolis City Council, as well as the city's only single city councilmember as of 2014.

Johnson described three categories into which he divides his workflow: ward, city, and enterprise. He considers ward work to be specific to concerns of residents and businesses of the 12th Ward, such as stop sign placement or library hours. City work includes citywide efforts like transportation projects (such as the Metro Green Line Extension) or environmental ordinances, and Johnson considers enterprise work to be any that improves the efficiency and accessibility of city government.

The Southside Pride characterized Johnson as likely to continue departing 9th Ward councilmember Gary Schiff's legacy of providing a "leftward pull of DFL progressivism on the Council." During his first term, Johnson has worked on overhauling rules from Minneapolis's code of ordinances that he sees as outdated, contradictory, or obstructive to small businesses. These efforts have led to lowering licensing fees for second-hand shops, making it more accessible for businessowners to have murals on their buildings, eliminating an ordinance banning patrons from wearing hats in movie theaters. During his first term, he has also authored an ordinance to clarify Minneapolis's rules on pets and wildlife, including making urban chicken coops more accessible, permitting the ownership of reptiles, and instituting a no-kill policy for the city's animal control agency. He led an effort to end the city of Minneapolis's IT services contract with Unisys at an annual savings of $3 million to the city and introduced language eliminating the requirement for single-use restrooms in city businesses to be designated either female or male, allowing instead for gender neutral single-use bathrooms.

Johnson decided not to run for reelection in the 2023 city council elections, saying that he "always [had] looked at public service as something that you do temporarily".

== Personal life ==
Johnson married Sara Vine in June 2016.

== Electoral history ==
Most voted first-choice candidate by precinct in Ward 12.

Minneapolis City Council Ward 12 election, 2017
Party	Candidate	% 1st Choice	Round 1
Minnesota Democratic–Farmer–Labor Party	Andrew Johnson (incumbent)	87.15	8,874
Independent	Will Jaeger	9.40	957
Independent	Harrison Bullard	3.10	316
Write-in	N/A	0.34	35
Valid votes			10,182
Maximum possible threshold			5,353
Undervotes			522
Turnout (out of 22,735 registered voters)		47.08	10,704
Source: Minneapolis Elections & Voter Services

Minneapolis City Council Ward 12 election, 2013
Political party/principle	Candidate	% 1st Choice	Round 1
DFL	Andrew Johnson	54.33	4,553
DFL	Ben Gisselman	17.04	1,428
Independent	Charlie Casserly	13.79	1,156
Green Party of Minnesota	Chris Lautenschlager	10.93	916
DFL	Dick Franson	3.51	294
N/A	Write-ins	0.41	34
Maximum possible threshold			4,372
Valid votes			8,381
Undervotes			360
Overvotes			1
Turnout		39.54%	8,742
Registered voters			22,108
