= Libertarian Party of Minnesota =

State affiliate of the Libertarian Party

- Chairperson: Rebecca Whiting
- Founded: 1972; 54 years ago
- Headquarters: 1710 Douglas Dr N, STE 225U, Golden Valley, Minn., 55422
- Membership (May 2022): 350
- Ideology: Libertarianism (American)
- National affiliation: Libertarian Party
- Colors: Gold/Yellow
- Senate: 0 / 67
- House of Representatives: 0 / 134
- U.S. Senate: 0 / 2
- U.S. House of Representatives: 0 / 8

Website
- www.lpmn.org

The Libertarian Party of Minnesota is a state affiliate of the United States Libertarian Party. They have been recognized by the State as a minor party since 2012.

== History ==
The Libertarian Party of Minnesota was formed in 1972 after Charles Brekke and Steve Richardson wrote to the Libertarian Party, headquartered in Colorado, requesting to charter a state group. They were joined by Frank Haws and Rich Kleinow, who were independently seeking a way to get Libertarian Party Presidential candidate Dr. John Hospers on the ballot in Minnesota.

The first meeting of the LPMN was held at Brekke's home in Minneapolis, where Ed Contoski was elected as the LPMN's first party chair, Rich Kleinow was elected vice chairman, Charles Brekke secretary, and Claudia Jenson treasurer. The original signers of the LPMN charter, considered the founders of the LPMN and the first executive committee, were:

- Ed Contoski (chair)
- Rich Kleinow (vice chair)
- Claudia Jensen (treasurer)
- Charles Brekke (secretary)
- Georgiena Brekke
- Jack Buxell
- Jane Buxell
- Franklin Haws
- Arnette Putman
- Marc Putman
- Stephen Richardson

In 1974, Rich Kleinow and Claudia Jensen were the first two candidates for the Libertarian Party of Minnesota, on the ballot for governor and lieutenant governor, respectively. Kleinow/Jensen received 1,858 votes and came in 7th place. Dale Hemming, LPMN Chair in 1976, ran for Congress in 1976 and 1978.
