= Lisa Goodman (politician) =

American politician (born 1966)

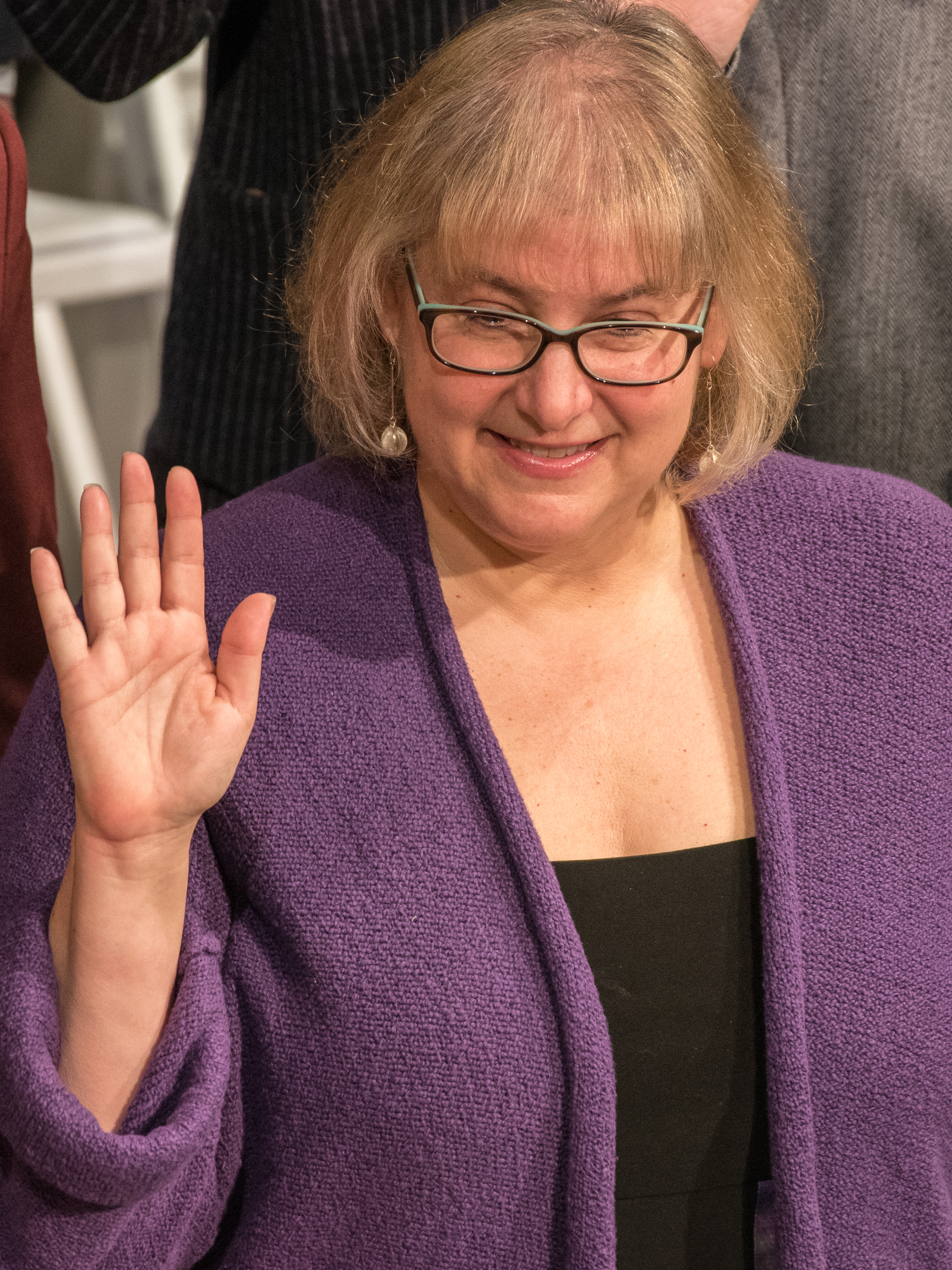
- Goodman in 2018

Member of the Minneapolis City Council from the 7th Ward
- In office 1998 – January 1, 2024
- Preceded by: Pat Scott
- Succeeded by: Katie Cashman

Personal details
- Born: Lisa Ruth Goodman; January 27, 1966 (age 60) Chicago, Illinois
- Party: Democratic–Farmer–Labor
- Education: University of Wisconsin–Madison (BA)
- Website: Official website

Lisa Ruth Goodman (born 1966) is an American politician who served as a member of the Minneapolis City Council from the 7th ward. First elected in 1997 and continuously re-elected for 26 years, she was the longest-serving member in council history. The 7th ward holds some of Minnesota's wealthiest neighborhoods, including Bryn Mawr, Cedar-Isles-Dean, Downtown West, East Isles, Elliot Park, Kenwood, Loring Park, Lowry Hill, and Stevens Square.

Goodman was born in Chicago and earned a bachelor's degree from the University of Wisconsin–Madison. She served as executive director of the Minnesota chapter of NARAL.

== Early life and education ==
Goodman is a native of Chicago, Illinois. She received a Bachelor of Arts in political science and labor relations from the University of Wisconsin–Madison. She interned at the Dane County AFL–CIO.

== Career ==
=== Early career ===
In 1989, Goodman moved to Minneapolis from Madison, Wisconsin where she had spent a year fundraising for Mayor Paul Soglin. She joined the 1990 United States Senate campaign of Paul Wellstone, serving as chief fundraiser. She then worked for a year as development director of a college service-learning nonprofit before being hired as the executive director of the Minnesota chapter of NARAL in 1992. Goodman formerly taught a course in community and economic development at the University of Minnesota's Humphrey School of Public Affairs.

=== Minneapolis City Council ===
Goodman was elected to the Minneapolis City Council in 1997, with 54% of the vote. She was the longest-serving member of the Minneapolis City Council. While city council seats are officially nonpartisan, Goodman is affiliated with the Minnesota Democratic–Farmer–Labor Party. During her career, Goodman has voted for the preservation of historic buildings. She is considered to be pro-development and has consistently called for expansion of the Minneapolis Police Department (MPD). Goodman chairs the Business, Inspections, Housing, and Zoning committee and the Minneapolis Community Development Agency.

A 2007 article about Goodman in the City Pages detailed her close relationships with developers. She sat on the Community Development Committee that approved condo developments. After convincing developers to build the Grant Park luxury condos in a blighted area, she then purchased one of the units, later selling it in 2005 for $315,000. Goodman's relationship with former Minneapolis DFL chair Michael Krause and former Empowerment Zone head Kim Havey came under scrutiny when their company, Kandiyohi Development Partners, began bidding for a wood-burning power plant. Goodman had invested in the company in 2006. She wrote a letter on campaign stationery urging the Minnesota Pollution Control Agency to give Kandiyohi a permit, initially failing to disclose her status as an investor.

In 2012, Goodman was among six council members who voted against funding the new Vikings stadium through redirected sales taxes. In 2015, Goodman was the only member of the city council to vote against a study examining the impact of raising the minimum wage. Later in 2017 she voted in support of the $15 minimum wage.

Prior to a candidate's forum in 2017, Goodman asked challenger Teqen Zéa-Aida if he would hold her chewing gum. She then took the gum out of her mouth and placed it in his hand. She later apologized, saying that it was an attempt at humor.

Goodman has worked to fund the Cedar Lake Trail extension to the river. She has said "I don't believe that we should be using bike lanes as a way to get people out of their cars." Goodman voted against municipal consent for the Metro Green Line Extension. In 2018, Goodman voted in favor of the 2040 comprehensive plan. When announcing the city's planned renovation of Peavey Plaza, Goodwin commented of the downtown Minneapolis park, "like all 45-year-old women, sometimes you just need a face-lift." Following concerns over her comments, she said she was sorry if anyone was offended. Goodman also supported banning new drive-throughs for fast food restaurants and banks in 2019. Governor Tim Walz appointed her to the Minnesota Racing Commission in 2019.

Following a proposal from Mayor Jacob Frey to add 14 police officers including eight neighborhood officers in 2019, Goodman said it was a "drop in the bucket compared to what is needed at this point in time." She joined downtown business interests asking for more police officers and went on to say that she could find budget items to cut that would fund the hiring of at least 24 neighborhood officers.

After the murder of George Floyd and resulting protests in 2020, Goodman was one of three council members who refused to sign a pledge to work towards defunding the police department. Later in the year, Goodman voted against a measure to shift management of police media from the MPD to city officials and against a proposed amendment to the city charter that would have transferred some of the mayoral authority over the MPD to the council. In August 2020, a downtown riot occurred following rumors that the MPD killed a black man. Goodman said she was "disgusted" by the rioters and decried damage to the Lotus Restaurant, saying "none of this did anything to advance racial justice in our city." In November 2020, Goodman voted in favor of a proposal to spend nearly $500,000 to hire police officers from outside the MPD to deal with shortages.

Goodman, when asked about her few city council members' efforts to try to change the Kahn rule before the 2021 election, said it "seems a little bit self-serving."

Goodman left office in 2023 as the longest serving Minneapolis city council member. She was named the city's Director of Strategic Initiatives in September 2024.

== Personal life ==
Goodman owns a hobby farm in Kandiyohi County that she initially purchased with Michael Krause and Kim Havey.

Goodman lived in a condo in the Bellevue building in downtown Minneapolis before moving to the Bryn Mawr neighborhood. In 2012, Goodman married Ben Horn, who owns FinnStyle, a Finnish-design home store. The architectural style of their glass-walled home, situated on a wooded lot bordering the Theodore Wirth Parkway, was not to Goodman's taste, she added a green roof and has "slowly warmed" to the aesthetic. They divorced in 2016.

In October 2017, Goodman purchased a house in the Bryn Mawr neighborhood for $480,000. Following an assessment of her property at over $500,000, she filed a petition with the Minnesota Tax Court and succeeded in securing a $40,000 reduction in its assessed value.
