= Green Party of Minnesota =

Minnesota affiliate of the US Green Party

- Founded: 1994
- Headquarters: 4200 Cedar Ave S. Suite 8 Minneapolis, MN 55407
- Ideology: Green politics
- Political position: Left-wing
- National affiliation: Green Party of the United States
- Colors: Green
- Senate: 0 / 67
- House of Representatives: 0 / 134
- U.S. Senate: 0 / 2
- U.S. House of Representatives: 0 / 8
- Minneapolis City Council: 0 / 13

Website
- mngreens.nationbuilder.com//

The Green Party of Minnesota is a green political party in the U.S. state of Minnesota. It is affiliated with the Green Party of the United States.

== History ==
The Minnesota Greens Confederation, founded c. 1990–1991, fostered the development of local Green Party organizations in the state. The Green Party of Minnesota was organized in December 1993. It was officially established in February and June 1994 at two founding conventions.

Twin Cities Greens was organized in 1988. The Green Party of St. Paul was established in 1997 to 1998.

The Green Party of Minnesota was founded in 1994 on the Four Pillars of the Green Party: Ecological Wisdom, Social and Economic Justice, Grassroots Democracy, and Nonviolence and Peace.

In the 2000 presidential election, Green Party presidential nominee Ralph Nader and vice presidential nominee Winona LaDuke received 5% of the vote in Minnesota, which earned major party status for the Green Party in Minnesota. But in the election of 2004, neither Green Party presidential nominee David Cobb nor any candidate for statewide office received 5% or more, thus losing major party status in the state.

In 2003, Elaine Fleming became the first elected Green mayor in Minnesota. Fleming was mayor of Cass Lake, Minnesota, and was elected mayor for her first term by seven votes. Fleming was elected mayor for a second term as a write-in candidate. As of 2006, Fleming was serving her second and last term as Mayor.

While the party is currently defined as a minor political party, it has had recent success in some city elections, especially in Minneapolis and St. Paul. In 2005, Cam Gordon, a former chair of the Green Party of Minnesota, was elected in Ward 2 to the Minneapolis City Council, winning over DFLer Cara Letofsky in a 51% to 48% vote. Ward 2 is considered one of the most diverse areas of Minneapolis, representing the University of Minnesota Minneapolis Campus and the Cedar-Riverside and Seward neighborhoods. Despite this gain on the council, two Green incumbents on the council, Natalie Johnson Lee (Ward 6) and Dean Zimmermann (Ward 7), were unseated during the 2005 election. Redistricting had pitted both against other council incumbents.

While initially elected as a Democrat in 1986 to the Minneapolis Park Board, Annie Young ran as a Green from her third term on, becoming one of the longest serving Park Board Commissioners in Minneapolis history.

In 2009, Cam Gordon was re-elected to Minneapolis City Council. In 2011, Green Party endorsed Laura Libby was elected to the Section 1 seat of the City Council of Crystal, Minnesota. Cam Gordon was elected to a third term on the Minneapolis City Council in 2013.

In 2014, the Green Party of Minnesota ran former DFL State Representative Andy Dawkins for Attorney General receiving 1.49% of the vote statewide and regaining minor party status.

Despite restrictive Minnesota ballot access laws, volunteers collected three times the required signatures to place Green endorsed presidential candidate Dr Jill Stein on the ballot in 2016. Minnesota Secretary of State Steve Simon refused to replace the ballot petitions stand-in vice presidential candidate Howie Hawkins with Ajamu Baraka, the only candidate of color in the race, despite no law denying his ability to do so. Dr. Jill Stein went on to receive 1.26% of the vote statewide – double the Green presidential vote from 2012 – and again securing minor party status for the Green Party of Minnesota until 2020.

Three additional Greens were elected in 2016, including the first elected Green in Ramsey County history – Lena Buggs winning a seat on the Ramsey County Soil & Water District Board unseating the incumbent. In Anoka County, Greens Sharon Lemay and Steve Laitinen were both elected to the Anoka County Soil and Water District Board as well.

In 2018, Paula Overby was Minnesota Green Party's United States Senate nominee by petitioning the state for ballot access, receiving 23,101 votes in the four-way race on November 6. Overby's campaign focused on third party political reform, making the elections process more engaging and more responsive to people's needs.

== Current and past elected officials ==
City councils

- Cam Gordon, Minneapolis City Council, Ward 2, (2006-2022).

Boards and commissions

- Samantha Pree-Stinson, Minneapolis Board of Estimate and Taxation, At-Large (2022–2026)

== Ideology ==
The Green Party of Minnesota follows the ideals of green politics, which are based on the Four Pillars of the Green Party: Ecological wisdom, Social justice, Grassroots democracy and Nonviolence. The "Ten Key Values," which expand upon the four pillars, are as follows:

1. Grassroots democracy
2. Social justice
3. Ecological wisdom
4. Nonviolence
5. Decentralization
6. Community-based economics
7. Women's rights
8. Respect for diversity
9. Global responsibility
10. Future focus

The Green Party of Minnesota constitution Article XI Section 2 prohibits donations from corporations or political action committees (PACs). The party's platforms and rhetoric harshly criticize any corporate influence and control over government, media, and society at large.

== Leadership ==
The party is led by a 17-member coordinating committee which sets the party's long-range goals, budget, and strategy. These decisions are then implemented by an executive committee made of five party co-chairs, each of whom is responsible for one of five portfolios of party business (membership, political affairs, finances, communications, and internal organization). Each portfolio co-chair oversees a number of committees and party functions. While the coordinating and executive committees handle day-to-day operations of the state party, most organizing, activism, and decision-making is decentralized into a number of autonomous local party organizations (or "seedlings") located throughout the state.

== GPMN Coordination Committee ==
- Seth Kuhl-Stennes – Co-Chair
- Cam Gordon – Co-Chair
- Michelle Parker
- Samantha Pree-Stinson
- David Strand
- Adam Schneider
- Tom Dunnwald

== Electoral History ==
=== U.S. Senate ===
Class 1
| Year | Candidate | Votes | % | Won |
|---|---|---|---|---|
| 2000 | (Note: Did not contest) | | | |
| 2006 | Michael Cavlan | 10,714 | 0.5 | No |
| 2012 | | | | |
| 2018 | Paula Overby | 23,101 | 0.9 | No |
| 2024 | | | | |

Class 2
| Year | Candidate | Votes | % | Won |
|---|---|---|---|---|
| 2002 | Ray Tricomo | 10,119 | 0.5 | No |
| 2008 | | | | |
2014
2018 (sp)
2020
2026

=== Governor ===
Governor
| Year | Candidate | Votes | % | Won |
|---|---|---|---|---|
| 1998 | Ken Pentel | 7,034 | 0.3 | No |
| 2002 | Ken Pentel | 50,589 | 2.3 | No |
| 2006 | Ken Pentel | 10,800 | 0.5 | No |
| 2010 | Farheen Hakeem | 6,188 | 0.3 | No |
| 2014 | (Note: Did not contest) | | | |
| 2018 | (Note: Did not contest) | | | |
| 2022 | (Note: Did not contest) | | | |
| 2026 | Steve Young | 51,385 | 1.8 | No |

Secretary of State
| Year | Candidate | Votes | % | Won |
|---|---|---|---|---|
| 1998 | | | | |
| 2002 | Andrew S. Keobrick | 67,404 | 3.0 | No |
| 2006 | | | | |
| 2010 | | | | |
| 2014 | | | | |
| 2018 | | | | |
| 2022 | | | | |
| 2026 | Seth Kuhl-Stennes | | | |

Auditor
| Year | Candidate | Votes | % | Won |
|---|---|---|---|---|
| 1998 | | | | |
| 2002 | Dave Berger | 78,611 | 3.6 | No |
| 2006 | Dave Berger | 49,131 | 2.3 | No |
| 2010 | Annie Young | 54,154 | 2.6 | No |
| 2014 | | | | |
| 2018 | | | | |
| 2022 | | | | |
| 2026 | | | | |

Attorney General
| Year | Candidate | Votes | % | Won |
|---|---|---|---|---|
| 1998 | | | | |
| 2002 | | | | |
| 2006 | Papa John Kolstad | 41,000 | 1.9 | No |
| 2010 | | | | |
| 2014 | Andy Dawkins | 28,748 | 1.4 | No |
| 2018 | | | | |
| 2022 | | | | |
| 2026 | | | | |

== See also ==
- Politics of Minnesota
- List of political parties in Minnesota
