= Daniel Cohen =

Daniel, Dan, or Danny Cohen may refer to:

== Arts and media ==
- Dan Cohen (journalist) (born 1977), American author, journalist, and blogger
- Dan Baron Cohen (born 1957), playwright and community-theatre director
- Daniel Cohen (children's writer) (1936–2018), American writer
- Daniel Cohen (conductor) (born 1984), General Music Director Staatstheater Darmstadt
- Daniel Cohen (filmmaker), French actor, screenwriter and director of The Chef
- Daniel M. Cohen, American writer, producer, and director
- Danny Cohen (Australian filmmaker), director of feature documentary Anonymous Club, about musician Courtney Barnett
- Danny Cohen (cinematographer) (born 1963), British cinematographer
- Danny Cohen (television executive) (born 1974), Director of BBC Television

== Other people ==
- Dan Cohen (academic), American historian and the founding executive director of the Digital Public Library of America
- Dan Cohen (politician) (1936–2024), American author and independent politician
- Daniel Cohen, co-founder of the Center for the Study of Human Polymorphisms
- Daniel Cohen (economist) (1953–2023), French economist
- Daniel A. Cohen, Israeli accounting academic
- Daniel I. A. Cohen (born 1946), American mathematician and computer scientist
- Daniel Morris Cohen, American ichthyologist
- Danny Cohen (computer scientist) (1937–2019), Israeli-American computer scientist

== See also ==
- Cohen v. Cowles Media Co., for the Republican Dan Cohen

== See also ==
- Daniel Cohn-Bendit (born 1945), French-German politician
- Dan Cohn-Sherbok (born 1945), Reform rabbi
