= Gary Schiff =

American politician (born 1972)

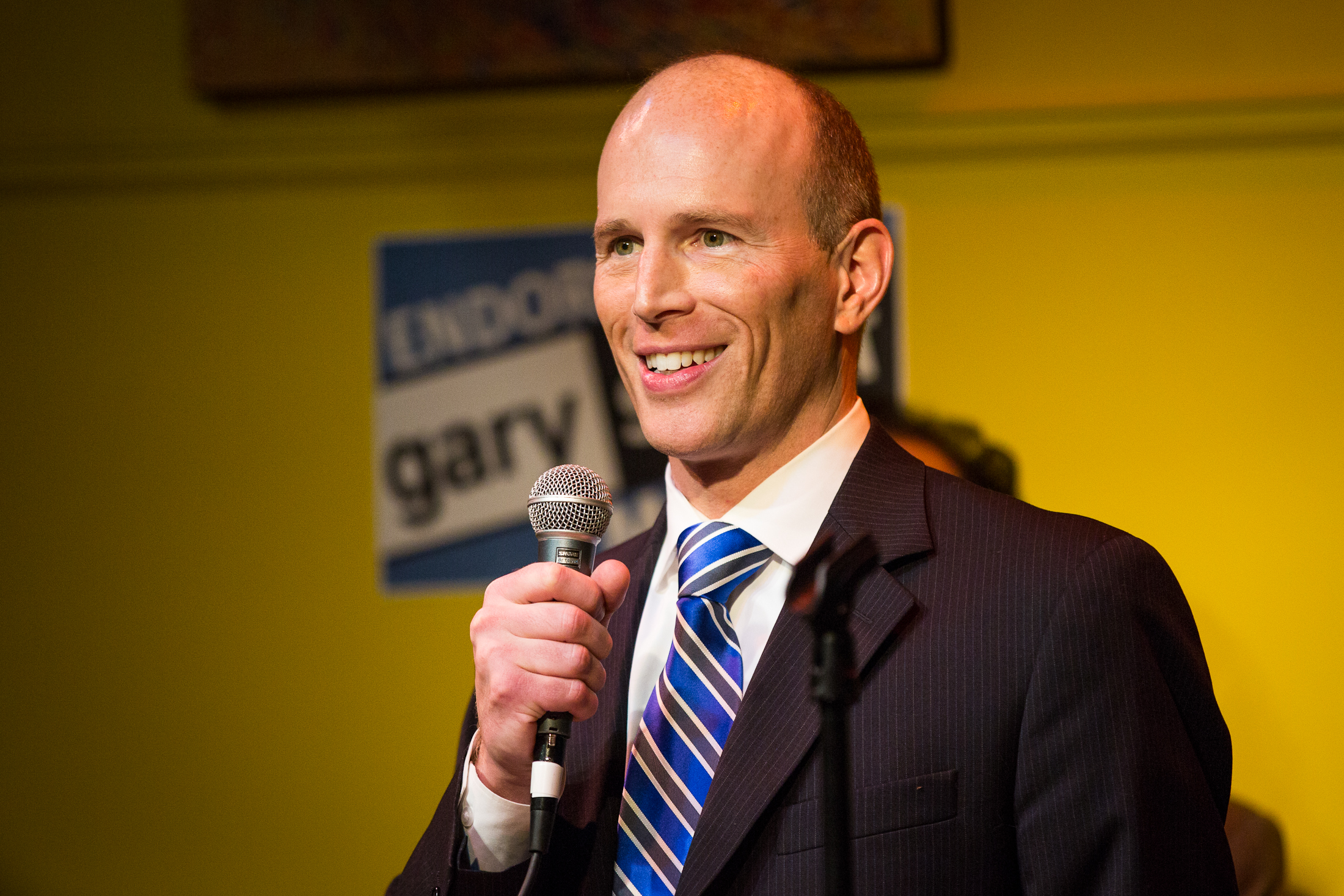
- Schiff announcing his candidacy for Minneapolis mayor in 2013

Member of the Minneapolis City Council from the 9th Ward
- In office December 17, 2001 – January 6, 2014
- Preceded by: Kathy Thurber
- Succeeded by: Alondra Cano

Personal details
- Born: Gary J. Schiffhauer; February 3, 1972 (age 54) Youngstown, New York
- Party: Democratic-Farmer-Labor
- Education: University of Minnesota (B.A.)
- Occupation: Activist

Gary Schiff (born February 3, 1972, as Gary J. Schiffhauer) is an American politician and activist who represented Ward 9 on the Minneapolis City Council. A member of the Minnesota Democratic-Farmer-Labor Party (DFL), he was first elected in 2001 and re-elected in 2005 and 2009. Prior to his political career, Schiff was involved with a variety of activist groups and causes ranging from human rights with the Human Rights Campaign, to historic preservation with Save Our Shubert.

During his city council tenure, Schiff worked to ease ordinances prohibitive to small businesses, especially microbreweries, and strongly advocated against a publicly funded stadium for the Minnesota Vikings. In January 2013, Schiff began a campaign for mayor of Minneapolis in the 2013 election but after an unsuccessful DFL endorsement convention, dropped out of the race and backed eventual winner Betsy Hodges in mid-June. His third and final term on the City Council ended in January 2014.

Schiff took over as president of the Council on Crime and Justice the following July but he was dismissed from the organization the next year. The organization closed abruptly following his termination. Schiff again ran to represent Ward 9 on the City Council in 2017 but lost to incumbent Alondra Cano.

== Early life ==
Schiff was born Gary J. Schiffhauer on February 3, 1972, and grew up the youngest of six children in Western New York State. In 1990, the American Civil Liberties Union represented Schiff after he graduated from Lewiston-Porter High School in his hometown of Youngstown, New York. According to The Buffalo News, Schiff had painted a mural along the school's stairwell that referenced "drugs, safe sex, AIDS and racism" in the style of artist Keith Haring. In September of that year, the school's superintendent, Walter S. Polka, decided that parts of the mural's text were objectionable. The American Civil Liberties Union became involved in an extended legal fight over the constitutionality of Polka's censorship, and a New York Supreme Court Justice sided with the Lewiston-Porter School Board. In 1991, the school board voted 5–1 to paint over the mural. The board cited Schiff's involvement in a recent ACT-UP demonstration at the school—where demonstrators gave condoms and safe sex literature to students—as a major influence on their decision.

As part of a transition that included moving from Youngstown to Minneapolis to attend college at the University of Minnesota, Schiff shortened his name from the original Schiffhauer as a result of his parents' shame and refusal to acknowledge his sexuality in the small conservative town of Youngstown NY where the family attended church in a conservative Roman Catholic Parish (St. Bernard's, Youngstown, NY). However, Robert and Rita Schiffhauer, Gary's parents, soon joined the PFLAG Chapter in nearby Buffalo, NY in order to understand and support their son which they continued to do throughout their lives. Schiff's official public statement is that he shortened his name in an effort to move the memories of bullying that he said made his youth "an act of survival". In October 1992, he and six other students protested against the Reserve Officers' Training Corps (ROTC) and its compliance with a longstanding ban on homosexuals in the military. The seven protesters interrupted a meeting of the University Board of Regents, demanded the expulsion of the ROTC from campus, and handcuffed themselves to the Regents' chairs. Wearing signs that read "$old," suggesting that their human rights had been traded for Federal grant money, Schiff and the six other students were arrested by University Police and each charged with misdemeanors.

From 1993 to 1995, Schiff directed the Progressive Student Leadership Exchange (PLSE), a program modeled on the Civil Rights Movement's Freedom Summer. The Human Rights Campaign (HRC) took interest in the program, and invited Schiff to direct it as the newly named "Youth College for Campaign Training" in Washington, D.C. The HRC-funded program invited people aged 18–24 to participate in workshops, and sent the participants to "target states" where they worked in groups as campaign staff members. The program was still in operation as late as 2006.

After graduating in 1994 with a B.A. in women's studies, Schiff moved to Washington, D.C. to work with the Human Rights Campaign. He returned to Minneapolis to work with Progressive Minnesota, "a grassroots group focused on community organizing and electoral politics." In December 1997, he became involved in a fight to save the Shubert Theater, a former vaudeville house on "Block E" in downtown Minneapolis, after the Minneapolis City Council approved a redevelopment plan that called for the theater's demolition. Within days, Schiff organized "Save Our Shubert," a grassroots effort to preserve the theater. After eight months, during which time Save our Shubert acted as a media contact, lobbied the city council, and "kept the Shubert in the public eye", the Minneapolis City Council voted 9–3 to move the theater to a space adjacent to the Hennepin Center for the Arts at a cost of $3.9 million.

== Minneapolis City Council ==
Schiff, at the time working as a teaching assistant in the University of Minnesota's Hubert H. Humphrey School of Public Affairs on his way to earning a master's degree in urban planning, took a leave of absence to run for a seat on the Minneapolis City Council against Michael Guest and Kathy Thurber in 2001. He won unanimous DFL endorsement on September 11, 2001, and, in a race that was overshadowed by the 2001 terrorist attacks, he ran against Lucky Rosenbloom, an African-American Republican. Schiff received the endorsement of the Star Tribune, which noted his "first-hand knowledge" of light rail systems in other U.S. cities. Elected by a large majority in November 2001, Schiff became one of seven newly elected members on the 13-member city council, joining two Green Party members, two other openly gay council members, one African-American council member, and four women. He was sworn into office on December 17, 2001, earlier than his fellow councilmembers, when Thurber resigned from her seat to assume the position of deputy director of Perpich Center for Arts Education.

=== First term (2001–05) ===
In his first term, Schiff sponsored and cosponsored numerous legal reforms to the Minneapolis Zoning Code that reduced bureaucratic obstacles for small businesses and housing developers, including a measure that permitted sidewalk cafes to use permanent outdoor furniture and a change in city zoning code that facilitated the construction of denser and more affordable housing. He also sponsored an ordinance to add domestic partnerships to the Zoning Code's definition of "family" in terms of housing.

In 2003, with colleagues Barbara Johnson and Sandy Colvin Roy, Schiff developed a last-minute plan to restore $2 million in proposed cuts to the Minneapolis Fire and Police Departments, following a $26 million cut from Local Government Aid by former Governor Tim Pawlenty. That same year, he sponsored an ordinance that effectively blocked police officers, city inspectors, and other city employees from inquiring about a resident's immigration status. The ordinance forbids police officers from arresting a suspect solely on the grounds of a suspected immigration status violation.

=== Second term (2005–09) ===
In July 2004, the Minneapolis City Council passed a ban on indoor smoking in bars, restaurants, pool halls, and bowling alleys by a 12-1 margin. In March 2005, the ban took effect alongside other indoor smoking bans passed by other cities in the Minneapolis-St. Paul metropolitan area. Subsequently, during the 2005 Minneapolis City Council elections, a write-in candidate named Dave Shegstad received 10 percent of the ninth ward vote under a "Smoke Out Gary" campaign slogan—a reference to Schiff's role as a co-author of the smoking ban. 59 percent of voters re-elected Schiff to a second term; his main opponent, Green Party candidate David Bicking, won 30 percent of the vote.

In 2006, Schiff sponsored eliminating a cap on taxi licenses in Minneapolis. The move angered some local taxi drivers, who noted that an attending increase in licenses would lead to greater competition in the local taxicab business. The City Council passed the cap lift, and the number of Minneapolis taxis doubled between 2010 and 2012.

Beginning in 2008, Schiff and other city leaders contended with local ramifications of the Great Recession, which included spate of foreclosures in economically distressed neighborhoods. In April 2008, the city council approved a pilot mortgage assistance program called Minneapolis Advantage. The program, which passed the council 10–2, offered forgivable loans to homebuyers who were interested in properties on the same block as foreclosed or city-owned properties within targeted neighborhoods. Schiff argued that the initiative was not targeted enough to have the designed effect and voted against it, along with fellow councilmember Paul Ostrow.

The city also strictly regulated non-motorized pedicabs; it first permitted the bicycle-powered taxis in 1984, but there were no active pedicab licenses in the city by 2008. Schiff proposed eliminating some restrictions, and the city council passed ordinances allowing pedicabs to operate on downtown streets, downtown bridges, and on the Nicollet Mall, at any time except the morning and evening rush hours. In October 2011, when the city permitted pedicabs to operate during rush hours (with new safety regulations), eight licensed pedicab companies operated forty cabs in the downtown area.

=== Third term (2009–13) ===
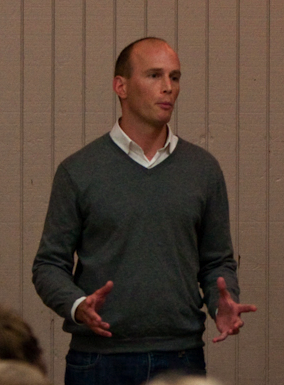
Gary Schiff speaking at a Ward 9 candidate forum in 2009

In February 2012, a reporter for the Minnesota Daily wrote that Schiff is "possibly the most active and popular City Council member" and noted that 60 percent of Ward 9 voters reelected him to a third term in 2009.

An avid supporter of microbrewing in Minneapolis, Schiff sponsored the "Brew Beer Here" ordinance that allowed the sale of 64-ounce "growlers" of beer on Minneapolis brewery premises. Passed in August 2010, the ordinance facilitated brewery operation within Minneapolis city limits and led to the opening of Harriet Brewing Company, the first Minneapolis brewery to open in decades. With colleague Elizabeth Gidden, Schiff co-sponsored the "Surly Bill," an ordinance that permits breweries to sell pints of their products on-site. Schiff also proposed eliminating zoning constraints against establishments serving alcohol within 300 feet of a house of worship outside of the downtown area. The ordinance change was inspired by a struggle between Rob Miller, a brewer interested in opening a "pico brewery" called Dangerous Man Brewing in Northeast Minneapolis, and the church of Saints Cyril and Methodius Church, located across the street from the brewery's proposed location. Citing his work to ease ordinances prohibitive to the microbrewing industry, Twin Cities Business named Schiff the most business-friendly city council member in Minneapolis in 2012.

In 1997, before he became a member of the city council, Schiff co-authored an amendment to the City of Minneapolis Charter that mandated a voter referendum on city stadium subsidies that cost taxpayers over $10 million. As of 2009, the Minnesota Vikings were moving forward on a $870 million plan to rebuild a downtown stadium on the site of the Hubert H. Humphrey Metrodome. The team also considered building a new stadium in other cities, including Anoka, Minnesota and Los Angeles, California. Though supportive of the Vikings remaining in Minneapolis in 2012, Schiff became an outspoken critic of the financing plan for the stadium when it came to a vote before the Minneapolis City Council, in part because it bypassed the charter amendment. Schiff also argued that the plan's estimated cost to Minneapolis taxpayers, cited at $150 million in construction costs, failed to account for interest, maintenance costs, and upgrades over the course of the stadium's expected 30-year lifespan. In a Star Tribune editorial, Schiff quoted figures presented by the city's chief financial officer, Kevin Carpenter, which estimated a cumulative, 30-year cost that could range from $675 million to $890 million. Despite Schiff's objections, the Minneapolis City Council approved the stadium financing 7–6. Subsequently, the football team moved forward with plans to demolish the Metrodome and rebuild a new stadium on the site, and Governor Mark Dayton signed a financing plan approved by the legislature.

== Mayoral bid (2013) ==
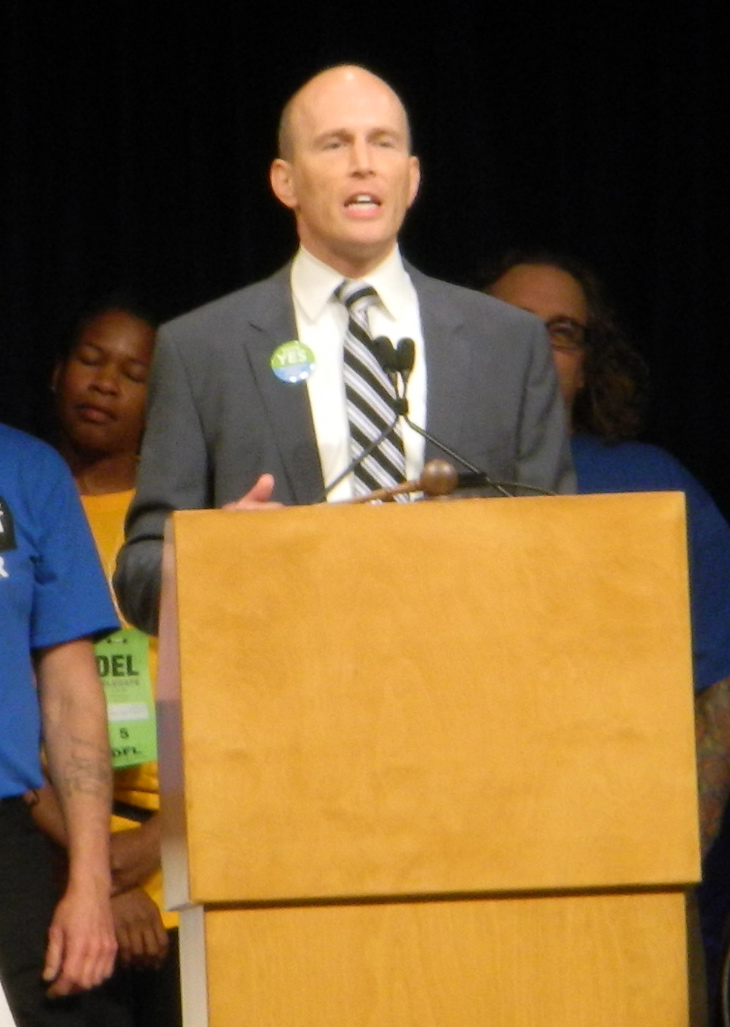
Schiff addressing the ill-fated DFL endorsement convention on June 15, 2013

Schiff had been considering running for mayor of Minneapolis in the 2013 Minneapolis mayoral election as early as June 2012, and stated that his ultimate decision would not be contingent upon whether mayor R.T. Rybak opted to run for another term. Speaking from the Harriet Brewing tap room on January 29, 2013, Schiff announced his official candidacy for the position. On the same day, he also held an event in the Dinkytown area near the University of Minnesota with rapper Brother Ali to kick off his campaign. Schiff was the second City Councilmember to announce his candidacy after Betsy Hodges of Ward 13, and Don Samuels of Ward 5 announced his candidacy later.

The University of Minnesota's Hubert H. Humphrey School of Public Affairs hosted the first mayoral debate on March 27, with Schiff among the five declared candidates who were seeking the DFL nomination. A week later, on April 4, Schiff took part in the city's second mayoral debate, this time located at a Kingfield-neighborhood church. During the proceedings, he pledged that he would abide by the DFL's endorsement, making him the sole candidate to vow so among the five candidates seeking the endorsement at the time. Schiff also participated in the city's first mayoral debate dealing specifically with issues concerning Minneapolis's Somali population, an event that took place on May 31 and was hosted at a Somali restaurant on Lake Street. Schiff received endorsements from the Minneapolis Firefighters Union, state representative Karen Clark, and former Vikings punter Chris Kluwe, among others.

At the DFL endorsement convention, Schiff came in third place behind Mark Andrew and Hodges during the first two rounds of voting but was denied a place on the third round ballot after failing to meet a minimum vote threshold during round two. When Schiff backed Hodges with the intention, according to the Star Tribune, of preventing Andrew from receiving the 60% of votes needed to win the endorsement, he lost the support of the Minneapolis Firefighters Union. The convention concluded with no winner and, because no one was endorsed, Schiff stated that he would remain in the race. His campaign manager, Mark Warren, left Schiff's campaign shortly after the convention and a few days later, he declared an end to his bid for mayor and announced that he would campaign actively for Hodges.

=== Post-mayoral bid ===
Schiff did not run for reelection in the City Council elections in 2013. Activist and communications specialist Alondra Cano won his seat with over 47 percent of the vote and was sworn into office on January 6, 2014.

=== Council on Crime and Justice ===
On July 1, 2014, Schiff took over as president of the Council on Crime and Justice (CCJ), a Minneapolis nonprofit organization established in 1957 to "create a criminal justice system that is equitable and just." The CCJ dismissed Schiff in 2015 and closed suddenly in 2016 after almost 60 years of operation. A federal audit conducted on a grant program that was frozen while Schiff led the CCJ identified a misuse of funds at the organization. Schiff stated that he believed that the CCJ's board of directors and its previous leadership were responsible for the council's shutdown, although two consultants with the CCJ said they believed Schiff's inaction and unresponsiveness during his tenure with the organization led to the freezing of the grant, one of the organization's largest sources of revenue.

=== 2017 City Council candidacy ===
In January 2017, Schiff announced a bid for the Minneapolis's 9th Ward City Council seat held by Alondra Cano. In the election that November, Cano maintained her seat, with Schiff finishing second.

== Personal life ==
An avid cyclist, Schiff lives in the Corcoran neighborhood of South Minneapolis. He sits on the board of In the Heart of the Beast Puppet and Mask Theatre and has served as co-chair of the capital campaign of the Little Earth for United Tribes. Schiff is gay and does not eat gluten.

== Electoral history ==
2001 Minneapolis ninth ward city council election
Party	Candidate	Votes	%
Democratic (DFL)	Gary Schiff	5,704	81.84
Republican	Lucky Rosenbloom	1,229	17.63
Write-ins		37	0.53
Total votes		6,970	100

2005 Minneapolis ninth ward city council election
Party	Candidate	Votes	%
Democratic (DFL)	Gary Schiff	2,549	59.13
Green	Dave Bicking	1,315	30.50
Write-ins		447	10.37
Total votes		4,311	100

2009 Minneapolis ninth ward city council election
Party	Candidate	Votes	%
Democratic (DFL)	Gary Schiff	1,818 (Note: The 2009 election used ranked choice voting; the winner needed a majority (50%+1, disregarding fractions) of 1,498 or more votes, which Schiff clinched in the first round. No subsequent instant runoff rounds were required.)	60.70
Green	Dave Bicking	816	27.25
Independence	Todd J. Eberhardy	270	9.02
Democratic (DFL)	Khalif Jama	83	2.77
Write-ins		8	0.27
Total votes		2,995	100

2017 Minneapolis ninth ward city council election
Party	Candidate	% 1st Choice	Round 1	Round 2	% Final
Minnesota Democratic–Farmer–Labor Party	Alondra Cano (incumbent)	47.53	2,623	2,982	54.03
Minnesota Democratic–Farmer–Labor Party	Gary Schiff	29.43	1,624	1,934	35.04
Minnesota Democratic–Farmer–Labor Party	Mohamed Farah	19.64	1,084		
Republican Party of Minnesota	Ronald Peterson	3.03	167		
Write-in	N/A	0.38	21		
Exhausted ballots				603	10.93
Valid votes			5,519		
Threshold			2,760		
Undervotes			131		
Turnout (out of 13,111 registered voters)		43.09	5,650		
Source: Minneapolis Elections & Voter Services
