= Steven Jamar =

American legal scholar

Steven D. Jamar
- Born: Ishpeming, Michigan, U.S.

Academic background
- Education: B.A. history, Carleton College (1975); J.D., Hamline School of Law (1979); LL.M. international and comparative law, Georgetown University Law Center (1994)

Academic work
- Discipline: Law
- Institutions: Howard University School of Law
- Notable works: Constitutional Law: Power, Liberty, Equality (2017); The Cambridge Handbook of Intellectual Property and Social Justice (2024, co-editor)

Steven D. Jamar is an American legal scholar and professor emeritus at the Howard University School of Law. His teaching and scholarship span constitutional law, intellectual property, social justice, international human rights, and artificial intelligence. He is the co-founder and associate director of the Institute for Intellectual Property and Social Justice (IIPSJ), a non-governmental organization accredited by the World Intellectual Property Organization (WIPO).

== Early life and education ==
Jamar was born in Ishpeming, Michigan, and grew up in Hibbing, Minnesota, graduating from Hibbing High School in 1971. He studied history at Carleton College (B.A., 1975), focusing on South and Central Asia. He earned a Juris Doctor from Hamline School of Law in 1979 (now the Mitchell Hamline School of Law following its merger with William Mitchell School of Law). In 1994, he received a Master of Laws (LL.M.) in International and Comparative Law, with distinction, from Georgetown University Law Center.

== Academic and professional career ==
After graduating law school, Jamar clerked for Justice James C. Otis at the Minnesota Supreme Court (1979–80). He then joined the Minneapolis law firm Meagher, Geer, Markham, Anderson, Adamson, Flaskamp, and Brennan (now Meagher & Geer, PLLP), practicing primarily in appellate work and construction-related litigation.

In 1985, he transitioned into teaching, first at the William Mitchell School of Law as a clinical professor in the Civil Litigation Clinic and instructor in legal research and writing. He later taught Commercial Law at the University of Baltimore School of Law (1989).

Jamar joined Howard University School of Law in 1990, serving as Director of the Legal Reasoning, Research, and Writing Program until 2002. He advised the International Moot Court Team. Jamar retired from full-time teaching in 2021 and later continued part-time as professor emeritus.

== Institute for Intellectual Property and Social Justice ==
In 2002, Jamar co-founded the Institute for Intellectual Property and Social Justice (IIPSJ) with Lateef Mtima. As associate director for Scholarly Initiatives, he has developed research and advocacy connecting intellectual property and social justice. He co-edited The Cambridge Handbook of Intellectual Property and Social Justice with Mtima (Cambridge University Press, 2024).

== Research and publications ==
Jamar's scholarship covers constitutional law, comparative law, legal writing, intellectual property and emerging technologies, and intellectual property's relationship to social justice. His notable works include:

- "The Protection of Intellectual Property under Islamic Law," Capital University Law Review (1992).
- "The International Human Right to Health," Southern University Law Review (1994).
- "Aristotle Teaches Persuasion: The Psychic Connection," Scribes (2001).
- Constitutional Law: Power, Liberty, Equality (Aspen Publishing, 2017).
- "A Social Justice Perspective on IP Protection for Artificial Intelligence Programs," in The Cambridge Handbook of Intellectual Property and Social Justice (2024).

He has also contributed to works such as The Oxford Handbook of Music Law and Policy (2021) and is contributing to the forthcoming Research Handbook on IP and Social Justice (Oxford University Press, 2026).

== Other contributions ==
Jamar has participated in institutional initiatives. At Howard, he served on the Brown@50 Planning Committee, commemorating Brown v. Board of Education. He developed and authored the accompanying website. With the Law Library of Congress, he contributed to the Global Legal Information Network, developing XML standards and moderating international discussions on access to legal information.

== Selected publications ==
- Jamar, Steven D. (1992). "The Protection of Intellectual Property under Islamic Law." Capital University Law Review. 21: 1079–1106.
- Jamar, Steven D. (1994). "The International Human Right to Health." Southern University Law Review. 22: 1–68.
- Jamar, Steven D. (1996). "Accommodating Religion at Work: A Principled Approach to Title VII and Religious Freedom." New York Law School Law Review. 40: 719–832.
- Jamar, Steven D. (2001). "Aristotle Teaches Persuasion: The Psychic Connection." Scribes. 2001–02: 61–102.
- Jamar, Steven D. (2010). "Crafting Copyright Law to Encourage and Protect User-Generated Content in the Internet Social Networking Context." Widener Law Journal. 19: 843–868.
- Jamar, Steven D. (2017). Constitutional Law: Power, Liberty, Equality. Aspen Publishing.
- Jamar, Steven D. (2017). "A Lawyering Approach to Law and Development." North Carolina Journal of International Law. 27(1): 1–55.
- Jamar, Steven D.; Mtima, Lateef (eds.) (2024). The Cambridge Handbook of Intellectual Property and Social Justice. Cambridge University Press. ISBN 978-1-108-84385-0.
- Jamar, Steven D.; Mtima, Lateef (2021). "A Social Justice Perspective on Intellectual Property Protection for Folk Music." In Sean O’Connor (ed.), The Oxford Handbook of Music Law and Policy. Oxford University Press.
- Jamar, Steven D.; Mtima, Lateef (forthcoming, 2026). "IP Social Justice Theory in the International Human Rights Context." In Research Handbook on IP and Social Justice. Oxford University Press.
