= Alondra Cano =

American politician and activist

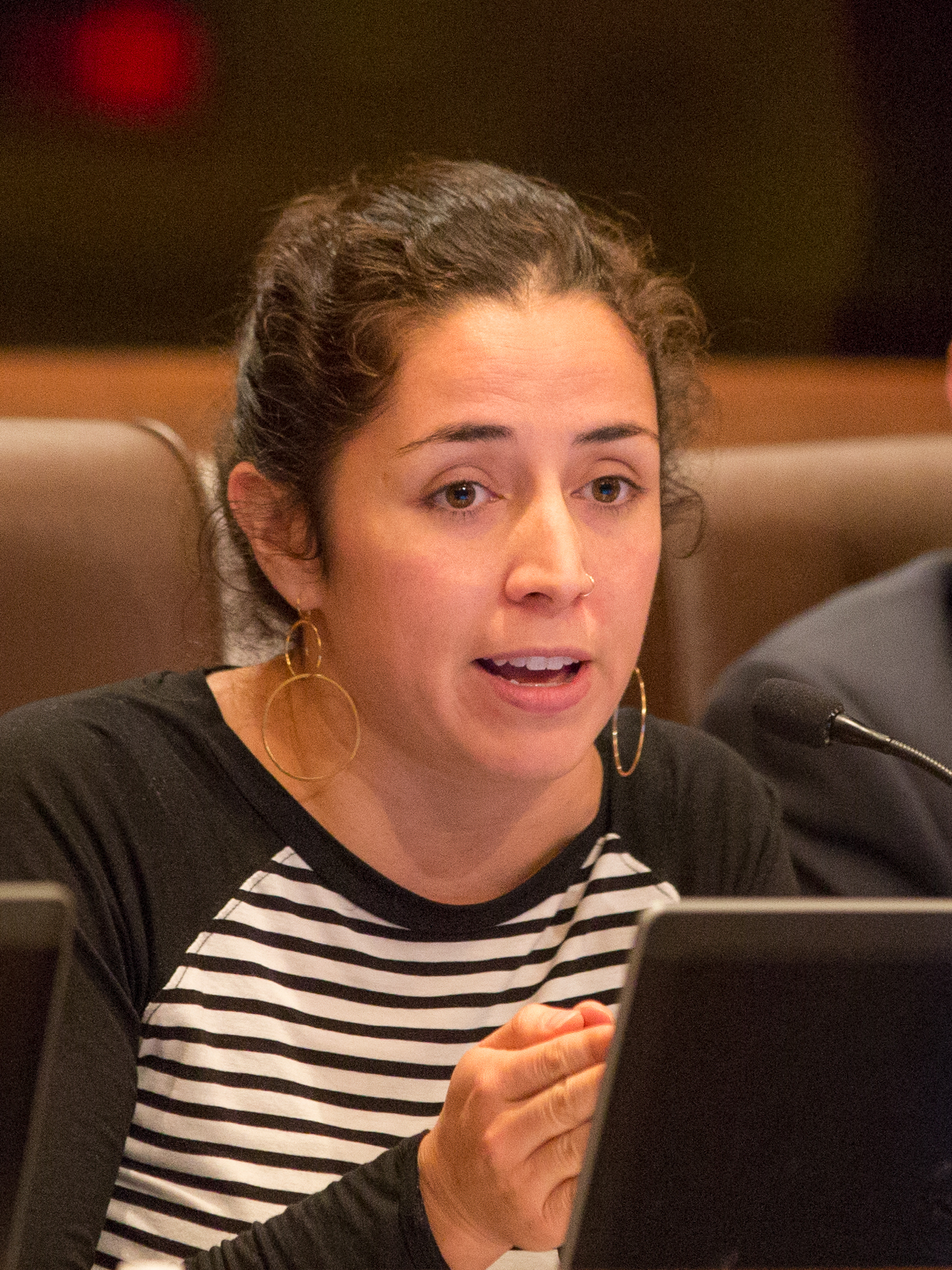

Member of the Minneapolis City Council from the 9th ward
- In office January 6, 2014 – January 3, 2022
- Preceded by: Gary Schiff
- Succeeded by: Jason Chavez

Personal details
- Born: September 26, 1981 (age 44) Cokato, Minnesota
- Party: Democratic
- Education: University of Minnesota (BA)

Alondra Cano Espejel (born September 26, 1981) is an American politician, activist, and former member of the Minneapolis City Council from the 9th Ward.

== Early life and education ==
Cano was born in Cokato, Minnesota and raised in Chihuahua, Mexico before moving to Litchfield, Minnesota at the age of 10. She earned a Bachelor of Arts degree from the University of Minnesota, where she studied management, Chicano studies, popular education, and the politics of identity. She also began working as an activist.

== Career ==
As a college student, Cano worked with the Minnesota Immigrant Freedom Network’s board. Cano also worked with Rose Brewer, a professor and activist, to organize events against police brutality. Cano worked as a communication and public relations assistant for eleven months for Minneapolis Public Schools and worked on the staff of Councilmember Robert Lilligren. Cano ran to represent Minneapolis's 9th ward in the Minneapolis City Council in 2013 against Ty Moore to replace retiring incumbent Gary Schiff. She won and was sworn in on January 6, 2014. She is a member of the Minnesota Democratic–Farmer–Labor Party.

On December 19, 2020, Cano announced that she would not seek re-election to the city council in 2021.

In October 2025, she was arrested and jailed for allegedly driving under the influence of alcohol after crashing into a parked car next to Minneapolis City Hall.
