= Lateef Mtima =

American legal scholar

- Born: Harlem, New York City, U.S.
- Education: Amherst College (BA); Harvard Law School (JD)
- Occupation: Professor of Law
- Employer: Howard University School of Law
- Known for: Intellectual property law and social justice Founder and Director of the Institute for Intellectual Property and Social Justice

Lateef Mtima is an American legal scholar and professor specializing in intellectual property law and social justice. He is a professor of law at the Howard University School of Law and the founder and director of the Institute for Intellectual Property and Social Justice (IIPSJ), a non-governmental organization accredited by the World Intellectual Property Organization (WIPO).

== Early life and education ==
Mtima was born in Harlem, New York City, the son of immigrants from the Caribbean islands of Antigua and Montserrat. He graduated from Stuyvesant High School and from Amherst College with honors before earning his Juris Doctor from Harvard Law School. While at Harvard, he co-founded and later served as editor-in-chief of the Harvard BlackLetter Journal, now known as the Harvard Journal on Racial and Ethnic Justice.

== Academic and legal career ==
Mtima is admitted to the bars of New York and Pennsylvania and began his career in private legal practice. For more than a decade, he worked with the former international law firm Coudert Brothers, where he practiced intellectual property, bankruptcy, and commercial law.

He joined the Howard University School of Law faculty in 1998, where he co-founded the Howard Intellectual Property Program (HIPP) with Steven Jamar.

== Professional service and affiliations ==
In 2023 Mtima was appointed by U.S. Secretary of Commerce Gina Raimondo to the Patent Public Advisory Council for the United States Patent and Trademark Office (USPTO). He has also been a member of the Advisory Council for the United States Court of Federal Claims and served as president of the Giles S. Rich Inn of Court for the United States Court of Appeals for the Federal Circuit.

He currently serves on the Copyright Alliance Advisory Board, the USPTO Patent Pro Bono Advisory Council, and the UIC John Marshall Center for IP, Information & Privacy Law Advisory Board.

== Legislative advocacy ==
Mtima has testified before the United States Congress in support of intellectual property social justice legislation, including the Unleashing American Innovators Act, signed into law by President Joe Biden on December 29, 2022.

== Institute for Intellectual Property and Social Justice ==
In 2002, Mtima founded, with co-founder Steven D. Jamar, the Institute for Intellectual Property and Social Justice (IIPSJ), a 501(c)(3) non-profit NGO. As director, Mtima has developed programs to promote public education and professional engagement in equitable intellectual property practice and policy, as well as diversification of the IP legal bar.

IIPSJ has hosted the annual Intellectual Property and Social Justice Continuing Legal Education Conference for more than 20 years and organizes initiatives such as IP for the People, a monthly online public education series for creatives and communities, and the IP Mosaic Conference on Social Justice IP Scholarship.

== Research and scholarship ==
Mtima is co-editor (with Steven D. Jamar) of The Cambridge Handbook of Intellectual Property Social Justice (Cambridge University Press, 2024) and co-author of Transnational Intellectual Property Law (West Academic, 2nd ed., 2022). He is editor of Intellectual Property, Social Justice, and Entrepreneurship: From Swords to Ploughshares (Edward Elgar, 2015).

His writings have appeared in journals including the Gonzaga Law Review, Houston Law Review, University of Pittsburgh Law Review, the Fordham Intellectual Property, Media & Entertainment Law Journal, and the Harvard Journal of Law and Technology.

=== Selected publications ===
- Steven D. Jamar and Lateef Mtima, eds. The Cambridge Handbook of Intellectual Property Social Justice. Cambridge University Press, 2024.
- Xuan-Thao Nguyen, Danielle Conway, Lateef Mtima, Wilajeanne McLean, and Emily Michiko Morris. Transnational Intellectual Property Law. 2nd ed., West Academic Publishing, 2022.
- Lateef Mtima, ed. Intellectual Property, Social Justice, and Entrepreneurship: From Swords to Ploughshares. Edward Elgar Publishing, 2015.
- Mtima, Lateef. "Copyright Social Justice in Service of Art: Lessons from Andy Warhol Foundation for the Visual Arts, Inc. v. Goldsmith." Harvard Journal of Law and Technology, vol. 38, no. 3, 2024, pp. 697–734.
- Mtima, Lateef. "The Idea Exclusions in Intellectual Property Law." Texas Intellectual Property Law Journal, vol. 28, no. 3, 2020, pp. 343–392.
- Mtima, Lateef. "IP Social Justice Theory: Access, Inclusion, and Empowerment Through IP Protection." Gonzaga Law Review, vol. 54, no. 3, 2019, pp. 355–388.
- Mtima, Lateef. "Copyright and Social Justice in the Digital Information Society." Houston Law Review, vol. 52, 2015, pp. 459–492.
- O’Connor, Sean; Lateef Mtima; and Lita Rosario. "Overdue legal recognition for African-American artists in ‘Blurred Lines’ copyright case." The Seattle Times, March 2015.
