= Richard Senese =

American psychologist and academic administrator

President of Capella University
- Incumbent
- Assumed office November 2016

State Chair of the Minnesota Democratic–Farmer–Labor Party
- In office 1997–1999
- Preceded by: Mark Andrew
- Succeeded by: Mike Erlandson

Personal details
- Education: University of Minnesota

Richard Paul Senese is an American psychologist, academic administrator, and former politician serving as the president of Capella University since 2016. He was chair of the Minnesota Democratic–Farmer–Labor Party from 1997 to 1999.

== Life ==
Senese is from Iron Range Township, Itasca County, Minnesota. He completed a Ph.D. in the counseling and student personnel psychology program at the University of Minnesota. His November 1997 dissertation was titled, An analogue approach to understanding the impact of spontaneous metaphors. John L. Romano was his advisor.

Senese was a campaign and staff aid to U.S. senator Paul Wellstone. He worked as a psychology instructor at St. Olaf College. In 1997, Senese succeeded Mark Andrew as chair of the Minnesota Democratic–Farmer–Labor Party. In March 1999, he announced that he would not seek reelection.

Senese was a faculty member at Metropolitan State University and College of St. Scholastica. For 13 years, he worked in administration at the University of Minnesota Extension as its founding associate dean for the center for community vitality and later the Extension's senior associate dean. He was the associate dean of the Capella University's Harold Abel School of Psychology. In 2014, he became Capella University's vice president of academic affairs and chief academic officer. In 2016, he served as interim president for ten months. He was named president in November 2016.

Senese is gay and an advocate for the LGBTQ community.

Party political offices
Preceded by Mark Andrew	Democratic–Farmer–Labor Party State Chair; 1997-1999	Succeeded by Mike Erlandson
