= 2013 Minneapolis mayoral election =

- November 5, 2013
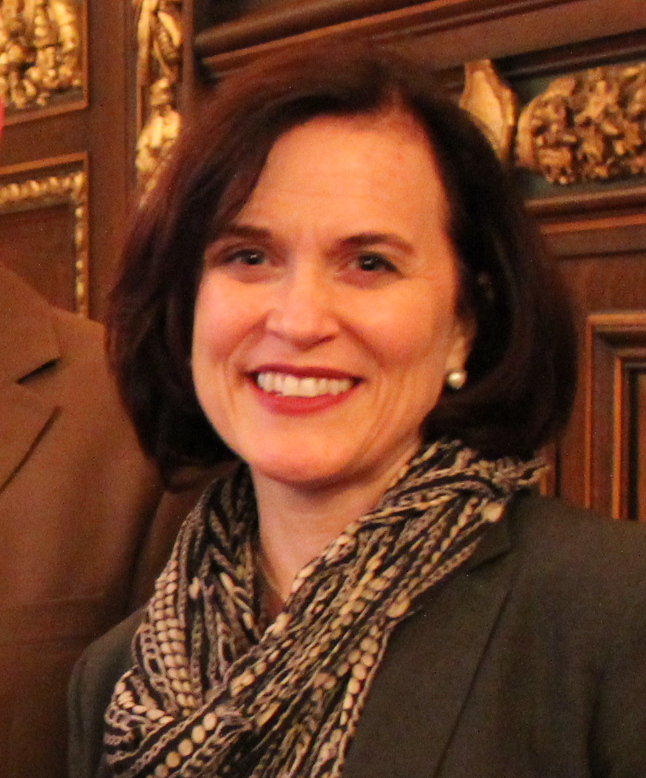

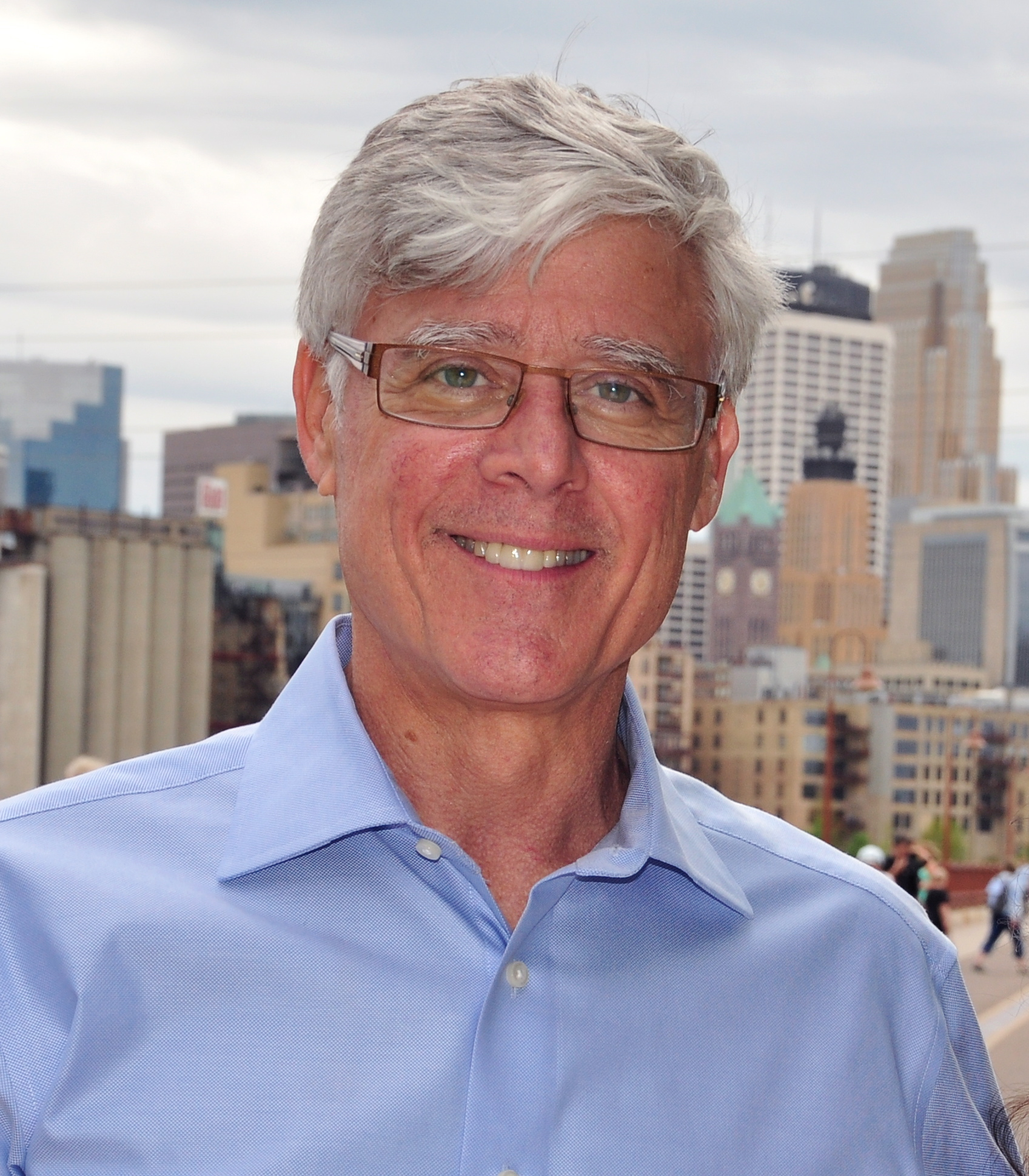

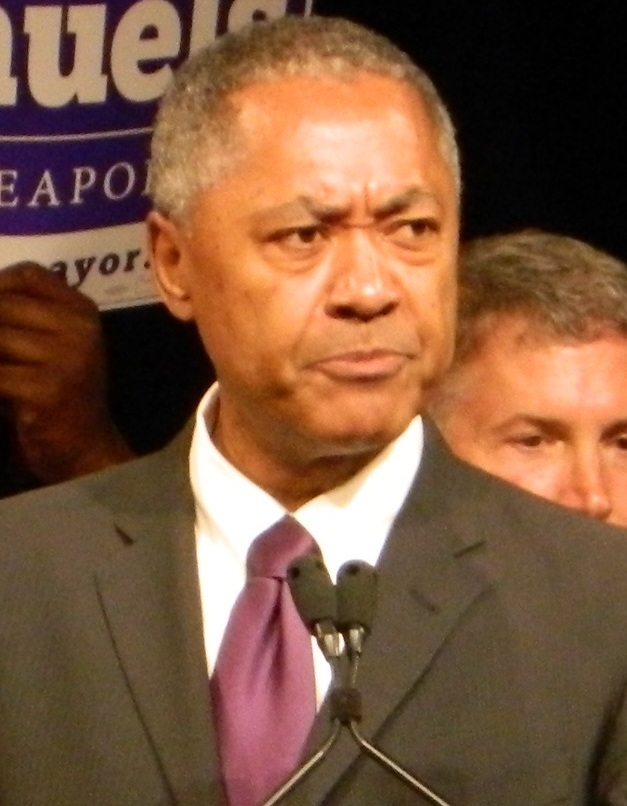

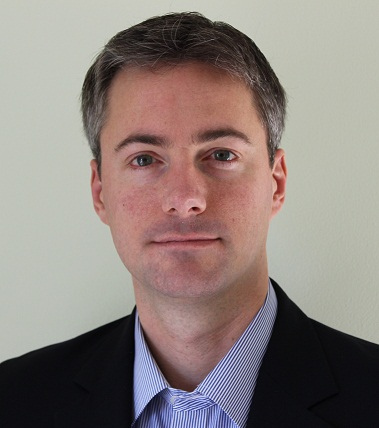
Candidate	Betsy Hodges	Mark Andrew
Party	Democratic (DFL)	Democratic (DFL)
First round	28,962; 36.47%	19,648; 24.74%
Final round	38,870; 48.95%	24,972; 31.44%
Candidate	Don Samuels	Cam Winton
Party	Democratic (DFL)	Independent
First round	8,350; 10.51%	7,533; 9.49%
Final round	10,301; 12.97%	8,969; 11.23%
- First preference votes by precinct Hodges: 20-30% 30–40% 40-50% 50-60% Andrew: 10-20% 20-30% 30-40% 40-50% 50-60% 80-90% Samuels: 20-30% 30-40% Cherryhomes: 20-30% 30-40% Savior: 20-30%
Mayor before election
R. T. Rybak
Democratic (DFL)
Elected Mayor
Betsy Hodges
Democratic (DFL)

The 2013 Minneapolis mayoral election was held on November 5, 2013, to elect the mayor of Minneapolis for a four-year term. This was the second mayoral election in the city's history to use instant-runoff voting, popularly known as ranked choice voting, first implemented in the city's 2009 elections. Municipal elections in Minnesota are nonpartisan, although candidates are able to identify with a political party on the ballot. After incumbent Mayor R. T. Rybak announced in late 2012 that he would not seek a fourth term, 35 candidates began campaigns to replace him. Many of these candidates sought the endorsement of the Minneapolis unit of the Minnesota Democratic–Farmer–Labor Party (DFL), though the convention ultimately ended with no endorsement.

Although she did not win enough votes to be victorious on the first ballot, DFLer Betsy Hodges held a "commanding" lead and was "poised" to be elected following completion of vote tabulations. Second-place finisher Mark Andrew effectively conceded on election night, saying that it was unlikely that he would overcome Hodges' lead. Hodges was elected in the 33rd round after two days of vote tabulations.

== Background ==
Minneapolis' 2009 elections were the first in the city's history to implement a system of ranked choice voting (RCV), whereby voters ranked up to their first three choices for an office instead of voting for just one. Turnout that year was, however, the city's lowest in decades with under 46,000 ballots being cast. Incumbent mayor R.T. Rybak won over 33,000 of those votes on the first round of voting, surpassing 22,579 which was the threshold of 50% of ballots cast plus one that were necessary to win the election. A 2010 report prepared for the Minneapolis Elections Department by David Schultz and Kristi Rendahl of Hamline University determined that it was unclear whether the RCV system had met its stated goals of "increasing voter turnout, encouraging more candidates to run, [and] promoting more support for third party candidates."

On December 27, 2012, Rybak, who had been in office since 2001, announced that he would not seek a fourth term as mayor.

== Candidates ==
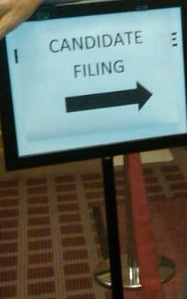
A sign pointing to candidate filing

The official filing period with the City of Minneapolis for mayoral candidacy began on July 30 and lasted for two weeks, until August 13. Candidates had until August 15 to withdraw and have their names taken off of the ballot. In March 2013, City Council member Cam Gordon proposed raising the fee to run for mayor to $500, a move intended to "discourag[e] frivolous candidates" according to the Star Tribune. However, the fee remained at $20 for the 2013 filing period. While the election is officially nonpartisan, there was a space on the affidavits of candidacy for candidates to declare their "Political Party or Principle".

A total of 35 people declared their candidacy for mayor, a number that Minneapolis elections officials claimed had not been seen on the ballot since at least the 1980s, if not before. Hamline University's Schultz commented that the crowded race would make it difficult for candidates to get name recognition, "[e]specially for some of those candidates who fall further down on the list because they probably don't have a lot of money, and they probably aren't going to get invited to debates." An article in MinnPost suggested that the majority of candidates' campaigns would not have a lot of funding with which to work, nor would they be well organized.

Gregg A. Iverson was the first of six candidates to submit their affidavits of candidacy on July 30, the first day of filing. Meanwhile, three candidates waited until August 13, the final day of the filing period, to submit their affidavits, including Cyd Gorman who was the last to file. No candidates who registered with the Elections Department took advantage of the ability to withdraw their candidacies.

In 2014, as a result of the high number of candidates, city voters approved an amendment to the city charter that raised filing requirements to either $500 or 500 signatures.

=== Declared ===
A candidate's self-identified political party does not indicate endorsement by that party. Political party endorsements are listed in the "Political party endorsements" section below.

- Mark V. Anderson, Simplify Government
- Merrill Anderson, Jobs & Justice
- Mark Andrew, DFL (Note: Five DFLers: Mark Andrew, Jackie Cherryhomes, Betsy Hodges, Don Samuels, Gary Schiff and Cam Winton (an Independent {i.e.: Republican}) were featured in the Star Tribune article: "Minneapolis Mayoral Hopefuls".) (Note: Eight candidates were mentioned in Curtis Gilbert's August 13th 2013 report for MPR News, "35 candidates queue up in Minneapolis mayor's race": "...Don Samuels and Betsy Hodges, former council members Jackie Cherryhomes and Dan Cohen, former Hennepin County commissioner Mark Andrew, Park Board Commissioner Bob Fine, business executive Stephanie Woodruff and attorney Cam Winton. ...")
- Neal Baxter, Independent
- Troy Benjegerdes, Local Energy/Food
- Alicia K. Bennett, DFL
- Edmund Bernard Bruyere, Legacy-Next Generation
- Bob "Again" Carney Jr., Demand Transit Revolution
- Jackie Cherryhomes, DFL
- Christopher Clark, Libertarian Party of Minnesota
- Dan Cohen, Jobs Downtown Casino
- James Everett, Green Party of Minnesota
- Bob Fine, DFL
- Cyd Gorman, Police Reform
- Mike Gould, DFL
- Kurtis W. Hanna, Minnesota Pirate Party
- John Leslie Hartwig, Independent
- Betsy Hodges, DFL
- Gregg A. Iverson, DFL
- Bill Kahn, Last Minneapolis Mayor
- Jaymie Kelly, Stop Foreclosures Now
- Tony Lane, Socialist Workers Party
- Doug Mann, Green Party of Minnesota
- Abdul M. Rahaman "The Rock", We the people...
- Joshua Rea, End Homelessness Now
- Don Samuels, DFL
- Ole Savior, Republican Party of Minnesota
- Captain Jack Sparrow, Count All Rankings
- James "Jimmy" L. Stroud Jr., The people's choice
- Jeffrey Alan Wagner, DFL
- John Charles Wilson, Lauraist Communist
- Cam Winton, independent responsible inclusive
- Stephanie Woodruff, DFL
- Rahn V. Workcuff, Independence Party of Minnesota
- Christopher Robin Zimmerman, Libertarian

==== Political party endorsements ====
Party		Candidate	Source
Fifth Congressional District Independence Party of Minnesota	First choice	Stephanie Woodruff	
Fifth Congressional District Independence Party of Minnesota	Second choice	Don Samuels	
Fifth Congressional District Independence Party of Minnesota	Third choice	Cam Winton	
Libertarian Party of Minnesota	First choice	Christopher Clark	
Libertarian Party of Minnesota	Second choice	Kurtis W. Hanna	
Libertarian Party of Minnesota	Third choice	Cam Winton	
Minnesota Pirate Party		Kurtis W. Hanna	
Minneapolis City Republican Committee		Cam Winton	(Note: A "recommendation." Not an official endorsement.)

==== Gallery ====
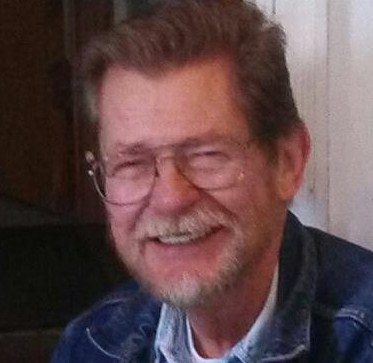
Merrill Anderson

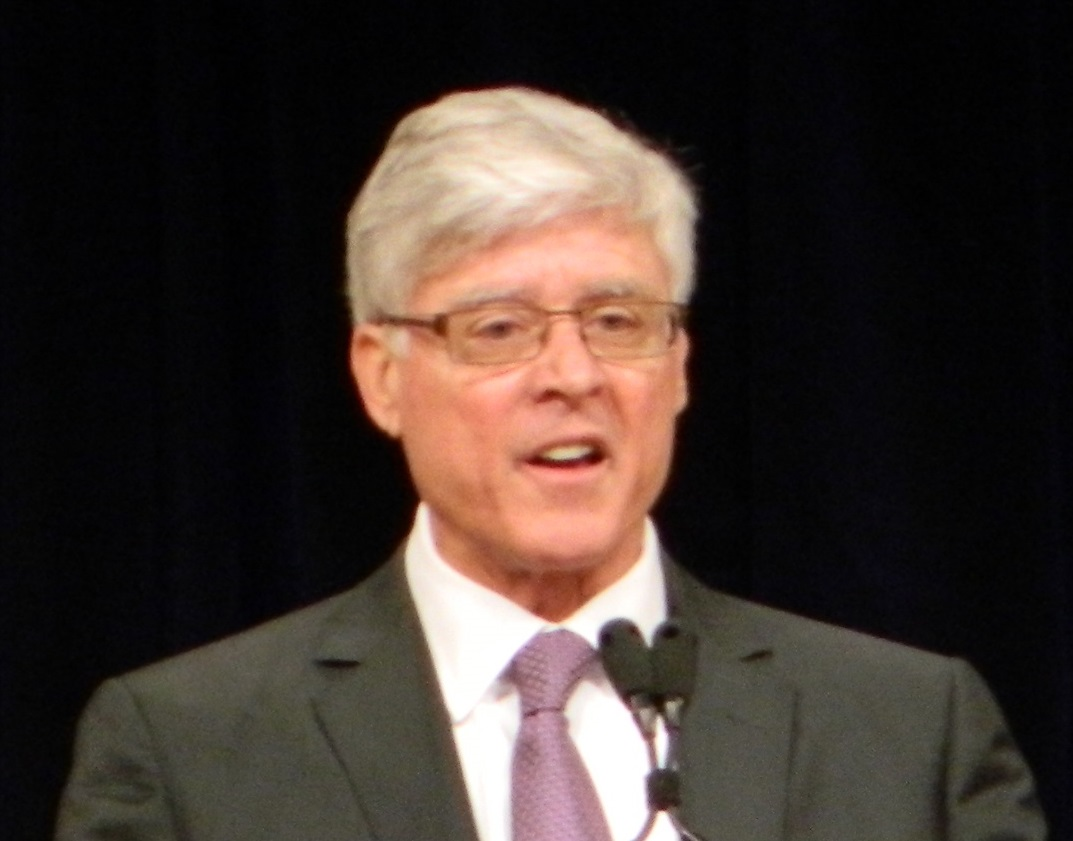
Mark Andrew

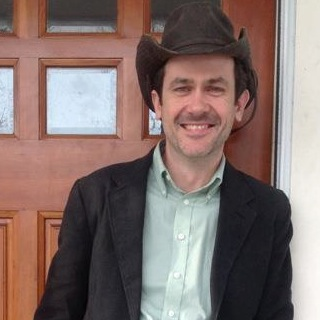
Troy Benjegerdes

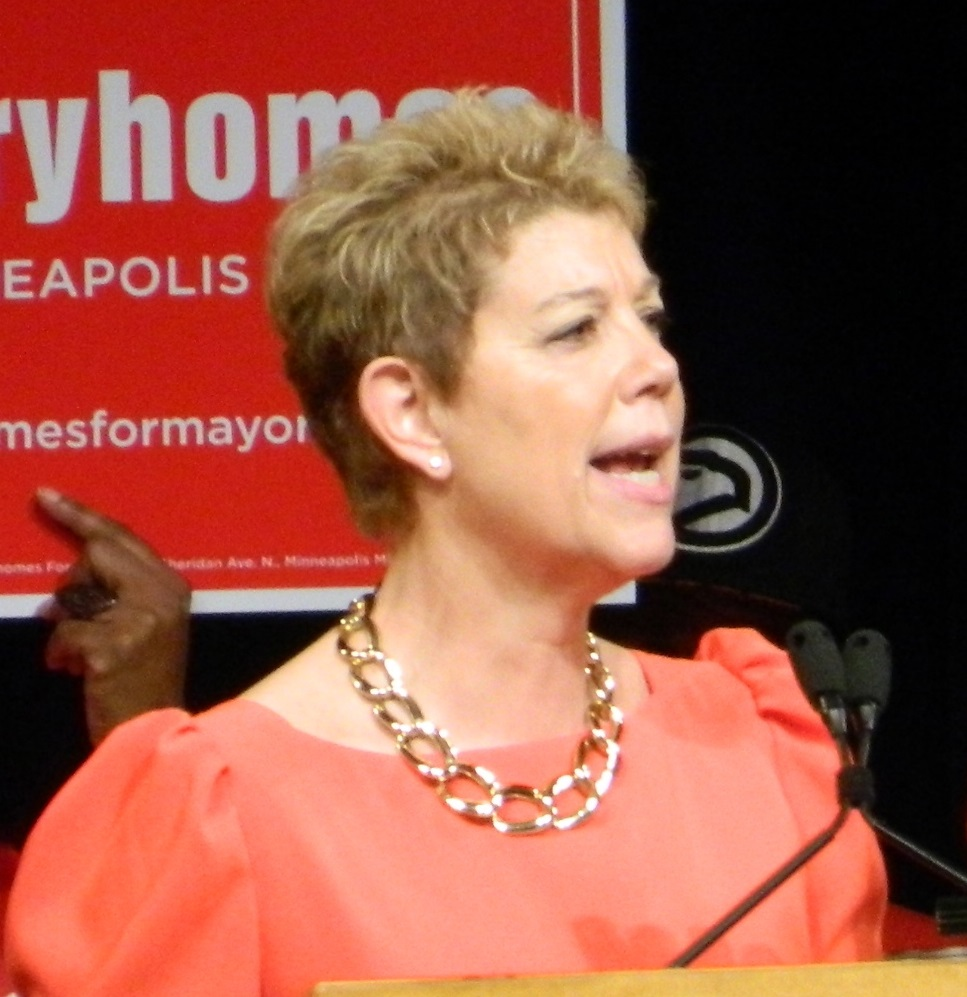
Jackie Cherryhomes

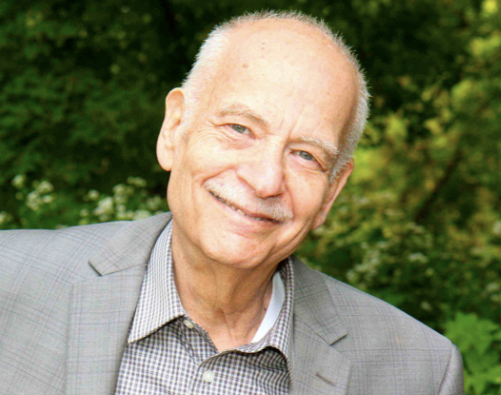
Dan Cohen

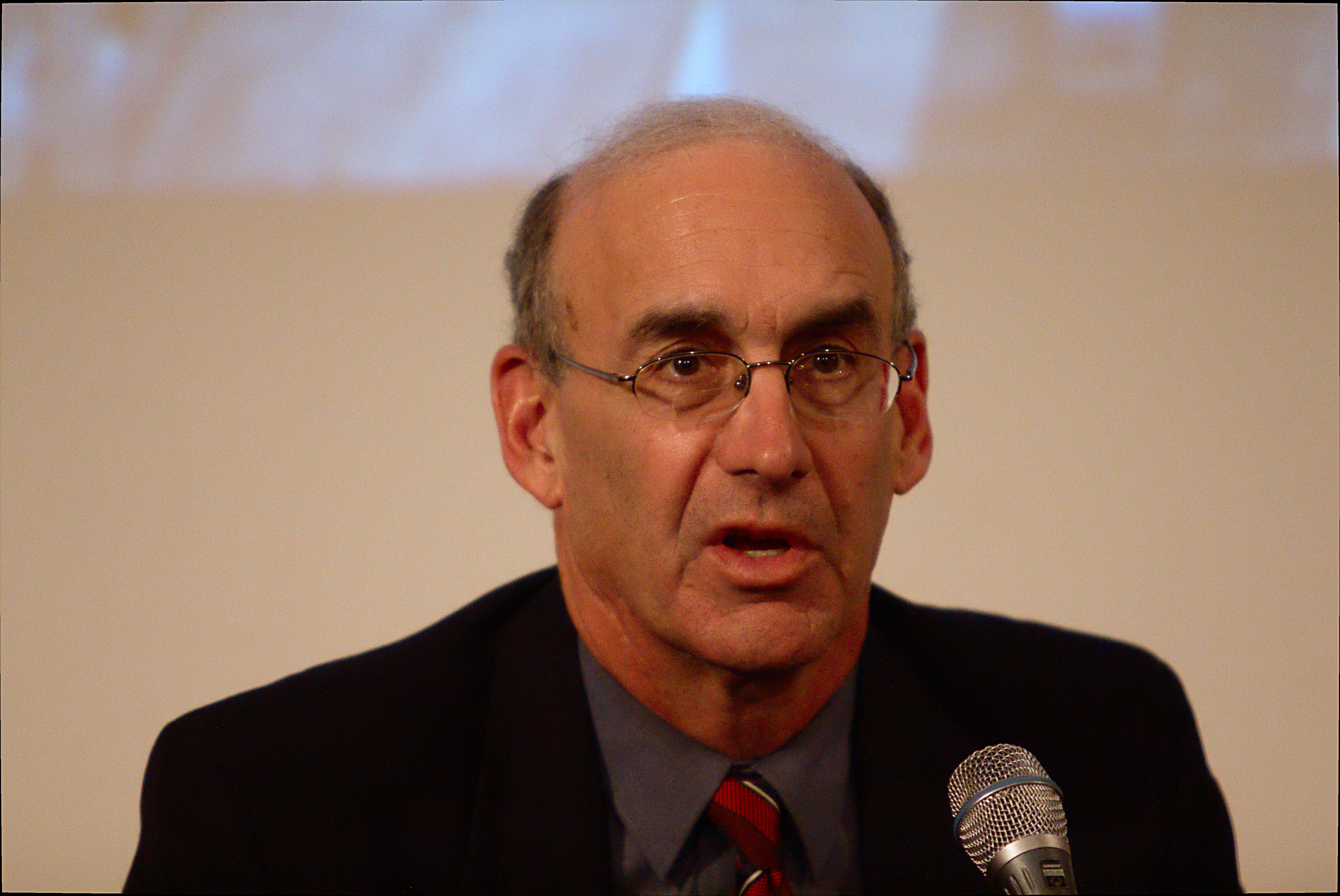
Bob Fine

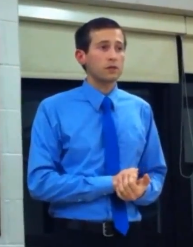
Kurtis W. Hanna

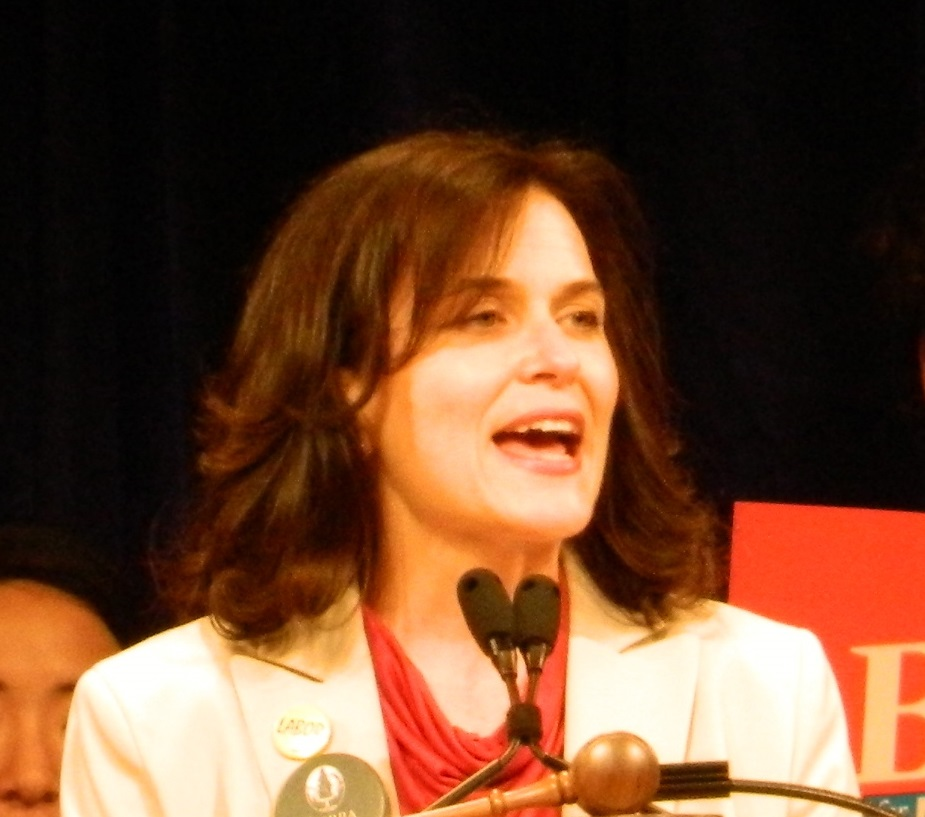
Betsy Hodges

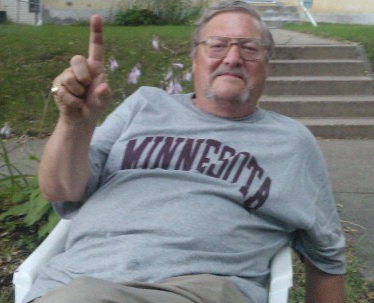
Gregg A. Iverson

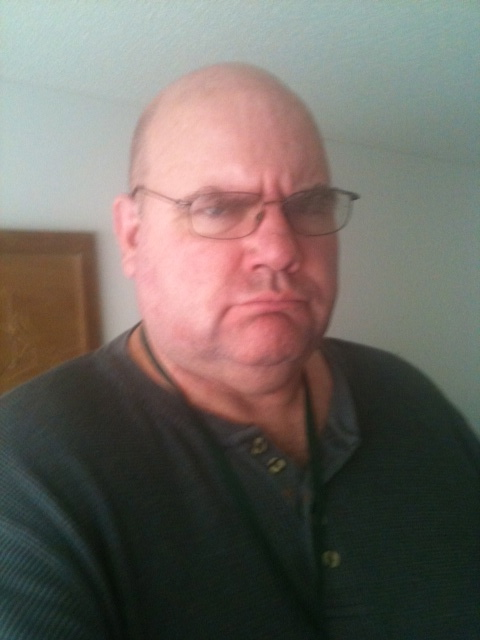
Bill Kahn

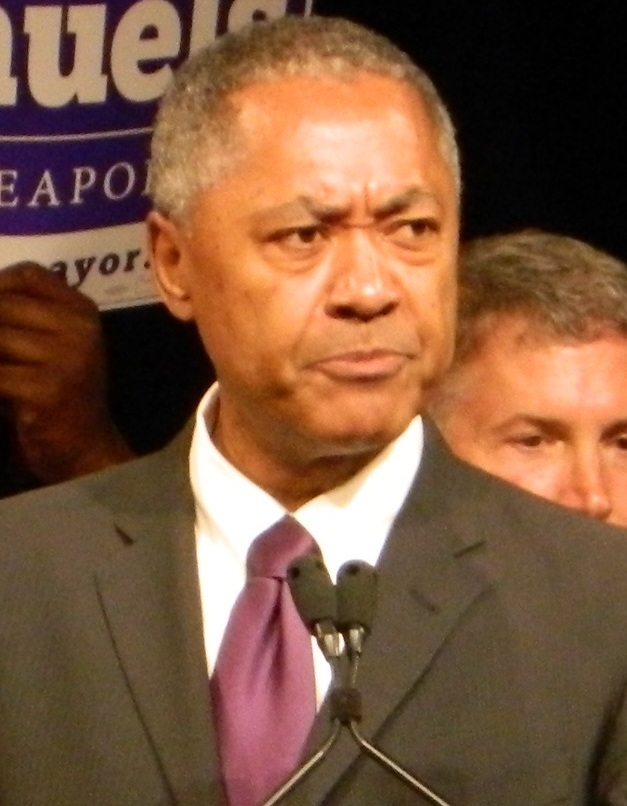
Don Samuels

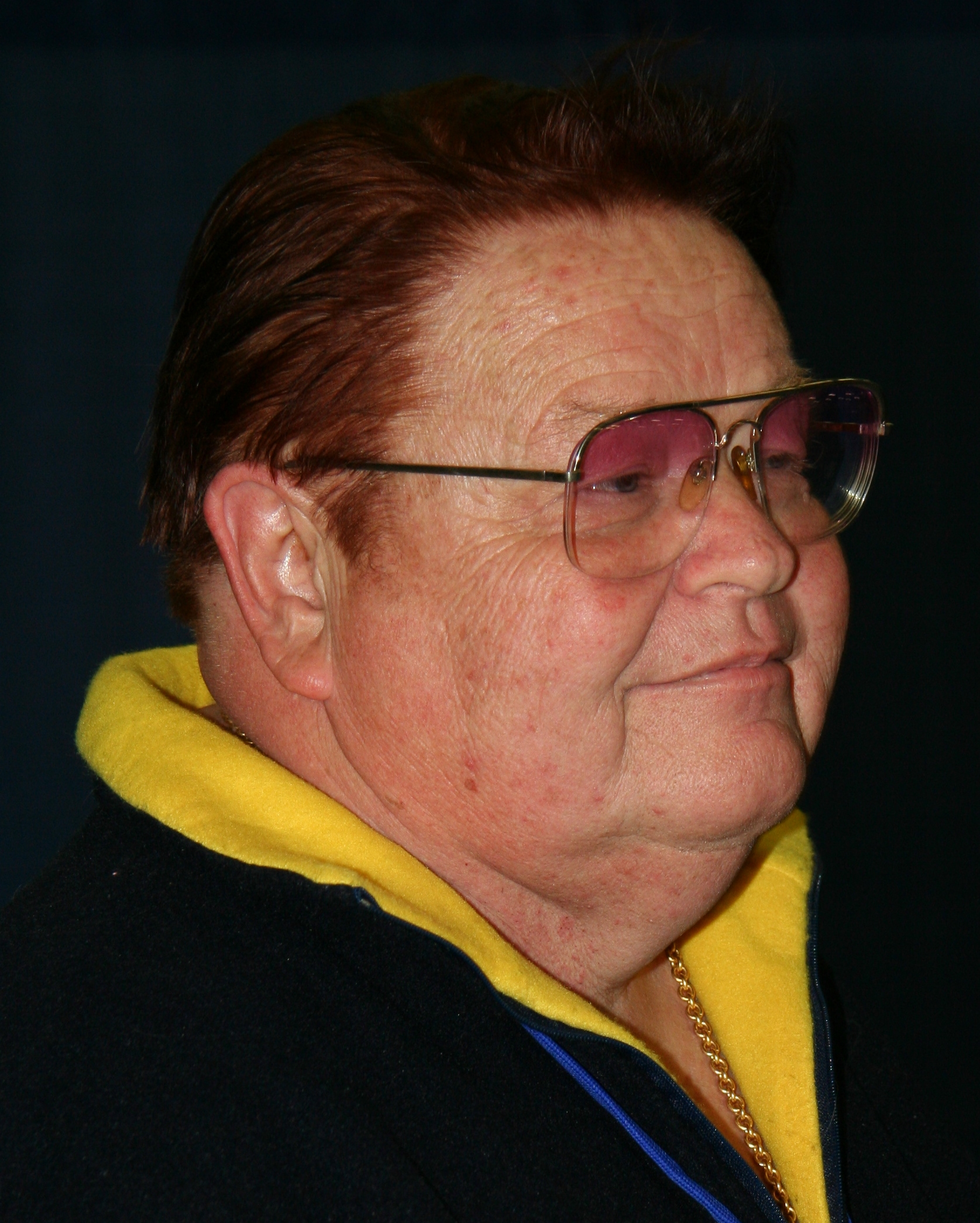
Ole Savior

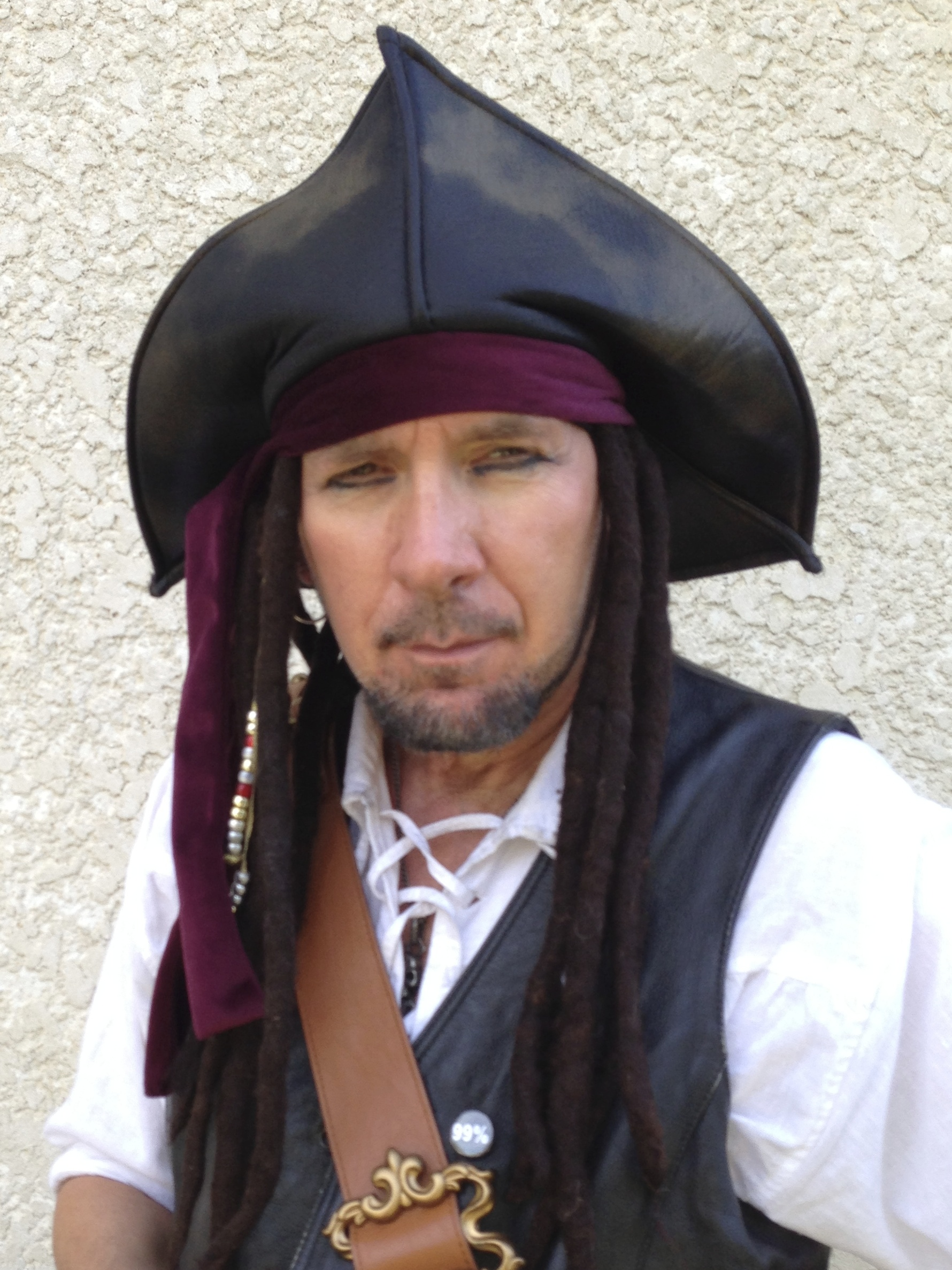
Captain Jack Sparrow

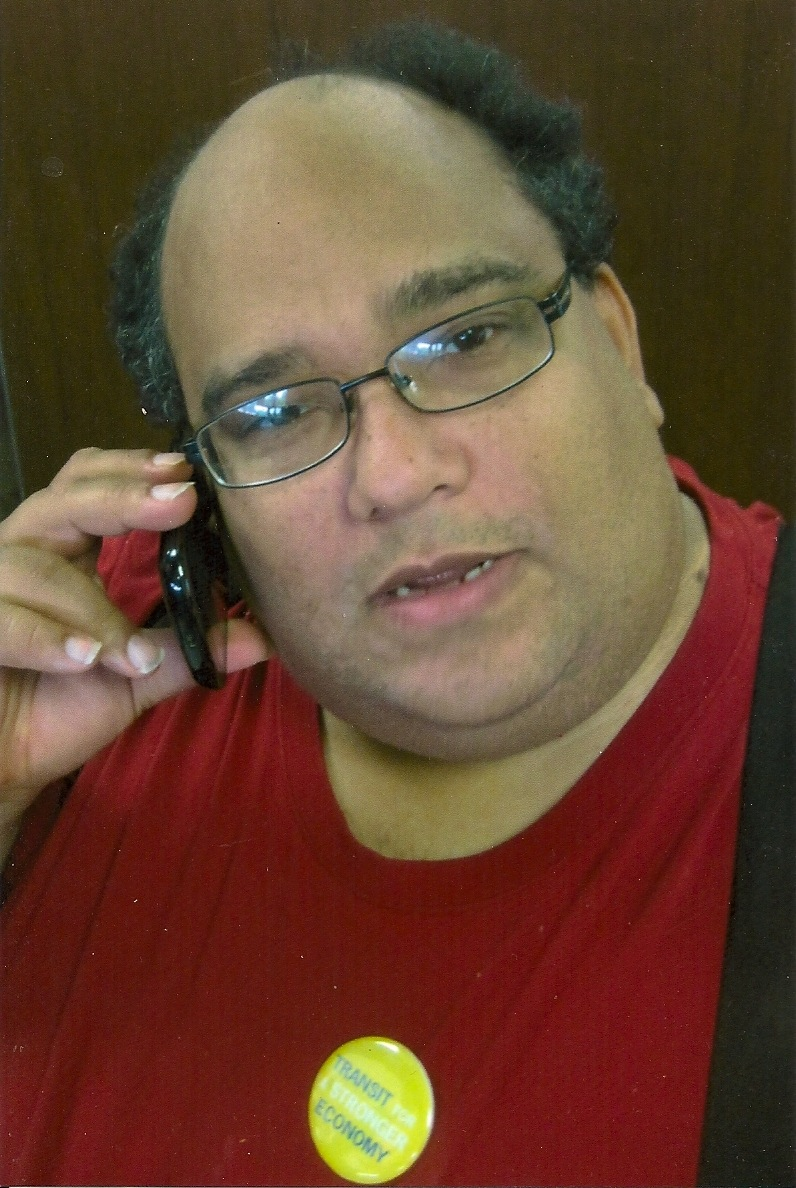
John Charles Wilson

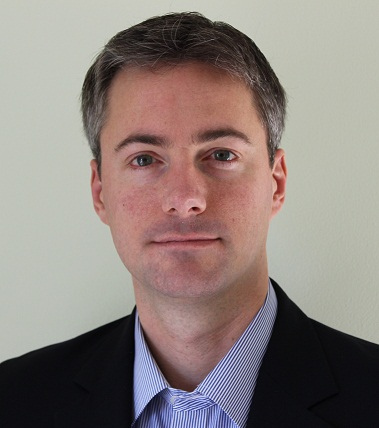
Cam Winton

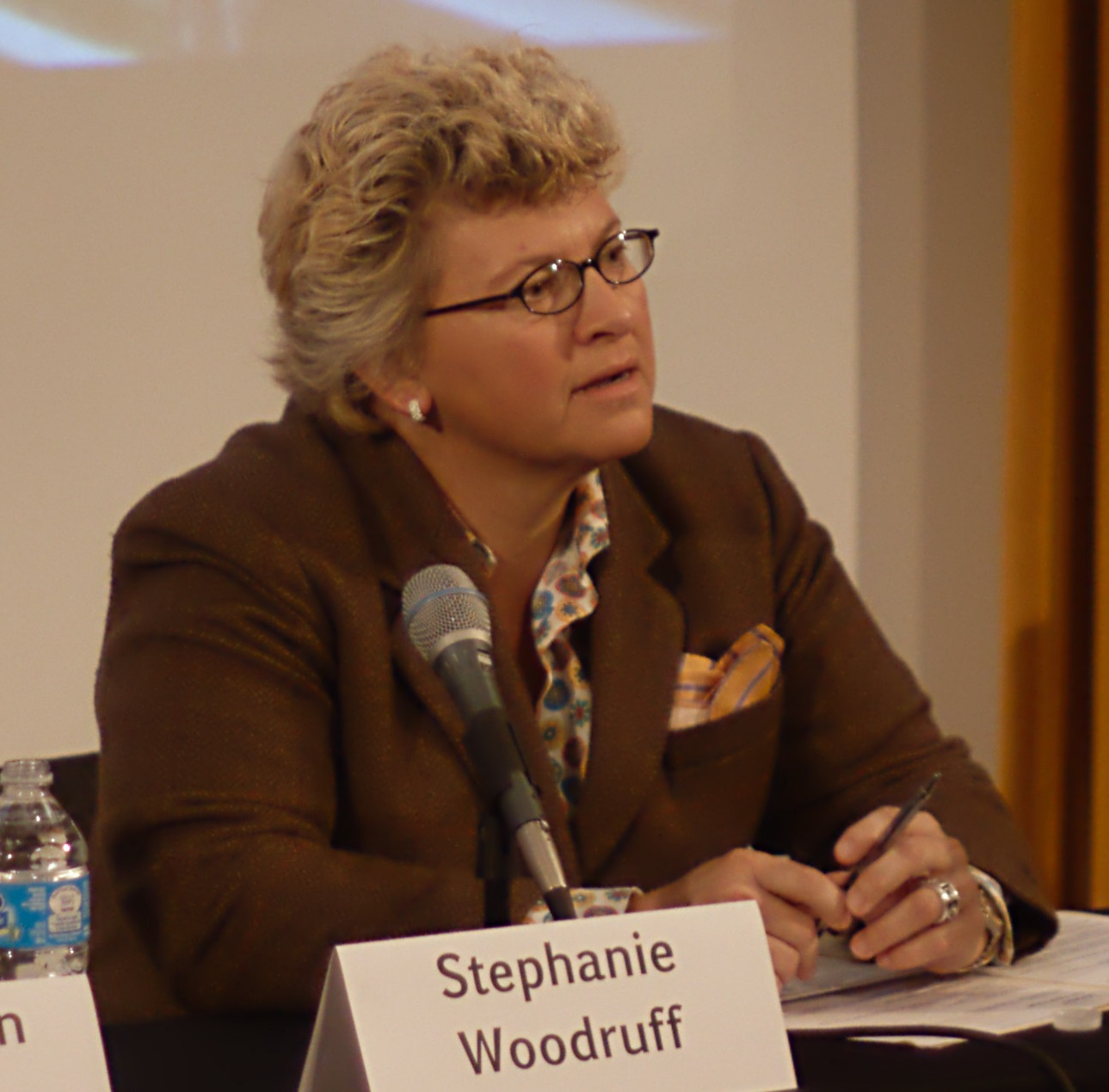
Stephanie Woodruff

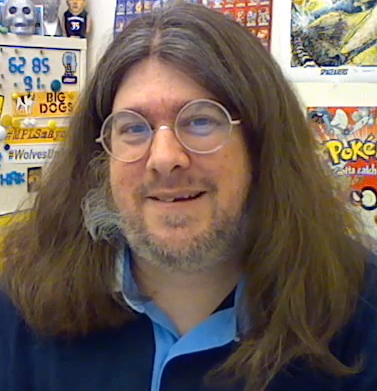
Christopher Robin Zimmerman
- Not pictured: Mark V. Anderson, Neal Baxter, Alicia K. Bennett, Edmund Bernard Bruyere, Bob Carney Jr., Christopher Clark, James Everett, Cyd Gorman, Mike Gould, John Leslie Hartwig, Jaymie Kelly, Tony Lane, Doug Mann, Abdun M. Rahaman, Joshua Rea, James L. Stroud Jr., Jeffrey Alan Wagner, Rahn V. Workcuff

=== Withdrawn ===
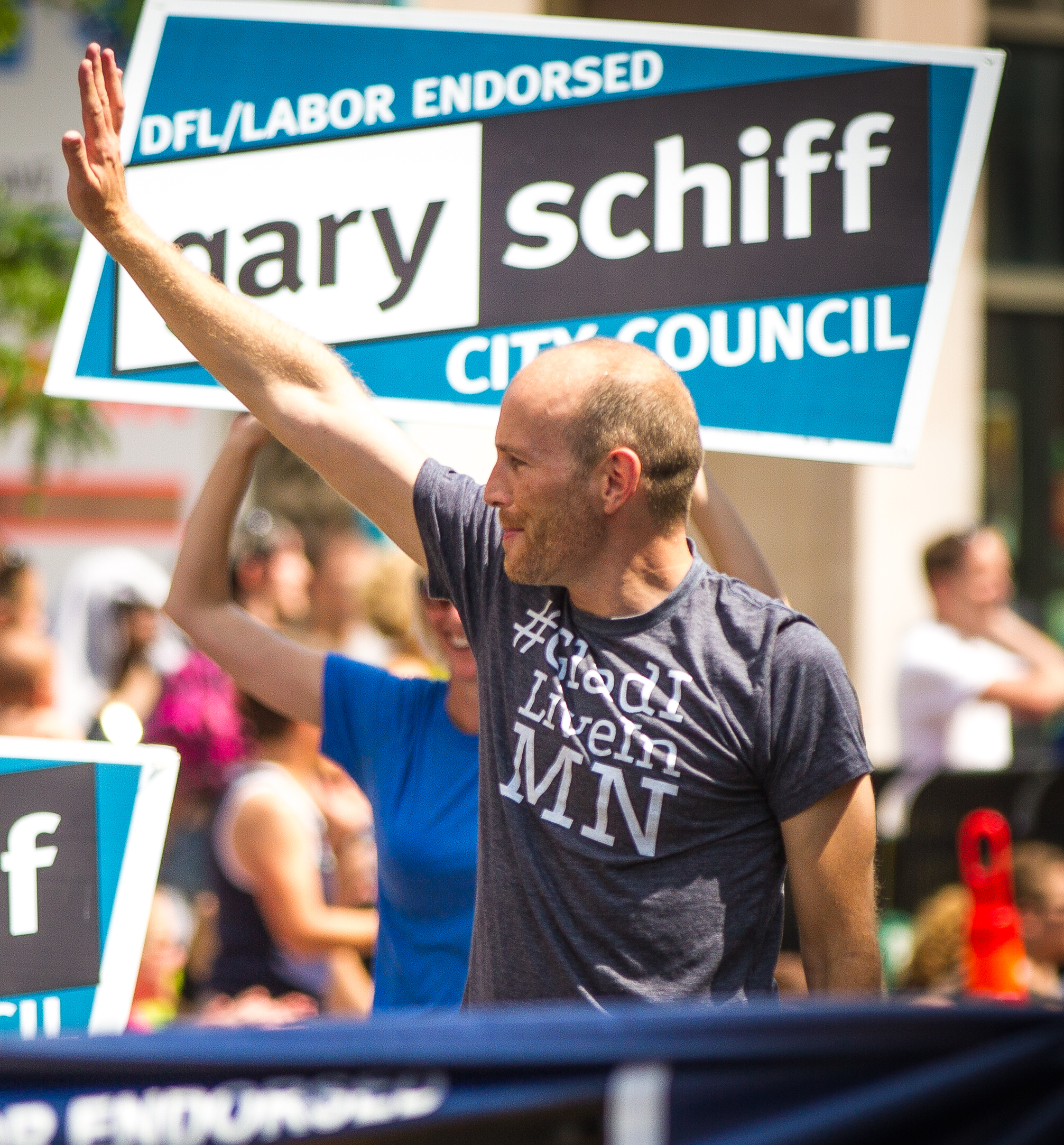
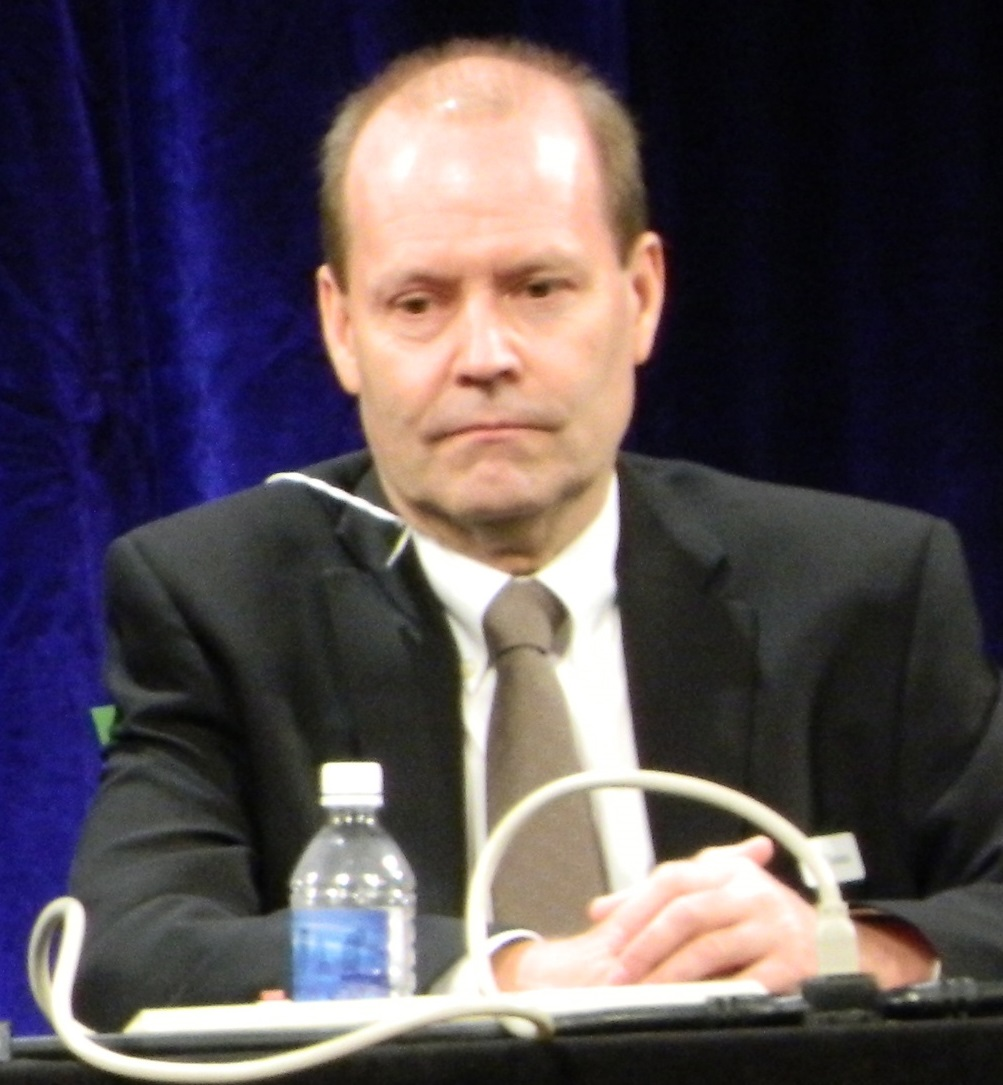
Schiff, Thomas
- On June 19, DFL City Council member Gary Schiff announced an end to his campaign and backed Hodges.
- Jim Thomas announced his departure from the race on August 12 and put his support behind Andrew.

=== Declined ===
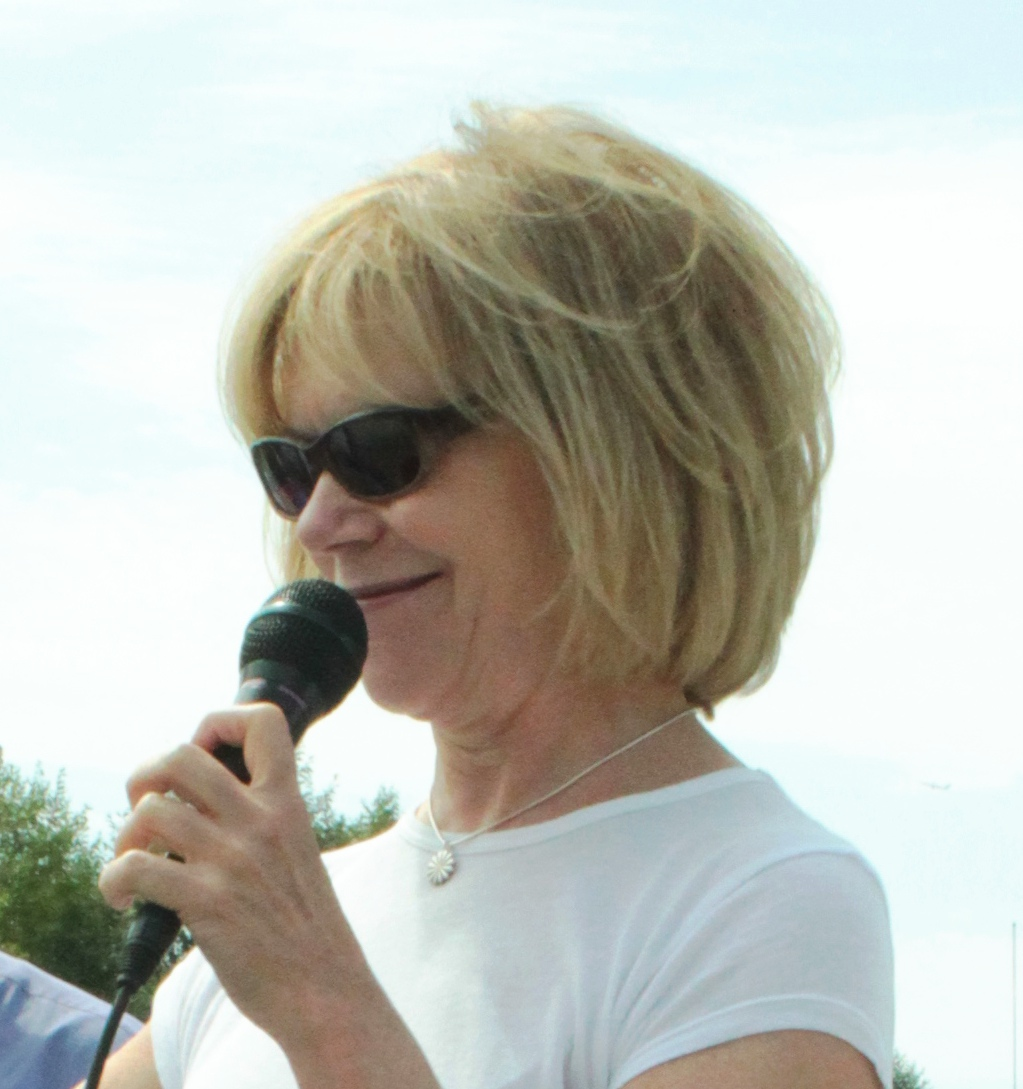
Tina Smith in 2012

- John Erwin, Minneapolis Park and Recreation Board Commissioner
- Jim Graves, businessman and Democratic nominee for the 6th congressional district in 2012
- Tom Hoch, President and CEO of the Hennepin Theatre Trust
- R. T. Rybak, incumbent mayor
- Hussein Samatar, Minneapolis School Board member (died August 25, 2013)
- Tina Smith, chief of staff for Governor Mark Dayton

== Campaigns ==
=== Announcements ===
Almost a month before Rybak announced that he intended to leave office, DFL City Council member Betsy Hodges of Minneapolis' thirteenth ward declared that she would run for mayor. Her plans, however, were contingent upon whether Rybak would elect to run for a fourth time. When Rybak made his announcement in December 2012, Hodges formally proclaimed her candidacy.

The Star Tribune reported in early December 2012 that former DFL City Council President Jackie Cherryhomes was also considering a bid for the mayor's office. Cherryhomes last held office in 2001, but remained involved at the Minneapolis City Hall as a lobbyist. Like Hodges, she only intended to run if Rybak opted not to and, like Hodges, she announced that she would run promptly after Rybak declared he would not, on December 27.

DFL City Council member Gary Schiff from Minneapolis' ninth ward was also mulling a mayoral run in mid-December when he filed paperwork to form a committee that could support his potential candidacy. Unlike Hodges and Cherryhomes, Schiff stated that whether he would run or not would probably not be contingent upon what Rybak decided to do. On January 29, Schiff announced that he would seek the mayor's seat.

Fifth ward City Council member Don Samuels, another DFLer, was considering running for the office shortly after Rybak announced that he wouldn't run again. Samuels had served on the City Council for a decade at that time and had most recently run but dropped out of a race for Hennepin County Commissioner. A day after Schiff made his candidacy official, Samuels entered the race as well, becoming the third sitting member of City Council to do so.

Mark Andrew, formerly a Hennepin County Commissioner and the chair of the DFL from 1995 until 1997, expressed in early January that he was "very interested" in potentially vying for the position of mayor. Since leaving public office, Andrew had begun GreenMark, an environmental marketing firm. He officially declared his candidacy on February 7, 2013, acknowledging his late entrance into the race relative to some of his opponents.

Running as an independent, attorney Cam Winton is mentioned in a Star Tribune article dated March 20, 2013. Winton, a Republican, stated that he did not intend to seek the DFL endorsement, making him the only candidate declared at the time to do so.

Dan Cohen, a Republican former City Council member, said on May 28 that he would run for mayor if the DFL failed to agree on an endorsement. Cohen, who sits on Minneapolis' Charter and Planning Commissions, was a Council member in the 1960s He last ran for mayor in 1969, losing to Charles Stenvig. Cohen formally declared his candidacy on June 18.

=== Pre-convention debates ===
The first debate between mayoral candidates took place on March 27 at the University of Minnesota's Humphrey School of Public Affairs. Moderated by professor of political science Larry Jacobs, as well as some of his students, the debate included Andrew, Hodges, Schiff, Cherryhomes, and Samuels, noted by Jacobs as being the "leading DFL candidates". Winton observed the debate from the audience but was not invited to participate as he was not seeking the DFL endorsement. Candidates fielded questions on the new Vikings stadium (responding anywhere from heavily in favor of the project to staunchly against it), property taxes (no candidate accepted a pledge from Jacobs not to raise them), how to revitalize North Minneapolis, and their qualifications for the job of mayor.

=== DFL endorsement convention ===
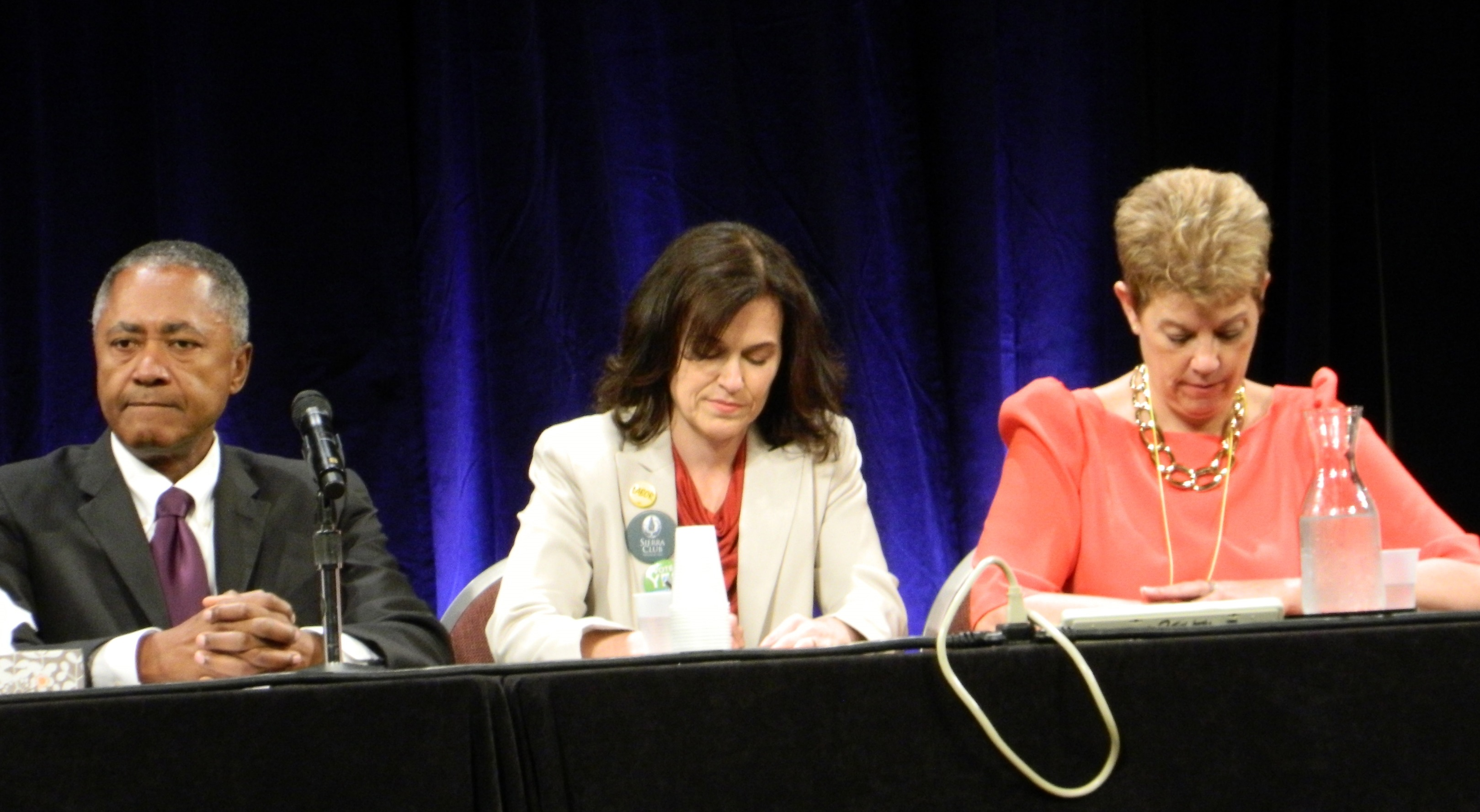
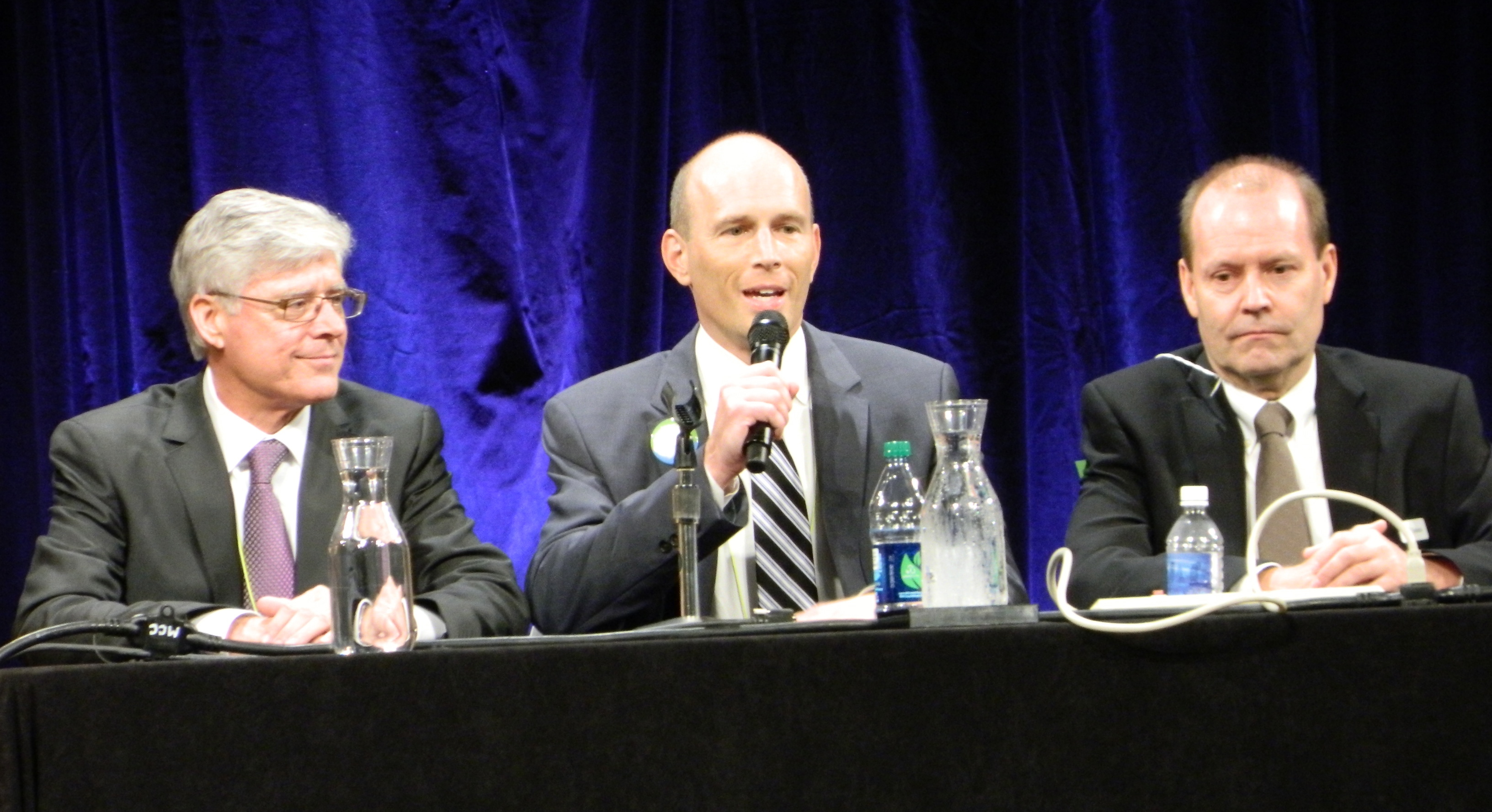
Samuels, Hodges, Cherryhomes, Andrew, Schiff, and Thomas seated at the DFL endorsement convention on June 15, 2013

An endorsement convention was held by the DFL on June 15, 2013, at the Minneapolis Convention Center. All candidates then declared with the exception of Winton (Andrew, Cherryhomes, Hodges, Samuels, Schiff, and Thomas) sought the nomination and were present at the event. Sixty percent of delegate votes were required to receive the endorsement.

During the first round of voting, Jim Thomas, Cheryhomes, and Samuels were eliminated as each failed to secure the ten percent of the vote required to move on to the second round. Schiff was eliminated after the second ballot, leaving Andrew and Hodges. Andrew came first in every round of voting but never reached the 60 percent threshold. Hodges invited her delegates outside of the Convention Center to eat pizza. Their absence meant that a quorum was not present at the convention and so, on the fifth ballot, the convention ended with no endorsement.

== General election ==
=== Polling ===
Poll source	Date(s) administered	Sample size	Margin of error	Mark Andrew	Jackie Cherryhomes	Dan Cohen	Bob Fine	Betsy Hodges	Don Samuels	Cam Winton	Stephanie Woodruff	Other	Undecided
Pulse Opinion Research	September 8–10, 2013	800	± 3.5%	10%	7%	16%	1%	14%	16%	9%	5%	6%	16%

=== Results ===
None of the candidates passed the threshold to be elected in the first round, necessitating several rounds of vote transfers. Betsy Hodges was elected in the 33rd round.

Party/principle	Candidate	% 1st Choice	Rounds																
Party/principle	Candidate	% 1st Choice	1	2	3	4	5	6	7	8	9	10	11	12	13	14	15	16	17
DFL	Betsy Hodges	36.47	28,962	28,983	28,984	28,988	28,994	28,999	29,003	29,015	29,023	29,027	29,031	29,036	29,043	29,071	29,103	29,117	29,123
DFL	Mark Andrew	24.74	19,648	19,664	19,668	19,669	19,676	19,677	19,683	19,688	19,690	19,693	19,698	19,708	19,725	19,738	19,754	19,796	19,803
DFL	Don Samuels	10.51	8,350	8,354	8,355	8,357	8,365	8,370	8,373	8,378	8,381	8,382	8,385	8,392	8,397	8,405	8,414	8,423	8,428
independent responsible inclusive	Cam Winton	9.49	7,533	7,540	7,542	7,544	7,544	7,547	7,548	7,556	7,562	7,564	7,567	7,570	7,571	7,576	7,591	7,593	7,613
DFL	Jackie Cherryhomes	4.47	3,548	3,551	3,551	3,551	3,551	3,556	3,560	3,566	3,568	3,571	3,580	3,586	3,609	3,613	3,617	3,628	3,636
DFL	Bob Fine	2.65	2,101	2,103	2,105	2,106	2,108	2,112	2,115	2,117	2,118	2,121	2,122	2,125	2,135	2,137	2,141	2,147	2,147
Jobs Downtown Casino	Dan Cohen	2.28	1,808	1,811	1,813	1,815	1,815	1,816	1,819	1,820	1,826	1,832	1,837	1,845	1,852	1,855	1,859	1,865	1,870
DFL	Stephanie Woodruff	1.28	1,014	1,016	1,017	1,018	1,019	1,020	1,020	1,024	1,025	1,029	1,029	1,033	1,039	1,047	1,054	1,060	1,060
Simplify Government	Mark V. Anderson	1.24	984	985	986	989	990	995	996	997	1,002	1,007	1,010	1,018	1,020	1,025	1,028	1,029	1,045
Green Party of Minnesota	Doug Mann	0.98	779	782	787	791	794	796	796	800	801	802	809	813	816	831	836	841	846
Republican Party of Minnesota	Ole Savior	0.88	700	701	702	702	702	705	705	705	711	715	715	720	722	724	734	735	753
Green Party of Minnesota	James Everett	0.44	349	350	351	352	355	358	358	359	365	368	370	371	371	380	383	384	388
DFL	Alicia K. Bennett	0.45	354	355	355	355	356	356	359	360	363	367	370	376	381	382	382	393	395
We the people...	Abdul M. Rahaman "The Rock"	0.45	355	356	356	356	357	358	360	360	360	365	369	372	377	382	382	386	388
Count All Rankings	Captain Jack Sparrow	0.33	265	270	271	271	277	278	279	279	280	284	288	293	295	299	304	307	309
Libertarian Party of Minnesota	Christopher Clark	0.24	192	194	196	196	196	197	197	197	200	202	202	203	205	206	212	212	266
Socialist Workers Party	Tony Lane	0.28	220	221	224	224	224	225	226	227	228	230	231	236	238	244	246	250	251
Stop Foreclosures Now	Jaymie Kelly	0.25	197	198	198	198	199	200	203	204	204	206	215	220	224	236	241	242	243
DFL	Mike Gould	0.26	204	207	207	207	207	207	209	210	210	214	217	218	220	221	227	235	236
Minnesota Pirate Party	Kurtis W. Hanna	0.25	200	200	200	201	202	202	202	202	204	204	206	207	207	214	214	216	222
Libertarian	Christopher Robin Zimmerman	0.22	172	172	172	173	173	177	178	179	182	185	186	188	190	192	194	194	
DFL	Jeffrey Alan Wagner	0.21	167	167	167	167	167	168	171	171	172	174	176	179	186	188	189		
Independent	Neal Baxter	0.19	147	147	147	148	148	153	153	153	168	172	173	176	178	180			
Local Energy/Food	Troy Benjegerdes	0.19	149	149	150	150	150	150	152	156	157	158	158	164	167				
DFL	Gregg A. Iverson	0.18	146	146	147	149	149	149	149	149	152	153	155	156					
Jobs & Justice	Merrill Anderson	0.14	109	109	109	112	113	113	118	121	122	123	139						
End Homelessness Now	Joshua Rea	0.14	110	110	110	113	113	114	115	115	116	119							
Last Minneapolis Mayor	Bill Kahn	0.13	102	103	104	105	106	106	108	108	110								
Independent	John Leslie Hartwig	0.12	97	97	99	99	100	101	101	101									
Legacy-Next Generation	Edmund Bernard Bruyere	0.09	72	72	72	72	72	73	73										
The people's choice	James "Jimmy" L. Stroud Jr.	0.08	65	66	66	66	68	68											
Independence Party of Minnesota	Rahn V. Workcuff	0.08	66	66	66	66	66												
Demand Transit Revolution	Bob "Again" Carney Jr	0.07	56	56	56	57													
Police Reform	Cyd Gorman	0.05	39	39	39														
Lauraist Communist	John Charles Wilson	0.05	37	38															
Write-in	N/A	0.15	118																
Exhausted ballots				37	43	57	59	69	86	98	115	148	177	210	247	269	310	362	393
Party/principle	Candidate	% 1st Choice	Rounds																% Final
Party/principle	Candidate	% 1st Choice	18	19	20	21	22	23	24	25	26	27	28	29	30	31	32	33	% Final
DFL	Betsy Hodges	36.47	29,172	29,185	29,259	29,316	29,324	29,382	29,417	29,490	29,592	29,606	30,045	30,289	30,672	30,963	32,581	38,870	48.95
DFL	Mark Andrew	24.74	19,813	19,843	19,851	19,876	19,884	19,907	19,942	19,987	20,022	20,044	20,151	20,209	20,336	20,527	21,831	24,972	31.44
DFL	Don Samuels	10.51	8,439	8,455	8,461	8,478	8,483	8,494	8,501	8,530	8,556	8,580	8,623	8,699	8,844	9,097	10,301		
independent responsible inclusive	Cam Winton	9.49	7,634	7,637	7,642	7,647	7,704	7,715	7,718	7,723	7,730	7,823	7,841	7,936	8,030	8,449	8,969		
DFL	Jackie Cherryhomes	4.47	3,638	3,654	3,662	3,669	3,671	3,682	3,690	3,711	3,741	3,751	3,769	3,869	3,961	4,070			
DFL	Bob Fine	2.65	2,155	2,168	2,172	2,176	2,182	2,198	2,204	2,223	2,236	2,255	2,286	2,343	2,417	2,559			
Jobs Downtown Casino	Dan Cohen	2.28	1,879	1,887	1,897	1,900	1,916	1,939	1,944	1,954	1,963	2,016	2,049	2,102	2,143				
DFL	Stephanie Woodruff	1.28	1,063	1,078	1,085	1,089	1,090	1,098	1,115	1,186	1,198	1,202	1,239	1,259					
Simplify Government	Mark V. Anderson	1.24	1,049	1,049	1,053	1,056	1,074	1,078	1,086	1,097	1,106	1,153	1,163						
Green Party of Minnesota	Doug Mann	0.98	863	867	899	961	971	993	996	1,002	1,089	1,106							
Republican Party of Minnesota	Ole Savior	0.88	757	759	760	760	798	810	814	817	817								
Green Party of Minnesota	James Everett	0.44	400	403	413	428	431	440	444	452									
DFL	Alicia K. Bennett	0.45	396	416	425	431	434	437	443										
We the people...	Abdul M. Rahaman "The Rock"	0.45	391	396	398	398	399	415											
Count All Rankings	Captain Jack Sparrow	0.33	325	329	333	341	352												
Libertarian Party of Minnesota	Christopher Clark	0.24	280	283	283	287													
Socialist Workers Party	Tony Lane	0.28	256	263	276														
Stop Foreclosures Now	Jaymie Kelly	0.25	248	252															
DFL	Mike Gould	0.26	238																
Minnesota Pirate Party	Kurtis W. Hanna	0.25																	
Libertarian	Christopher Robin Zimmerman	0.22																	
DFL	Jeffrey Alan Wagner	0.21																	
Independent	Neal Baxter	0.19																	
Local Energy/Food	Troy Benjegerdes	0.19																	
DFL	Gregg A. Iverson	0.18																	
Jobs & Justice	Merrill Anderson	0.14																	
End Homelessness Now	Joshua Rea	0.14																	
Last Minneapolis Mayor	Bill Kahn	0.13																	
Independent	John Leslie Hartwig	0.12																	
Legacy-Next Generation	Edmund Bernard Bruyere	0.09																	
The people's choice	James "Jimmy" L. Stroud Jr.	0.08																	
Independence Party of Minnesota	Rahn V. Workcuff	0.08																	
Demand Transit Revolution	Bob "Again" Carney Jr	0.07																	
Police Reform	Cyd Gorman	0.05																	
Lauraist Communist	John Charles Wilson	0.05																	
Write-in	N/A	0.15																	
Exhausted ballots			419	491	546	602	702	827	1,101	1,243	1,365	1,879	2,249	2,709	3,012	3,750	5,733	15,573	19.61
Valid votes: 79,415 (Note: Total votes counted in the first round. Does not include undervotes, overvotes, defective, or spoiled ballots.); Threshold: 39,708; Undervotes: 686; Turnout: 80,101 (33.38%); Registered voters: 239,985
Source: Minneapolis Election & Voter Services

== See also ==
- Minneapolis municipal elections, 2013
- Minneapolis City Council elections, 2013
