= Brian Melendez =

American lawyer (born 1964)

State Chair of the DFL
- In office 2005–2011
- Preceded by: Mike Erlandson
- Succeeded by: Ken Martin

Personal details
- Born: 1964 (age 61–62) Silver Creek, New York

Brian Ross Melendez (born 1964) is a U.S. lawyer and politician from Minnesota.

Melendez was born in Silver Creek, New York, in 1964. He attended college at Harvard, where he served as vice-chairperson and chairperson of the Harvard-Radcliffe Undergraduate Council.

Melendez was admitted to the bar in 1991. From 2001 to 2002, he was president of the Hennepin County Bar Association, from 2007 to 2008 was Minnesota Bar Association president.

Melendez's first political office was as DFL party chair for MN-5. Melendez served as State Chair of the Democratic–Farmer–Labor Party (DFL) from 2005 to 2011. While serving as state chair, Melendez referred to the Tea Party movement as 'borderline insanity' and dismissed it as an internal faction within the Republican party, that would serve only to benefit the DFL and Democrats as a whole. He stepped down following the announcement of DFLer Mark Dayton's election as Governor of Minnesota in 2010. He currently works as an attorney.

Party political offices
| Preceded by Mike Erlandson | Democratic–Farmer–Labor Party State Chair; 2005–2011 | Succeeded by Ken Martin |
