= Todd Otis =

American politician

State Chair of the Minnesota Democratic–Farmer–Labor Party
- In office 1990–1993
- Preceded by: Ruth Stanoch
- Succeeded by: Rick Stafford

Member of the Minnesota House of Representatives
- In office 1979–1991

Personal details
- Born: June 22, 1945 (age 81) Minneapolis, Minnesota, U.S.
- Party: Democratic
- Relations: James C. Otis (father)
- Education: Harvard University (AB); Columbia University (MS)

Todd H. Otis (born June 22, 1945) is an American businessman and politician.

== Early life and education ==
From Minneapolis, Minnesota, Otis received his bachelor's degree in American history in 1967 from Harvard University. He then served in the Peace Corps from 1967 to 1969 and was stationed in Senegal. In 1970, Otis then received his master's degree in journalism from Columbia University.

== Career ==
Otis worked in corporate community affairs. He also wrote about nuclear energy and renewable energy. Otis served in the Minnesota House of Representatives from 1979 to 1991 and was a Democrat. Otis served as chair of the Minnesota Democratic–Farmer–Labor Party from 1990 to 1993. In 1994, he ran for Minnesota governor and Minnesota auditor but lost in both primary elections. His father was James C. Otis, who served on the Minnesota Supreme Court.

Party political offices
Preceded by Ruth Stanoch	Democratic–Farmer–Labor Party State Chair; 1990-1993	Succeeded by Rick Stafford
