= Mike Erlandson =

American politician (born 1964)

State Chair of the Minnesota Democratic–Farmer–Labor Party
- In office 1999–2005
- Preceded by: Richard Senese
- Succeeded by: Brian Melendez

Personal details
- Born: April 14, 1964 (age 62) Fridley, Minnesota
- Party: Minnesota Democratic-Farmer-Labor Party
- Spouse: Dawn
- Children: 2
- Occupation: corporate executive, political activist

Michael Erlandson (born April 14, 1964) is a Minnesota businessman and former Minnesota Democratic-Farmer-Labor Party (DFL) chair. He is currently a principal at Aurora Strategic Advisors, a public affairs company based in Minneapolis and continues to be active in Minnesota politics.

Prior to Aurora he was Vice President of Corporate Communications and Public Affairs and Vice President of Government Affairs for Supervalu Corporation, based in Eden Prairie, Minnesota. Prior to joining Supervalu, he served as chief of staff to U.S. Congressman Martin Olav Sabo from 1993 until Sabo retired in 2007. He also served as chair of the DFL from 1999 to 2005.

Erlandson ran for Sabo's 5th Congressional District seat in 2006, but finished second in a contested primary to Keith Ellison. Ellison went on to win in November.

In addition to leading Supervalu's Communications and Government Affairs Departments, Erlandson was their federal political action committee (ValuPAC) chairman. He served on and managed their foundation board and helped create their enterprise environmental steering committee.

Erlandson has appeared on national television and radio shows including: NBC's Today Show, Hardball, ABC's This Week with George Stephanopoulos, CNN, C-SPAN, and NPR. He was named one of Twin Cities next generation of business & community leaders by The Minneapolis/St. Paul Business Journal and was a member of the Bipartisan Policy Center's National Transportation Policy Project.

Erlandson grew up in the Twin Cities suburb of Fridley. He graduated from St. John's University in Collegeville in 1986 and from Harvard University's Kennedy School Senior Managers in Government Program in 1997. He is married, has two children and lives in Minneapolis.

During his leadership of the State Democratic Party (DFL) and prior to joining Supervalu, Erlandson hosted a radio show on Air American Minnesota called "The Mike Erlandson Show," and continues to be appear on local public affairs programs including regular appearances on KSTP TVs At Issue with Tom Hauser (Sunday's at 10am).

== Electoral history ==
- 2006 Race for U.S. House of Representatives - 5th District (Democratic Primary)
  - Keith Ellison (DFL), 41%
  - Mike Erlandson (DFL), 31%
  - Ember Reichgott Junge (DFL), 21%
  - Paul Ostrow (DFL), 5%

Party political offices
Preceded by Richard Senese	Democratic–Farmer–Labor Party State Chair; 1999-2005	Succeeded by Brian Melendez
