= Rick Stafford =

American politician (1952–2017)

State Chair of the DFL
- In office 1993 – August 26, 1995
- Preceded by: Todd Otis
- Succeeded by: Mark Andrew

Personal details
- Born: August 25, 1952 Fort Riley, Kansas
- Died: September 2, 2017 (aged 65) Minneapolis, Minnesota

Richard 'Rick' Wesley Stafford Jr. (August 25, 1952 – September 2, 2017) was a U.S. politician from Minnesota. He was the State Chair of the Democratic-Farmer-Labor Party from 1993 to 1995. He was the first openly gay chair of any major party in the United States.

Stafford was born on August 25, 1952, in Fort Riley, Kansas, and grew up in New Richland, Minnesota. As a child he dealt with bone disorders that kept him bedridden at times. He received a degree from Mankato State University in 1974, and was hired as the editor and publisher of the West Concord Enterprise. In 1976, he was elected to the state DFL executive committee. In the 1980s, he was diagnosed with HIV and became involved in the Minnesota AIDS Project, advocating for patients during the AIDs epidemic. In 1993, he was elected as State Chair of the DFL overwhelmingly. He was a strong member of the party's progressive wing, focusing his time on abortion rights, environmentalism, agriculture, and the economy of Greater Minnesota. Stafford resigned in July 1995 after being diagnosed with cancer. He also publicly announced he was struggling to recover from alcoholism. He officially left office on August 26, 1995, and Mark Andrew was elected as his successor.

He died in Minneapolis on September 2, 2017.

Party political offices
Preceded by Todd Otis	Democratic-Farmer-Labor Party State Chair; 1993-1995	Succeeded by Mark Andrew
