= Daniel A. Cohen =

Israeli accounting academic

Daniel A. Cohen (Hebrew: דניאל כהן) originally from Romania, is an accounting academic currently affiliated with Vanderbilt University.

Cohen obtained a bachelor's of Arts degree in economics and statistics from the Hebrew University of Jerusalem in 1997, followed by a Master of Business Administration in Finance in 1999. He then earned a doctorate in accounting from Northwestern University's Kellogg School of Management in 2004. Cohen began his teaching career at the University of Southern California, then moved to New York University's Stern School of Business in 2005. In 2010, he joined the University of Texas at Dallas faculty, where he was named an Ashbel Smith Professor in 2015. He later held the Arthur Andersen & Co. Chair in Accounting at Mays Business School, Texas A&M University. In 2022, Cohen was appointed Frances Hampton Currey Professor of Accounting at Vanderbilt University's Owen Graduate School of Management.
