= Cohen v. Cowles Media Co. =

- Supreme Court of the United States

Argued March 27, 1991 Decided June 24, 1991
- Full case name: Dan Cohen v. Cowles Media Company, dba Minneapolis Star & Tribune Company, et al.
- Citations: 501 U.S. 663 (more) 111 S. Ct. 2513; 115 L. Ed. 2d 586; 1991 U.S. LEXIS 3639; 59 U.S.L.W. 4773; 18 Media L. Rep. 2273; 91 Cal. Daily Op. Service 4796; 91 Daily Journal DAR 7417

Case history
- Prior: 445 N.W.2d 248 (Minn. Ct. App. 1989); affirmed in part, reversed in part, 457 N.W.2d 199 (Minn. 1990); cert. granted, 498 U.S. 1011 (1990).
- Subsequent: Affirmed on remand, 479 N.W.2d 387 (Minn. 1992); on rehearing, 481 N.W.2d 840 (Minn. 1992).

Court membership
- Chief Justice William Rehnquist Associate Justices Byron White · Thurgood Marshall; Harry Blackmun · John P. Stevens; Sandra Day O'Connor · Antonin Scalia; Anthony Kennedy · David Souter

Case opinions
- Majority: White, joined by Rehnquist, Stevens, Scalia, Kennedy
- Dissent: Blackmun, joined by Marshall, Souter
- Dissent: Souter, joined by Marshall, Blackmun, O'Connor

Laws applied
- U.S. Const. amend. I

Cohen v. Cowles Media Co., 501 U.S. 663 (1991), was a U.S. Supreme Court case holding that the First Amendment freedom of the press does not exempt journalists from generally applicable laws.

Dan Cohen, a Republican associated with Wheelock Whitney's 1982 Minnesota gubernatorial run, provided inculpatory information on the Democratic challenger for Lieutenant Governor, Marlene Johnson, to the Minneapolis Star Tribune and St. Paul Pioneer Press in exchange for a promise that his identity as the source would not be published. Over the reporters' objections, editors of both newspapers independently decided to publish his name. Cohen consequently lost his job at an advertising agency. He sued Cowles Media Company, who owned the Minneapolis Star Tribune.

In 1988, a jury of six found in Cohen's favor. The Minnesota Supreme Court reversed. The United States Supreme Court, while refusing to reinstate the damages, remanded the case to the Minnesota Supreme Court, which reinstated the jury's original verdict of $200,000.

The Cowles Media Company was found liable based on a theory of promissory estoppel.

== Opinion of the Court ==
The Supreme Court found, in a majority decision, that:

1. Against respondent's claims that it had no jurisdiction: citing Orr v. Orr (1979), whether the arguments in inferior courts were federal law arguments was irrelevant, and moreover the Minnesota Supreme Court had used federal law and respondent had relied on First Amendment protection.
2. Promissory estoppel being a state action, the Fourteenth Amendment applies, and hence the First Amendment is triggered, citing New York Times Co. v. Sullivan (1964). However, since the state principle of promissory estoppel is a generally applicable principle, there is no specific application of the First Amendment to the press, over and above that of any other citizen, citing Associated Press v. NLRB (1937). Cohen had not used the promissory estoppel argument to avoid the hurdle of a libel case, but for identifiable pecuniary losses, distinguishing the case from Hustler Magazine, Inc. v. Falwell (1988). Consequently, any restriction on reporting was "incidental, and constitutionally insignificant" result of applying a generally applicable law.
3. Deciding whether the claim under promissory estoppel was valid, and whether the state constitution shielded the press, was a matter for the Minnesota Supreme Court, and on that basis the request for reinstatement of damages was denied, and the case remanded to the inferior court.

=== Dissents ===
Justice Blackmun's dissent focussed on the proposition that applying promissory estoppel punished the publication of truth.

Justice Souter's dissent was based on the balance of "the importance of the information to public discourse" to the other interests involved. In this case the potential effect of the publication of Cohen's identity on an election for public office was thought to be compelling.

== See also ==
- List of United States Supreme Court cases, volume 501
- List of United States Supreme Court cases
- Lists of United States Supreme Court cases by volume
- List of United States Supreme Court cases by the Rehnquist Court
- Promissory estoppel
