= James C. Otis =

American judge (1912–1993)

James Cornish Otis Jr. (March 23, 1912 – March 15, 1993) was a justice of the Minnesota Supreme Court from 1961 to 1982. He was the father of Todd Otis, a member of the Minnesota Legislature.
