= Mark Andrew =

American businessman and politician

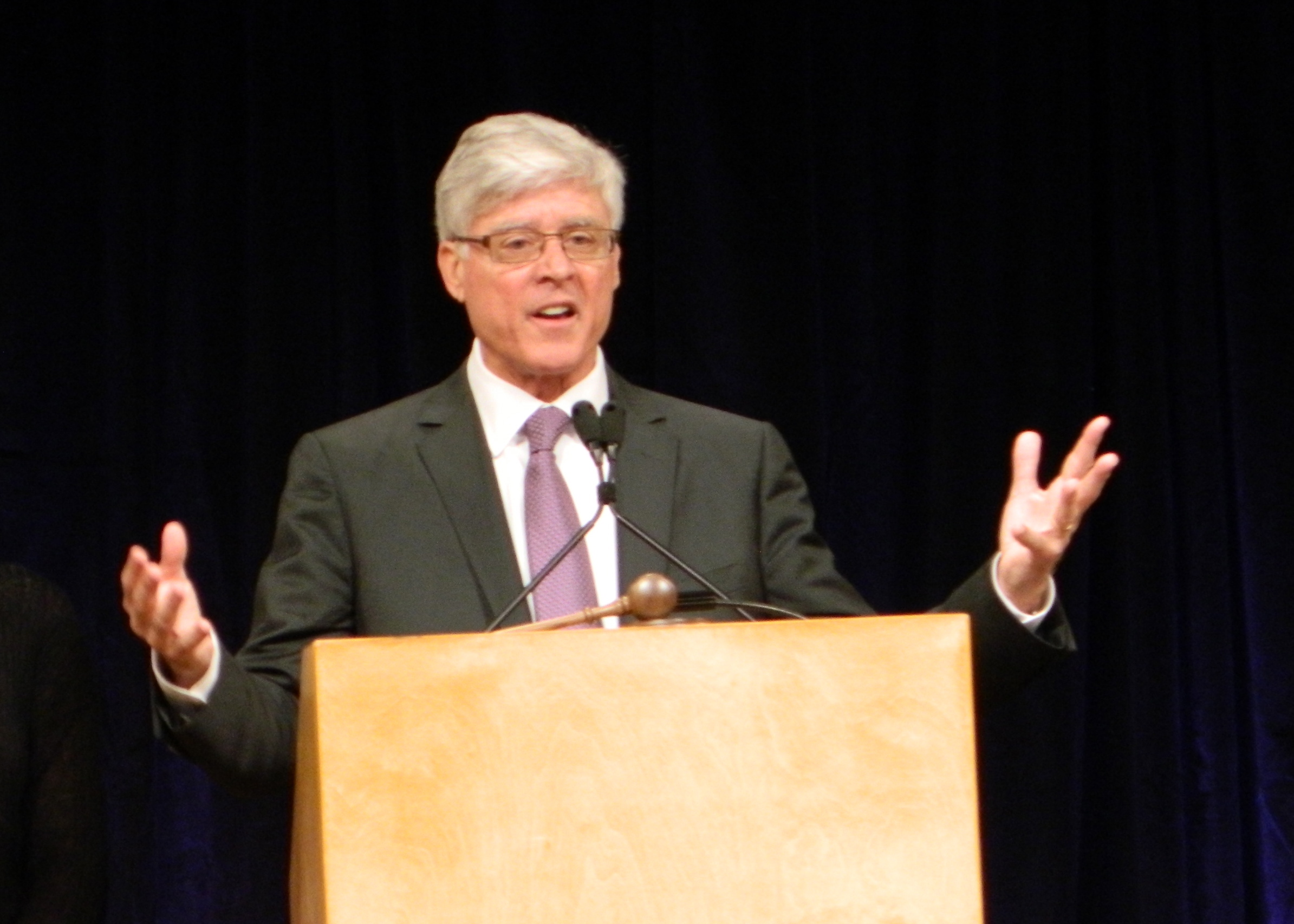
- Andrew at the 2013 DFL Convention

Hennepin County Commissioner, 3rd District
- In office 1983–1999
- Preceded by: Nancy Olkon
- Succeeded by: Gail Dorfman
- Constituency: Western portion of Minneapolis and St. Louis Park

State Chair of Minnesota Democratic-Farmer-Labor Party
- In office 1995–1997
- Preceded by: Rick Stafford
- Succeeded by: Dick Senese

Personal details
- Born: Mark Charles Andrew; July 15, 1950 (age 76)
- Party: Democratic-Farmer-Labor
- Spouse: Connie
- Children: Samantha and John
- Education: University of Minnesota (B.A.)
- Occupation: Businessperson and politician
- Website: www.markforminneapolis.com

Mark Charles Andrew (born July 15, 1950) is an American businessman and politician from Minneapolis, Minnesota. He is a member of the Democratic-Farmer-Labor party and has served as Hennepin County Commissioner, representing the western portion of Minneapolis and St. Louis Park, as well as chair of the Hennepin County Board of Commissioners. He also served as chair of the Democratic-Farmer-Labor party in 1995–1996. In 2007, Andrew founded GreenMark, an environmental marketing firm. In February 2013, Andrew announced his candidacy for mayor in the 2013 Minneapolis mayoral election.

== Early life ==
Andrew grew up in Minneapolis and graduated from Washburn High School in 1968. As a student at the University of Minnesota, Andrew co-founded and served as the first president of the Minnesota Public Interest Research Group, a collective action student organization dedicated to public interest advocacy. After graduating, Andrew worked in State Senator Roger Moe's office as an aide. Following his work with Moe, Andrew worked as a consultant for state public television stations.

== Career ==
At age 32 in 1982, Andrew was elected Hennepin County Commissioner after receiving the Democratic-Farmer-Labor endorsement over incumbent Nancy Olkon. Andrew went on to win reelection in 1986, 1990, and 1994, serving as commissioner until he eventually resigned from the post in 1999.

Andrew was part of the liberal wing of the Hennepin County Board during his time as a commissioner. An environmental proponent, he sponsored a 1986 resolution establishing a program that required every city in the county to provide curbside recycling. In 1990, he worked to expand the program by requiring recycling for rental apartments. Andrew pushed a statewide law aimed at recycling batteries in order to prevent leakage of toxic chemicals.

Andrew introduced the original resolution at the county level for the Midtown Greenway, a bicycle path that runs through central Minneapolis, before the Hennepin County Regional Railroad Authority to purchase the 29th Street Rail corridor upon which the Greenway would eventually be built. The Midtown Greenway Coalition referred to Andrew as "a hero in the history of the Midtown Greenway", noting that "he steered Hennepin County so that the Midtown Greenway was near the center of its radar screen, rather than a blip on the edge."

In favor of pay equity, Andrew supported a plan for a "comparable worth" pay system aimed at equalizing pay between job classifications that are similar in difficulty and responsibility. He also supported an expansion of Hennepin County's affirmative action policy, arguing access to equal employment opportunities is a basic civil right.

Andrew quadrupled funding for childcare support services while in office. He supported better wages for child care providers as a method for attracting well trained individuals.

Andrew supported a resolution to allow reproductive health services and training at the Hennepin County Medical Center. He also supported a successful initiative to provide funding for family planning services for lower-income women. He led an effort in 1994 to provide health benefits for domestic partners of Hennepin County employees. A resolution to provide benefits was passed but was later struck down judicially.

In 1987, Andrew supported the building of a downtown trash incinerator, drawing protests from environmentalists.

Andrew was elected to chair of the Hennepin County Board of Commissioners in 1992 and served until 1995. He served as state chair of the Minnesota Democratic-Farmer-Labor party from 1995 to 1997, replacing Rick Stafford, who resigned due to health issues.

Mark Andrew was alleged to have been investigated by federal authorities regarding his role in a 2002 corruption and bribery incident. Andrew was never indicted and the US Attorney's office refused to confirm Andrew was a target of investigation.

Andrew founded GreenMark, an environmental marketing firm, in 2007. The company has advised the Minnesota Twins on environmental issues related to their stadium. Andrew assisted Target Field, the Twins stadium located in Minneapolis, in obtaining the highest LEED rating of any ballpark in America as well as forging a partnership with Pentair to install a rainwater recycling system. In July 2013, Andrew said that a public vote on municipalization of utilities would be "reckless." Andrew's corporate website lists Xcel Energy as a client.

== Personal life ==
Since he was in college, Andrew has owned two different stands at the Minnesota State Fair: World's Greatest French Fries and Real S'mores. He lives in the Lynnhurst neighborhood with his wife Connie and their two children.

In December 2013, Andrew's smartphone was stolen at the Mall of America. When he tried to recover it, he was beaten with a nightstick. Two of the three suspects were arrested. After their guilty pleas, Andrew worked with a judge to prevent his attackers from going to prison; they were instead sentenced to counseling, mandatory high school graduation, and participation in the arts program of their choice.

Party political offices
Preceded by Rick Stafford	Democratic–Farmer–Labor Party State Chair; 1995-1997	Succeeded by Richard Senese
