= Dan Cohen (politician) =

American author and politician (1936–2024)

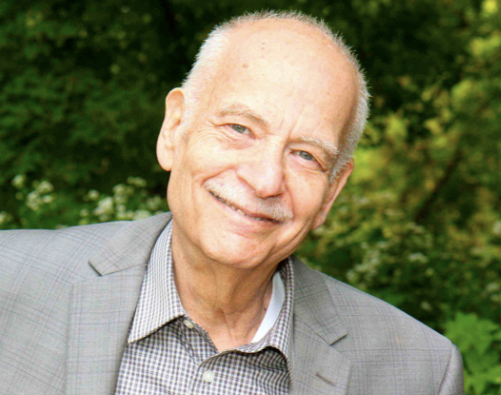
- Cohen in 2013

Minneapolis City Council President
- In office 1967–1969

Member of the Minneapolis City Council from the 7th Ward
- In office 1965–1969

Personal details
- Born: Daniel Willard Cohen; June 10, 1936
- Died: April 4, 2024 (aged 87)
- Party: Independent
- Occupation: Author and businessperson
- Website: dancohenformayor.com

Daniel Willard Cohen (June 10, 1936 – April 4, 2024) was an American author, businessperson and politician from Minneapolis, Minnesota. He had provided financial support to candidates of the Democratic and Republican parties and ran as an independent candidate in the 2013 Minneapolis mayoral election, ultimately finishing seventh out of 35 candidates.

He was a member of the Minneapolis Planning Commission and the Minneapolis Charter Commission. He was a member of the Minneapolis City Council from 1965 to 1969 (President, 1967–69) and the Planning Commission from 1976 to 1980 (President, 1977–79).

== Early life ==
Cohen grew up in Minneapolis and attended Kenwood School and the Breck School, before graduating from the Blake School in 1954. He attended Stanford University and graduated from Harvard Law School.

== Career ==
At age 29, 1965, Cohen was elected to City Council and was City Council President from 1967 to 1969. As a member of City Council, Cohen was the original sponsor and supporter of the Minneapolis Industrial Development Commission. He supported long range residential street paving and the establishment of a municipal Human Rights Commission. In his book Losing the Center: The Decline of American Liberalism, 1968–1992, author Jeffrey Bloodworth describes Cohen running the City Council with a "stern, yet decidedly liberal, hand".

In his second term, and as President of the City Council, Cohen ran for Minneapolis mayor and was soundly defeated in the 1969 mayoral election by an independent candidate, Charles Stenvig, despite holding the endorsements of the Democratic-Farmer-Labor Party (DFL), the Republican party, and of President Richard Nixon.

Cohen moved to Washington, D.C., and served as a Special Assistant to the Director of the Peace Corps, Washington D.C. In the 1970s, Cohen served on the Minneapolis Planning Commission for four years. He served again in 2009 and 2012.

While working for Wheelock Whitney, Jr.'s 1982 gubernatorial campaign, Cohen agreed to pass some documents with information about DFL Lieutenant Governor candidate Marlene Johnson's criminal history to reporters of the Minneapolis Star and Tribune and the St. Paul Pioneer Press in exchange for their promises of confidentiality. The newspapers nevertheless exposed Cohen, who lost his job with the campaign and sued Star Tribune owner Cowles Media Company. The trial court found the defendants liable for $200,000 in compensatory damages. The case eventually went before the Supreme Court of the United States in 1991, which decided 5–4 in Cohen v. Cowles Media Co. that the First Amendment did not preclude such a cause of action, but left other issues of state law to the Minnesota courts. The Minnesota Supreme Court then reinstated the damage award in Cohen's favor.

The Star Tribune reported Cohen to be "leading the charge" against conflicts of interest on the Planning Commission. During Cohen's time on the commission, he also supported Plain Language Charter Reform.

Cohen announced his candidacy on June 18, 2013, for Minneapolis Mayor in the 2013 election, and finished in seventh place out of 35 candidates.

Cohen is the author of 20 books, including a biography of Hubert Humphrey, Undefeated: The Life of Hubert H. Humphrey.

Dan Cohen died April 4, 2024, at age 87.

== Personal life ==
Cohen was a horseman for many years, mainly dealing with thoroughbreds and primarily for racing at Canterbury Park. He was on the Board of the Minnesota Thoroughbred Association and served on the Thoroughbred Breeders Fund Allocation Advisory Committee to the Minnesota Racing Commission.
