= Hiawatha (disambiguation) =

Hiawatha (Aionwà:tha or Hayeñhwathaʼ) is a Native American semi-historical figure who was the co-founder of the Haudenosaunee Confederacy.

Hiawatha may also refer to:

== Arts ==
- A fictional character in the epic poem by Henry Wadsworth Longfellow, The Song of Hiawatha
- The Song of Hiawatha (Coleridge-Taylor), a trilogy of cantatas by Samuel Coleridge-Taylor, based on Longfellow's poem; the first part Hiawatha's Wedding Feast is the best known
- Little Hiawatha (a.k.a. Hiawatha), a 1937 animated family comedy short film produced by Walt Disney in the Silly Symphonies series
- Hiawatha (1909 film), an American silent drama film
- Hiawatha (1952 film), a film starring Vince Edwards
- Hiawatha (1913 film), an American silent drama film
- "Hiawatha (A Summer Idyl)", a popular instrumental song written by Neil Moret in 1901
- Hiawatha (sculpture), a 19th-century marble by Augustus Saint-Gaudens
- Hiawatha, a book by Enid Blyton in the Old Thatch series

== Other ==
- Hiawatha (web server), a web server developed by Hugo Leisink since 2002
- Hiawatha Music Festival, an annual traditional, acoustic, American music festival held in Marquette, Michigan, United States
- Hiawatha Seaway Council, a local council of the Boy Scouts of America headquartered in Syracuse, New York, United States

== People ==
- Hiawatha Bray, columnist for The Boston Globe
- Hiawatha Coleridge-Taylor, son of Samuel Coleridge-Taylor
- Hiawatha Estes (1918–2003), California-based architect

== Places ==
=== Australia ===
- Hiawatha, Victoria, a town in the Shire of Wellington

=== Canada ===
- Hiawatha First Nation, Ontario
- Island of Hiawatha, former name of the Toronto Islands, Ontario

=== Greenland ===
- Hiawatha Glacier

=== United States ===
- Hiawatha, Colorado, a place in Moffat County
- Hiawatha, Iowa
- Hiawatha, Kansas
- Hiawatha, Minneapolis, Minnesota
- Hiawatha, Nebraska
- Lake Hiawatha, New Jersey
- Hiawatha, Utah
- Hiawatha, West Virginia
- Hiawatha Island in Tioga County, New York
- Hiawatha Lake in Syracuse, New York
- Lake Hiawatha in Minneapolis, Minnesota
- Hiawatha Township, Michigan
- Hiawatha National Forest in Michigan

== Ships ==
- USS Hiawatha, the name of several ships of the United States Navy
- MV Hiawatha, an 1895 passenger ferry in Toronto, Canada
- Steamboat Hiawatha, an Ocklawaha River passenger steamer on the St. Johns River in Palatka, Florida, United States
- Hiawatha (riverboat), an American paddlewheel river boat

== Transportation routes ==
- Hiawatha (Milwaukee Road trains), a fleet of named passenger trains of the Chicago, Milwaukee, St. Paul and Pacific Railroad in the United States
- Hiawatha (Amtrak train), a descendant of the above

=== Minneapolis, Minnesota ===
- Hiawatha Line, the former name of the METRO Blue Line, a light rail corridor in Minneapolis and neighboring Bloomington
- Hiawatha Avenue, a highway
- Hiawatha LRT Trail, a mixed-use path
- Min Hi Line, a linear park parallel to Minnehaha and Hiawatha Avenues
