= Min Hi Line =

Proposed linear park and shared-use path in Minneapolis

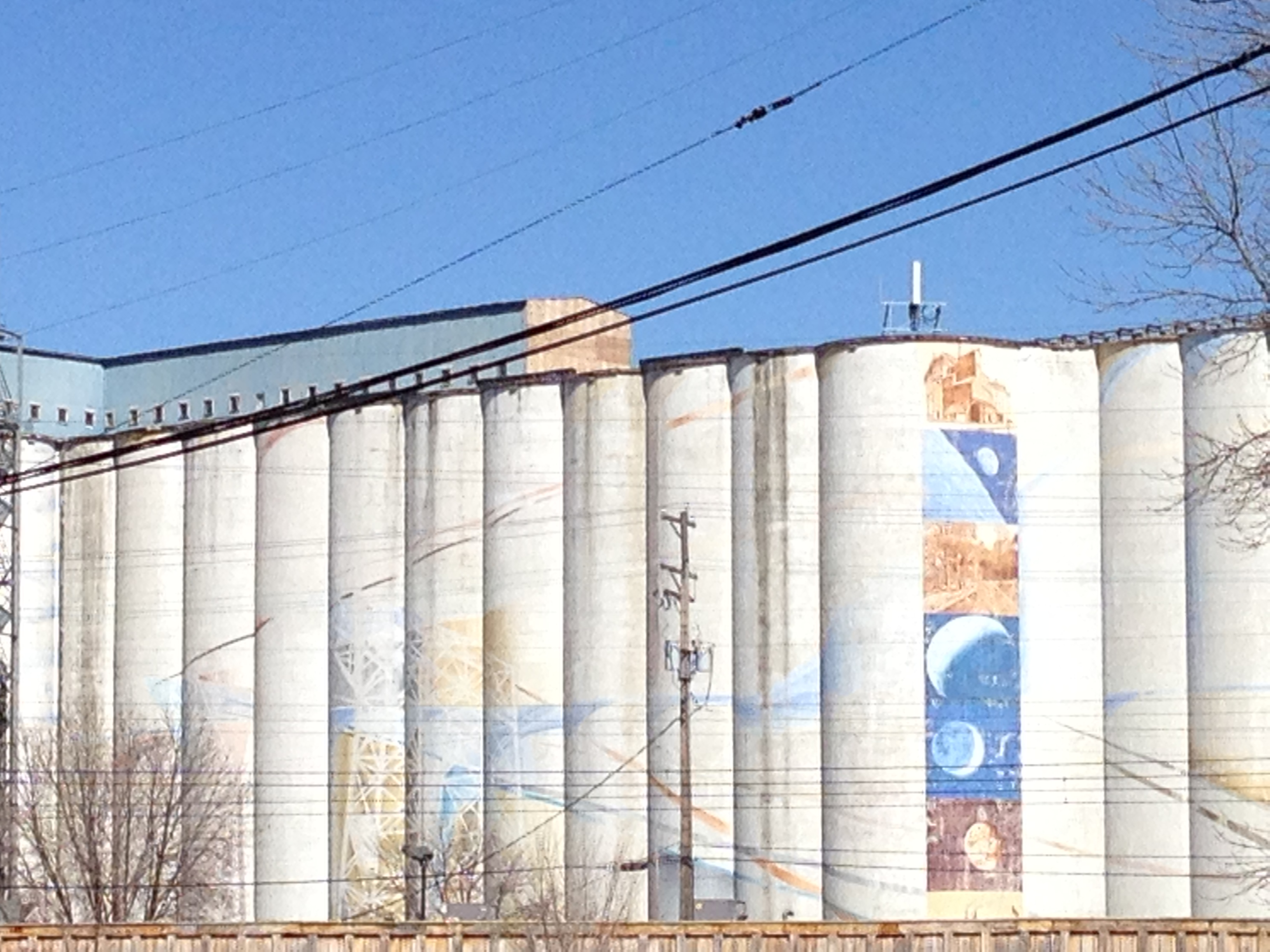
- View of murals on a grain elevator in the Min Hi Line corridor.
- Type: Urban linear park; Shared-use path
- Location: Minneapolis, Minnesota, United States
- Created: 2018
- Operator: City of Minneapolis
- Status: Pilot phase
- Public transit: Metro Blue Line; Metro buses

Min Hi Line is a proposed linear park and shared-use path that would eventually re-purpose an active rail and agri-industrial corridor in the Longfellow community of Minneapolis, Minnesota, United States. Modeled after successful projects like the Atlanta Beltline and New York High Line, it would feature an approximately 3-mile (4.8 km), shared-use pathway that traverses housing, retail, commercial buildings, gardens, playgrounds, and public art installments. Two pilot projects completed in 2018 and 2019 connect the Min Hi Line corridor to trail systems at its northern and southern ends.

== History ==
The proposed area for the Min Hi Line is used by Canadian Pacific Railway, Archer Daniels Midland, Leder Brothers Metal, and General Mills. After Archer Daniel Midland ceases operations in the area, the century-old Atkinson Mill structure at East 38th Street will be the last remaining active grain mill left in the city of Minneapolis. The grain silos and milling structures are a defining feature of the local neighborhood, and could be incorporated into future redevelopment. Long-term city plans envision parks and open space for the freight rail tracks. A community group, Min Hi Line Coalition, has publicized issues related to reuse of the industrial corridor.

=== Pilot projects ===
==== Greenway connection ====
A pathway built in 2019 along the east side of Hiawatha Avenue from East 32nd Street to East 28th Street, though technically part of the Hiawatha LRT Trail, is also referred to as the northernmost segment of the Min Hi Line.

==== Minnehaha Park connection ====
A housing and retail development at East 46th Street and Snelling Avenue is planned to feature a pathway to Nawadaha Boulevard that is considered the south end of the Min Hi Line.

== Route ==
Min Hi Line is named after the Minnehaha-Hiawatha freight rail corridor between Hiawatha Avenue and Snelling Avenue/Cheatham Avenue (formerly Dight Avenue). At its northern end, it reaches the Midtown Greenway, and at its southern end it reaches the Minnehaha Falls park area. The approximately 3-mile (4.8 km) pathway would be at-grade, crossing 12 streets along its north–south course. Trail users could connect to many other shared-use paths in the area, such as Hiawatha LRT Trail, Little Earth Trail, and Grand Rounds trail network. The Min Hi Line corridor features many multi-unit housing complexes and business. The Min Hi Line would contrast with bike highways that are used almost exclusively for transportation and recreation. Designed for more moderately-paced activities, the linear park and pathway would increase social connectedness and green the urban environment.

=== Nearby sites ===
==== Attractions ====
- Hiawatha Avenue Mural on the Harvest States grain elevator by artist Sara Rotholz Weiner.
- Lake Street shopping district
- Minnehaha Mile boutique and vintage shopping district
- Minnehaha Regional Park
- Purple Rain house of "The Kid" historic landmark

==== Neighborhoods ====
- Longfellow community: Cooper, Hiawatha, Howe, and Longfellow
- West of Hiawatha Avenue: Corcoran, Ericsson, and Standish

==== Transportation ====
- Metro Blue Line
  - Lake Street/Midtown Station
  - 38th Street Station
  - 46th Street Station
- Shared-use paths
  - Grand Rounds
  - Hiawatha LRT Trail
  - Little Earth Trail
  - Midtown Greenway
- Streets
  - Hiawatha Avenue
  - Lake Street

== See also ==
- Cycling in Minnesota
- Cycling infrastructure
- Greenway
- List of shared-use paths in Minneapolis
- Metro Transit
- Rail trail
