= Longfellow, Minneapolis =

Community of Minneapolis

Longfellow
- Community
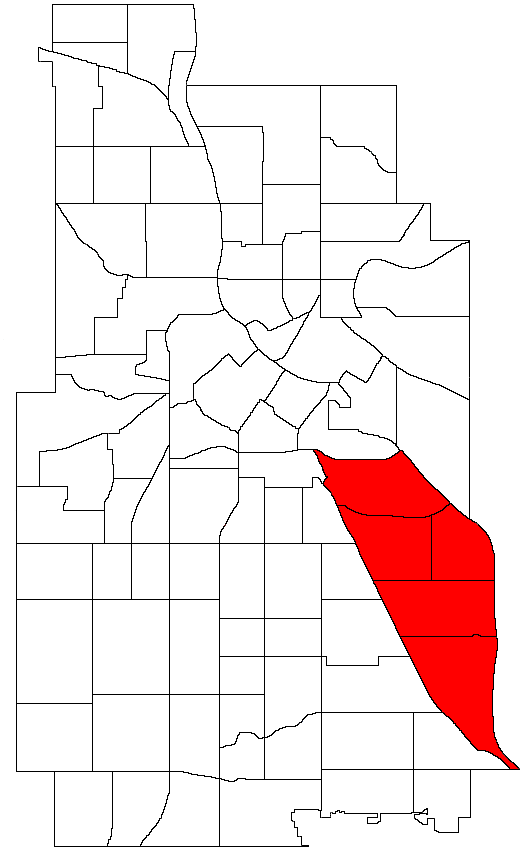
- Location of Longfellow within the U.S. city of Minneapolis
- Interactive map of Longfellow
- Coordinates: 44°56′29″N 93°12′57″W
- Country: United States
- State: Minnesota
- County: Hennepin
- City: Minneapolis
- Named for: The Song of Hiawatha
- City Council Wards: 2, 6, 12
- Neighborhoods: List: Cooper; Hiawatha; Howe; Longfellow

Government
  - Council Member: Robin Wonsley
  - Council Member: Jamal Osman
  - Council Member: Aurin Chowdhury

Area
  - Total: 4.962 sq mi (12.85 km^{2})

Population (2020)
  - Total: 29,295
  - Density: 5,904/sq mi (2,279/km^{2})
- Time zone: UTC-6 (CST)
  - Summer (DST): UTC-5 (CDT)
- ZIP code: 55404, 55406, 55417
- Area code: 612

Historical population
Census	Pop.	Note	%±
1980	28,675		—
1990	28,618		−0.2%
2000	27,776		−2.9%
2010	27,775		0.0%
2020	29,295		5.5%

Longfellow, also referred to as Greater Longfellow, is a defined community in Minneapolis, Minnesota which includes five smaller neighborhoods inside of it: Seward, Cooper, Hiawatha, Howe and Longfellow. The community is a mix of agri-industrial properties along the old Milwaukee Road now Minnesota Commercial Railway, expansive parkland surrounding the famous Minnehaha Falls, and smaller residential areas.

== History ==
The city did not acquire land south of Franklin Avenue until 1881 and 1883, with the last half of Longfellow annexed in 1887 from Richfield. The area was largely built from 1906 through the 1920s when streetcar and residential rail became accessible. Also the advent of ready-to-assemble homes such as Sears Catalog Homes made homeownership accessible to the primarily immigrant population of the city who could not afford the carpentry or craftsmanship to build single-family homes (or mansions) of the era. Most of these early homeowners were first and second generation Scandinavians who moved out from Cedar Riverside. Even by 1930, the south area was still a major immigrant hub compared to the southwest area with a high foreign-born or second generation population.

Longfellow takes its name from Longfellow neighborhood which in turn is named after Henry Wadsworth Longfellow. The renowned American poet incorporated elements into his poem The Song of Hiawatha from Henry Schoolcraft's accounts of native Dakota lore in Minnesota which included Minnehaha Falls in Longfellow's southern tip. The early reference of Highway 55 as Hiawatha Avenue, along the west border, may have influenced the naming decision when community borders were drawn in the 1960s. Hiawatha Avenue is the main thoroughfare leading north into Downtown Minneapolis and south to the Minneapolis-Saint Paul Airport.

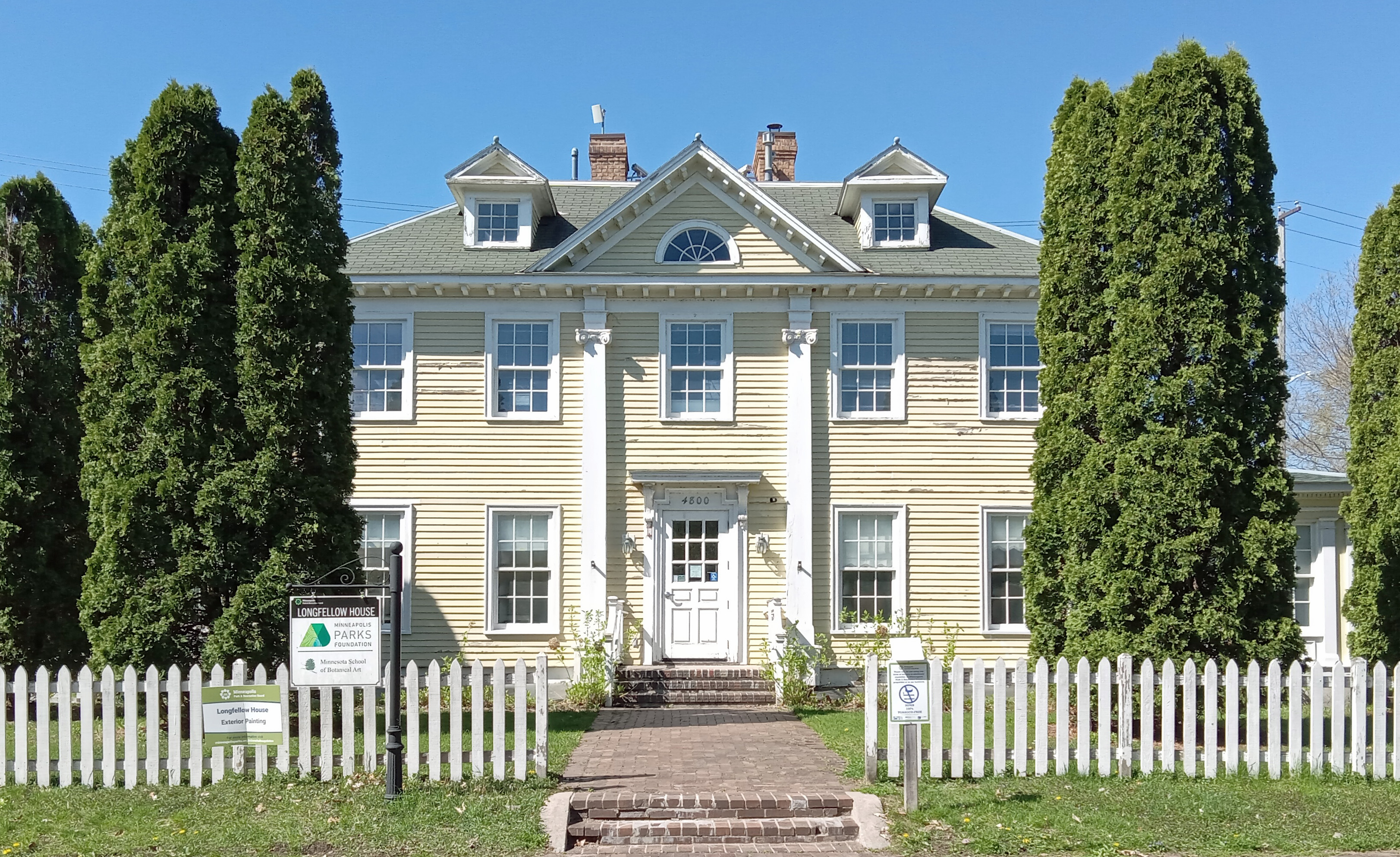
Local businessman Robert F. Jones built his home to resemble a replica of Longfellow's house. Longfellow never lived in it or ever saw it.

Longfellow's popular The Song of Hiawatha spurred national interest in Minnehaha Falls and his name became associated with the area. The poet's name would be further emphasized when the Longfellow House was built in 1906. A local businessman, Robert Fremont "Fish" Jones, commissioned the 2/3 scale replica of Henry Wadsworth Longfellow's original home in Cambridge, Massachusetts. The house was placed as part of the Longfellow Zoological Gardens at 4001 Minnehaha Parkway East, which Jones ran. Jones died in 1934 and the house was deeded to the city. For a short period it was a Minneapolis public library serving the community until it was moved and restored by the Park Board in 1994 to its current location near Minnehaha Falls. It is now an interpretive and information center for the Minneapolis Park System.

An unexplained South Minneapolis phenomenon called the Longfellow Boom, described by residents as "house-shakingly loud" and at lower tone, distinct from a car crash or gunshot, is named after the community.

The community was the center of widespread civil unrest during the George Floyd protests in Minneapolis–Saint Paul in May 2020, with the Minneapolis Police Department's third precinct station and many local businesses among those destroyed by arson.

== Location and characteristics ==
The community is considered part South Minneapolis. It is bounded by the city's eastern border with the Mississippi River to the east, Hiawatha Avenue to the west, Hiawatha Avenue and the Metro Blue Line to the southwest/west, and Interstate 94 to the north. It is primarily located in Ward 12, represented by city council member Aurin Chowdhury. The Seward neighborhood is split between Ward 2 and Ward 6, represented by Robin Wonsley and Jamal Osman, respectively. Most of Greater Longfellow (with the exception of Seward) is represented by the Longfellow Community Council.

Longfellow is home to the Danish American Center, Minnehaha Academy, Christ Church and the Longfellow House. The area is typically recognized by bungalow style Craftsman homes built in the 1920s. It also contains the Ray and Kay Price House, designed by the famed Ralph Rapson, and the Frederick Lang House, designed by Herb Fritz. Minnehaha Falls is a national attraction and an important cultural node of the Twin Cities.

The neighborhood's central corridor runs along 42nd Avenue South and is home to a few small businesses. Along the northern edge runs the Midtown Greenway trail and the vibrant East Lake business district, which is home to many restaurants. The west border was once an agri-industrial and milling processing center served by the Northern Pacific Railway. Today the grain silos and factories along the length of the highway are set to make way for new residential condos, apartment buildings, and a new greenway connecting Minnehaha Falls and the Midtown Greenway. This area is also anchored by the Minnehaha Mile, a biking street that contains more antique, vintage, retro, and secondhand shops than any other commercial corridor in the state of Minnesota

== Attractions ==
Cheatham Avenue is named after John Cheatham, one of the first Black firefighters in Minneapolis.

Hiawatha Avenue Mural on the Harvest States grain elevator was designed by artist Sara Rotholz Weiner. Completed in 1990, it is a defining feature of the neighborhood.

Lock and Dam No. 1 is located on the southern edge of the neighborhood and offers a bird's-eye view of the locking procedure and other topics ranging from barge traffic in the transportation network to the Corps 9-foot channel project.

Min Hi Line is a proposed linear park and shared-use pathway for an active agricultural-industrial rail corridor. Two pilot projects were completed in 2018 and 2019, and many housing and commercial developments line the corridor.

Minnehaha Park is a historic city park on the shores of the Mississippi River that includes picnic areas, trails, sculpture and the 53 foot falls. An old snack shack in the Minnehaha Pavilion is located here.

Minnehaha Recording Company is a recording studio built into a 1939 Phillips 66 Gas Station on Minnehaha Avenue and 45th Street. Founded in 2014, the studio has hosted such artists as Charlie Parr, Chris Mulkey, Communist Daughter, Prof, Krizz Kaliko, Human Impact, Ecid, and Brian Ritchie.

Mississippi National River and Recreation Area provides trails for biking and hiking on along the river and provides access to sandy beaches and viewing points. The area's five-mile (8 km) Winchell Trail along the river's bluff offers a rustic hiking experience in the city.

Purple Rain house of "The Kid" is located on Snelling Avenue. It was used for exterior scenes in the movie. The house, purchased by Prince eight months before his death and owned by his estate, is a popular tourist destination for fans of the movie.

The Metro Blue Line serves Longfellow, running along its western/southwestern border.

Minnehaha Mile is a street containing nine antique, vintage, retro, and secondhand shops, more than any other commercial corridor in the state of Minnesota. East Lake Street is a commercial corridor that hosts a collection of restaurants that serve foods from around the world and unique shopping & business venues.

== Notable residents ==
- Eric Dregni, writer
- Jonathan Goldstein, author and podcaster
- Brynn Arens, singer/songwriter

== Neighborhoods in the Longfellow community ==
- Cooper
- Hiawatha
- Howe
- Longfellow
- Seward
