= Robin Wonsley =

American activist and politician

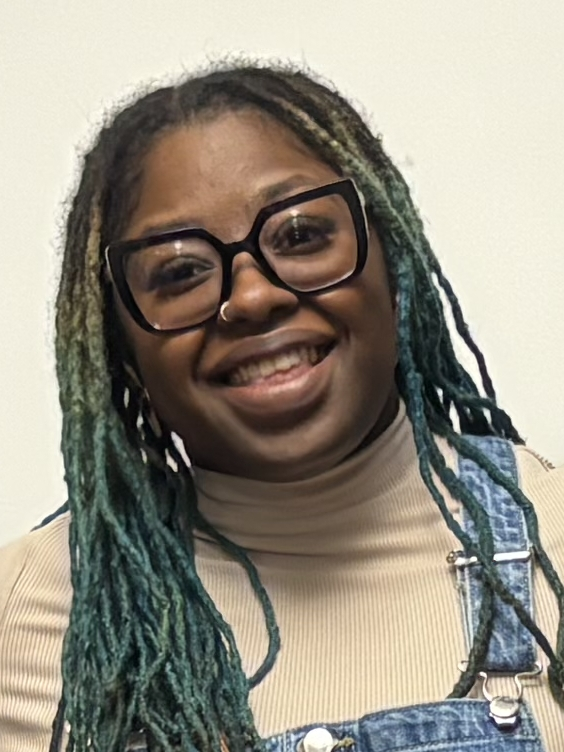
- Wonsley in 2025

Member of the Minneapolis City Council from the 2nd Ward
- Incumbent
- Assumed office January 3, 2022
- Preceded by: Cam Gordon

Minority Leader of the Minneapolis City Council
- Incumbent
- Assumed office January 6, 2026
- Preceded by: Position established

Personal details
- Born: Robin Worlobah Wonsley; 1991 (age 34–35) Chicago, Illinois, U.S.
- Party: Independent
- Other political affiliations: Democratic Socialists of America
- Education: Carleton College; University of St. Thomas (Minnesota)
- Alma mater: University of Minnesota
- Website: Ward 2 - Robin Wonsley

Robin Worlobah Wonsley (born 1991) is an American activist and politician who has been a member of the Minneapolis City Council from the 2nd Ward since 2021. Since 2026, she has also held the title of Minority Leader.

== Early life and education ==
Wonsley was born in Chicago in 1991 and grew up on the South Side. She attended Carleton College as a Posse Foundation Scholar and graduated in 2013 with a B.A. in women’s and gender studies. After graduation, she was awarded a Watson Fellowship that supported her travel to Canada, Australia, South Africa and Ireland, where she studied criminal justice policies and practices. She moved to Minneapolis in 2014 and became the program coordinator for the University of Minnesota Women's Center and a board member for Restorative Justice Community Action.

Wonsley earned a mini MBA in nonprofit management at the University of St. Thomas in 2015 and in 2018 began a Ph.D. program at the University of Minnesota, where she researched housing and racial disparities in the Gender, Women, and Sexuality Studies Department.

== Career ==
After the 2015 killing of Jamar Clark by police officers in Minneapolis, Wonsley became politically active over the next several years, including in the Black Lives Matter movement and Fight for $15 organizing efforts to raise Minneapolis's minimum wage. She joined the Twin Cities chapter of the Democratic Socialists of America in March 2020. In the summer of 2020, she participated in the George Floyd protests. She also became an organizer in the defund the police movement, an effort to reallocate some community resources toward crime prevention services and programs.

=== Minneapolis City Council ===
In 2021, Wonsley became the first Black Democratic Socialist elected to the Minneapolis City Council, defeating 14-year incumbent Cam Gordon, a member of the Green Party of Minnesota. That year, a majority of people of color were elected to the city council for the first time.

Wonsley represents Ward 2, which includes the neighborhoods of Cedar-Riverside, Como, Cooper, Longfellow, Prospect Park, Seward, and the University District. After the election, she identified housing as a major issue for the ward, and rent control as one of her policy priorities. She also advocated the development of policy to address encampments in Minneapolis and the needs of encampment residents, joining four other council members in supporting the development of a rent control policy. In January 2022, she called for evictions from homeless encampments to stop, and was joined at a protest against eviction at the Near North homeless encampment by council members Elliott Payne, Jeremiah Ellison, Jason Chavez, and Aisha Chughtai.

As of January 2026, Wonsley is the council's minority leader. She chairs the Climate and Infrastructure Committee and sits on the Public Health, Safety, and Equity committee.

== Personal life ==
Wonsley resides in Minneapolis's Seward neighborhood.
