= Howe, Minneapolis =

Neighborhood of Longfellow, Minneapolis

Coordinates: 44.9378°N 93.2155°W

Howe
- Neighborhood
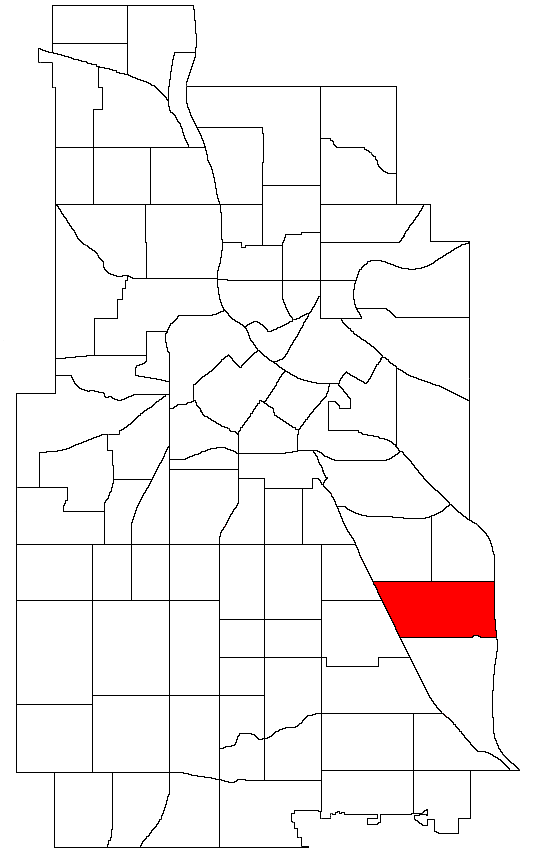
- Location of Howe within the U.S. city of Minneapolis
- Interactive map of Howe
- Country: United States
- State: Minnesota
- County: Hennepin
- City: Minneapolis
- Community: Longfellow
- City Council Ward: 12

Government
  - Council Member: Aurin Chowdhury

Area
  - Total: 1.09 sq mi (2.8 km^{2})

Population (2020)
  - Total: 6,836
  - Density: 6,270/sq mi (2,420/km^{2})
- Time zone: UTC-6 (CST)
  - Summer (DST): UTC-5 (CDT)
- ZIP code: 55406
- Area code: 612

Historical population
Census	Pop.	Note	%±
1980	7,241		—
1990	7,108		−1.8%
2000	6,878		−3.2%
2010	6,608		−3.9%
2020	6,836		3.5%

Howe is a neighborhood within the larger Longfellow community in Minneapolis. It is bordered by the Cooper and Longfellow neighborhoods to the north, Corcoran and Standish to the west, Hiawatha to the south, and the Mississippi River to the east. It is part of City Council Ward 12, represented by Aurin Chowdhury. The neighborhood and its elementary school are named for American writer and abolitionist Julia Ward Howe.

== Demographics ==
Race/ethnicity
Race/ethnicity	2000		2010		2020	
Race/ethnicity	Number	%	Number	%	Number	%
White alone	5,232	76.07	4,882	73.88	4,909	70.79
Black alone	617	8.97	568	8.60	846	12.20
Hispanic or Latino (any race)	436	6.34	553	8.37	503	7.25
Native American alone	180	2.62	178	2.69	96	1.38
Asian alone	165	2.40	159	2.41	170	2.45
Other race alone	13	0.19	10	0.15	18	0.26
Pacific Islander alone	1	0.01	0	0.00	0	0.00
Two or more races	234	3.40	258	3.90	393	5.67
Total	6,878	100.0	6,608	100.0	6,935	100.0

== Notable residents ==
- Sharon Sayles Belton, former Minneapolis Mayor

== See also ==
- Neighborhoods of Minneapolis
- Min Hi Line

== References & External Links ==
- Howe School's website: hiawatha.mpls.k12.mn.us
