= Hiawatha (riverboat) =

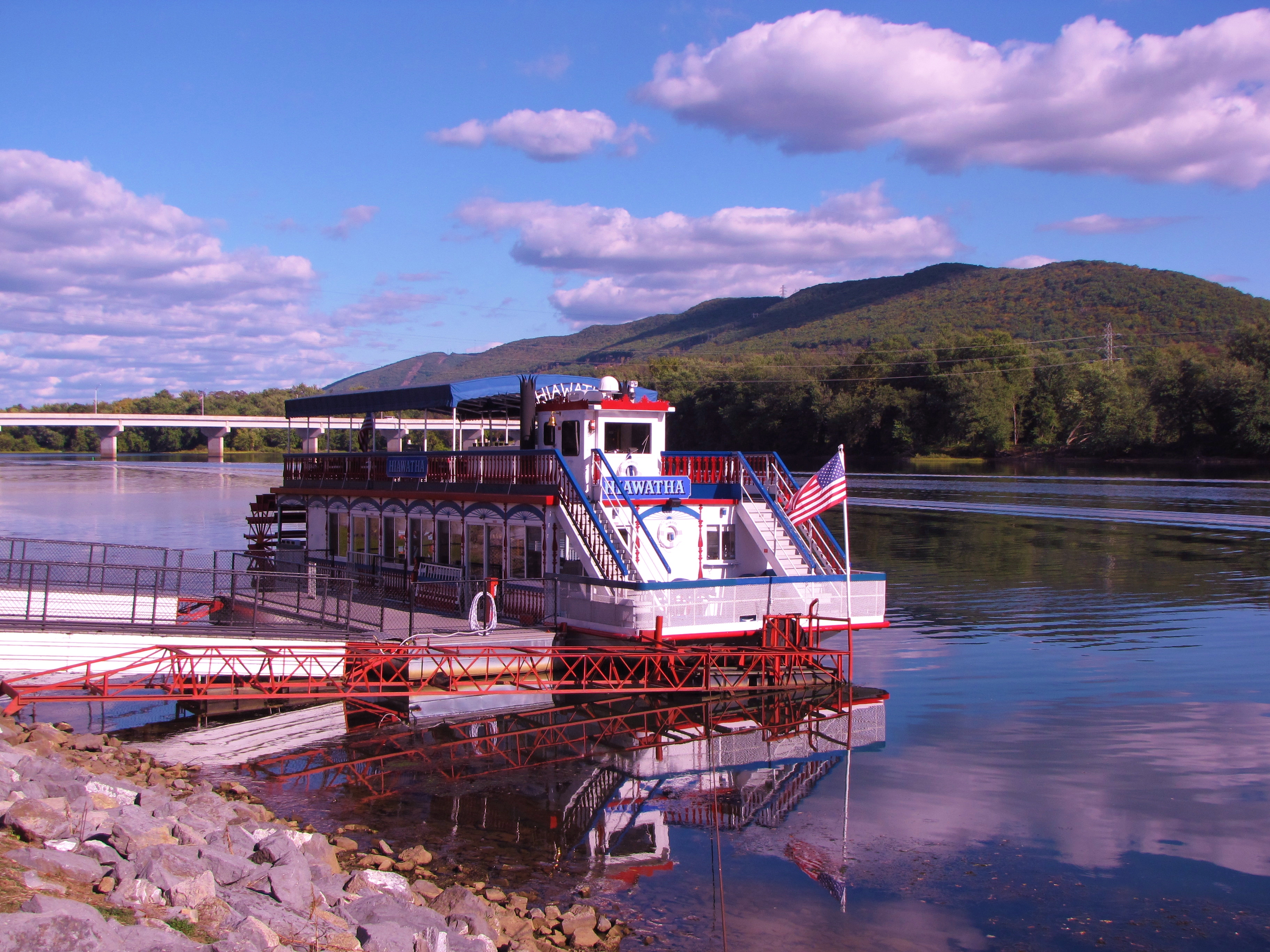
- The Hiawatha in 2013 2024 rates- $15 Adults, $13 Senior and $10 for children. Under 2 are free

History
- Owner: Hiawatha Inc.
- Operator: Hiawatha, Inc.
- Port of registry: Susquehanna State Park, Pennsylvania
- Route: West Branch Susquehanna River
- Launched: 1982

General characteristics
- Type: Paddlewheel
- Length: 78 ft
- Beam: 20ft
- Draught: 4ft
- Decks: 2
- Propulsion: Diesel
- Capacity: 117 (50 on top deck)
- Crew: 3 (Captain, First Mate and Senior Deckhand)

The Hiawatha is an American river boat. She is powered by twin 240-hp diesel engines driving propellers. The paddle wheels do not propel the craft but make it look like a paddle wheeler. The vessel has a maximum capacity of 3 crew members and 117 passengers.

== Title ==
It was named after another paddlewheel riverboat that was destroyed during the spring ice thaw in 1914. That boat was named after an Iroquois Indian chief named Hiawatha who was instrumental in bringing together the Five Nations of the Iroquois Confederacy and lived in Pre-Columbian America.

== Route ==
The vessel is routed in the West Branch Susquehanna River from Williamsport (origin), upstream through Woodward Township, Susquehanna Township to Linden (turn around point) back down stream. This is the usual routing however some cruises can be lengthened, some cruise are known to go as far upstream as Piatt Township when water levels are viable.

The Hiawatha cannot go downstream past Williamsport due to the Williamsport Dam located near the border to Loyalsock Township.
