= Milwaukee Avenue =

Milwaukee Avenue may refer to:

- Milwaukee Avenue (Chicago), Chicago and suburbs, Illinois
- Milwaukee Avenue Historic District, Minneapolis, Minnesota
- Milwaukee Avenue, Lubbock, Texas
