= Longfellow Boom =

Unexplained noise in Minnesota, US

The Longfellow Boom is a loud, unexplained phenomenon reported in the Longfellow community of Minneapolis, Minnesota, United States. The booms reportedly generally take place on summer nights, and residents have called them "house-shakingly loud" and at a low tone, distinct from a car crash or gunshot. Many who have investigated the booms believe they are caused by several types of unrelated human activities, such as fireworks and improvised explosives being lit in the Mississippi River gorge, trains decoupling, and cars backfiring.

== History ==
External videos
- Longfellow Boom recorded on July 23, 2022, at 2:21 a.m. on YouTube (10 seconds)

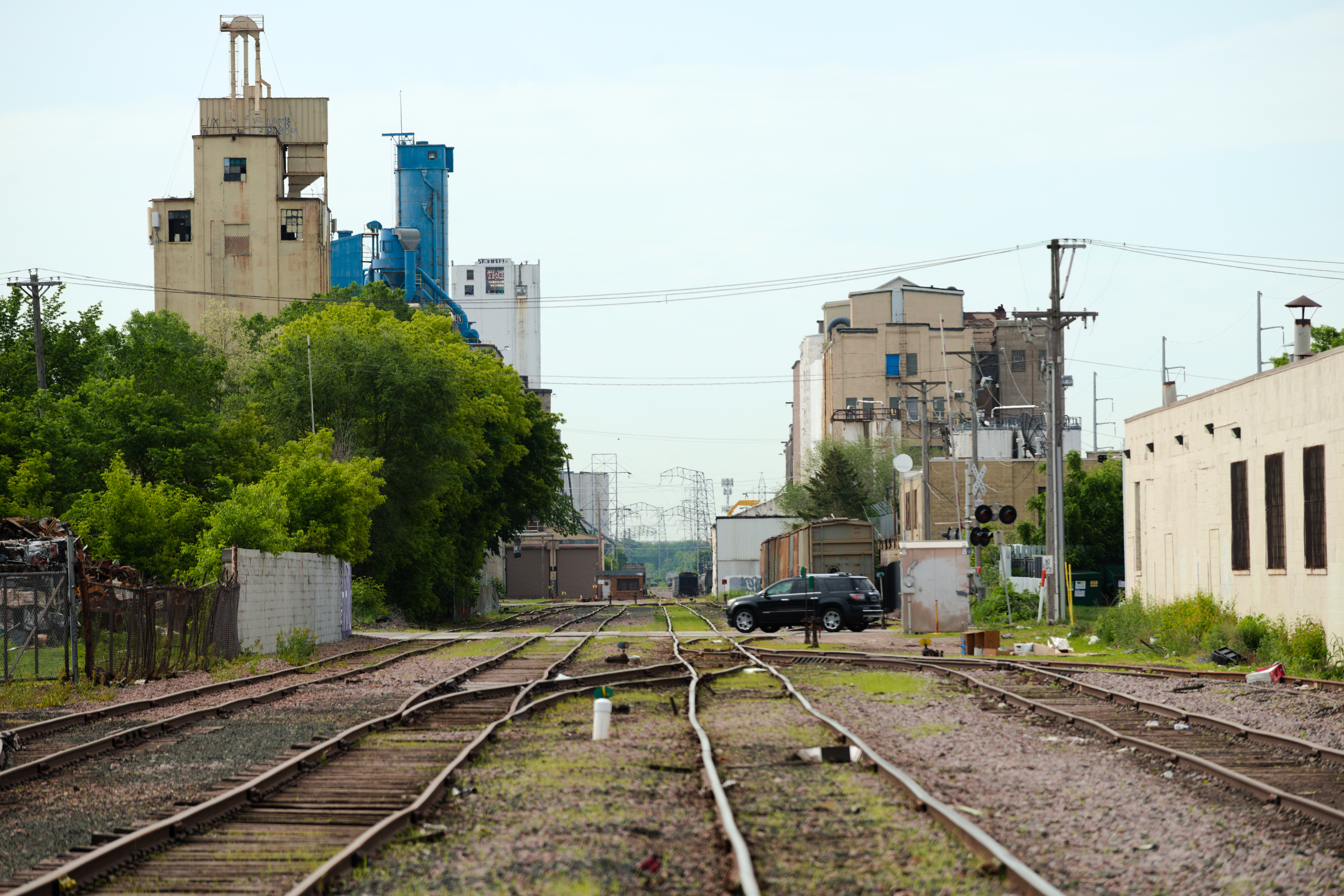
The Hiawatha rail corridor in Longfellow, Minneapolis

The phenomenon has been discussed for several decades. Several explosions in South Minneapolis were reported to Minneapolis Police Department in the mid-2000s. Many were attributed to fireworks, but in 2010, the Third Precinct said that while fireworks and exploding electrical transformers could account for half of the noises, the rest were unexplained. Locals have discussed the phenomenon on internet chat forums and social media.

Many theories have been put forward to explain the phenomenon but none has been confirmed. Explanations include railway coupling, secret NORAD flights, or improvised explosive devices. A discredited theory that drew FBI attention was that anarchists were preparing for an attack on the 2008 Republican National Convention. Sewer issues or a fault line in the Mississippi River have also been posited, as well as extraterrestrial explanations. It has also been suggested that the river causes normal sounds to echo strangely.

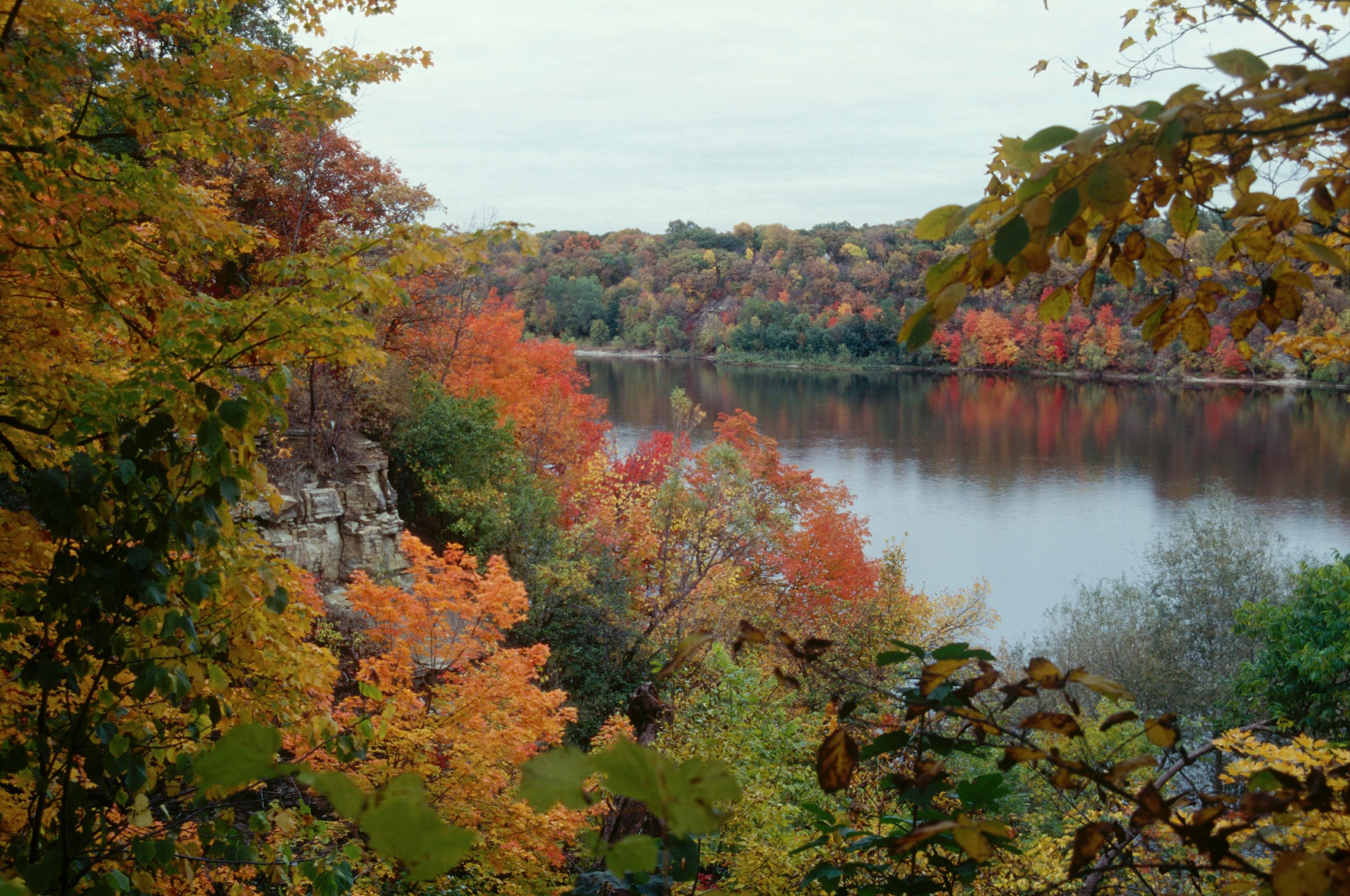
The Mississippi River gorge with Longfellow at left, on the river's west side

Xcel Energy has said it has found no outages or equipment problems that correlate with the booms. A project based at Minneapolis–Saint Paul International Airport using aircraft noise sensors was also unable to find the booms' source. Despite multiple investigations, the Minneapolis Police Department and Minneapolis Health Department have also been unable to identify the cause.

Loud booms have also been reported in the neighboring cities of Saint Paul and Richfield. In 2024, Richfield police officers arrested a driver who they alleged was lighting off mortars from their car, causing loud booms.

In 2026, some Longfellow residents reported the emergence of a mysterious hum sound; it was determined to be coming from industrial fans atop the recently renovated Atkinson grain mill owned by Archer Daniels Midland at East 38th Street and Hiawatha Avenue.

== In popular culture ==
The Boom, a short film by Ajuawak Kapashesit released in 2026, is inspired by the mysterious phenomenon.

== See also ==
- Boom Island Park
- The Hum
