= Seward, Minneapolis =

Neighborhood of Minneapolis

Coordinates: 44.9614°N 93.2313°W

Seward
- Neighborhood
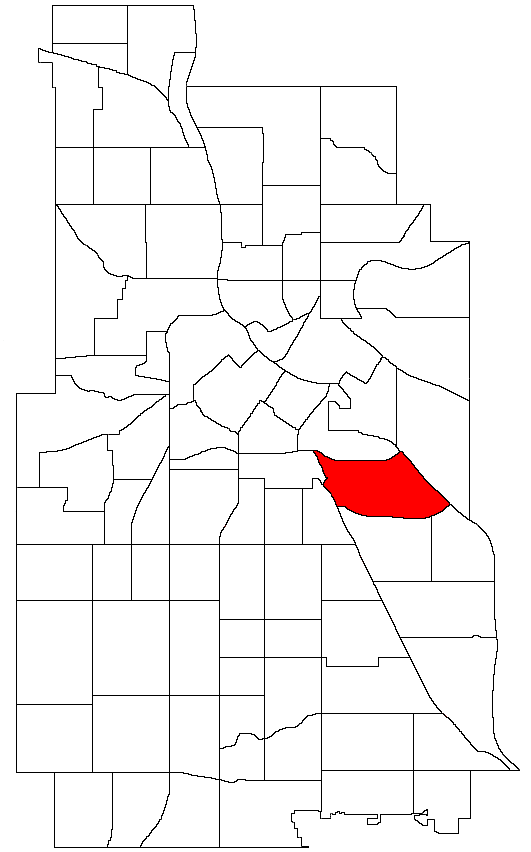
- Location of Seward within the U.S. city of Minneapolis
- Interactive map of Seward
- Country: United States
- State: Minnesota
- County: Hennepin
- City: Minneapolis
- Community: Longfellow
- Named for: William H. Seward
- City Council Wards: 2, 6

Government
  - Council Member: Robin Wonsley
  - Council Member: Jamal Osman

Area
  - Total: 1.039 sq mi (2.69 km^{2})

Population (2020)
  - Total: 7,516
  - Density: 7,234/sq mi (2,793/km^{2})
- Time zone: UTC-6 (CST)
  - Summer (DST): UTC-5 (CDT)
- ZIP code: 55404, 55406
- Area code: 612

Seward is a neighborhood in the Longfellow community of Minneapolis, Minnesota, located geographically southeast of downtown. It consists of the land bordered by the Hiawatha Avenue industrial district to the west, Minneapolis Midtown Greenway (between E. 27th St. and E. 28th St.) to the south, the Mississippi River to the east, and Interstate 94 to the north.

Seward's bordering neighborhoods are Cooper to the southeast, Longfellow to the south, East Phillips to the southwest, Ventura Village to the west, Cedar-Riverside to the north, and Prospect Park/East River Road across the Mississippi River to the east. Seward was named after former New York senator, governor, and US Secretary of State William H. Seward.

The neighborhood includes a number of local businesses along Franklin Avenue including two cooperatives, Seward Co-op (a grocery store) and Seward Community Cafe. The neighborhood is also home to the Milwaukee Avenue Historic District, Northern Clay Center, ArtiCulture and The Playwrights' Center.

== Civic information ==
Seward is split between City Council Wards 2 and 6, represented by Robin Wonsley and Jamal Osman respectively. Politically, Seward is progressive-left, with the Democratic-Farmer-Labor Party and Green Party having political dominance. The Seward Neighborhood Group is the area's neighborhood organization.

== Schools ==
Seward Montessori School, a public magnet school using the Montessori method to teach pre-K to grade 5, is located in Seward. Attached to the school is Matthews Park and Recreation Center. Anne Sullivan Communication Center (emphasizing programs for the deaf and visually impaired) is located just across the Midtown Greenway in the Longfellow neighborhood. Students from Seward Neighborhood can walk to both these schools. The neighborhood resides in the official service area for Dowling Elementary School, Andersen United Middle School, and South High School.

== Demographics ==
Historical population
Census	Pop.	Note	%±
1980	6,791		—
1990	7,020		3.4%
2000	7,174		2.2%
2010	7,308		1.9%
2020	7,516		2.8%

The population of Seward in the 2010 U.S. census was 7,308. Median household income in 1999 was $30,209 and it was $71,004 in 2022. Approximately 18 percent of the population lived below poverty level in 1999, including 13 percent of families. The median house value in 2000 was $112,000.

Race/ethnicity
Race/ethnicity	2000		2010		2020	
Race/ethnicity	Number	%	Number	%	Number	%
White alone	4,587	63.94	4,027	55.10	3,571	47.51
Black alone	1,430	19.93	2,428	33.22	2,980	39.65
Hispanic or Latino (any race)	213	2.97	260	3.56	302	4.02
Native American alone	149	2.08	121	1.66	93	1.24
Asian alone	298	4.15	266	3.64	208	2.77
Other race alone	29	0.40	12	0.16	22	0.29
Pacific Islander alone	7	0.10	5	0.07	4	0.05
Two or more races	461	6.43	189	2.59	336	4.47
Total	7,174	100.0	7,308	100.0	7,516	100.0

== See also ==
- Neighborhoods of Minneapolis
