= Hiawatha, West Virginia =

- Unincorporated community
- Location within the state of West Virginia Hiawatha, West Virginia (the United States)
- Coordinates: 37°26′24″N 81°14′38″W
- Country: United States
- State: West Virginia
- County: Mercer
- Elevation: 2,402 ft (732 m)
- Time zone: UTC-5 (Eastern (EST))
  - Summer (DST): UTC-4 (EDT)
- ZIP code: 24729
- Area codes: 304 & 681
- GNIS feature ID: 1554693

Hiawatha is an unincorporated community in Mercer County, West Virginia, United States. Hiawatha is located along West Virginia Route 10, 1.5 miles (2.4 km) north of Matoaka. Hiawatha had a post office with ZIP code 24729.

The community was named after Hiawatha, cofounder of the Haudenosaunee confederacy.
