= Williamsport Dam =

Coordinates: 41°14′01″N 77°00′18″W

Hepburn Street Dam (Williamsport Dam)
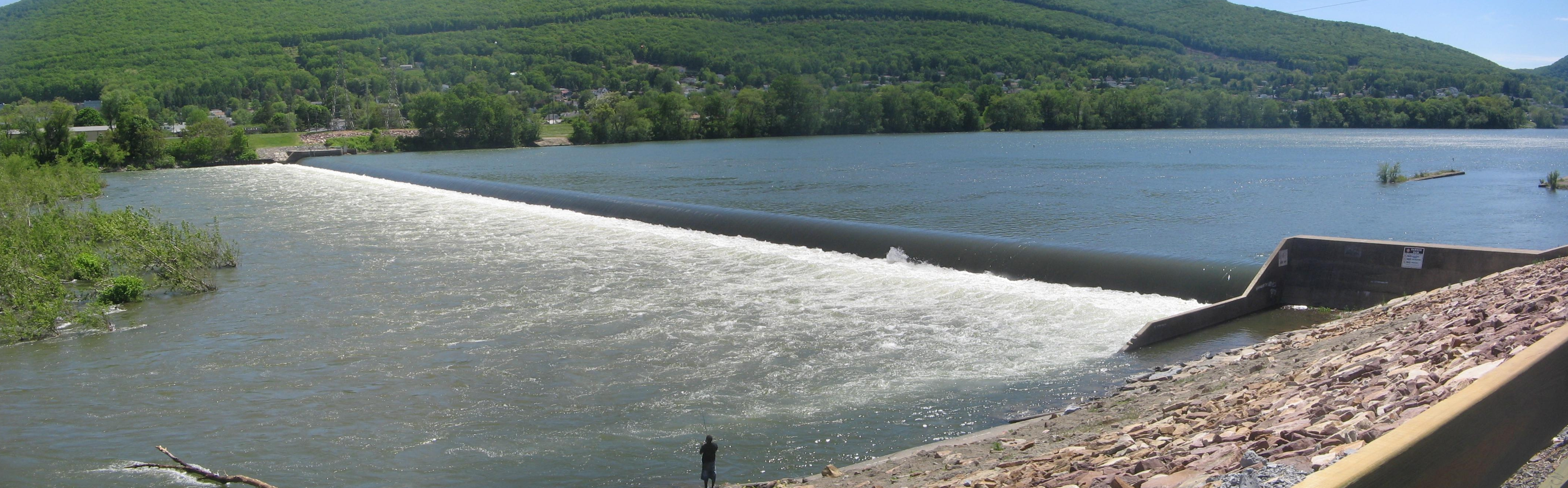
- Hepburn Street dam as seen from the Williamsport side

- Location within Pennsylvania Location within the United States
- Official name: Hepburn Street Dam
- Country: United States
- Location: Williamsport, Pennsylvania
- Status: Operational
- Construction began: 1984
- Opening date: 1986
- Construction cost: $11.9 million (2016 Dollars)
- Owner: Pennsylvania State Government
- Operator: Williamsport Water Authority / Pennsylvania Fish and Boat Commission

Dam and spillways
- Type of dam: Low head
- Impounds: West Branch Susquehanna River
- Height (foundation): 7 feet (2.1 m)
- Length: 1,015 feet (309 m)

The Williamsport Dam, officially known as the Hepburn Street Dam, is a low-head dam on the West Branch Susquehanna River in Williamsport, Pennsylvania. The first dam at this site was built in the 1800s. Ground was broken for the current structure in 1984, and it was finished in the spring of 1986. It was built for recreation, such as boating, watersports and fishing. It has been described as a "killer dam" and a "drowning machine".

== Background ==
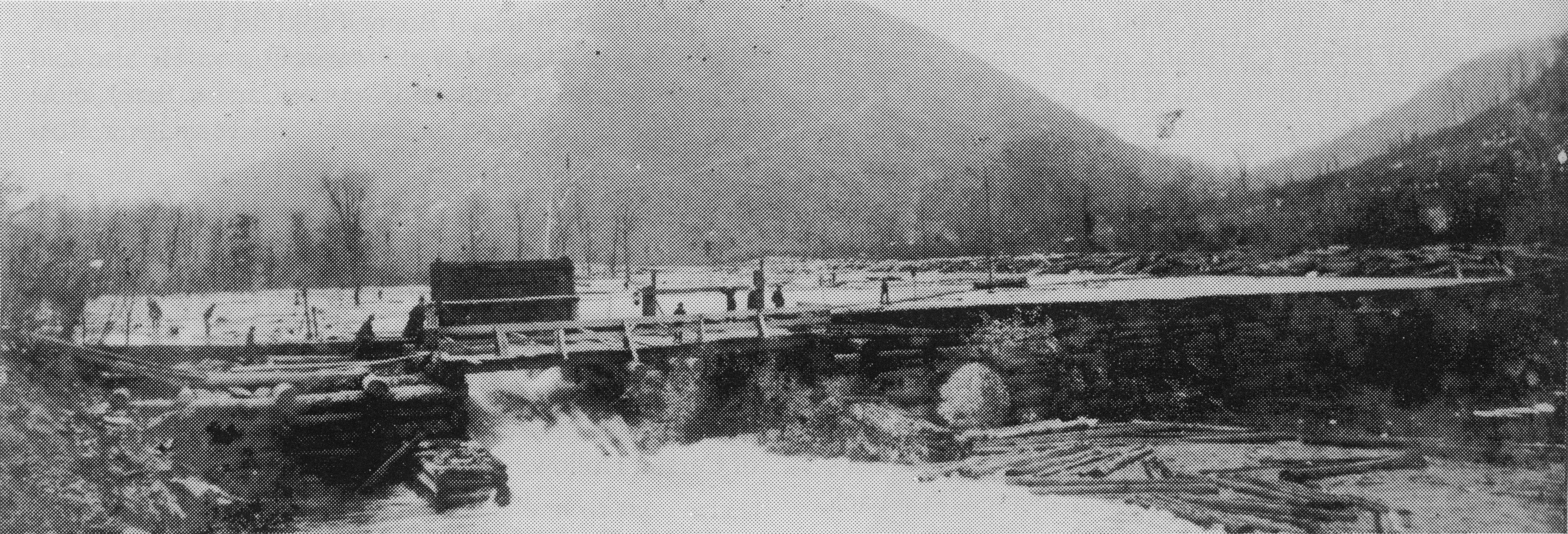
Dam in 1911

The old Hepburn Street Dam (pre-1984) was made of wooden timber cribs filled with rock with a 4-inch thick wooden apron on the downstream side. The new dam, constructed in 1984–1986, was built for recreation. Before the dam was built, the average depth of the West Branch Susquehanna River was 4.6 feet, with its deepest parts being just under 10 feet deep. Some places were impassable by boat, being only a couple of feet or a few inches deep. Since the construction of the new dam, the average depth of the West Branch Susquehanna is 8.3 feet, with some depths of over 20 feet.

Low head dams like this one are known as "drowning machines" or "killer dams" due to their aggressive churning nature. Recirculating currents below the dam will easily trap and drown a person. At least 30 confirmed deaths have occurred at a similar low-head dam on the same waterway about 90 miles downstream in Harrisburg.

== Incidents ==
On Friday April 4, 1958, Fish Warden Raymond Schroll drowned while attempting to rescue a fellow officer after their boat capsized in the sluice at dam. Both officers were thrown into the water and Warden Schroll swam to shore. As he exited the water, he turned and saw that his partner was still clinging to the boat. He dove back into the water in an attempt to rescue the officer but was pulled under and disappeared. His partner was rescued approximately one mile downstream after clinging to the boat for over one hour. Warden Scholl's body wasn't recovered until April 28, 1958, 30 miles downstream of where he went under.

On March 16, 1991, 28 year old Jeffrey Wayne Biechy was swept into the dam after his boat capsized and sank upstream. His body was recovered 24 days later on April 9 about half a mile downstream from the dam.

On Friday July 30, 2016, 55 year old Crist Stouffer jumped from the fish ladder on the south side of the river. He was swept into the dam and then downstream. After being rescued by South Williamsport Police, CPR was performed and he was transported to the hospital but he did not survive.

On May 4, 2025, 10 year old Claue Schreffler-Algofera was playing in the river with her two siblings just upstream from the dam when she was pulled in by the current. Her mother attempted to rescue her and both went over the dam. The mother miraculously escaped the boil and made it to shore with the help of South Williamsport police. After a thorough two-day rescue effort, search and rescue operations were suspended. In addition to local fire and water rescue teams, units from as far away as Elk, Dauphin and Cumberland Counties and various state agencies were involved in the search with no avail. On May 17th, 2025 her body was discovered near Northumberland, Pennsylvania approximately 39 miles down stream from where she went in.

On May 17, 2025, witnesses saw 37 year old Tyler Lance jump off the diversion wall into the dam. His body was spotted a short time later by a Life Flight helicopter floating face-down in the water just a few hundred yards down stream. He did not survive.

== Hydroelectric proposal ==
Ever since the dam was rebuilt and updated Williamsport and county officials expressed interest in converting the low-head dam into a hydroelectric dam. Multiple companies have expressed interest in converting the dam in the past, however none have released a feasible plan to generate electricity there.

== Fish ladder ==
The Hepburn Street Dam has a fish ladder located on the South Williamsport side of the dam. In 2014 the fish ladder was rebuilt—it was widened because sticks and debris were becoming stuck in the ladder, and more lanes were added so that more fish would be able to use the ladder. Originally, the dam did not have a fish ladder; it was added in the early to late 1990s as a result of pressure on local officials to add the ladder for American shad.
