= Hiawatha, Minneapolis =

Neighborhood of Longfellow, Minneapolis

Hiawatha
- Neighborhood
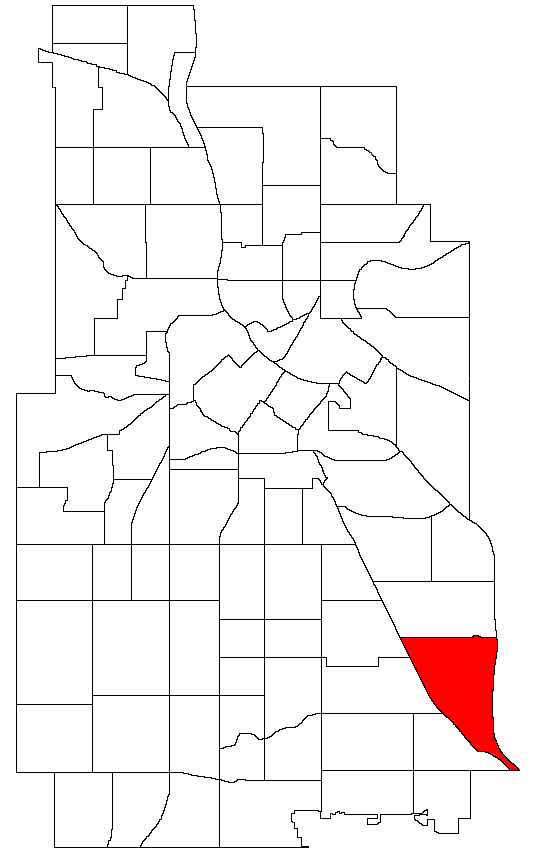
- Location of Hiawatha within the U.S. city of Minneapolis
- Interactive map of Hiawatha
- Country: United States
- State: Minnesota
- County: Hennepin
- City: Minneapolis
- Community: Longfellow
- City Council Ward: 12

Government
  - Council Member: Aurin Chowdhury

Area
  - Total: 1.316 sq mi (3.41 km^{2})

Population (2020)
  - Total: 6,298
  - Density: 4,786/sq mi (1,848/km^{2})
- Time zone: UTC-6 (CST)
  - Summer (DST): UTC-5 (CDT)
- ZIP code: 55406, 55417
- Area code: 612

Historical population
Census	Pop.	Note	%±
1980	5,627		—
1990	5,759		2.3%
2000	5,304		−7.9%
2010	5,461		3.0%
2020	6,298		15.3%

Hiawatha is a neighborhood within the larger Longfellow community in Minneapolis. It is bordered by 40th Street to the north, the Mississippi River to the east, 54th Street East to the south, and Hiawatha Avenue to the west. Its neighbors are Howe to the north, the Mississippi River to the east, Minnehaha Park and the Minnehaha neighborhood to the south, and Ericsson and Standish to the west.

Hiawatha is in City Council Ward 12, represented by Aurin Chowdhury.

== Demographics ==
Race/ethnicity
Race/ethnicity	2000		2010		2020	
Race/ethnicity	Number	%	Number	%	Number	%
White alone	4,200	84.81	4,513	82.64	4,876	78.10
Black alone	263	5.31	305	5.59	409	6.55
Hispanic or Latino (any race)	168	3.39	283	5.18	418	6.70
Native American alone	94	1.90	76	1.39	65	1.04
Asian alone	95	1.92	125	2.29	154	2.47
Other race alone	8	0.16	9	0.16	17	0.27
Pacific Islander alone	1	0.02	1	0.02	1	0.02
Two or more races	123	2.48	149	2.73	303	4.85
Total	4,952	100.0	5,461	100.0	6,243	100.0

== Landmarks and amenities ==
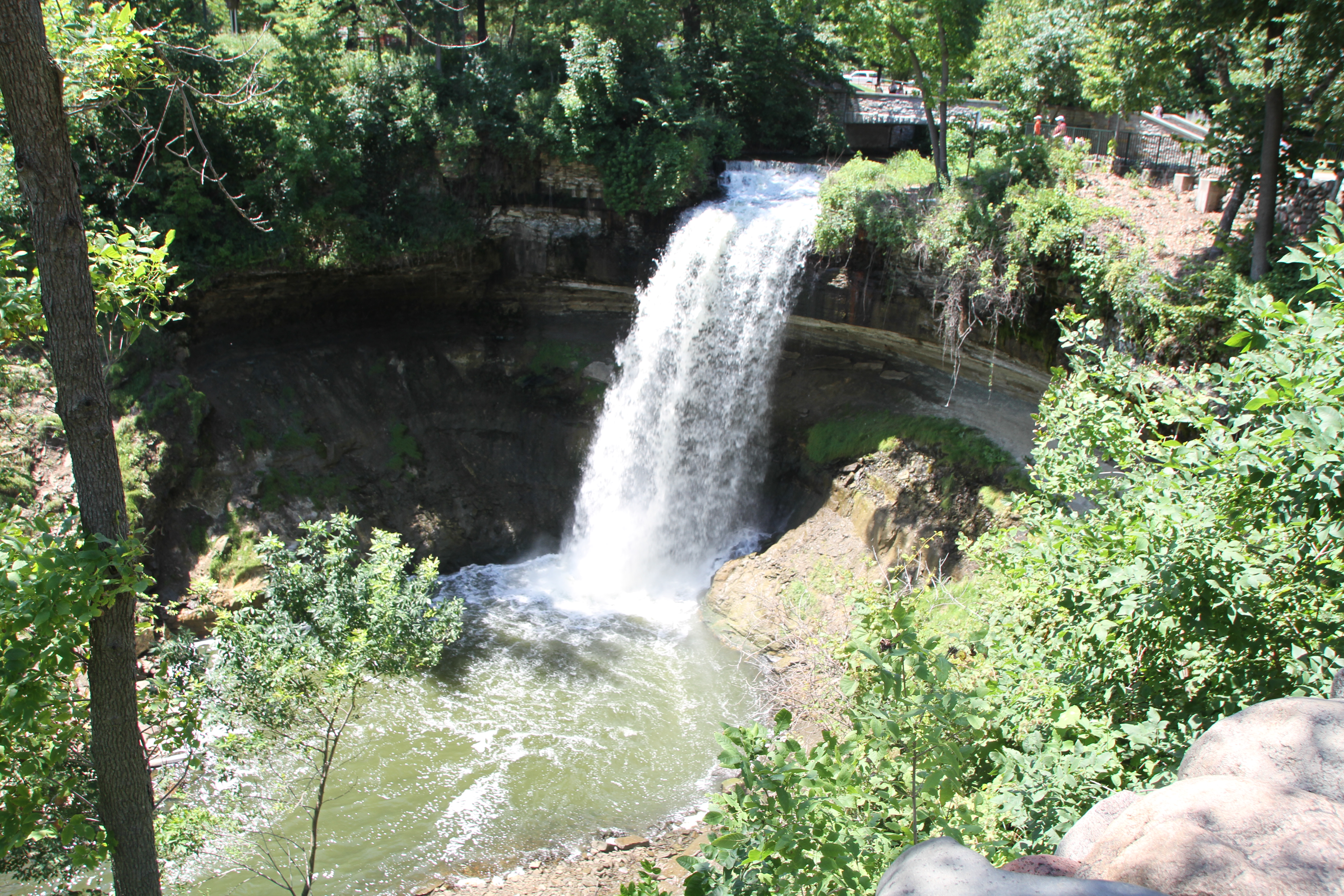
Minnehaha Falls, located in Hiawatha along the Mississippi River

Significant locations in Hiawatha include:

- Minnehaha Regional Park, a MPRB property featuring Minnehaha Falls, the restaurant Sea Salt, and the Minnehaha Dog Park, designated as the Minnehaha Historic District
- Hiawatha Elementary School, a K-2 public school
- Minnehaha Academy, a private college preparatory school, has their elementary and middle school campus on 42nd Street and West River Parkway.
- John H. Stevens House on 4901 Minnehaha Avenue
- The 46th Street Station and the 50th/Minnehaha Station on the Metro Blue Line
- The Hiawatha Avenue Mural, designed by Sara Rotholz Weiner to be painted on a grain elevator at the corner of Hiawatha Avenue and East 41st Street

Hiawatha Avenue Mural
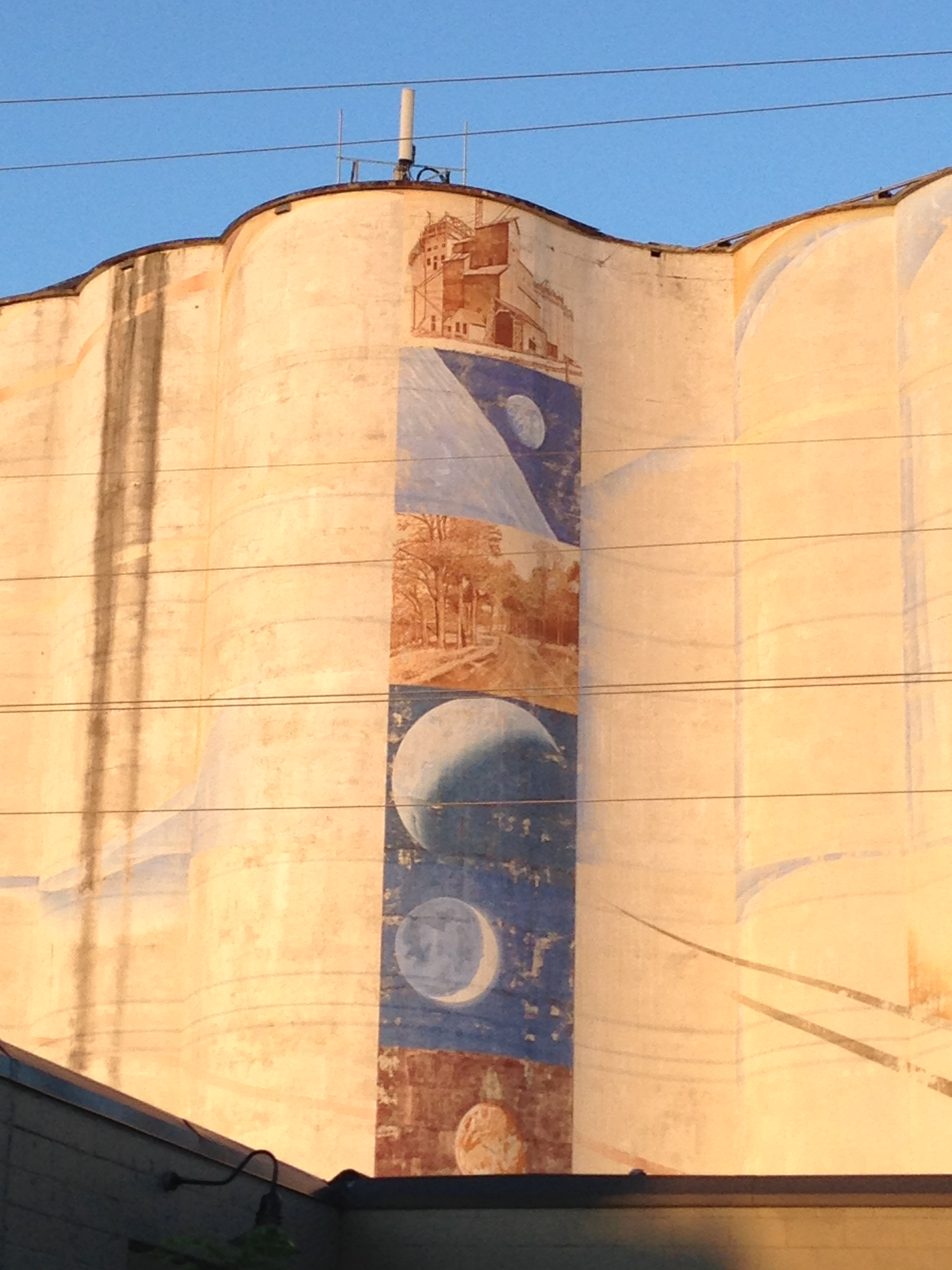
- Artist: Sara Rotholz Weiner
- Year: 1990-1992
- Type: Mural
- Location: Minneapolis; 44.92797°N 93.22311°W
