= Hiawatha, Nebraska =

Coordinates: 40.3295°N 101.6538°W

Hiawatha is a ghost town in Dundy County, Nebraska, United States.

== History ==
A post office was established at Hiawatha in 1889, and remained in operation until it was discontinued in 1933. The town was likely named after The Song of Hiawatha by Henry Wadsworth Longfellow. The town's name was originally "Neel" but was changed in 1889.
