= Minnehaha Academy =

Private school in Minneapolis, Minnesota, US

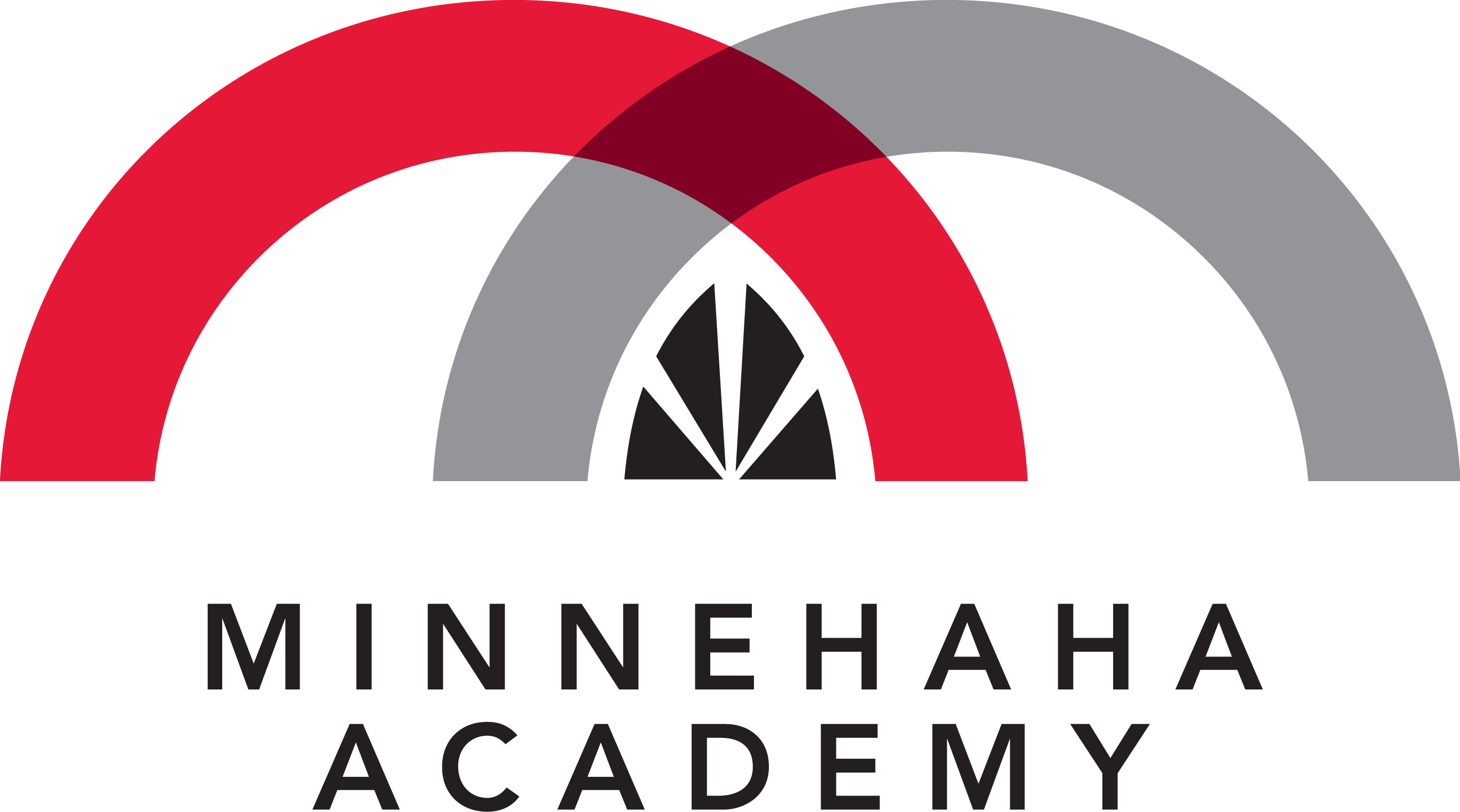

Location
- Upper School; 3100 West River Parkway; Middle and Lower School; 4200 West River Parkway; Minneapolis, Minnesota 55406; United States; 44°56′45″N 93°12′20″W

Information
- Type: Private, day
- Motto: "Where Youth Meets Truth"
- Religious affiliation: Evangelical Covenant Church
- Established: 1913
- President: Donna M. Harris
- Principal: Karen Balmer (Lower School), Jason Wenschlag (Middle School), and Mike DiNardo (Upper School)
- Faculty: 88
- Enrollment: 832
- Student to teacher ratio: 12
- Campuses: Urban
- Colors: Red, White, and Black
- Athletics conference: Independent Metro Athletic Conference
- Mascot: Redhawks
- Website: www.minnehahaacademy.net

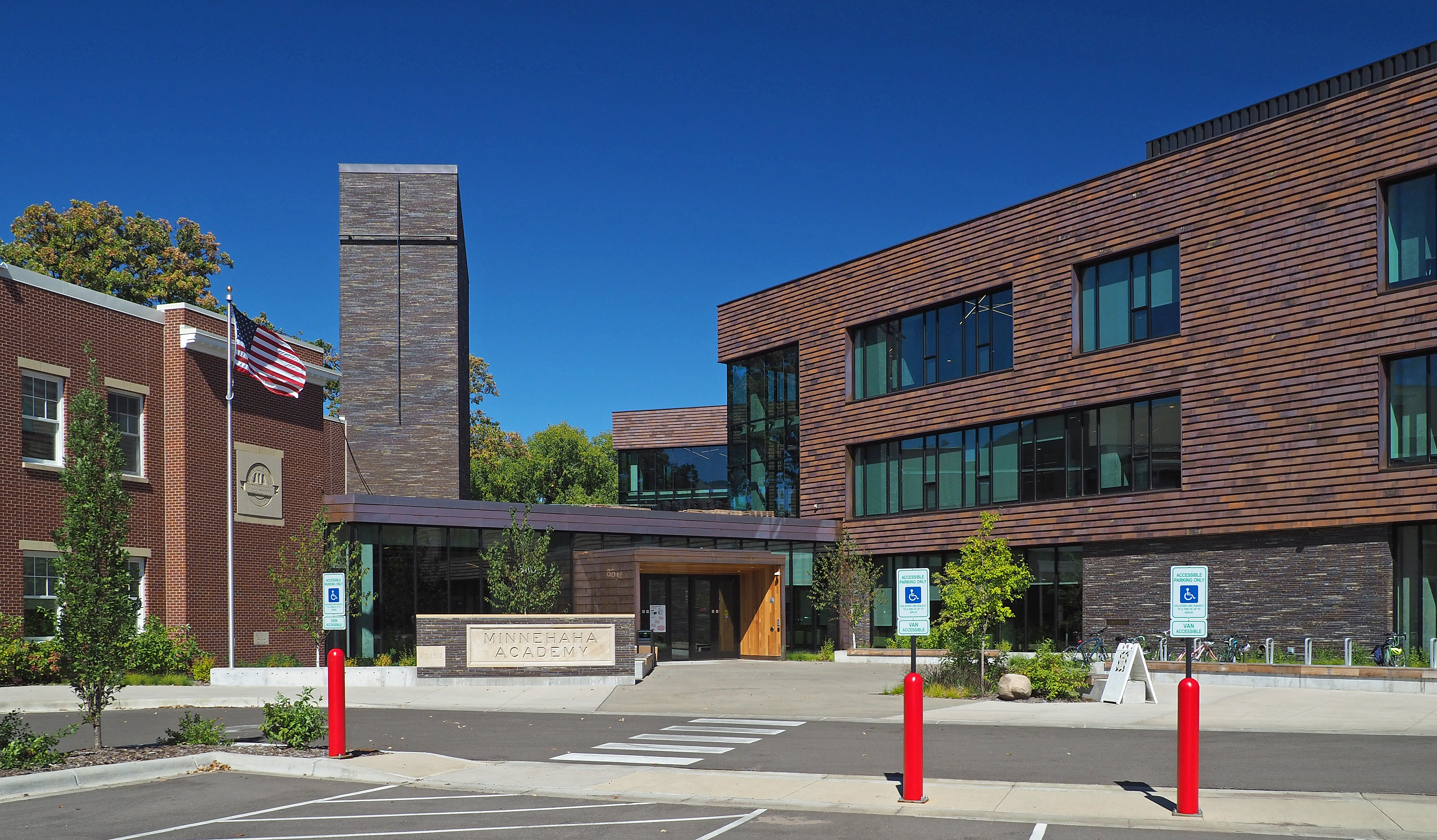
North Campus

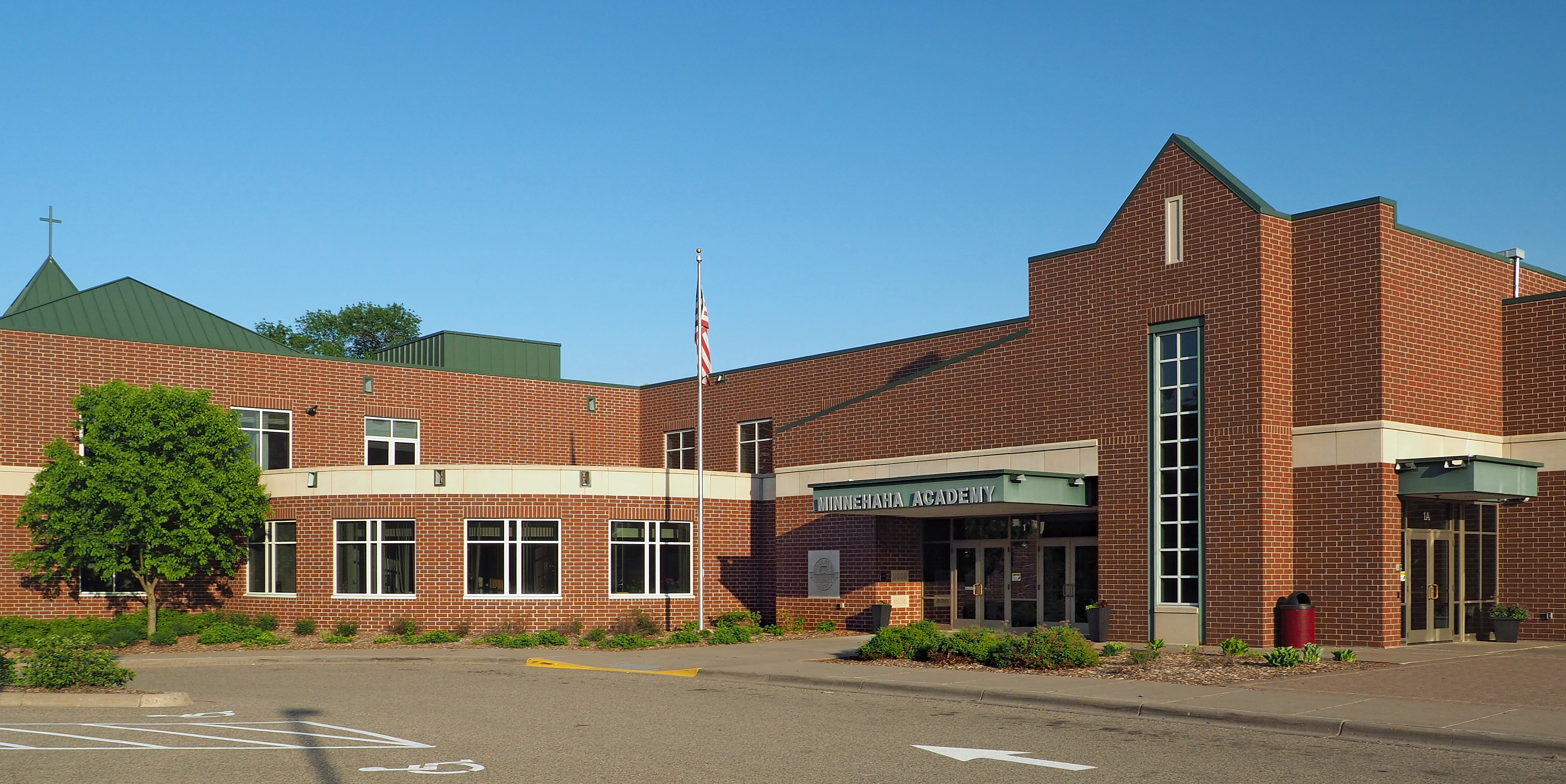
South Campus

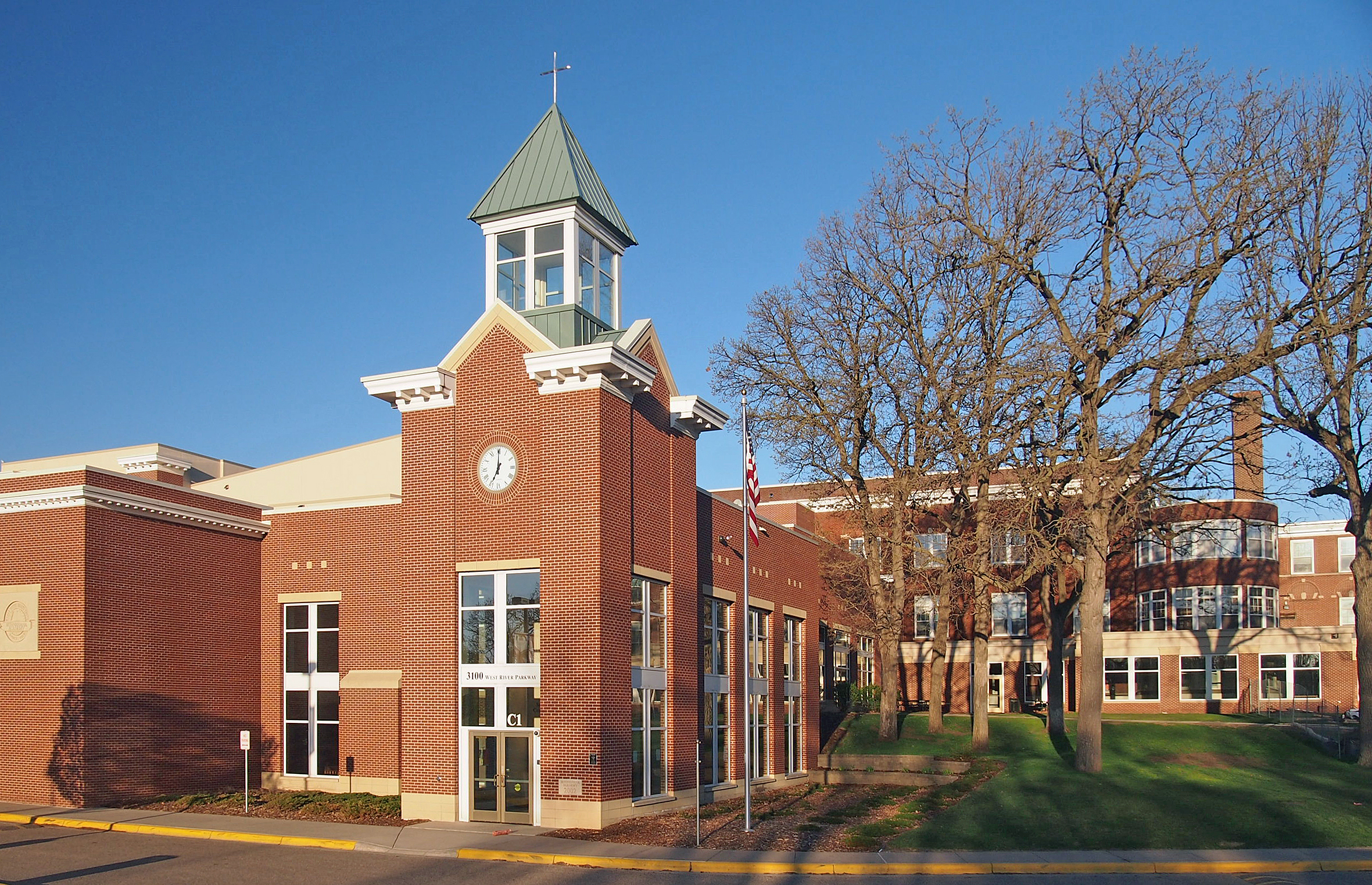
The North Campus before it was destroyed by a 2017 gas explosion

Minnehaha Academy (often abbreviated MA) is a Christian private school in Minneapolis, Minnesota, United States, for students in preschool through 12th grade, and established in 1913. There are two campuses, the South Campus for preschool through 8th graders, and the North Campus, for 9th through 12th graders. It is a ministry of the Northwest Conference of the Evangelical Covenant Church, and is located in the Cooper and Hiawatha neighborhoods on West River Parkway. The student body is drawn from Minneapolis, St. Paul, and throughout the Minneapolis–Saint Paul metropolitan area, as well as several international students.

== History ==
In 1884, Rev. Erik August Skogsbergh had a vision for education that inspired Minnehaha Academy. He believed in the importance of quality education with Christian faith as its center. The original incorporation from 1905 stated: "The purpose of this institution shall be to furnish young men and women with the essential elements of a liberal education, and to foster the development of character under the personal influence of Christian teachers." In 1911, Rev. Skogsbergh and Andrew L. Skoog gathered a group of 11, called the Core of Collectors, who were to raise $100 each toward a new building on the campus. The goal was $25,000, and they exceeded that figure and broke ground on June 30, 1912. On Monday, September 15, 1913, Minnehaha Academy welcomed its first class of high school students.

Since 1913, Minnehaha has been located in Minneapolis, Minnesota, on the banks of the Mississippi River. Minnehaha was a high school serving grades 9–12 until 1972, when grades 7 and 8 were added. In 1981, the South Campus was purchased from Breck School and a chapel was added.

The Middle School was established with the addition of grade 6. The Lower School, grades 1–5, started in 1982. Kindergarten was added in 1985, and then preschool in 1995. The following year, Minnehaha expanded to another campus in Bloomington for preschool through grade 5. The new Athletic Center at North Campus was dedicated in 2002, and the new Chapel and Fine Arts Center in 2003. Renovation of the South Campus (lower and middle school) was completed in 2008. In the Spring of 2011, Minnehaha Academy consolidated its Bloomington Lower School Campus with its Lower School in Minneapolis.

In February, 2017, the north campus of the Upper School had to close for three days as a result of a norovirus outbreak.

On Wednesday, August 2, 2017, at around 10:23 a.m., the west-central portion of the Upper School exploded from a natural gas leak while construction crews were working to move a gas meter. Two staff members died, and nine people were injured, one critically. The high school opened in temporary quarters in Mendota Heights for the 2017–18 and 2018–19 school years. Demolition began in December 2017, and reconstruction of the new structure on that same site was completed in time for the 2019–20 school year.

== Athletics ==
Minnehaha Academy is a member of the Independent Metro Athletic Conference. The school colors are red and white. Since 1990 the teams have been called the Redhawks, with the only exceptions being for some of the co-op teams. The following MSHSL sanctioned sports are offered:

- Alpine Skiing (boys' and girls')
- Baseball (boys')
  - State champions 2016, 2017
- Basketball (boys' and girls')
  - Boys' state champions 2013, 2017, 2018
  - Girls' state champions 2011 2019
- Cross Country (boys' and girls')
- Football (boys)
  - co-op team with the Blake School and St. Paul Academy and Summit School, renamed Wolfpack
- Golf (boys' and girls')
- Hockey (boys' and girls')
- Lacrosse (boys' and girls')
- Nordic Skiing (boys' and girls')
- Soccer (boys' and girls')
- Softball (girls')
- Swimming and Diving (girls')
- Tennis (boys' and girls')
- Track and Field (boys' and girls')
  - Boys state champions 2014
- Volleyball (girls')
- Wrestling (boys')

== Notable alumni ==
- Melody Beattie, self-help author
- Philip Brunelle, classical musician and founder of music group VocalEssence
- Homer D. Hagstrum, elected to National Academy of Sciences
- Carol M. Highsmith, photographer
- Chet Holmgren, active professional basketball player for the Oklahoma City Thunder
- Reynold B. Johnson, inventor
- Addi Mack, college basketball player for the Maryland Terrapins
- John Munson, musician and bass player for Semisonic
- C. Donald Peterson, Justice, Minnesota Supreme Court (1967–1986)
- P. Kenneth Peterson, Mayor of Minneapolis (1957–1961) and Minnesota House of Representatives (1947–1955)
- Amy Sannes, competed in speed skating at the Nagano 1998, Salt Lake 2002, and Turin 2006 Olympics
- Jalen Suggs, active professional basketball player for the Orlando Magic

== Publications ==
MA's yearbook is named The Antler, with its middle school counterpart the Minneantler. MA's school newspaper is The Talon, referring to the foot of the fictional Redhawk mascot. It is a member of the High School National Ad Network. MA's quarterly news publication for parents and alumni is called The Arrow.
