= Hiawatha Island =

Island in Tioga County, New York, United States

- Location within New York Adirondack Park Location within the United States

Geography
- Location: Susquehanna River
- Coordinates: 42°05′03″N 76°12′34″W
- Highest elevation: 817 ft (249 m)

Administration
- United States
- State: New York
- County: Tioga
- Village: Owego

Hiawatha Island is an island located by Owego, New York, on the Susquehanna River. The island covers an area of 112 acres which makes up the majority of Hiawatha Island Riverfront Park Complex. The island is the largest island on the Susquehanna River in New York State and contains a diverse collection of woods, meadows and fields. The island exists as part of the Susquehanna 100 year flood plain.

Hiawatha Island is known to have been used by native peoples but no evidence exists to suggest it was ever permanently inhabited. In 1870 a hotel was built on the island which became a popular destination for river boat travelers between Owego and Binghamton. The hotel was closed in 1895 and the island was held in private hands until 1988 when a collective of local citizens began an effort to preserve the island as a wildlife refuge and educational center managed by the Waterman Center. Few of the original structures built on the island exist today.

In 1994 a historical description of Hiawatha Island and its inhabitants was published by the Owego Historical Society.
