= Susquehanna State Park (Pennsylvania) =

State park in Lycoming County, Pennsylvania

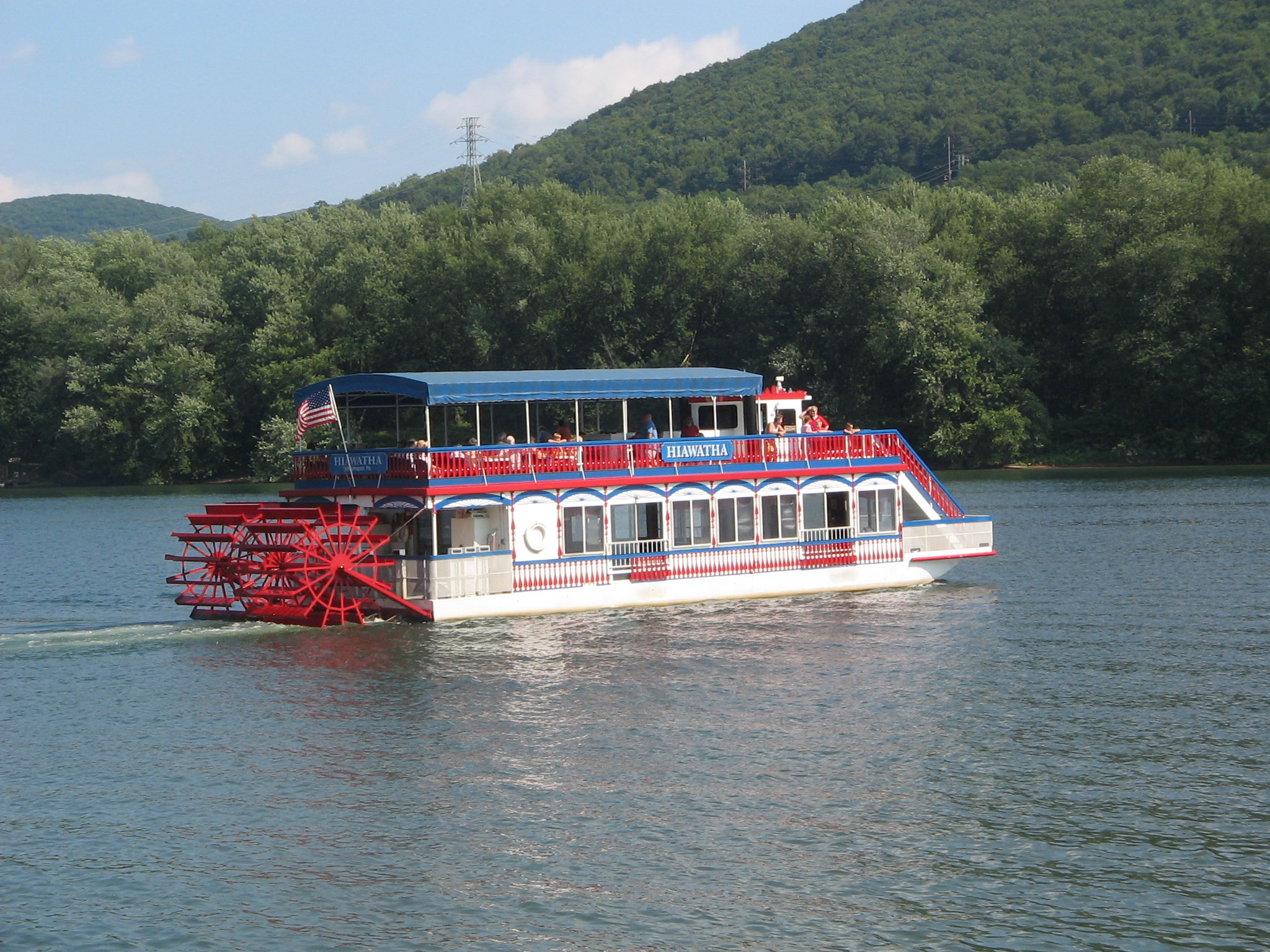
- The Hiawatha paddlewheeler in the West Branch Susquehanna River at Susquehanna State Park

- Location within Pennsylvania Location within the United States
- Interactive map of Susquehanna State Park
- Location: Williamsport, Pennsylvania, United States
- Coordinates: 41°13′39″N 77°02′45″W
- Area: 20 acres (8.1 ha)
- Elevation: 518 feet (158 m)
- Established: 1961
- Administrator: Pennsylvania Department of Conservation and Natural Resources
- Website: Official website
- Pennsylvania State Parks

Susquehanna State Park is a Pennsylvania state park on 20 acres (8.1 ha) in Williamsport in Lycoming County, Pennsylvania in the United States. The park is on the West Branch Susquehanna River in the western part of Williamsport, and is operated by the Williamsport / Lycoming Chamber of Commerce in cooperation with the Bureau of State Parks of the Pennsylvania Department of Conservation and Natural Resources. Susquehanna State Park offers cruises on a paddlewheeler, boating, fishing, and picnicking.

== History ==
The park land was originally part of the West Branch Division of the Pennsylvania Canal, which ran along the left bank of the West Branch from Susquehanna River from Northumberland to Lock Haven. The canal was in operation here from October 15, 1834 to July 1, 1889, when a major flood destroyed it.

The Susquehanna Boom was a system of cribs and chained logs in the West Branch Susquehanna River, designed to catch and hold floating timber until it could be processed at one of the nearly 60 sawmills along the river between Lycoming and Loyalsock Creeks in Lycoming County, Pennsylvania in the United States. Susquehanna State Park is located within just a small section of what was once the boom. The Susquehanna Boom was originally built under the supervision of James H. Perkins, and operated from 1851 to 1909, when it shut down for lack of timber.

When flood control levees were built around Williamsport, the park land was left outside the levee system. It was developed as a "riverfront recreational area" by the state and city, opening in 1961. The modern paddlewheeler Hiawatha began excursions here in 1982. In the winter of 2000-2001, the Hiawatha was rebuilt with a new hull at a cost of $200,000.

While the Williamsport / Lycoming Chamber of Commerce operates the park, responsibility for its facilities within the Pennsylvania Department of Conservation and Natural Resources lies with Shikellamy State Park.

== Facilities and recreation ==
Cruises on the paddlewheeler Hiawatha are one of the main attractions at Susquehanna State Park. One-hour-long public cruises are offered on weekends from May to October, as well as weekdays from July to September. The Hiawatha celebrated its twenty-fifth anniversary of excursions in 2006. A variety of special cruises are offered, including: family night, karaoke, Sunday brunch, dinner, and sunset concert cruises. Charters are also available.

The Hiawatha House has souvenirs, snacks, and tickets for cruises. The Hiawatha is run by River Valley Transit, which also operates bus and tourist trolley service in Lycoming County.

The park's boat launch allows access to the river for boating. There is no horsepower limit for motor boats. Canoes, kayaks, rowboats, and other non-powered boats are also allowed. A dam on the West Branch Susquehanna River at Hepburn Street in Williamsport provides 652 acres (264 ha) of water deep enough for waterskiing.

Fishing is allowed from the banks of the river and from boats. Common species of fish (both cold and warm water) include catfish, panfish, and smallmouth bass. The laws and regulations of the Pennsylvania Fish and Boat Commission apply.

Picnicking is possible on the picnic tables throughout the park, as well as a pavilion with more tables, which may be reserved.
