= Hiawatha Music Festival =

- Status: active
- Genre: festivals
- Frequency: Annually
- Location: Marquette, Michigan
- Coordinates: 46°34′08″N 87°24′37″W
- Country: U.S.
- Years active: 46–47
- Inaugurated: 1979
- Website: hiawathamusic.org

The Hiawatha Traditional Music Festival is a music festival held each year in Marquette, Michigan during the next-to-last full weekend of July and features traditional, acoustic and American music. Each year's main-stage line-up can include bluegrass, old-time, Cajun, Celtic, acoustic blues, Gospel, etc. The line-up includes national, regional and local performers, and singers/songwriters are always featured. The Festival also includes music and activities designed for teens and children. An arts and crafts show sponsored by a local art organization is held in conjunction with the Festival. The Hiawatha Festival began in 1979 in Champion, Michigan. Since 1984, the Festival has been held at the Marquette Tourist Park, a campground along the Dead River.

The Hiawatha Music Festival is conducted by the Hiawatha Music N-n Profit Corporation, 501(c)3 non-profit commonly known as the Hiawatha Music Co-op.

The festival closed in 2020 due to the COVID-19 pandemic. Then in 2021 a virtual concert was held. The concert returned to in-person operations in 2022.
