= Milwaukee Avenue Historic District =

Historic district in Minnesota, United States

- U.S. National Register of Historic Places
- U.S. Historic district
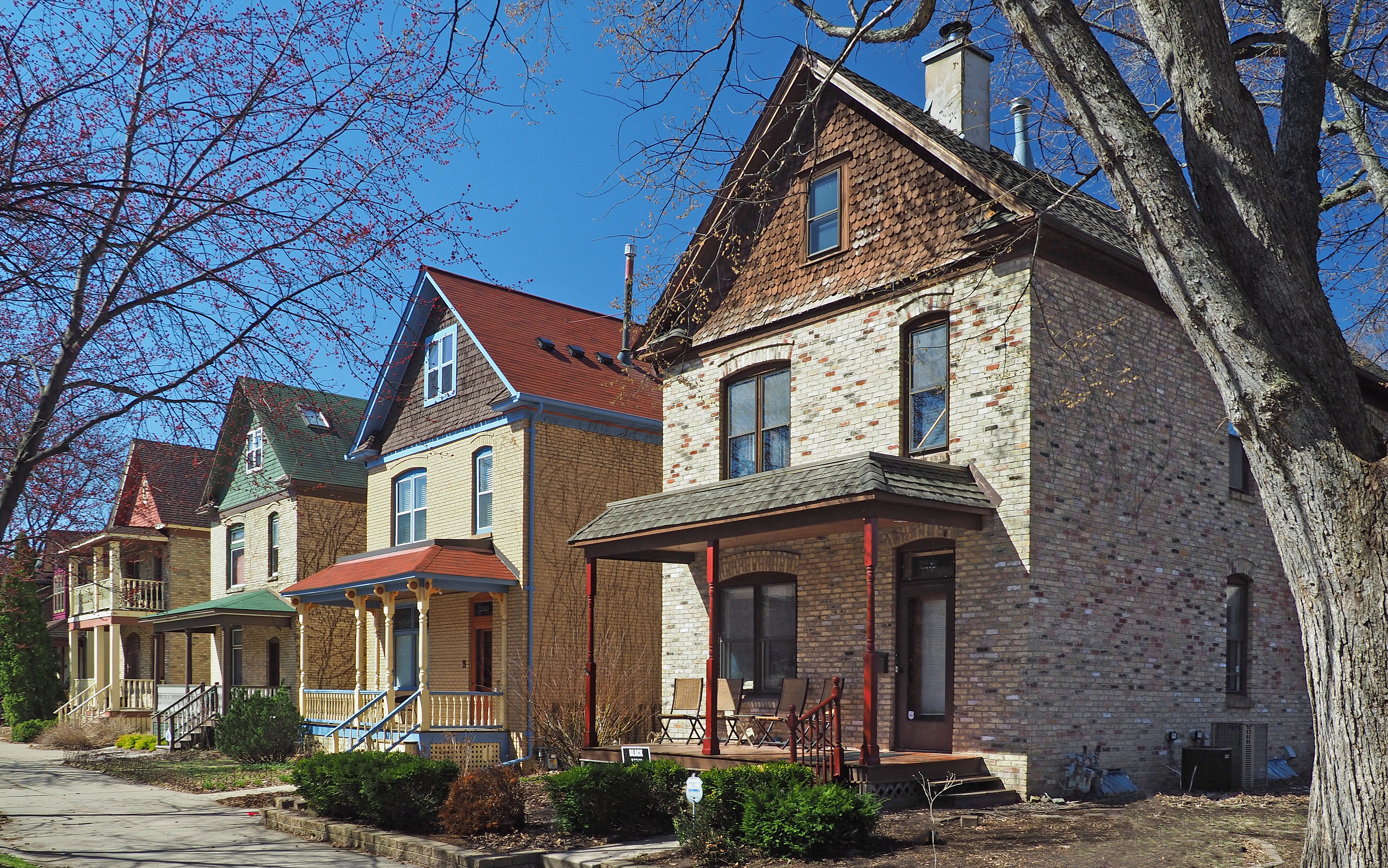
- Four houses within the Milwaukee Avenue Historic District

- Location within Minnesota Location within the United States
- Location: Minneapolis, Minnesota
- Coordinates: 44°57′39″N 93°14′24″W
- Built: 1885
- Architect: Ragan, William
- Architectural style: Common Man's Architecture
- NRHP reference No.: 74001021
- Added to NRHP: May 2, 1974

The Milwaukee Avenue Historic District is a historic district in the Seward neighborhood of Minneapolis. The district comprises two city blocks of small homes on quarter-sized lots. These houses were built between 1884 and 1890 by William Ragan, a Minneapolis real estate speculator. Built for lower-income residents, the houses had deteriorated in condition by the end of World War II, and by the 1970s, were planned for demolition. A group of residents and concerned citizens fought to save the houses, eventually leading to their inclusion on the National Register of Historic Places and the federal protection and rehabilitation that comes with the designation. Today, the houses sit along a bike- and pedestrian-friendly mall on which motor traffic is prohibited.

== Early history ==
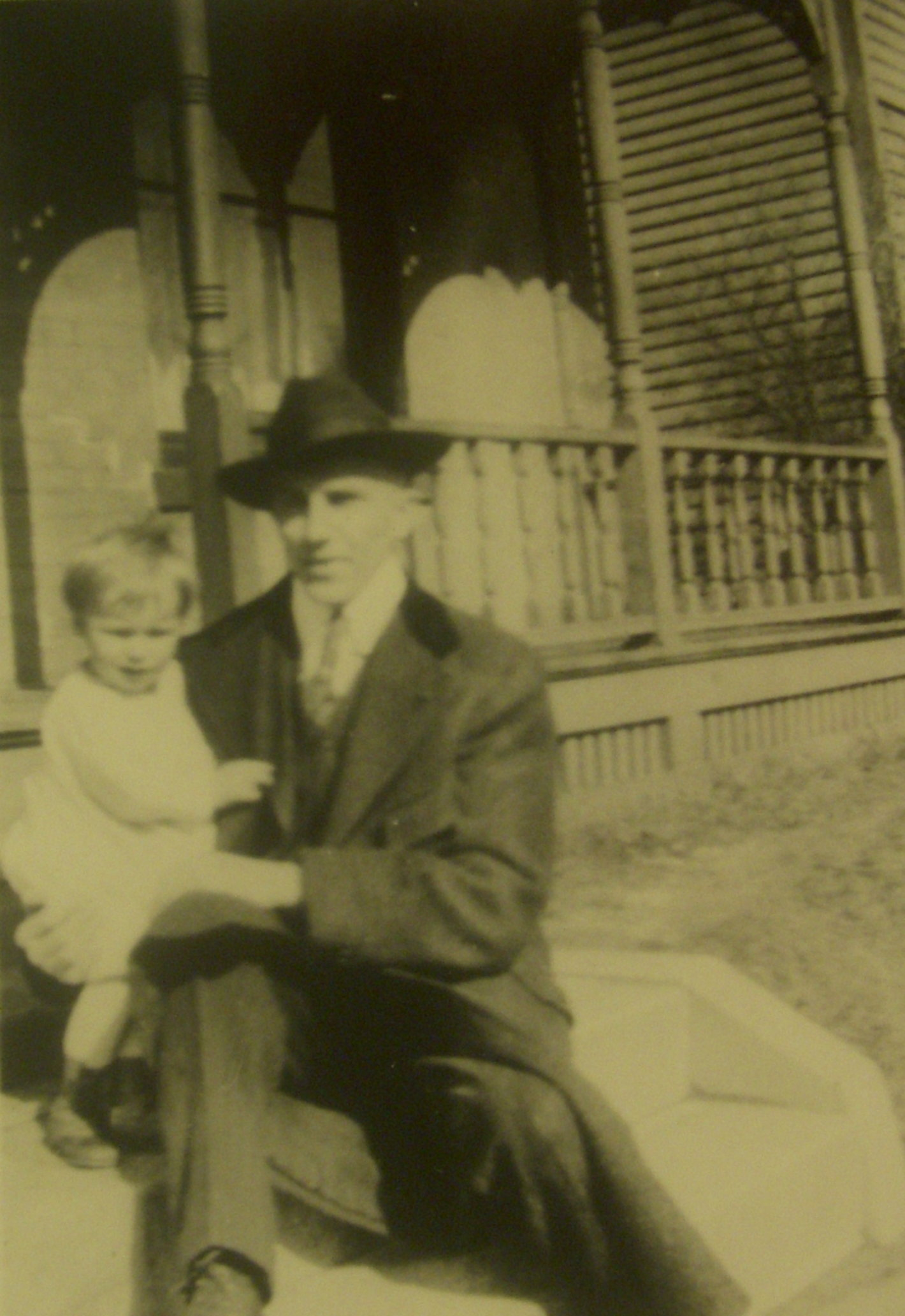
Residents of Milwaukee Avenue in the early decades of the 20th century

During the late 19th century, the population of Minneapolis was growing rapidly, increasing 351 percent from 1880 to 1890. With the number of people moving into the city, lower-cost housing was needed for immigrants who were new to Minnesota. The street had originally been platted as an alley between 22nd and 23rd Avenues South, but William Ragan developed it as a street and labeled it 22½ Avenue. The houses were situated close together on narrow lots, with very narrow side yards and no front yards. This almost gives the impression of rowhouses. Most of the houses were built with brick veneer on timber frames, and they have uniform-sized roof slopes, modified flat arch windows, and open front porches.

The street kept its '½' until 1906, when petitioners asked the Minneapolis City Council to change the street's name to Woodland Avenue because they said the '½' made them feel like they lived in an alley. For an unknown reason, the street's name was not changed to Woodland Avenue, but to Milwaukee Avenue. The Avenue's proximity to the Milwaukee Short Line Railroad has been suggested as a cause.

== Deterioration and restoration ==
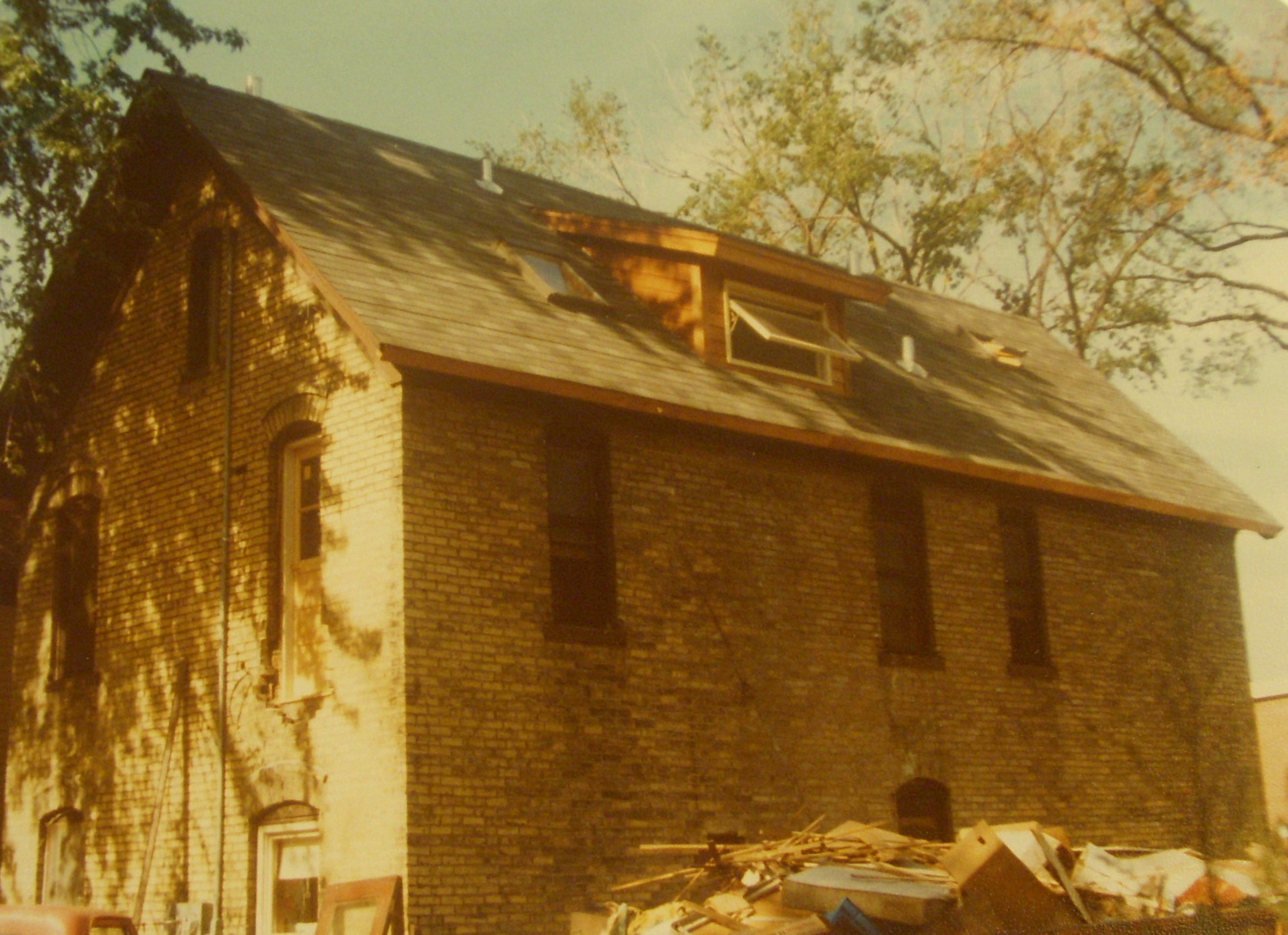
A Milwaukee Avenue house being restored

By the time World War II was over, the houses on Milwaukee Avenue were falling into disrepair. They had been neglected throughout the Great Depression and wartime. In 1959, the City of Minneapolis presented a plan for the Seward neighborhood, which listed the houses on Milwaukee Avenue in 'deteriorated' condition, meaning they had no indoor plumbing or were severely battered.

In many other neighborhoods, the city had renewed and thus gentrified areas without public hearings, because residents of those neighborhoods were low-income renters. In Milwaukee Avenue's case, however, the residents were of medium income, and seasoned protesters, since many had protested the Vietnam War. By 1970, the City of Minneapolis planned to raze the Milwaukee Avenue houses using funds from the Housing and Urban Development (HUD) program.

The residents of Milwaukee Avenue and the surrounding Seward neighborhood formed the Seward West Project Area Committee (PAC) in order to try to save the Milwaukee Avenue homes. They argued that the houses had significant historic value and needed to be preserved. The City argued that the houses were legally nonconforming, and rehabilitating them would cost more than just building new houses.

The City furthered its plan of renewing the area and took no heed of the PAC. In response, the PAC secretly submitted an application to the National Register of Historic Places for the Milwaukee Avenue district. It was approved on May 2, 1974, by Secretary of the Interior Rogers CB Morton. This meant that the city could not alter or destroy the houses using federal funds without a public hearing.

Nine of Milwaukee Avenue's houses had to be destroyed due to their decrepit conditions and a tenth was moved elsewhere. In the spaces where these houses once stood, townhomes were built, mirroring the style of the original houses. The rest of the houses got new indoor plumbing, new basements, improved woodwork and porches added on. Additionally, a pedestrian mall was built down the center of Milwaukee Avenue to replace a one-way street. The Avenue is now bike and pedestrian friendly, and cars are prohibited.

== Milwaukee Avenue today ==
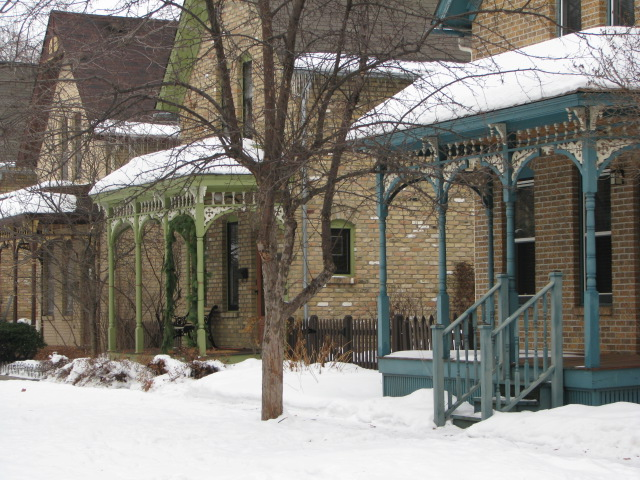
Milwaukee Avenue in winter

Milwaukee Avenue still stands today. In 2007, to celebrate the 30th anniversary of Milwaukee Avenue's rehabilitation, self-guided walking tours of eight of the houses were offered to the public.

The houses were featured on local CBS station WCCO-TV's Finding Minnesota series in 2005. The two-minute video segment about the avenue featured interviews with a resident of Milwaukee Avenue, as well as Bob Roscoe, an activist who led the fight to save Milwaukee Avenue.
