= Cooper, Minneapolis =

Neighborhood of Longfellow, Minneapolis

Coordinates: 44.94451°N 93.21170°W

Cooper
- Neighborhood
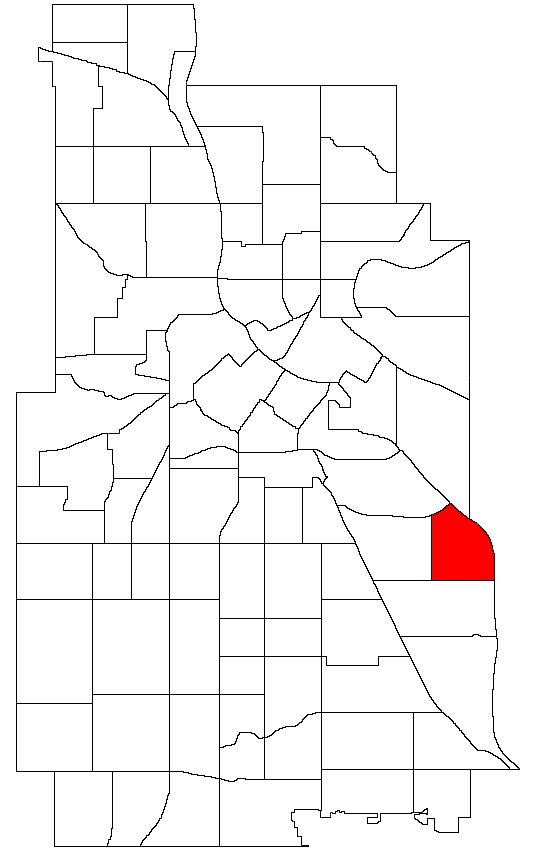
- Location of Cooper within the U.S. city of Minneapolis
- Interactive map of Cooper
- Country: United States
- State: Minnesota
- County: Hennepin
- City: Minneapolis
- Community: Longfellow
- City Council Ward: 12

Government
  - Council Member: Aurin Chowdhury

Area
  - Total: 0.67 sq mi (1.7 km^{2})

Population (2020)
  - Total: 3,560
  - Density: 5,300/sq mi (2,100/km^{2})
- Time zone: UTC-6 (CST)
  - Summer (DST): UTC-5 (CDT)
- ZIP code: 55406
- Area code: 612

Historical population
Census	Pop.	Note	%±
1980	3,938		—
1990	3,708		−5.8%
2000	3,448		−7.0%
2010	3,503		1.6%
2020	3,560		1.6%

The Cooper neighborhood (part of the larger Longfellow community) resides along the west shore of the Mississippi River in south Minneapolis. It is bound by 34th St. E. on the south, 38th Ave. S. on the west, 27th St. E. on the north, and the river gorge to the east. Bordering neighborhoods are Seward to the north, Longfellow to the west, and Howe to the south. St. Paul's Merriam Park neighborhood is just across the Mississippi River to the east.

Cooper was named after the 19th-century author James Fenimore Cooper, best known for writing The Last of the Mohicans (1832).

== Geography ==
The Mississippi River Gorge is unique to this stretch of the entire Mississippi. The river cut an eighty-plus foot gorge as what is now St. Anthony Falls moved upstream over thousands of years, finally stopping at downtown Minneapolis due to engineering work during the city's flour milling boom times. Today, the Mississippi River Gorge is a protected natural landscape.

== Demographics ==
Race/ethnicity
Race/ethnicity	2000		2010		2020	
Race/ethnicity	Number	%	Number	%	Number	%
White alone	2,985	86.57	2,936	83.96	2,907	82.44
Black alone	120	3.48	114	3.26	141	4.00
Hispanic or Latino (any race)	127	3.68	185	5.29	200	5.67
Native American alone	57	1.65	45	1.29	19	0.54
Asian alone	75	2.18	113	3.23	85	2.41
Other race alone	3	0.09	2	0.06	14	0.40
Pacific Islander alone	2	0.06	0	0.00	2	0.06
Two or more races	79	2.29	102	2.92	158	4.48
Total	3,448	100.0	3,497	100.0	3,526	100.0

== Schools ==
2005 marked the closing of Cooper Elementary School, forcing Cooper's children to move to the neighboring Longfellow Elementary, which itself closed in 2010. Today, elementary students in Cooper are split between Dowling Elementary School and Hiawatha Elementary School.

Sanford Middle School and Andersen Middle School serve the Cooper neighborhood with students from Hiawatha/Howe tracking to Sanford and Dowling students tracking to Andersen.

South High School and Roosevelt High School serve the neighborhood with Sanford students tracking to Roosevelt and Andersen students tracking to South. Spanish Immersion magnet students at Andersen track to Roosevelt for high school.

Minnehaha Academy's (private) high school is located in Cooper along West River Road. Their middle school is further south on West River Road in the Howe neighborhood.

== Political representation ==
Cooper is part of City Council Ward 12 and Minnesota Legislative District 63A.

- City Council (Ward 12): Aurin Chowdhury
- Minneapolis Park Board (District 3): Becky Alper
- Minneapolis Mayor: Jacob Frey
- Hennepin County Commissioner (District 4): Angela Conley
- Minnesota House of Representatives (District 63A): Samantha Sencer-Mura
- Minnesota Senate (District 63): Zaynab Mohamed
- US House of Representatives (District 5): Ilhan Omar

== Notable residents ==
- Jesse Ventura, former Minnesota Governor, grew up in the house on the southwest corner of 32nd St. E. and 46th Ave. S.

== See also ==
- Neighborhoods of Minneapolis
