= Longfellow (neighborhood), Minneapolis =

Neighborhood of Longfellow community in Minneapolis

Coordinates: 44.9405°N 93.2231°W

Longfellow
- Neighborhood
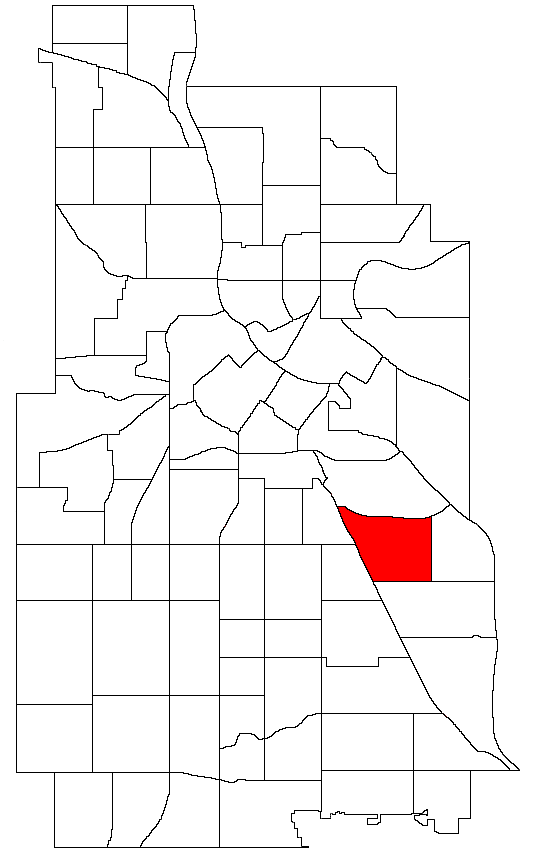
- Location of Longfellow within the U.S. city of Minneapolis
- Interactive map of Longfellow
- Country: United States
- State: Minnesota
- County: Hennepin
- City: Minneapolis
- Community: Longfellow
- City Council Ward: 12

Government
  - Council Member: Aurin Chowdhury

Area
  - Total: 0.852 sq mi (2.21 km^{2})

Population (2020)
  - Total: 5,086
  - Density: 5,970/sq mi (2,300/km^{2})
- Time zone: UTC-6 (CST)
  - Summer (DST): UTC-5 (CDT)
- ZIP code: 55406
- Area code: 612

Historical population
Census	Pop.	Note	%±
1980	5,078		—
1990	5,023		−1.1%
2000	4,972		−1.0%
2010	4,895		−1.5%
2020	5,086		3.9%

Longfellow is a neighborhood within the larger Longfellow community in Minneapolis, United States. It is bounded by Seward to the North, Cooper to the East, Howe to the South, and Corcoran and East Phillips to the West. It is part of Minneapolis City Council Ward 12, represented by Aurin Chowdhury.

== History ==
Longfellow was named after Henry Wadsworth Longfellow, who wrote The Song of Hiawatha.

Longfellow was the center point of riots during the George Floyd protests in Minneapolis–Saint Paul in May 2020.

== Neighborhood Characteristics ==
Longfellow is populated by a diverse, predominantly middle-class and working-class population.

Notable buildings include:

- Christ Church Lutheran, designed by Eliel Saarinen
- First Free Methodist
- East Lake Library

== Demographics ==
In 2016, the neighborhood had a population of 5,176. The neighborhood is ethnically diverse at 57.6% European American, 18.8% African American, 12.6% Hispanic or Latino, 4.4% of Two or more races, and 2.8% Asian American.

Race/ethnicity
Race/ethnicity	2000		2010		2020	
Race/ethnicity	Number	%	Number	%	Number	%
White alone	3,375	67.88	3,035	61.93	3,073	60.55
Black alone	525	10.56	678	13.83	756	14.90
Hispanic or Latino (any race)	483	9.71	686	14.00	702	13.83
Native American alone	196	3.94	192	3.92	106	2.09
Asian alone	168	3.38	87	1.78	117	2.31
Other race alone	21	0.42	5	0.10	27	0.53
Pacific Islander alone	0	0.00	4	0.08	1	0.02
Two or more races	204	4.10	214	4.37	296	5.83
Total	4,972	100.0	4,901	100.0	5,075	100.0

== See also ==
- Neighborhoods of Minneapolis
