= Standish, Minneapolis =

Neighborhood of Minneapolis

Coordinates: 44.9332°N 93.2357°W

Standish
- Neighborhood
- 40th Street Park

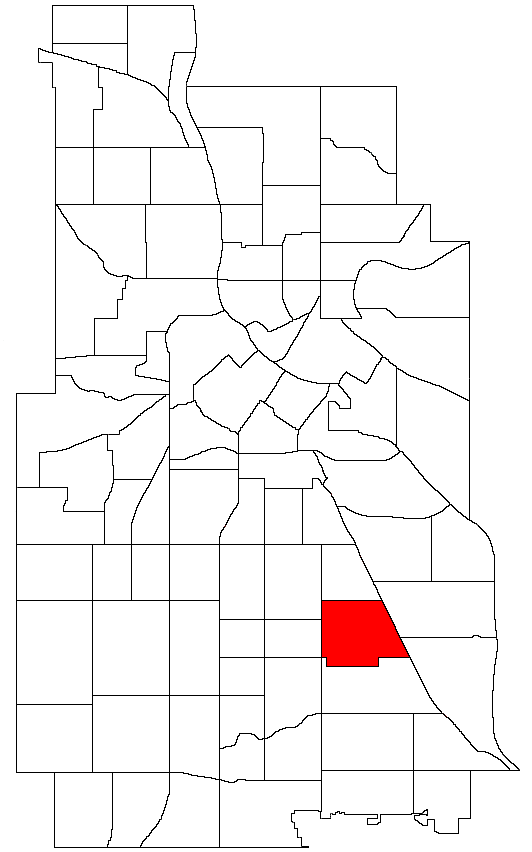
- Location of Standish within the U.S. city of Minneapolis
- Interactive map of Standish
- Country: United States
- State: Minnesota
- County: Hennepin
- City: Minneapolis
- Community: Powderhorn
- Founded: 1849; 177 years ago
- City Council Ward: 12

Government
  - Council Member: Aurin Chowdhury

Area
  - Total: 0.82 sq mi (2.1 km^{2})

Population (2020)
  - Total: 6,625
  - Density: 8,100/sq mi (3,100/km^{2})
- Time zone: UTC-6 (CST)
  - Summer (DST): UTC-5 (CDT)
- ZIP code: 55406, 55407
- Area code: 612

Historical population
Census	Pop.	Note	%±
1980	6,420		—
1990	6,478		0.9%
2000	6,632		2.4%
2010	6,527		−1.6%
2020	6,625		1.5%

Standish is a neighborhood within the Powderhorn community in Minneapolis, Minnesota, United States named after Captain Miles Standish. Its boundaries are East 36th Street to the north, Hiawatha Avenue to the east, East 42nd and 43rd Streets to the south, and Cedar Avenue to the west.

Standish is entirely located within Minneapolis City Council Ward 12 and state legislative district 63A. It shares a neighborhood organization with the Ericsson neighborhood, which is part of the Nokomis community; signs at the neighborhood boundaries welcome you to "Standish-Ericsson".

Roosevelt High School is located in Standish.

== Demographics ==
Race/ethnicity
Race/ethnicity	2000		2010		2020	
Race/ethnicity	Number	%	Number	%	Number	%
White alone	4,898	73.85	4,605	70.55	4,977	72.43
Black alone	574	8.66	455	6.97	479	6.97
Hispanic or Latino (any race)	466	7.03	922	14.13	718	10.45
Native American alone	249	3.75	154	2.36	99	1.44
Asian alone	183	2.76	148	2.27	182	2.65
Other race alone	18	0.27	16	0.25	34	0.49
Pacific Islander alone	1	0.02	2	0.03	5	0.07
Two or more races	243	3.66	225	3.45	377	5.49
Total	6,632	100.0	6,527	100.0	6,871	100.0
