= Quatrefoil Library =

Non-profit LGBTQ library in Minneapolis

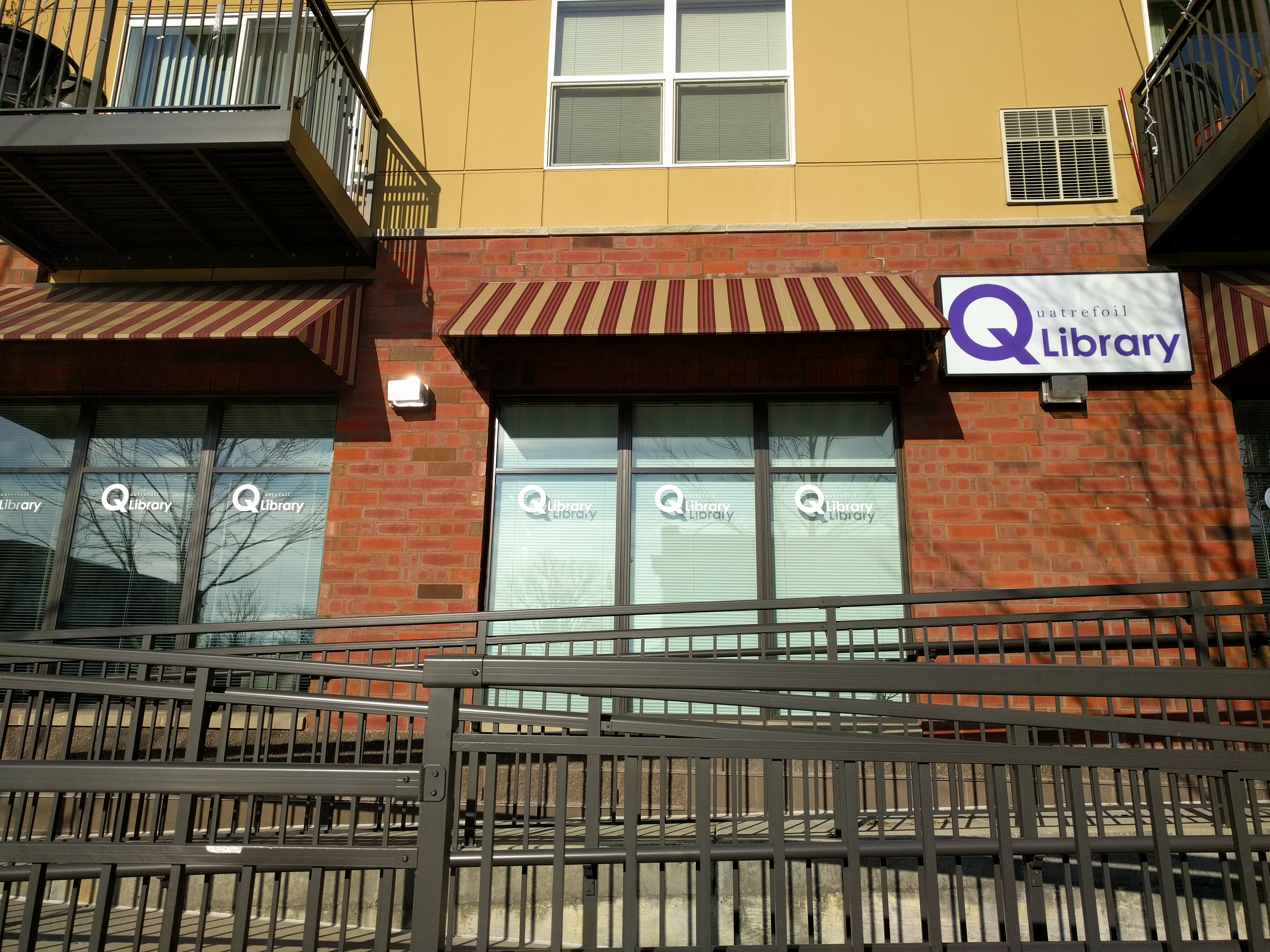
- Quatrefoil Library as seen from the pavement in front of the building.
- 44°56′54.7″N 93°15′24.1″W
- Location: 1220 East Lake Street; Minneapolis, Minnesota, United States
- Type: Special library
- Scope: LGBT
- Established: 1983; 43 years ago
- Branches: 1

Collection
- Items collected: Books, magazines, DVDs, VHS tapes
- Size: 15,000+ books 7,000+ DVDs

Access and use
- Access requirements: Library membership
- Members: 400+

Other information
- Website: qlibrary.org

Quatrefoil Library is a member-supported, 501(c)(3) non-profit library and community center for the lesbian, gay, bisexual, and transgender community. It is located in Minneapolis, Minnesota, where it was founded by David Irwin and Dick Hewetson in 1983. It is the second LGBT lending library in the United States, and the oldest such library in the Upper Midwest. In the beginning, it was not only an educational resource center but also a safe space for LGBT people. The library houses over 15,000 books, 7,000 DVDs, a collection of first editions and rare books, and books in braille. It hosts poetry readings, panel discussions, book launches, and other events, open to all.

The library celebrated its 30th anniversary in 2016.

== Early history ==
The doors of the library officially opened to the public on February 4, 1986. It opened with a significant donation from the collections of David Irwin but afterwards received donations from individuals across the country. Quatrefoil Library shared space with the Minnesota Civil Liberties Union at 1021 West Broadway in Minneapolis. Sixteen months after its opening, the library moved to a bigger building in St. Paul to accommodate the growing collection. Early volunteers and supporters include Jean-Nickolaus Tretter of the Tretter Collection, Tim Campbell who provided ad space in his publication and George Holdgrafer of Lavender magazine. The library published a newsletter, The Gay Bookworm, which was later christened Quatrefolio.

The library took its name from the novel Quatrefoil: A Modern Novel by James Barr. Founding member David Irwin had been so impressed with the positive portrayal of homosexuality, that he insisted on naming their collection the Quatrefoil Library.

In 2013, the library moved to its present site in Minneapolis with twice as much space as it had in St. Paul.

In 2019, the library announced the creation of a scholarship for LGBTQ+ students attending college in Minnesota. In 2021, Quatrefoil switched to a free membership system that enabled anyone to sign up for a library card and borrow materials at no charge. In October 2022, it launched Q Digital, a collection of LGBTQ+ ebooks and audiobooks that can be borrowed by Q cardholders for free.

== Mission statement ==
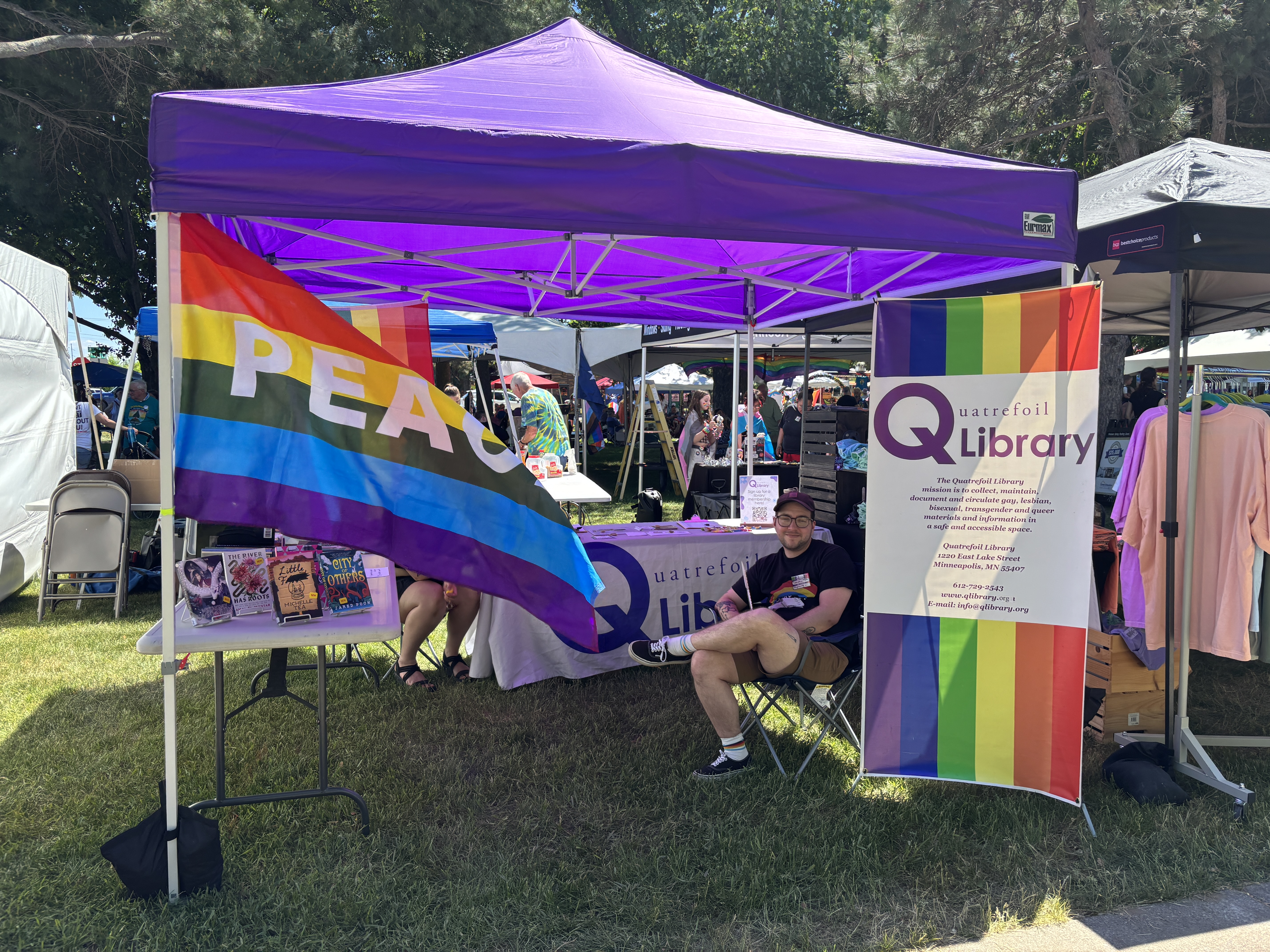
Booth at East-Central Minnesota Pride in Pine City, Minnesota

The mission of the Quatrefoil Library states that, "Quatrefoil Library is a community center that cultivates the free exchange of ideas and makes accessible LGBTQ+ materials for education and inspiration."

== Collections ==
The library's collection includes lesbian periodicals, documentaries, gay-themed posters, pulp novels, fiction, non-fiction, art, and photography books. As of 2007, the volume of the collection included more 14,000 books, 1,040 DVDs, 2,123 VHS videotapes, 500 periodicals and 1,550 pulp novels. The library also houses a collection of rare and out-of-print books.

== Conferences ==
Quatrefoil collaborated with the University of Minnesota Libraries and the Tretter Collection in GLBT Studies to host the 2006 ALMS Conference, the first international conference on LGBT Archives, Libraries, Museums, and Special Collections in Minneapolis.

== See also ==
- Libraries and the LGBTQ community

== Bibliography ==
- Keim, Adam (2008). History of the Quatrefoil Library (PDF). Friends of the Bill of Rights. ISBN 9780966882827.
- Van Cleve, Stewart (2012). Land of 10,000 Loves: A History of Queer Minnesota. Univ Of Minnesota Press.
- Larsen, Elizabeth Foy (2017). 111 Places in the Twin Cities that You Must Not Miss. Emons Verlang GmbH. pp. 172–3. ISBN 9783740800291.
