= Tretter =

Tretter may refer to

== People ==
=== Surname ===
- Tretter (surname), with a list of people so named.

== Other uses ==
- Jean-Nickolaus Tretter Collection in Gay, Lesbian, Bisexual and Transgender Studies
