= ALMS Conference =

International conference

The Archives, Libraries, Museums and Special Collections (ALMS) Conference is an international event focussed on the work by public, private, academic, and grassroots organisations which are collecting, capture and preserving archives of LGBTQ+ experiences, to ensure their histories continue to be documented and share

The first GLBT ALMS Conference was held in Minnesota in 2006, co-hosted by the Tretter Collection and the Quatrefoil Library. The London conference in 2016 focused on exploring margins, borders, barriers and intersections of LGBTQ+ historical research and collecting, while the 2019 conference in Berlin focused on exploring the potential of generating audiences for queer archives, libraries, museums and special collections, with a special emphasis on the arts and artistic interventions.

== History ==
The first GLBT ALMS Conference was held on May 18–21, 2006, and presented by the Quatrefoil Library, the University of Minnesota Libraries and the Tretter Collection in GLBT Studies.

The mission of the conference:

"GLBT ALMS 2006 is the first formal world conference for professional and anyone involved with GLBT archives, libraries, museums and special collections, and collectors of LGBT materials. Led by experts from the field, the conference will explore a range of current professional topics, including:

- Censorship and sexually-explicit material
- Integrating GLBT collections into the classroom
- Preservation issues
- Working with the media and more..."

Keynote speakers included Barbara Gittings and Frank Kameny.

== Past Conferences ==
2006 GLBT ALMS Conference

- Minnesota, May 18–21
- Hosted by the Quatrefoil Library and the Jean-Nickolaus Tretter Collection in GLBT Studies

2008 GLBT ALMS Conference

- New York, May 8–10
- Hosted by the Center for LGBTQ Studies (CLAGS)

2011 LGBT ALMS Conference

- West Hollywood and UCLA, May 12–15
- Hosted by the June L. Mazer Lesbian Archives and the UCLA Library – Center for Women

2012 LGBTI ALMS Conference: "The Future of LGBTI Histories"

- Amsterdam, August 1–3
- Hosted by the International Homo/Lesbian Information center and Archive (IHLIA)

2016 LGBTQ+ ALMS Conference: "Without Borders"

- London, June 22–24
- Hosted by the City of London through London Metropolitan Archives in partnership with Bishopsgate Institute and the University of Westminster

2019 LGBTQ+ ALMS Conference: "Queering memory"

- Berlin, 27–29 June
- Hosted by Magnus-Hirschfeld-Gesellschaft, Feministisches Archiv, and Haus der Kulturen der Welt
- Sponsored by Hauptstadtkulturfonds, Stiftung Deutsche Klassenlotterie Berlin, and Bundesstiftung Magnus Hirschfeld
