= Kautz Family YMCA Archives =

Coordinates: 44°58′24″N 93°14′35″W

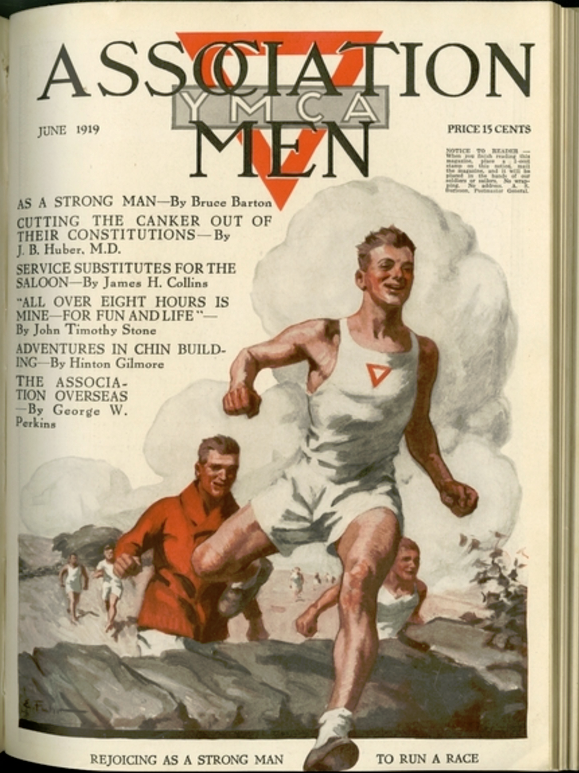
YMCA Association Men Cover June 1919.

The Kautz Family YMCA Archives, located at the University of Minnesota Libraries in Minneapolis, United States, archives the historical records of the U.S. YMCA national association, YMCA of the USA, the records of the Minneapolis and Greater New York YMCAs, and those of the Y's Men International, a service club in partnership with the YMCA.

The Kautz Family YMCA Archives are a unit of the University of Minnesota Libraries Department of Archives and Special Collections, and housed in the Elmer L. Andersen Library on the University of Minnesota Minneapolis West Bank Campus.

== Holdings ==
The records of YMCA of the USA, founded in 1851, and its various committees, programs, and constituent bodies, form the core of the Archives. In addition to personal papers of over 300 YMCA leaders, the collection has more than 75,000 photos dating from the American Civil War to the present. Other materials include a complete set of Association Press publications, rare books and pamphlets, meeting minutes, research studies, scrapbooks, and artifacts such as flags from countries where YMCA foreign secretaries worked.

Although the Archives generally does not collect the records of state or local YMCAs, holdings do include the records of the Minneapolis and Greater New York YMCAs and of related organizations serving the worldwide "Y" movement, including Y's Men International, an auxiliary service organization, and the Association of Professional Directors. Also in the collections are the records of George Williams College, formerly located in Chicago.

The collection spans the period from the early 19th century to the present (with the bulk concentrated from the 1850s to the 1980s) and documents every aspect of the YMCA, from work in the United States and overseas to the student movement, YMCA programs, local Ys, and the Armed Services and Transportation Ys. It contains records on the YMCA's moves to include women and minorities, information about the Y's service during wartime, and files on hundreds of YMCA buildings in 90 countries. The records contain extensive information on YMCA programs in religion, education, physical education, sports and leisure; and on groups the YMCA served both in the United States and abroad, among them students, African Americans, Native Americans, railroad workers, members of the armed services, and coal miners. Subjects covered include the evolution of the YMCA from its Protestant evangelical origins, the YMCA's contributions to American Civil War relief, the invention of basketball and volleyball, rural reconstruction in India and Korea, teaching English as a second or foreign language, and more. Records from the International Division include valuable material from the turn of the 20th century to the present day about China, Japan, Latin America, Europe, Africa, and the Middle East.

== History ==
The Archives were founded in 1877, by Jacob Titus Bowne (1847–1925), as a private collection of key material he was using in preparation for becoming the General Secretary at the YMCA in Hudson, New York. Realizing the great value of conserving the literature and records of the Association, he began gathering and classifying this material for use in training other YMCA workers.

The collection moved to the YMCA Training School (later known as Springfield College in Springfield, Massachusetts, when it was founded in 1890, and then to New York City, when the YMCA built its first headquarters building there in 1908.

In 1980, the YMCA moved its headquarters to Chicago and the collection went into storage for several years. In 1985, the YMCA of the USA agreed to send the material to the University of Minnesota.

In 1999, Richard C. Kautz (1916–2003), a businessman and YMCA lay leader from Muscatine, Iowa, and his family donated funds for a major preservation project. In honor of their gift, the archives were renamed the Kautz Family YMCA Archives.
