= Andrea Jenkins =

American writer and politician (born 1961)

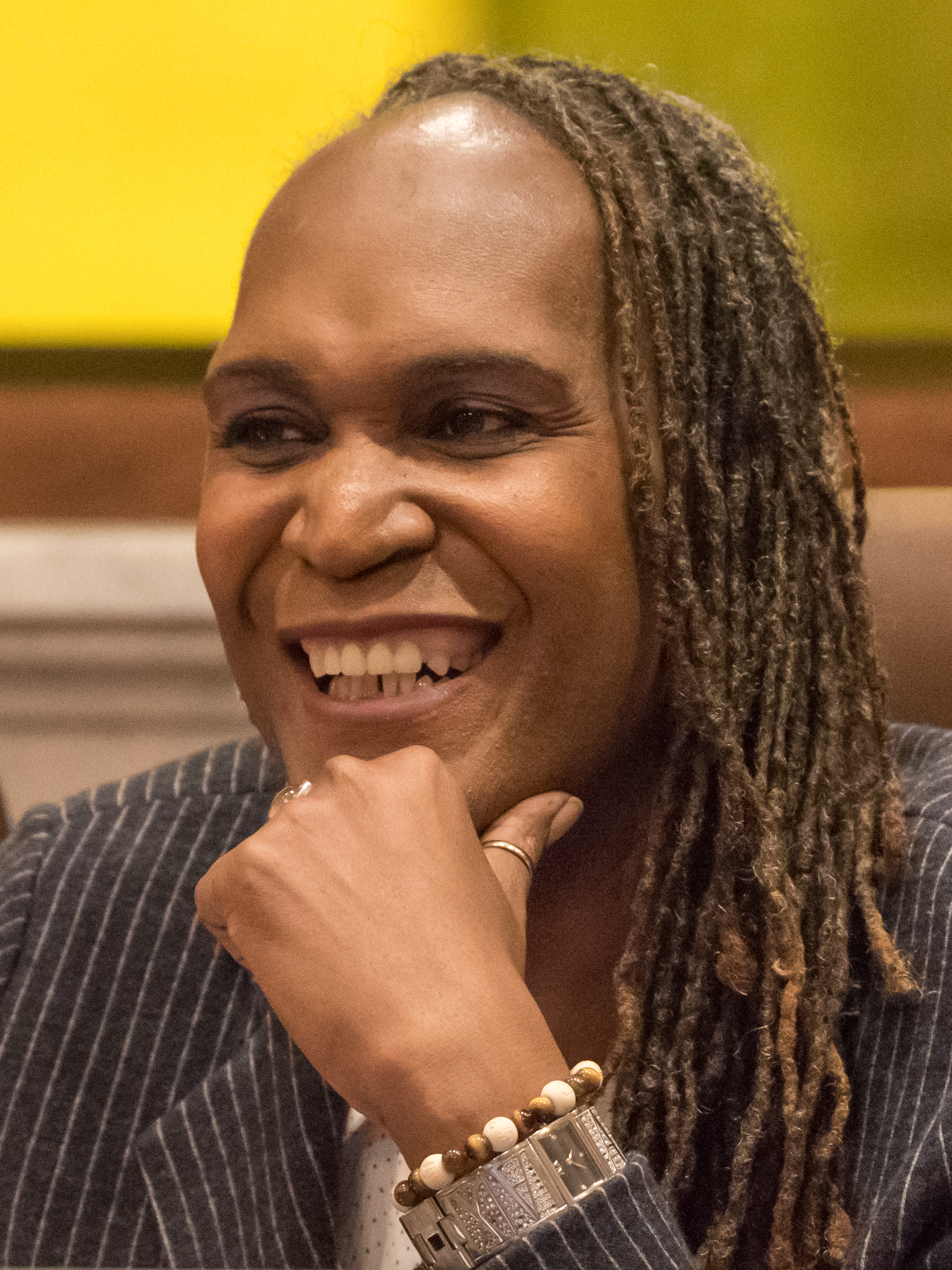
- Jenkins in 2018

President of the Minneapolis City Council
- In office January 10, 2022 – January 8, 2024
- Vice President: Linea Palmisano
- Preceded by: Lisa Bender
- Succeeded by: Elliott Payne

Vice President of the Minneapolis City Council
- In office January 6, 2018 – January 10, 2022
- President: Lisa Bender
- Preceded by: Elizabeth Glidden
- Succeeded by: Linea Palmisano

Member of the Minneapolis City Council from the 8th Ward
- In office January 6, 2018 – January 6, 2026
- Preceded by: Elizabeth Glidden
- Succeeded by: Soren Stevenson

Personal details
- Born: May 10, 1961 (age 65) Chicago, Illinois
- Party: Democratic (DFL)
- Education: University of Minnesota; Metropolitan State University (BA); Hamline University (MFA); Southern New Hampshire University (MS)
- Website: andreajenkins.webs.com

Andrea Jenkins (born May 10, 1961) is an American politician, writer, performance artist, poet, and transgender activist. She is known for being the first Black openly transgender woman elected to public office in the United States, serving from January 2018 to January 2026 on the Minneapolis City Council and as the council's president from 2022 to 2024.

Jenkins moved to Minnesota to attend the University of Minnesota in 1979 and was hired by the Hennepin County government, where she worked for a decade. Jenkins worked as a staff member on the Minneapolis City Council for 12 years before beginning work as curator of the Transgender Oral History Project at the University of Minnesota's Jean-Nickolaus Tretter Collection in Gay, Lesbian, Bisexual and Transgender Studies.

== Early life and education ==
Born in 1961, Andrea Jenkins was raised in North Lawndale, Chicago. She has said she grew up in "a low-income, working-class community" and "lived in some pretty rough places." She was raised by a single mother, Shirley Green, who was "very loving and very much concerned that we get a good education."

When she was young and still presenting as male, she participated in the Cub Scouts and played football at Robert Lindblom Math & Science Academy before moving to Minneapolis in 1979 to attend the University of Minnesota.

In her 20s, Jenkins married a woman, became a parent, came out as gay, and divorced. At 30, she began to outwardly present as female and returned to college to finish her bachelor's degree from Metropolitan State University, which she followed by earning two master's degrees–an MFA in creative writing from Hamline University and an MS in community economic development from Southern New Hampshire University. During which, Jenkins worked as a vocational counselor for the Hennepin County government. In 2018, Jenkins completed Harvard University's John F. Kennedy School of Government program for Senior Executives in State and Local Government as a David Bohnett LGBTQ Victory Institute Leadership fellow.

== Career ==
=== Local government ===
Jenkins worked for a decade as a vocational counselor with Hennepin County. In 2001, Robert Lilligren, who was running for a seat on the Minneapolis City Council, asked Jenkins to be a part of his campaign. After his election, Jenkins joined Lilligren's staff where she worked as his principal executive assistant for four years.

In 2005, Elizabeth Glidden was elected to the City Council and hired Jenkins as an aide, in part for Jenkins's extensive network that she had built up during her time in Lilligren's office. While on Glidden's staff, Jenkins earned a fellowship dedicated to transgender issues and helped to establish the Transgender Issues Work Group in 2014. That year, she organized a City Council summit on transgender equity intended to highlight the issues trans people in Minnesota face.

In 2015, after 12 years as a policy aide with the Minneapolis City Council, Jenkins began work at the University of Minnesota's Jean-Nickolaus Tretter Collection in Gay, Lesbian, Bisexual and Transgender Studies where she curates the Transgender Oral History Project (TOHP). Lisa Vecoli, curator of the Tretter Collection, noted that the materials within the collection tend to be gay white male-focused. In her role as curator of the TOHP, Jenkins will seek to expand the trans narratives archived in the collection by recording oral histories from up to 300 individuals, totaling as many as 400 hours of interviews.

=== Minneapolis city council ===
Jenkins announced in December 2016 that she would run to represent Minneapolis's 8th Ward on the City Council. Glidden, who held the seat, announced that she would not run for reelection. Jenkins’ campaign slogan was "Leadership. Access. Equity." With Hayden Mora, Jenkins founded Trans United Fund, a political action committee (PAC) to aid transgender candidates. On November 7, 2017, Jenkins won the election with more than 70% of the vote. The Minneapolis City Council has only had six other Black members. During the 2017 election, three Black council members won their races. She was elected vice president of City Council by her fellow councilors shortly after her election. Since then, she has also served as chair of the new Race Equity Subcommittee and helped create a Racial Equity Community Advisory Committee consisting of city residents.

The 8th Ward that Jenkins represents includes the 38th Street and Chicago Avenue intersection where George Floyd was murdered by a Minneapolis police officer on May 25, 2020. Despite initially supporting abolishment of the Minneapolis Police Department following the murder of George Floyd, Jenkins later decided, following a wave of shootings, that the police should keep doing their work in the city. But she also said Minneapolis "should focus on creating more schools, housing and other services that prevent people from pursuing crime or turning to violence".

Jenkins was reelected to the Minneapolis City Council in November 2021, and was named City Council President on January 10, 2022, in a unanimous vote. She did not seek reelection in 2025, and retired after her third term in office ended on January 5, 2026.

==== Vehicle blocking incident ====
On June 27, 2021, Jenkins, the vice president of the Minneapolis City Council, was involved in a confrontation with racial justice activists at a Pride event in downtown Minneapolis. A group that included Donald Hooker Jr, a leader with Twin Cities Coalition for Justice 4 Jamar (referring to Jamar Clark), blocked the car Jenkins was a passenger in for several hours and presented a list of six demands that Jenkins was asked to sign her agreement to. The demands include dropping charges against protesters in recent demonstrations, calling for the immediate resignation of Minneapolis Mayor Jacob Frey, continuing the closure of George Floyd Square, and providing more information about investigations of recent police killings. After Jenkins signed the agreement, activists moved out of the way to allow the vehicle to drive away. Hooker posted a 23-minute video of part of the encounter to Facebook. In a statement about the incident, Jenkins said she was treated inhumanely and held against her will by the demonstrators. The editorial board of the Star Tribune newspaper criticized what is described as attempted intimidation of Jenkins and compared aspects of the blocking incident to the 2021 United States Capitol attack.

== Media recognition ==
In 2010, Jenkins won the Naked Stages grant from the Jerome Foundation and Pillsbury House Theater. She created "Body Parts: Reflections on Reflections".

Jenkins was one of several dozen women featured on the January 29, 2018, Time cover. The article was about the many women who ran for office in 2017 and 2018. Five of the women featured were lesbian and transgender candidates, all recipients of money from the LGBTQ Victory Fund.

In June 2020, in honor of the 50th anniversary of the first LGBTQ pride parade, Queerty named her among the fifty heroes "leading the nation toward equality, acceptance, and dignity for all people". She was included in the 2022 Fast Company Queer 50 list.

== Personal life ==
Jenkins is a performance artist, poet, and writer who is bisexual and queer. She is a grandmother. Her own mother now lives in Ward 8. She has a partner of eight years. Jenkins was diagnosed with multiple sclerosis in 2017.

She has participated in the Trans Lives Matter movement and chaired the board of Intermedia Arts. In 2015, Jenkins was grand marshal of the Twin Cities Pride Parade. Jenkins has cited Barack Obama, Harold Washington, the Black Panther Party, Jeremiah Wright, and Jesse Jackson as having influenced her to be involved with politics.

== Bibliography ==
- Jenkins, Andrea (2006). Tributaries: Poems Exploring Black History. Minneapolis, MN: Purple Lioness Publications.
- Jenkins, Andrea (November 18, 2015). The T is Not Silent: new and selected poems. Purple Lioness Productions. p. 86. ISBN 978-0692578407.
- Jenkins, Andrea (April 1, 2016). "The Price We Pay: How Race and Gender Identity Converge". In Sun Yung Shin (ed.). A Good Time for the Truth: Race in Minnesota. Minnesota Historical Society Press. ASIN B01N31BJTX.

== See also ==
- 2020–2021 Minneapolis–Saint Paul racial unrest
- Police abolition movement in Minneapolis
- List of transgender public officeholders in the United States
