= Children's Literature Research Collection =

Children's Literature Research Collection may refer to:

- Children's Literature Research Collection (Adelaide), at the State Library of South Australia, Adelaide
- Children's Literature Research Collection (Minneapolis), at the University of Minnesota Libraries, United States
