= Elizabeth Glidden =

Lawyer, public policy professional, and academic

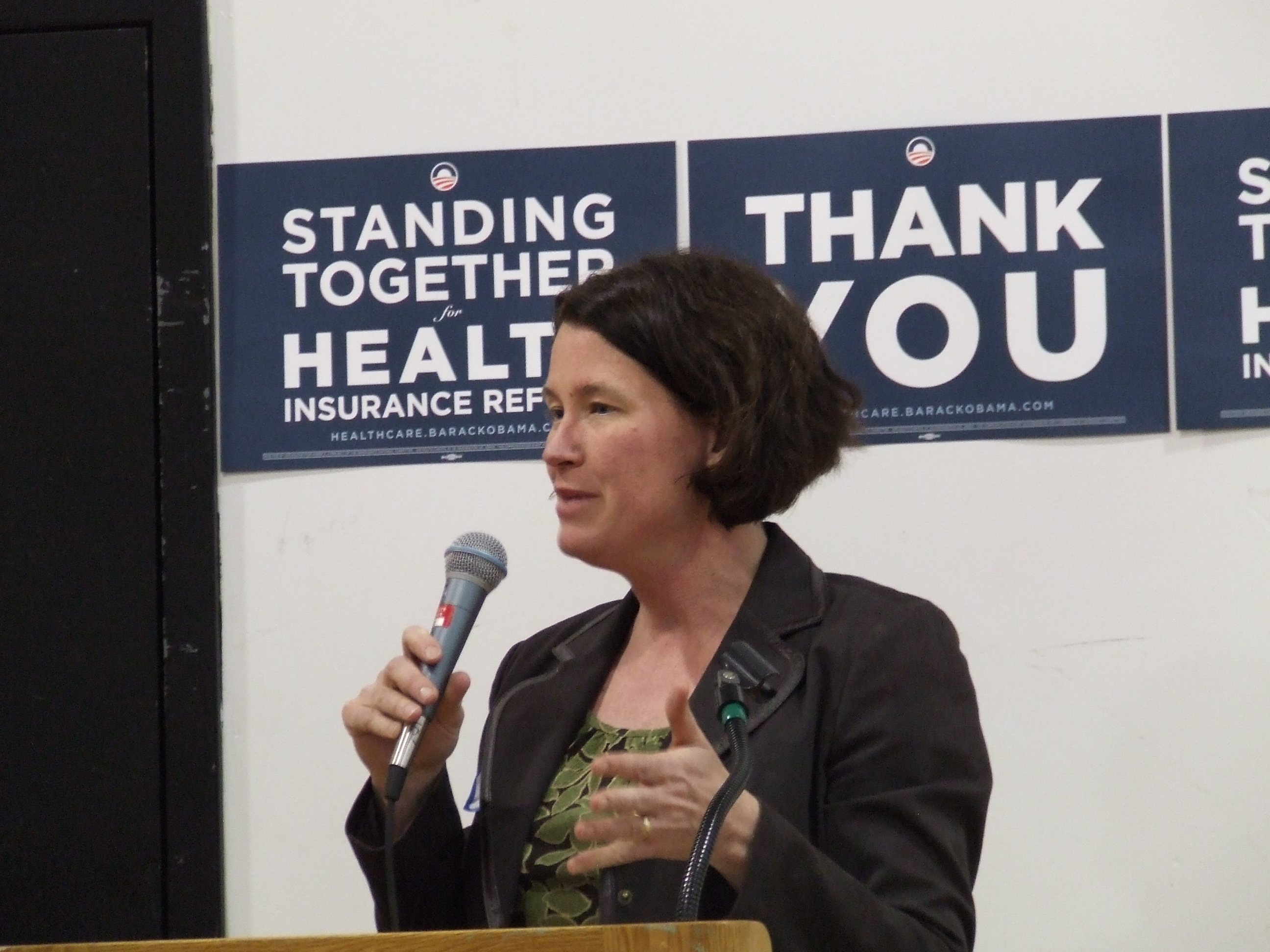

Vice President of the Minneapolis City Council
- In office 2013–2018
- Succeeded by: Andrea Jenkins

Member of the Minneapolis City Council from the 8th ward
- In office 2006–2018
- Succeeded by: Andrea Jenkins

Personal details
- Born: Saint Paul, Minnesota, U.S.
- Party: Democratic
- Spouse: Eric
- Children: 2
- Education: Augustana University; University of Iowa; University of Minnesota

Elizabeth Glidden is a lawyer, public policy professional, adjunct faculty at Humphrey School of Public Affairs in Minnesota, and former member of the Minneapolis City Council. She is the Director of Public Policy and Strategic Initiatives for the Minnesota Housing Partnership, "working on housing policy at the federal, state, and local levels."

== Early life ==
Glidden was born in Saint Paul, Minnesota but grew up in Wichita, Kansas. She received her undergrad from Augustana University before completing a Juris Doctor degree at University of Iowa College of Law. Later, she completed a master's degree at Humphrey School of Public Affairs.

== Career ==
Glidden worked as an employment and civil rights lawyer for over a decade.

In 2005, Glidden ran for Minneapolis City Council to represent the 8th ward. The 8th ward is located in South Minneapolis and encompasses the Lyndale, Kingfield, Bryant, Bancroft, Regina and Field neighborhoods. Her husband served as her campaign manager and the campaign began shortly after they returned from their honeymoon. She won and served three terms, including serving as City Council Vice President from 2013 to 2017.

In 2017, she chose not to run for reelection. She cited leaving because it was time for a new face and she was impressed with the other progressive candidates who were running, including her former policy aide Andrea Jenkins who ultimately won the seat. On this decision, she said, "I personally believe that these are not forever jobs. Part of the excitement of local politics is the opportunity for change and new ideas and new energy and all the things that can come with having someone new in this seat. ... I knew also that there were multiple fantastic candidates out there, who had progressive values, who had a similar outlook to me, although they would have different background and experiences and bring a different outlet to maybe just doing the job. And at the end of the day, Andrea Jenkins, when she announced she kind of cleared the field, I think because of the very special candidate that she is. The longer sometimes you hold on, it's harder for some of those people to enter."

She did not support Jacob Frey in his successful mayoral election in 2017. Minneapolis uses ranked voting, a policy she advocated for, and she made a public statement listing her choices. They did not always agree when working together on the city council, but she has said there was "never a hard word exchanged between us of a personal nature." She was an active supporter of the $15 minimum wage movement in Minneapolis and considers it one of her greatest accomplishments as a city council member.

In 2018, Glidden became Director of Strategic Initiatives and Policy at the Minnesota Housing Project, an organization striving to "improve the quality, affordability and availability of housing in Minnesota and beyond."

Glidden was a recipient of the Equal Justice Award from the Council on Crime and Justice (2011) and an American Marshall Memorial Fellow (2004). In 2013, she was a Bush fellow for 24 months, working "to offer local elected leaders the skills, tools and competencies they need to tackle racism in a way that leads to substantive public policy change." This fellowship included a two-week trip to Brazil to "explore ways city leaders can have an impact on reducing racial disparities."

== Personal life ==
She lives in the Kingfield neighborhood of Minneapolis with her husband Eric and two young daughters. She teaches violin and plays in the Civic Orchestra of Minneapolis.
