= Tretter (surname) =

Tretter is a German and Austrian surname. Notable people with the surname include:

- Christiane Tretter (born 1964), German mathematician
- Felix Tretter (born 1949), Austrian psychiatrist, psychologist and cyberneticisn
- Hannes Tretter (1951–2025), Austrian lawyer and human rights expert
- J. C. Tretter (born 1991), American football player
- Jean-Nickolaus Tretter (1946–2022), American activist and LGBT archivist
