= Twin Cities Pride =

Nonprofit organization in Minnesota, US

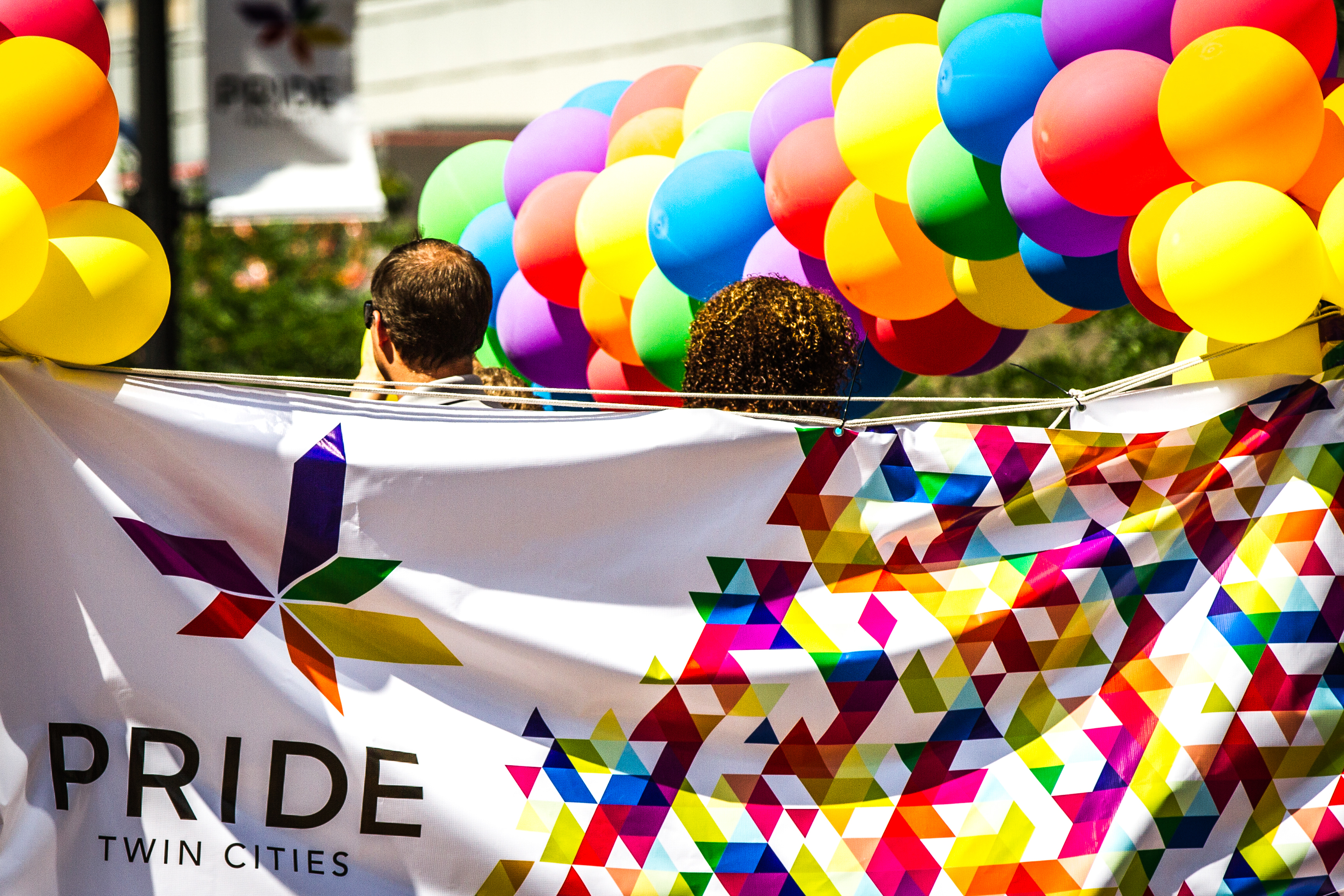
- Parade banner (2012).
- Frequency: Annually in June
- Locations: Minneapolis, Minnesota
- Attendance: 600,000
- Website: tcpride.org

Twin Cities Pride, sometimes Twin Cities LGBTQ Pride, is an American nonprofit organization in Minnesota that hosts an annual celebration each June that focuses on the LGBTQ community. The celebration features a pride parade which draws crowds of nearly 600,000 people. The parade was designated the Ashley Rukes GLBT Pride Parade in honor of the late former parade organizer and transgender LGBTQ rights activist. Other Twin Cities Pride events include a festival in Loring Park and a block party spanning multiple days.

== History ==
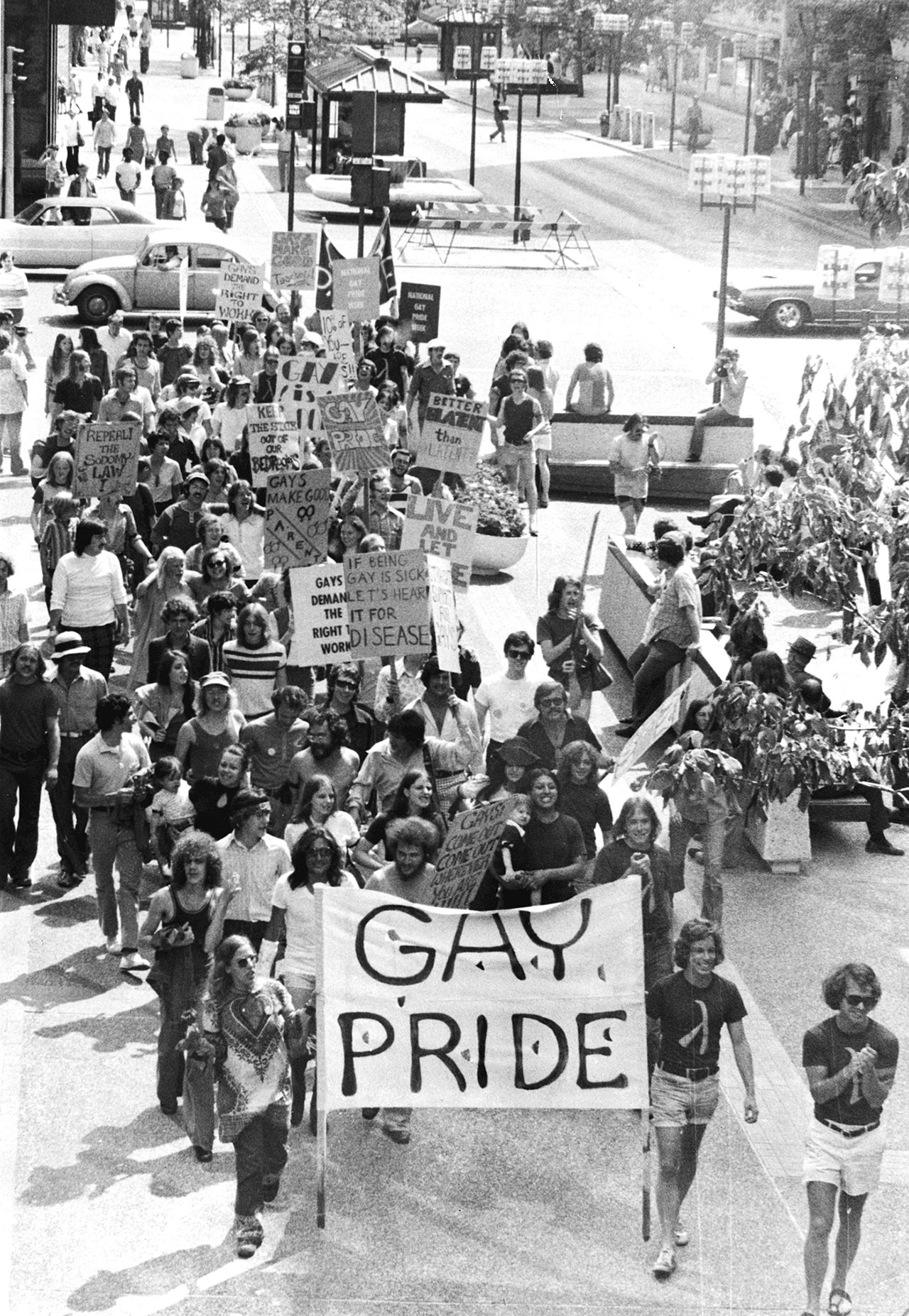
A 1973 march in Minneapolis for 'Gay Pride'

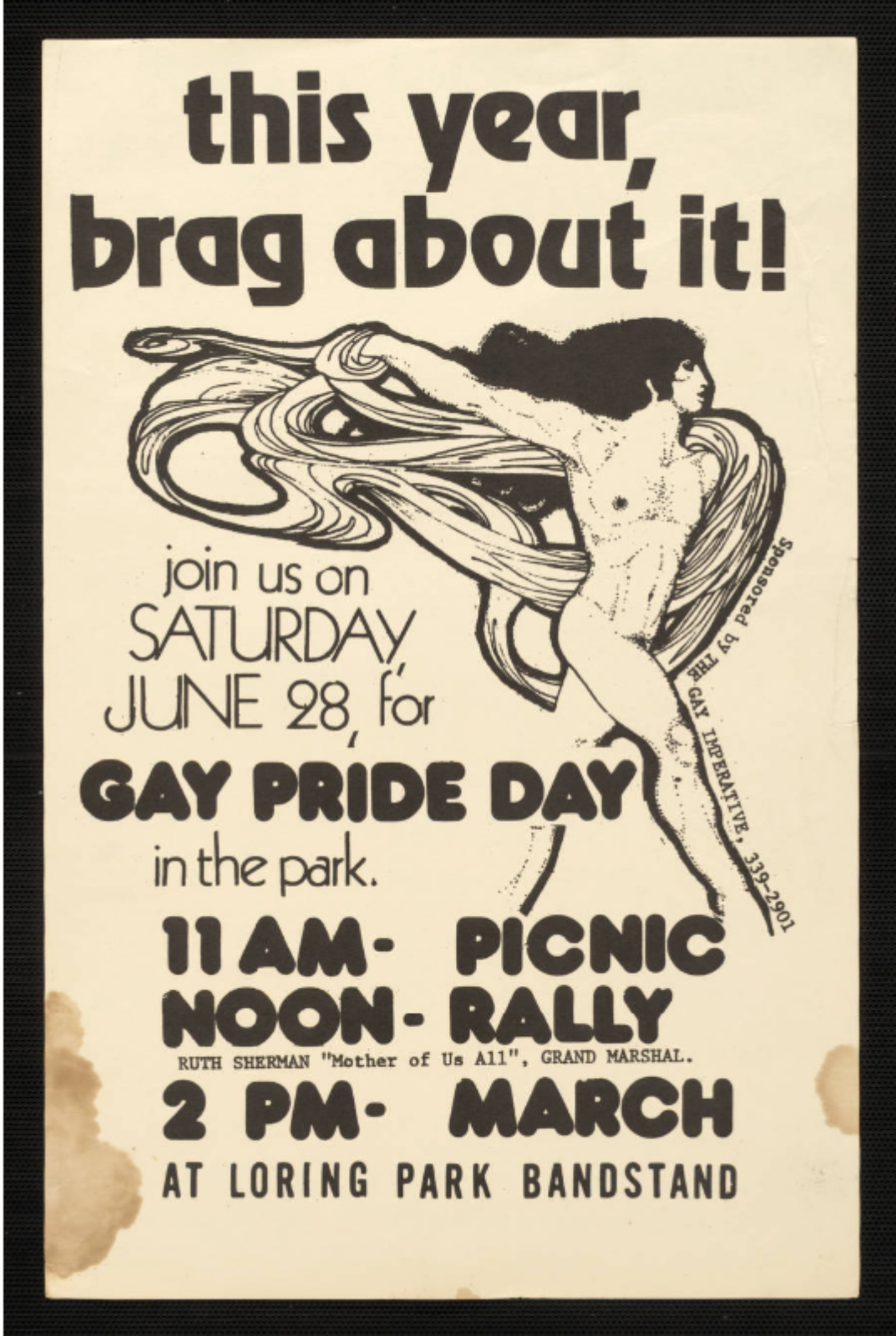
Gay Pride Day Poster, June 28, 1975

The Twin Cities Pride festival arose from a 50-person protest 1972 protest march in Minneapolis on the Nicollet Mall in downtown Minneapolis, commemorating the third anniversary of the Stonewall riots. In 1973 pride events in Minnesota consisted of a "Gay Pride Week" including a picnic, a march, a dance, a softball game, and canoeing, featuring 150 attendees. 1974's pride event included the first transgender speaker.

In 1981 the name was changed to "Lesbian-Gay Pride." However, Stewart Van Cleve argued that "there was a lot of sexism at the time towards women, in a lot of LGBTQ+ organizations," and "Lesbian" was removed from the title changing the name back to "Gay Pride" in 1982. Tensions emerged after conflicts between gay men and lesbians during the anti-pornography movement in Minneapolis. Gay men perceived anti-pornography radical feminist lesbians to be supporting police crackdowns on pornography stores in Central Minneapolis and Powderhorn Park, which were popular cruising spots for gay men. Many lesbians experienced misogyny from gay men, who downplayed lesbian identity and ignored women’s issues within the gay rights movement. This led to a split in celebrations and the formation of an independent Lesbian Pride celebration at Powderhorn Park in Minneapolis.

In 1983, the two events reunified to form "Lesbian and Gay Pride" and was accompanied by the historic closure of a Minneapolis street for the Parade. Scholar Pamela Butler cited the need for "respectability" during the AIDS crisis as a reason for the groups' increased collaboration. Later during the crisis, in 1985, Pride organizers attempted to charge an entrance fee to the festival sparking public backlash.

The 1990s saw expansion of Twin Cities Pride activities, including vendor stalls and non-profit booths. The name of the organization was officially changed to "The Gay, Lesbian, Bisexual, and Transgender Pride Committee" in 1993, one of the first pride event organizations to add bisexual and transgender to its name. Multiple music stages were added in the mid-1990s; attendance in 1995 reached 100,000.

=== 2010s ===
Events organized in June by Twin Cities Pride in the mid-2010s include family picnics, music concerts, a 5K run, and a festival featuring hundreds of exhibitors and vendors. Protests in 2017 and 2018 highlighted ongoing tensions around police involvement in the parade. In 2017, a group of Black Lives Matter protesters briefly halted the LGBT Parade. They objected to police involvement in the parade after St. Anthony, MN, police officer Jeronimo Yanez's recent acquittal of killing of Philando Castile. In response to the protest, officers marched midway through the parade rather than at the front as planned. Twin Cities Pride parades now attract almost 400,000 viewers in its route along Hennepin Avenue in downtown Minneapolis. In 2018, a protest delayed the parade by an hour.

=== 2020s ===
In the wake of the murder of George Floyd in 2020 by Minneapolis police, the Twin Cities Pride festival faced controversy regarding police presence in the parade. Organizers cancelled their virtual event and endorsed an alternate "Taking Back Pride" march centering Black transgender people and protesting police involvement. This action reflected tensions within the LGBTQ+ community. Some felt traditional Pride celebrations did not adequately address police brutality against Black people, particularly Black LGBTQ+ individuals. The controversy highlighted the complex relationship between LGBTQ+ liberation and broader social justice movements.

In 2025, the festival dropped Target as a sponsor after they announced that they would drop their anti-discrimination efforts and other diversity, equity, and inclusion policies. Target had been a sponsor of the event for eighteen years prior to the decision.

== Archives ==
The archives of Twin Cities Pride, along with material from Twin Cities-area LGBT activists and Pride festival attendees, are held in the Jean-Nickolaus Tretter Collection in Gay, Lesbian, Bisexual and Transgender Studies at the University of Minnesota Libraries.

== Gallery ==
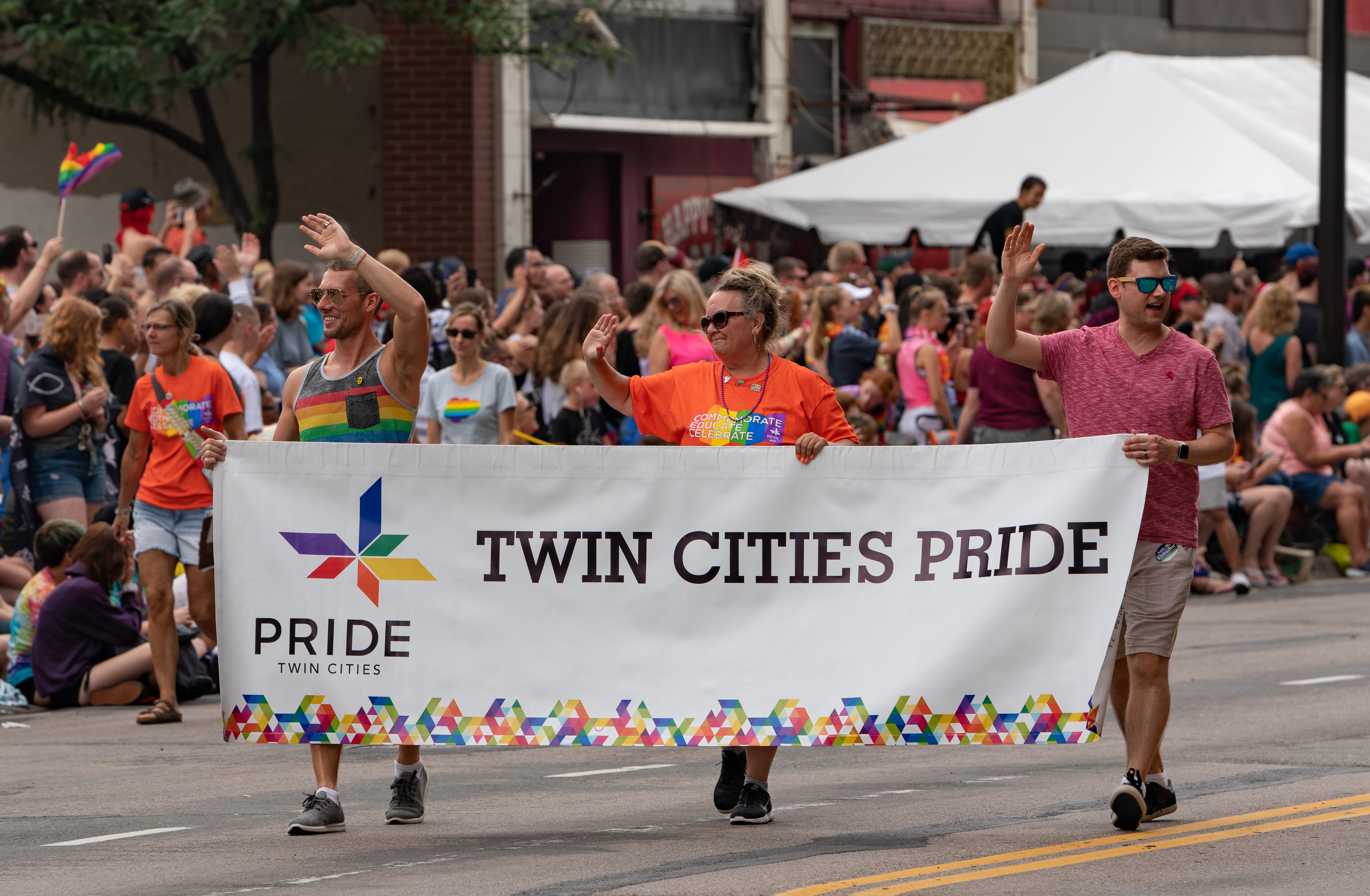
Twin Cities Pride banner, 2018

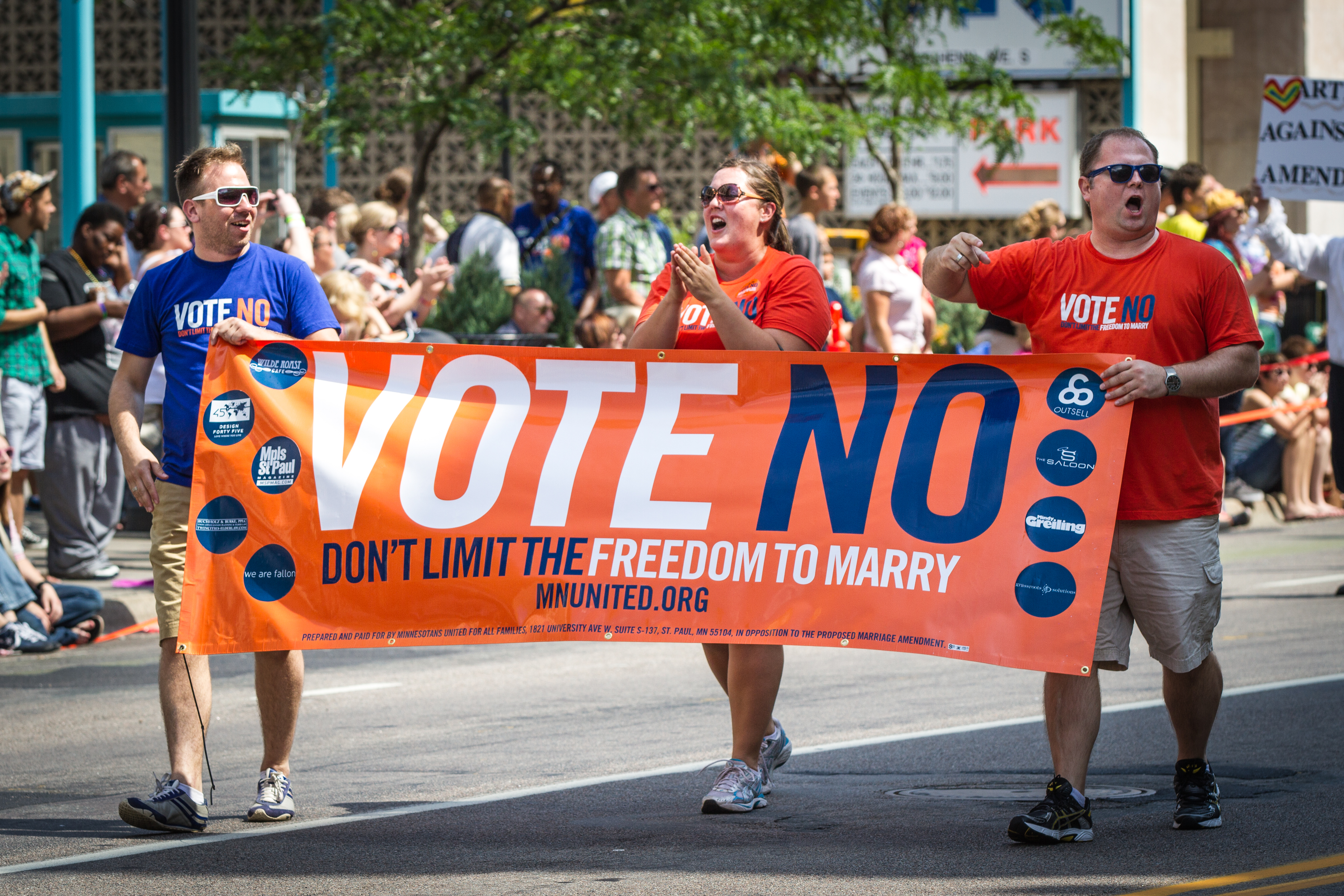
'VOTE NO Don't Limit the Freedom to Marry' banner, 2012

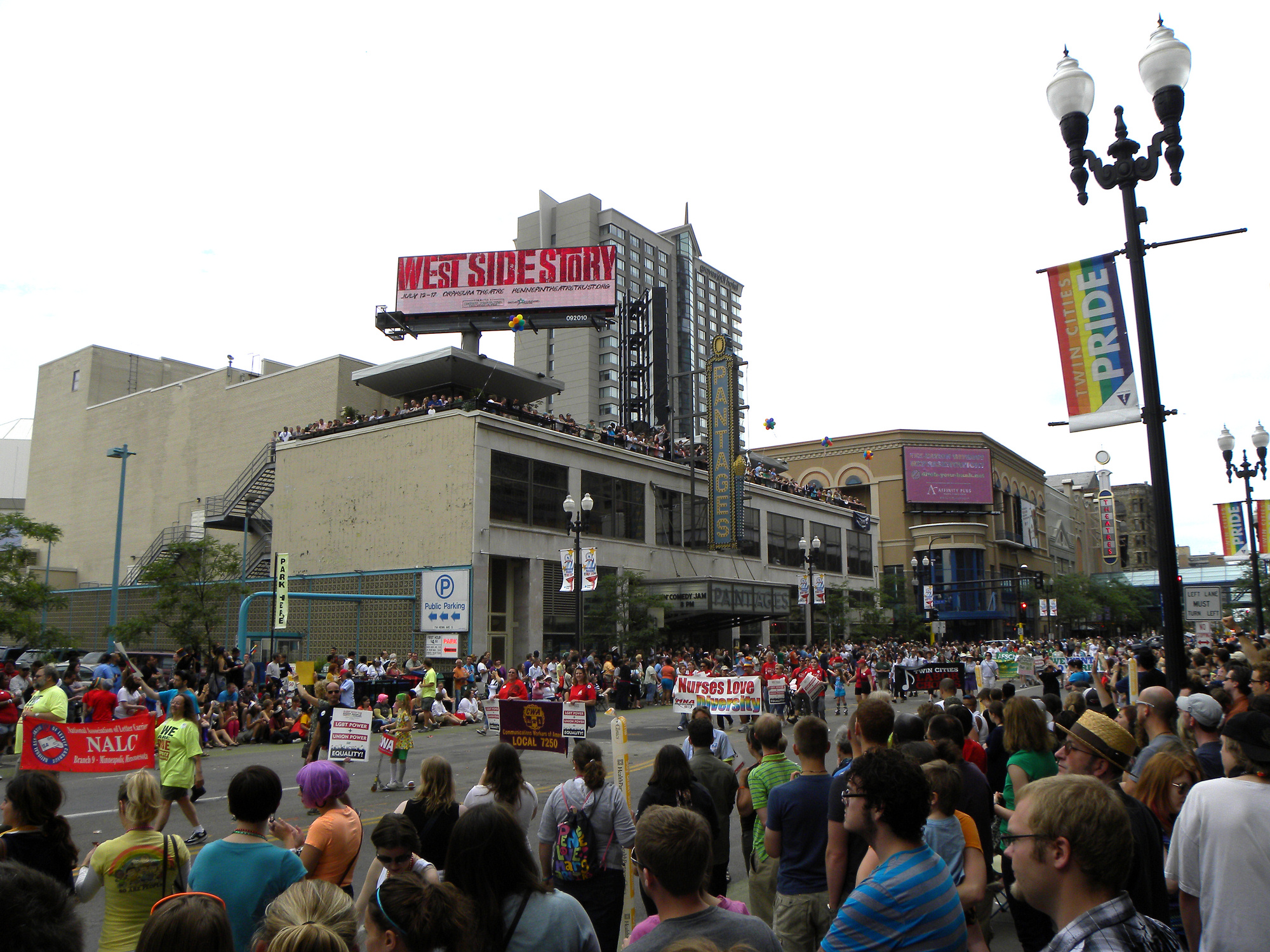
Pride Parade, Hennepin Ave, 2011

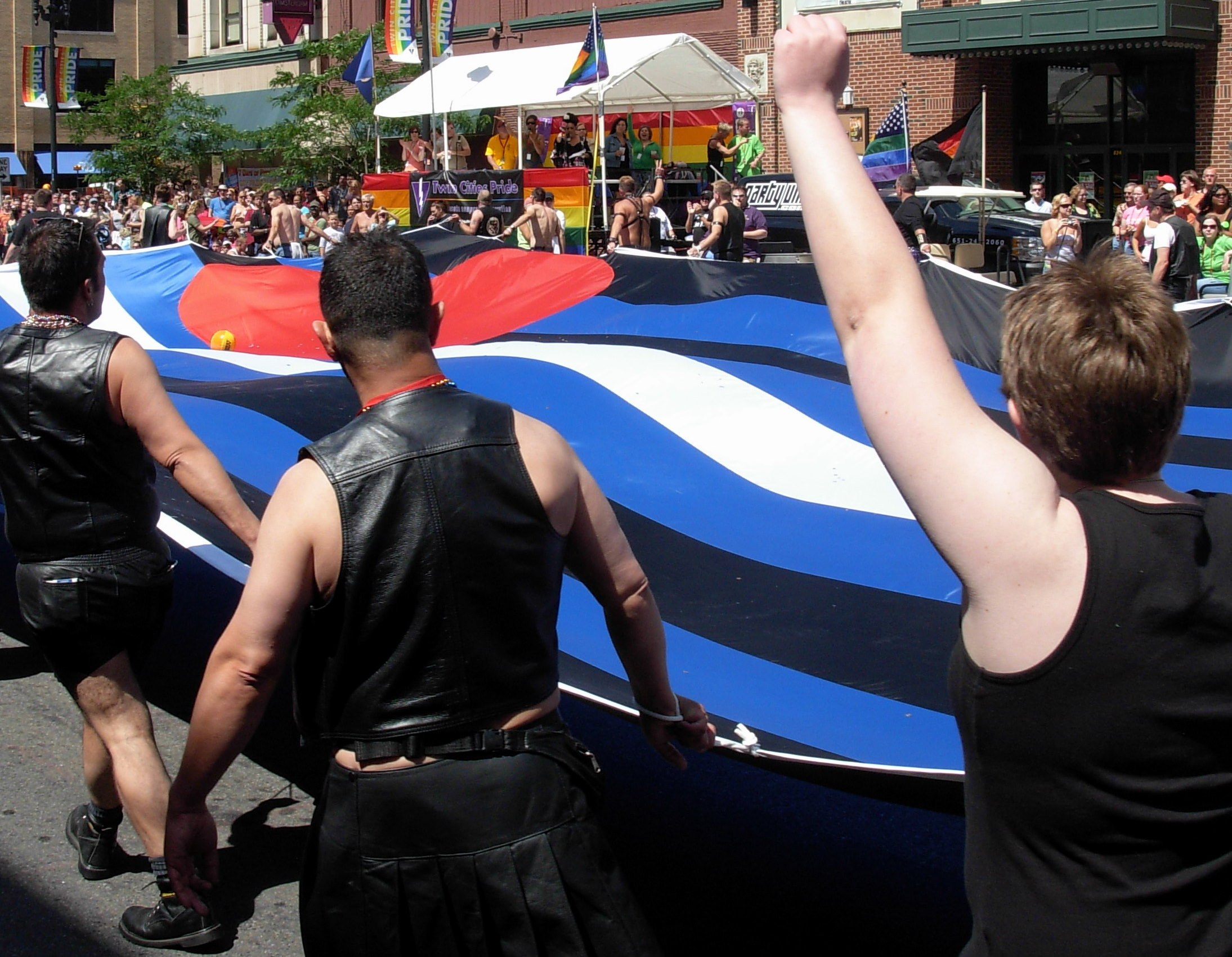
Marchers carrying large leather pride flag, 2008

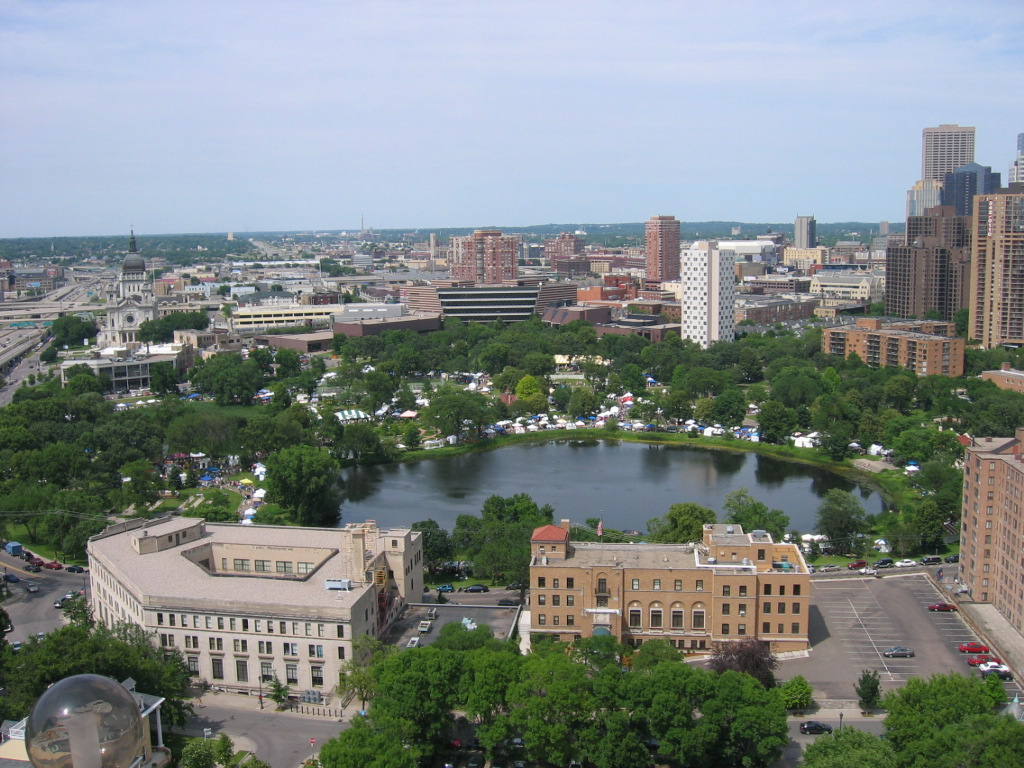
Loring Park aerial during pride festival, 2005

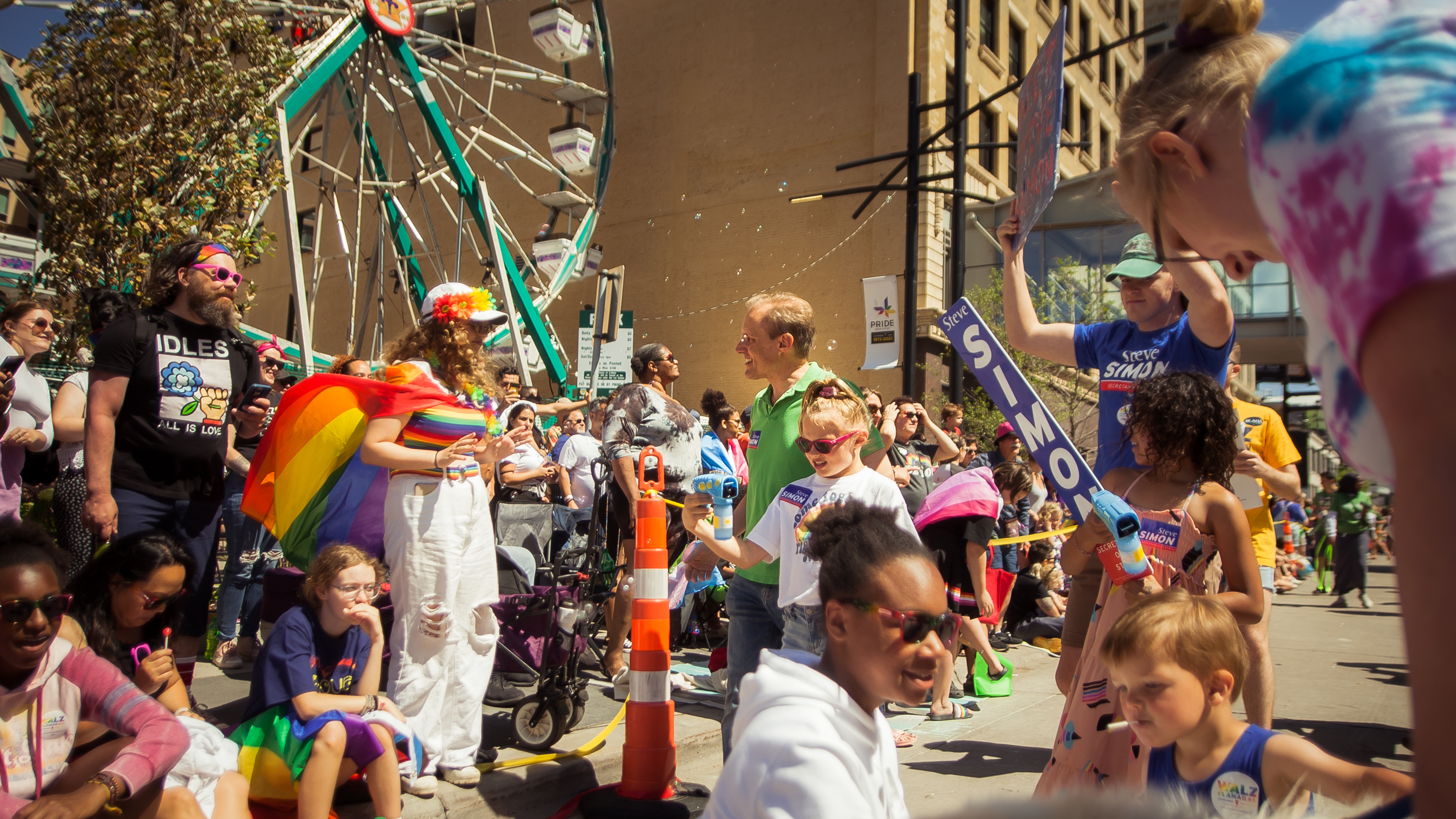
Pride parade with ferris wheel in background, 2022

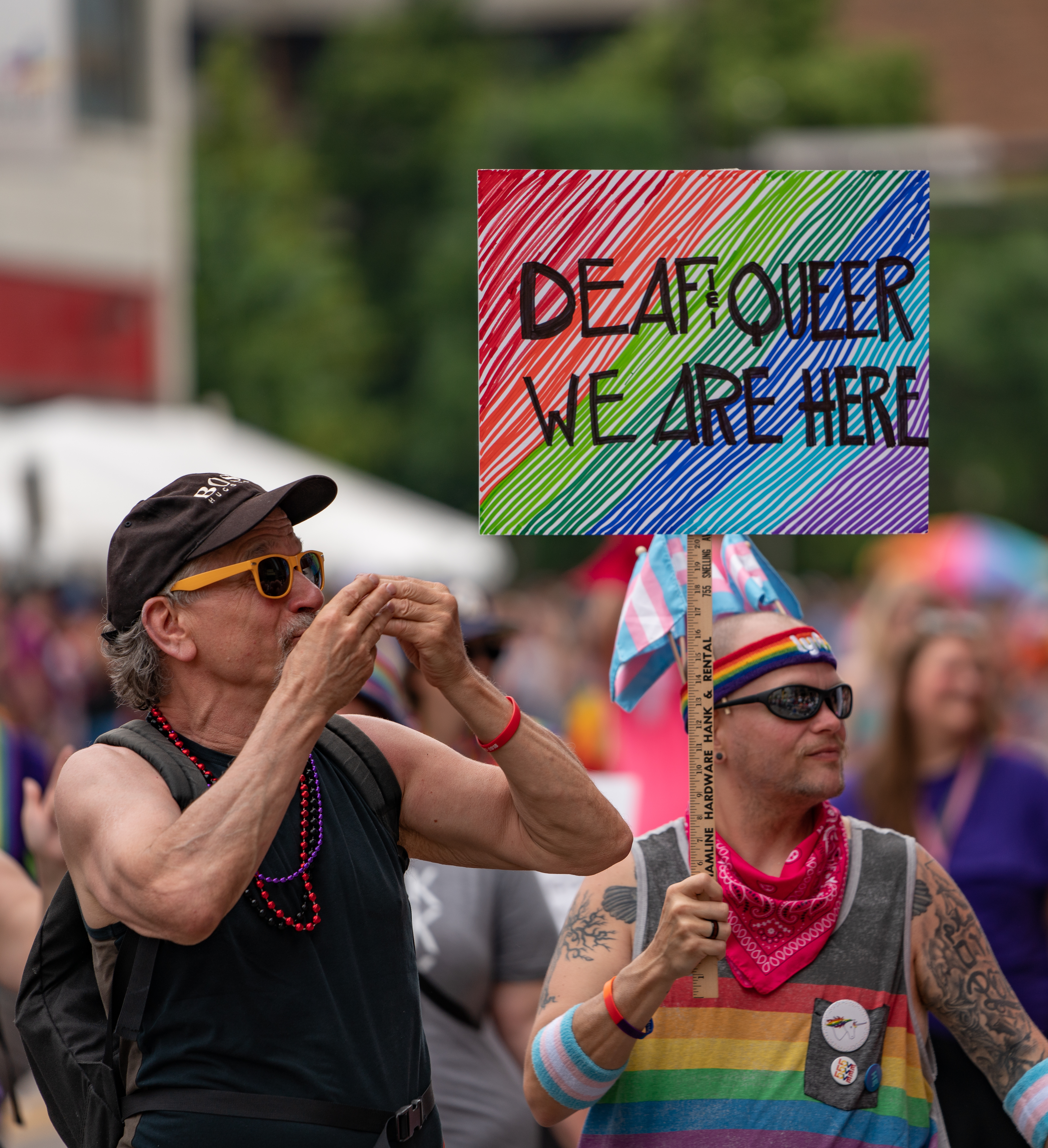
'Deaf and Queer, We Are Here' sign, 2018

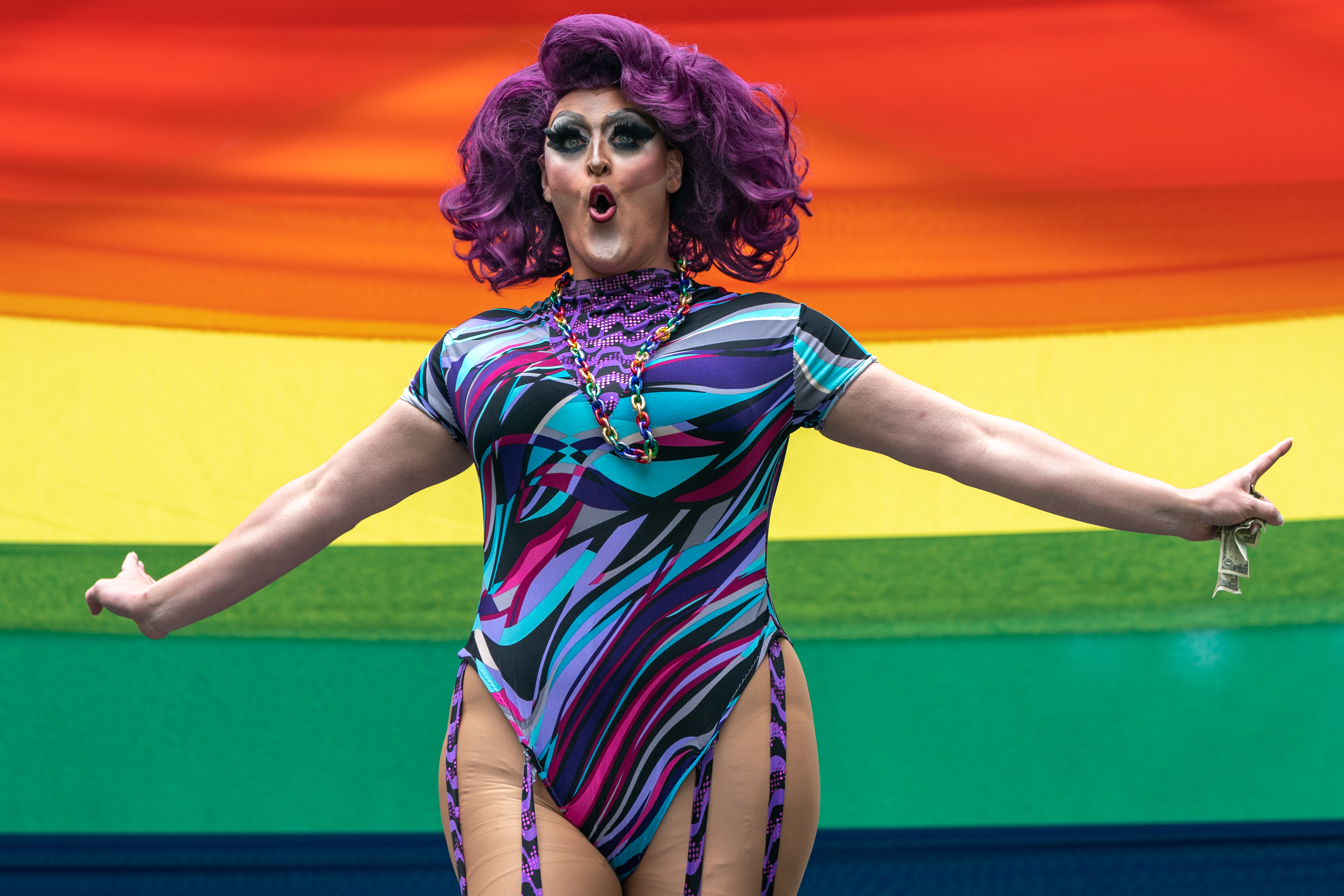
Drag queen, Allota Shots, on the Stonewall Stage, 2018
