= Jean-Nickolaus Tretter =

American LGBTQ archivist (1946–2022)

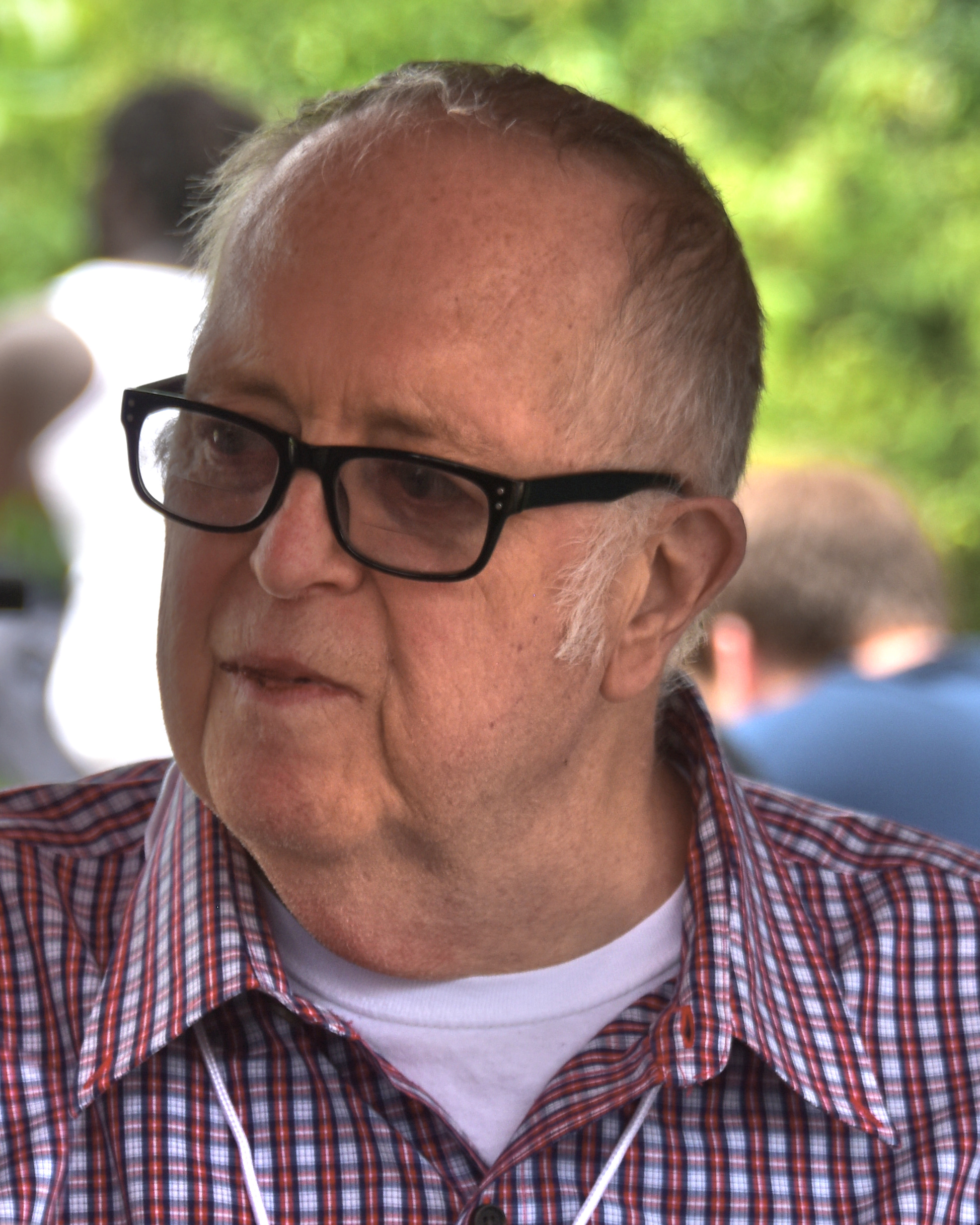
- Tretter in 2018
- Born: 1946
- Died: December 9, 2022; St. Paul, Minnesota
- Education: University of Minnesota (incomplete)
- Occupations: Archivist, LGBT activist
- Notable work: Jean-Nickolaus Tretter Collection at the University of Minnesota

Jean-Nickolaus Tretter (1946 – December 9, 2022) was an American activist and LGBT archivist who created the Jean-Nickolaus Tretter Collection in Gay, Lesbian, Bisexual and Transgender Studies, housed by the University of Minnesota.

Tretter was also the host of KFAI radio show Night Rivers, and the co-chair of the Minnesota Gay and Lesbian Olympic Committee. He co-organised the first Twin Cities commemoration of the Stonewall Riots in 1972.

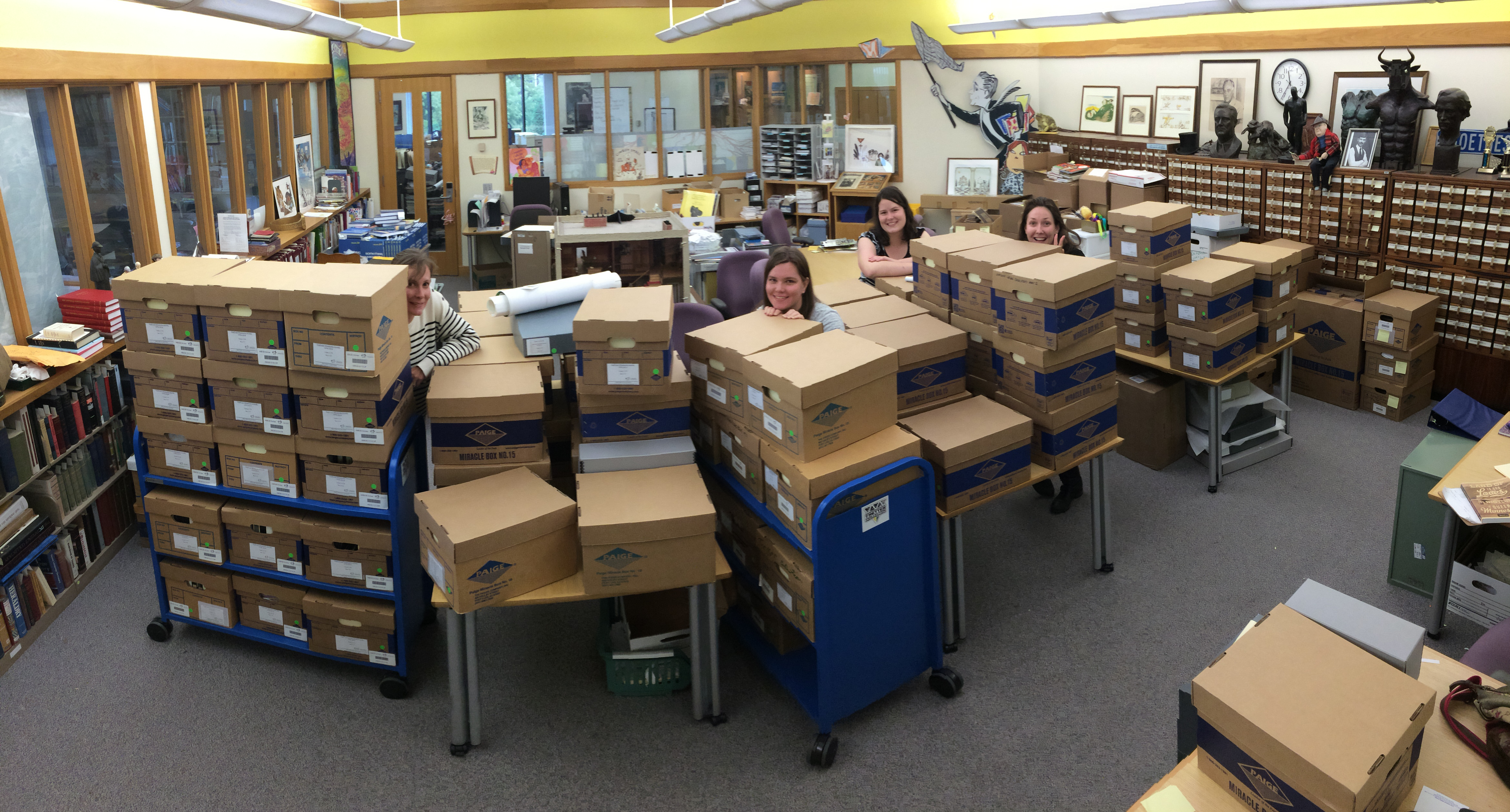
Staff organising the Jean-Nickolaus Tretter Collection

== Early life, education and military service ==
Tretter in 1992

Tretter grew up in Little Falls, Minnesota and studied initially linguistics. His family had arrived in Morrison County in 1848.

After graduating, Tretter served with the U.S. Navy in the Vietnam War. From 1973, he studied cultural anthropology at the University of Minnesota, although faculty prevented him from focusing his studies on lesbian and gay anthropology. Tretter dropped out of university in 1976.

== Career and activism ==
After dropping out of university, Tretter worked at a home in Ramsey County for people with disabilities, while also undertaking private study on gay and lesbian history.

He spent sixteen years as the producer and host of the gay and lesbian classical radio show Night Rivers, hosted on KFAI radio.

In 1972, Tretter and his friends organised the first Twin Cities commemoration of the Stonewall riots. Around the same time, he started collecting LGBT themed items.

In 1982, Tretter became the co-chair of the Minnesota Gay and Lesbian Olympic Committee. The committee sent the third biggest delegation to the games and Tretter arranged for the torch run to pass through the Twin Cities.

In 1983 Tretter created a gay history exhibit at St. Paul's Landmark Center. Tretter helped to develop the LGBTQ+ scene in Minneapolis, including establishing Twin Cities Pride, co-founding the Minnesota Committee for Gay Rights, and serving as manager of the Noble Roman and other gay bars across the Twin Cities.

Tretter's LGBT collection grew over the decades and he donated it to the Andersen Library in Minnesota in 2000. He worked as an archivist at the collection until retirement in 2011. Post-retirement he served on an advisory board and supported academics focusing on LGBT history.

== Personal life and death ==
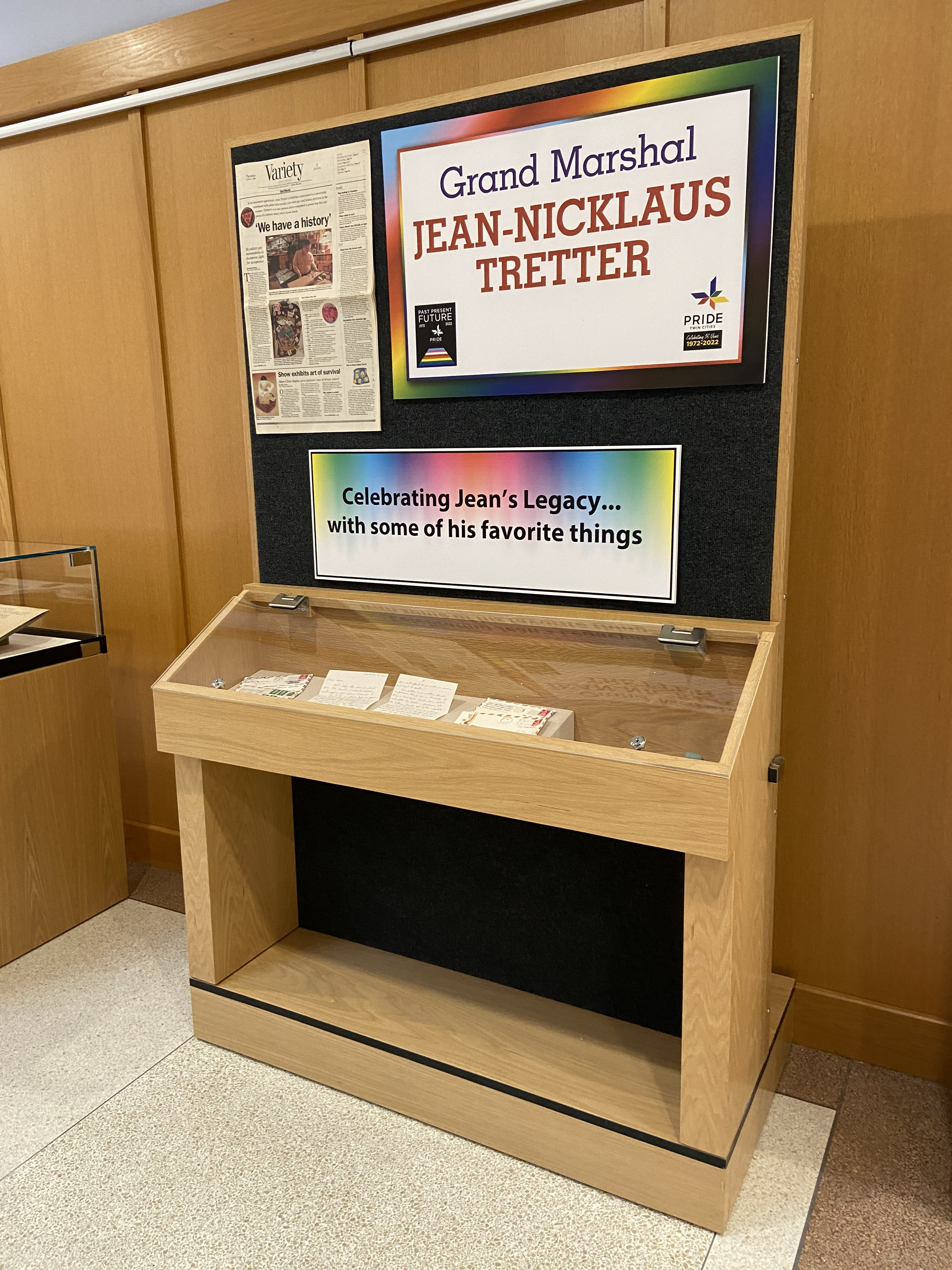
Display at memorial service at the Elmer L. Andersen Library

Tretter came out as gay in the early 1970s, after leaving the Navy.

He died in Saint Paul, Minnesota, on December 9, 2022, at the age of 76.
