= Quatrefoil: A Modern Novel =

1950 novel about gay men

- First U.S. hardcover edition (1950)
- Author: James Barr
- Language: English
- Publication date: 1950
- Pages: 321
- ISBN: 978-1-78-720064-7
- LC Class: PZ3.B2715 Qat

Quatrefoil: A Modern Novel, sometimes called Quatrefoil, is a novel about gay men written in 1950 by James W. Fugaté under the pen name James Barr. It is known for being the first modern book to portray homosexuality in a positive way. The main character, Phillip, is based on a college fraternity brother that the author had an affair with while in college.

Quatrefoil has been translated into French and German.

Its initial release was accompanied by a marketing campaign which included distribution of free copies to more than seventy-five gay bars in the United States and Canada. It was rumored to have outsold Gore Vidal's The City and the Pillar and Truman Capote's Other Voices, Other Rooms, two other prominent gay-themed novels of the time.

== Plot ==
Quatrefoil tells the story of a naval officer and banker named Phillip Froelich who is engaged to be married to a woman named Sybel Jo. While under investigation by court-martial by the Navy in 1946, he meets and is assisted by Tim Danelaw, a superior officer. While Phillip is increasing drawn to Tim, Phillip acts out his confusion by having a one-time affair with Tim's wife Pam. However, after sitting for a portrait by Tim, Phillip is drawn closer to Tim and finds out that Pam and Tim are going through a divorce. An affair with Tim causes Phillip to confront his closeted homosexuality. They become lovers. They are stereotypical masculine and intellectual characters who discuss art and philosophy, and thus are contrasted (favorably according to the text) with behaviors of "the average homosexual" of the time who would be effeminate. Phillip wrestles with his feelings and thoughts of his future, and the choice between living a stable life running his family's bank, or pursuing his newfound feelings for Tim. When Tim goes to Phillip's hometown of Devereux, Oklahoma, and meets Phillip's family, his family is embracing. Phillip's sister even encourages him to forsake the life expected of him to follow Tim. While in Oklahoma, Tim finds out Sybel Jo's family secret that has been hidden: the family is recently broke and is merely looking to quickly marry into the Froelichs for financial security. With this revelation, Phillip breaks off the engagement with Sybel Jo, and decides to be with Tim. However, at the end, just as Tim and Phillip are to be securely united and travel the world, Tim is killed in a plane crash.

== Recognition ==
The novel presents an example of how gay men kept their homosexuality hidden in the 1950s. It has been admired as a work that portrayed the main characters as people who grew in self confidence, which differentiated the novel from other gay literature of the time portraying homosexual men as campy. Most gay works at the time had ended with either suicide or murder out of self-loathing, another tradition broken by Quatrefoil, though Tim still dies.

== See also ==
- Quatrefoil, a decorative element
- Quatrefoil Library, which was named for the novel
- Lost Gay Novels
