= Transgender Oral History Project =

The Transgender Oral History Project is an initiative by and for the transgender community. TOHP collects interviews and produces multimedia content featuring stories of transgender-identified people, and exists to empower trans folks through sharing stories of their lives. The Transgender Oral History Project is also active in the community, hosting events in many states including Massachusetts, Illinois, Iowa, Seattle, Philadelphia, and New York City.

== Goals ==
According to the official website, the Transgender Oral History Project's goals are to build community, encourage inter-generational discussion, frame contemporary issues that transgender people face within a broader context, highlight individuals, communities, and organizations struggling with trans issues that are not addressed by mainstream discourses and portray how political, social, and historical circumstances impact transgender lives.

== Founding ==
The Trans Oral History project was founded in 2009 by André Pérez and began with documenting the evolution of the first ever New England Transgender Pride March. He went on to create a multimedia exhibit entitled, "Community in Transition: 40 Years of Struggle" that incorporated archival materials from the Sexual Minorities Archives and the first set of interviews from the Transgender Oral History Project. This exhibit has been featured at Marlboro College, the University of Illinois at Chicago, and the Translating Identities Conference.

== Notable Past Projects ==
In 2010, a poster describing the Compton's Cafeteria riot was featured in the anthology, Celebrate People's History, published by the Just Seeds Collective.

In 2011, the Trans Oral History Project participated in a two-month residency at the University of Illinois, Chicago's LGBTQ Resource Center. TOHP collective members lead a participatory workshop series and created a multimedia exhibition featuring interview materials.

In 2014, I Live for Trans Education: A Youth Toolkit officially launched. I Live featured mini documentaries paired with interactive activities to teach about issues that impact the transgender community. The toolkit is a resource for trans educators, youth workers, and youth leaders to educate about issues that impact the trans community from an intersectional perspective. TOHP also began partnering with StoryCorps, the largest oral history project in North America, to record and preserve stories. A TOHP interview was featured on WBEZ in Chicago. The Trans Oral History Project now serves as a community archive for StoryCorps' recordings with transgender individuals, and is in the process of integrating those interviews into their publicly accessible digital archive of transgender stories.

== Community Events ==
Members of the Trans History Collective have also led educational workshops in community settings, academic institutions, and national conferences. The Transgender Oral History Project collaborates with other organizations in the area to host regular skills shares that teach media production skills to trans* and gender variant people.

Some of the events the Transgender Oral History Project has hosted are:

- Soapbox: A Wordpress Skill Share Chicago, IL (2012)
- Transtastic: Transgender Narratives through Web Comics Chicago, IL (2012)
- Movement Building and Breaking: An Interactive Trans History at the History Center of Tompkins County in Ithaca, NY (2012)
- Trans and Allied Community Story Share at the Philadelphia Folklore Project (2012)
- Trans History Residency at University of Illinois Chicago in Chicago, IL (2011)
- Trans and Gender Variant Inter-generational Story Share at the Allied Media Conference (2010)
- Community in Transition: 40 Years of Struggle at Marlboro College in Marlboro, VT (2009)
- Community in Transition: 40 Years of Struggle at Translating Identities Conference in Burlington, VT (2009)

== See also ==
- Jean-Nickolaus Tretter Collection in Gay, Lesbian, Bisexual and Transgender Studies, which has their own Transgender Oral History Project
