= Y's Men International =

Y's Men International is an international group of volunteers in support of YMCA. It was established in 1922 in Toledo, Ohio, U.S. and is now headquartered in Geneva, Switzerland. It was originally founded as a service club to support the work of the World Alliance of YMCAs. The first club outside North America was formed in Shanghai, China in 1924.
