= James Fugaté =

Author and gay rights activist

- Born: February 13, 1922; Oklahoma or Texas
- Died: March 28, 1995 (aged 73); Claremore, Oklahoma
- Writing career
- Pen name: James Barr
- Notable works: Quatrefoil: A Modern Novel, Derricks, Game of Fools, The Occasional Man

James Fugaté (February 13, 1922 – March 28, 1995) was an author and activist in the gay rights movement. Fugaté wrote several works under the pseudonym James Barr. He is well known for his two novels, short stories, a play, and writings in three reputable gay publications.

The Wichita State University Libraries has a special collection about Fugaté, including letters, photographs, and other artifacts.

== Life ==
Fugaté was born in an oilfield boom town and is believed to have worked as a roustabout on an oilfield. He attended college, likely at the University of Oklahoma. In 1942, he joined the United States Navy. After World War II ended, he worked in advertising until publishing his first novel, Quatrefoil: A Modern Novel, in 1950. This caused him to become known as a celebrity in the gay community, as the book was lauded as a milestone in American gay fiction, breaking the stereotype of other gay novels typical of the time. In 1952, Fugaté voluntarily returned to active duty with the Navy, and was stationed in Alaska. Later that year, his true identity as the author of Quatrefoil was revealed, which led to his being honorably discharged from the Navy. This experience marked an epiphany for Fugaté, who realized that in defending himself, he was also defending the rights of others in the gay community.

Fugaté worked as a contributing writer to ONE, Der Kreis, and Mattachine Review, writing about gay experiences and issues. In ONE, he also commented on organized religion. He later worked in newspapers in Kansas before moving to New York in the early 70s. He finally returned to Oklahoma, where he worked for ten years in a hospital before dying of liver cancer in 1995.

== Works ==
Under the pseudonym James Barr:

- Quatrefoil: A Modern Novel (1950)
- Derricks (1951)
- Game of Fools (1954)
- The Occasional Man (1966)
- Other Than a Man (1971)
