= Jean-Nickolaus Tretter Collection in Gay, Lesbian, Bisexual and Transgender Studies =

Coordinates: 44.973147°N 93.243047°W

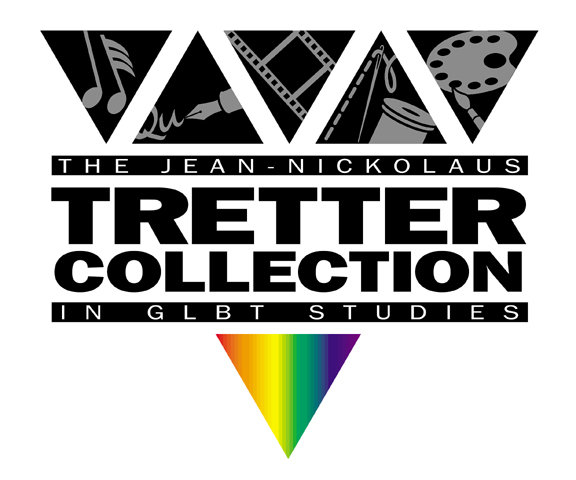

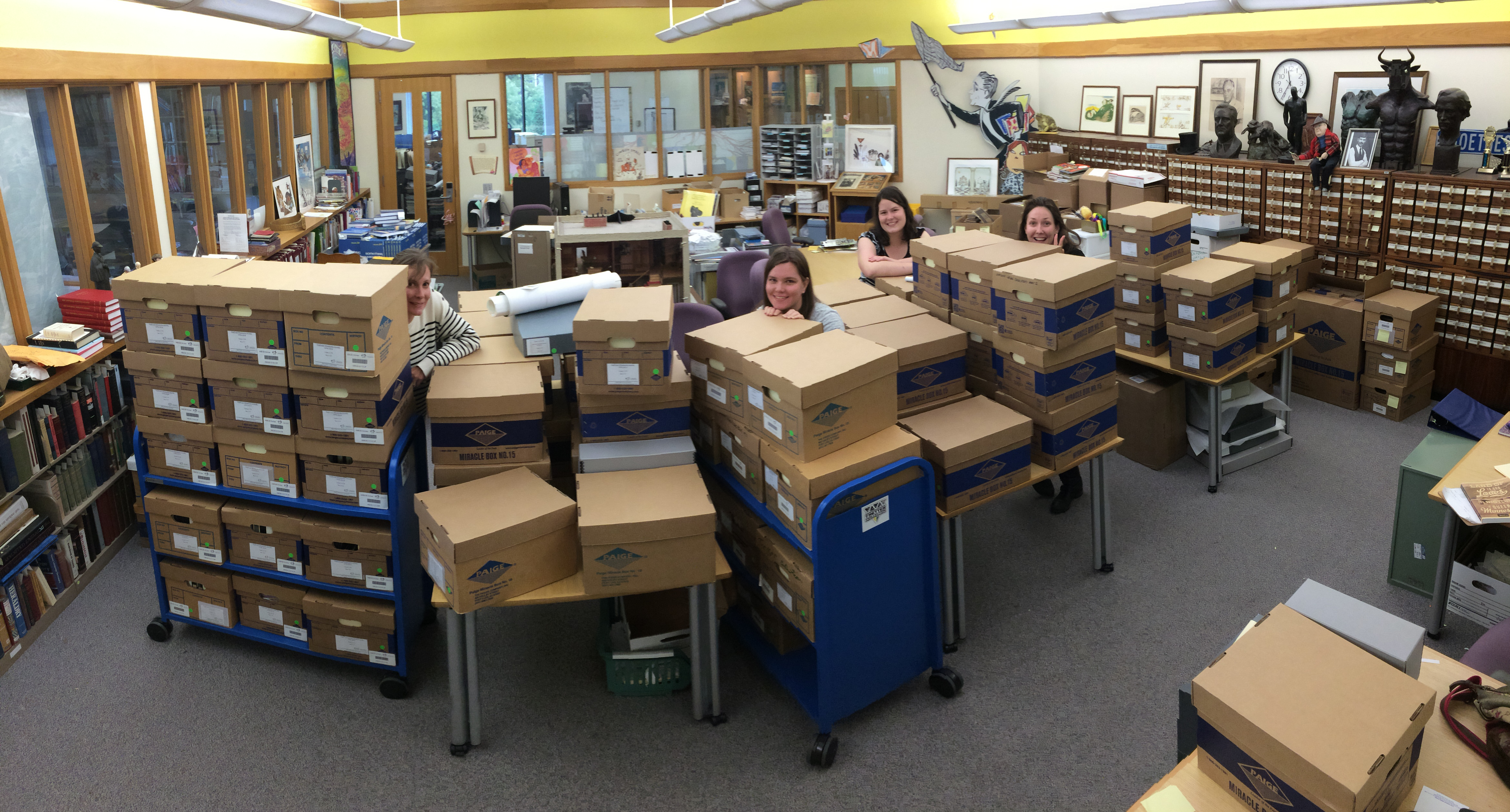
- Location: Elmer L. Andersen Library, Suite, 222 - 21st Avenue South, Minneapolis, Minnesota
- Established: 2000

Other information
- Director: Aiden Bettine
- Website: www.lib.umn.edu/tretter

The Jean-Nickolaus Tretter Collection in Gay, Lesbian, Bisexual and Transgender Studies is a collection of LGBT historical materials housed in the Special Collections and Rare Books section of the University of Minnesota Libraries. It is located underground in the Elmer L. Andersen special collections facilities on the University of Minnesota's Minneapolis campus. The Tretter Collection houses over 40,000 items, making it the largest LGBT archive in the Upper Midwest and one of the largest GLBT history collections in the United States. The collection, which was created by Jean-Nickolaus Tretter, is international in scope and is varied in media.

== Collection ==
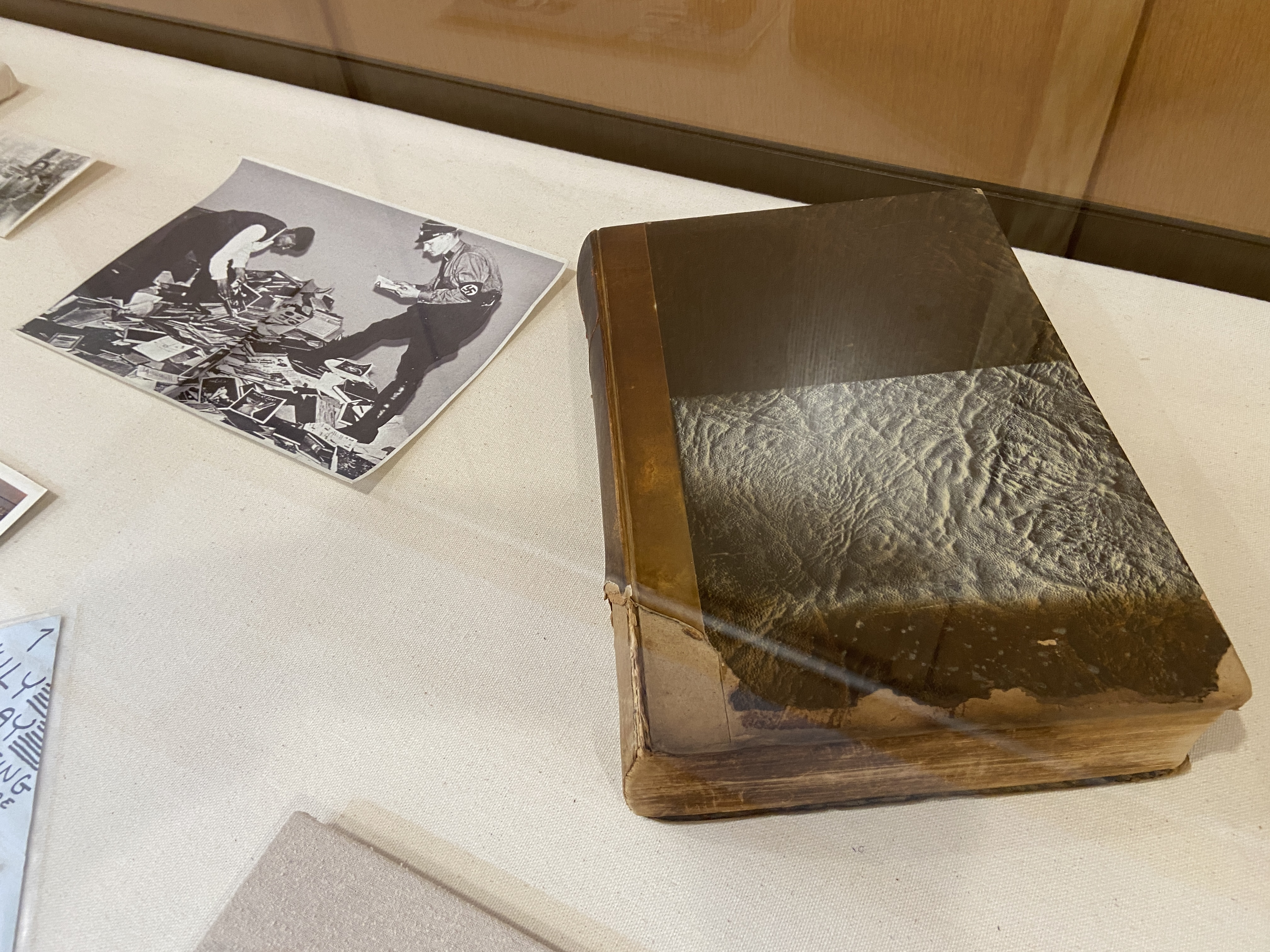
Burnt remains of book, "Le Marquis de Sade et Son Temps" which survived the Nazi book burnings of Magnus Hirschfeld's Institut für Sexualwissenschaft.

Although books are the core of the collection (including a large holding of gay pulp fiction), substantial sections include textiles, glassware, film, music, art works, and three-dimensional objects such as statuary, event buttons, and furniture. The collection includes unpublished manuscripts, vertical files, and periodicals in approximately 56 languages. Much of the material is from people and organizations in the United States during the last third of the twentieth century.

Among the significant archival holdings are:

- items from the Magnus Hirschfeld estate
- archives of the national Log Cabin Republicans
- records of the Daughters of Bilitis
- Mattachine Society records
- page proofs and layouts for six works by Andy Warhol
- archives of the National Education Association GLBT Caucus
- the personal papers of:
  - Tobias Schneebaum
  - Charles Nolte
  - Stuart Ferguson

The collection was started by Jean-Nickolaus Tretter, a Minnesota-born archivist, in the 1950s, and donated to the University of Minnesota Libraries in the early 2000s when the collection grew large enough to be a fire hazard in his home.

Selected items from the collection and timelines are frequently assembled and displayed worldwide. Recent displays have been at the Motor City Pride in Michigan in 2007 and 2009, and the first Moscow Pride festival in May 2006.

In 2005, the collection started its official newsletter, The Tretter Letter.

In 2006, The Tretter Collection, the University of Minnesota Libraries, and the Quatrefoil Library presented the first GLBT ALMS (Archives, Libraries, Museums and Special Collections) Conference in Minneapolis.

== Tretter Transgender Oral History Project ==
The Tretter Transgender Oral History Project (TTOHP) is a special collection of the Tretter Collection dedicated to preserving transgender life histories in the United States. The interviews are available in English, and access to the recordings and transcripts is public and free.

The TTOHP was founded in 2015 by Andrea Jenkins who sought to shift the public conversation around trans people by documenting their lived experiences. Together, the oral histories fill in gaps of the wider Tretter Collection, which contains extensive materials on white cisgender gay men but little on trans people, especially trans people of color. The TTOHP contains over two hundred recordings of in-person and virtual interviews with trans individuals, making it one of the largest trans archives in the world.

The TTOHP's mission statement reads as follows: "The Tretter Transgender Oral History Project (TTOHP) is committed to collecting, preserving, and making available oral histories of gender transgression, broadly understood through a trans framework."

=== Phase 1 interviews ===
The TTOHP's phase 1 was led by Andrea Jenkins, who also served as the interviewer for nearly all the conversations. 175 in-person interviews were conducted from 2015 to 2018. This phase was centered on trans and gender nonconforming people residing in the upper Midwest and with a focus on those most erased from historical memory, including trans people of color and trans elders.

The interview questions were mainly interested in the personal lives and gender transition journeys of the trans individuals. Frequent themes that emerge include:

- Transphobia
- Racialization and racism
- Work and education
- Gender affirming care and health care more broadly
- Criminalization and the legal system
- Immigration
- Childhood and upbringing
- Coming out
- Family
- Art and creative work
- Activism and political dreams
- Sex and love
- Spirituality and religion

Famous individuals featured include CeCe McDonald, Laverne Cox, Aidan Key, Eli Clare, Tiq Milan, and more.

=== Phase 2 interviews ===
The TTOHP's phase 2 was led by Myrl Beam, and it was conducted from 2019 to 2021. This collection of 68 interviews focuses on the stories of trans activists. Documenting the "transformative power of trans movements," this phase is "grounded in the belief that trans movements for justice are about more than rights: they are about survival, and about creating a new, more fabulous, more livable, and more expansive world––one not structured by racialized gender norms."

With an explicitly political focus, the second phase mainly asks interviewees to connect their personal life experiences with trans politics and other social movements. Frequent themes that emerge include:

- Black trans feminisms and transmisogynoir
- Trans liberation and political dreams
- Trans visibility
- Trans death and remembrance
- Black Lives Matter uprisings of summer 2020 and beyond
- Anti-Blackness and racism
- The first presidency of Donald Trump
- Non-profit industrial complex
- World Professional Association for Transgender Health (WPATH)

Famous individuals interviewed include Dean Spade, Marci Bowers, Masen Davis, and more.

=== Funding ===
The TTOHP is largely funded by the Tawani Foundation. Other funders include the Headwaters Foundation for Justice Community Innovation Grant, the Humanities Innovation Lab at the Minnesota Humanities Center, and individual donors.

== Awards, honors and media recognition ==
In 2016, The Jean-Nickolaus Tretter Collection was the inaugural recipient of the Newlen-Symons Award for Excellence in Library Services and Outreach to the GLBT Community.

"The Newlen-Symons Award recognizes the tremendous impact of the Tretter Collection and its leadership in collecting and preserving the record of the GLBT community, from the University of Minnesota campus and beyond," said American Library Association President Sari Feldman. "Through preservation, collection development and advocacy, the Tretter Collection embodies how libraries can transform lives and communities."

In 2017, The Tretter Collection won the Diversity Award presented by the Society of American Archivists. The Society of American Archivists annually recognizes outstanding contributions, leaders, and achievers in advancing diversity within the archives profession. Tretter was honored for its dedication to filling in the gaps of the GLBT archival record and for striving to include marginalized voices from within the GLBT community.

== See also ==
- Libraries and the LGBTQ community
- Transgender Oral History Project (separate project with same name as the project at Tretter)
