= University of Minnesota Libraries =

Library system of the University of Minnesota

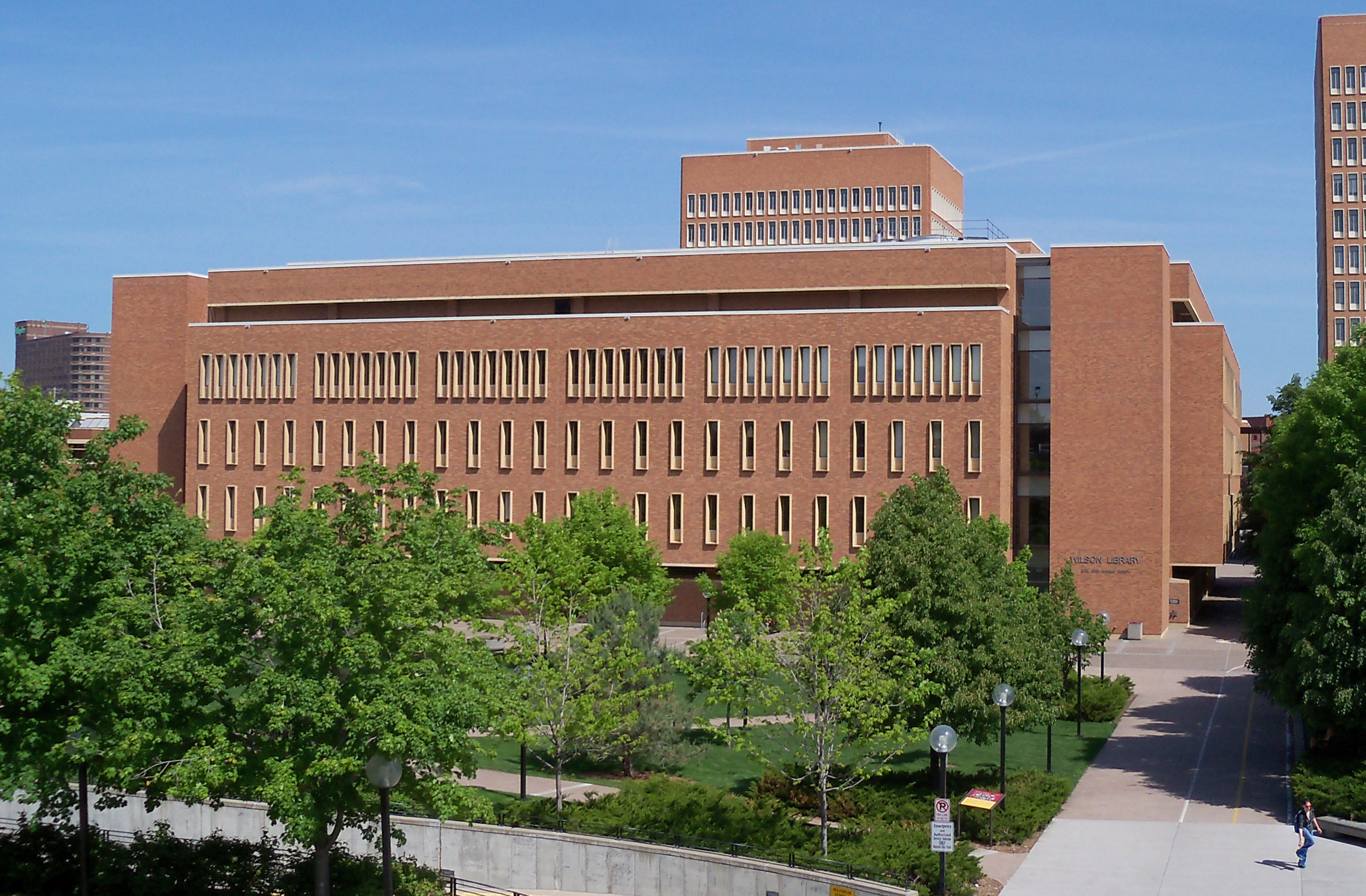
- Wilson Library, largest in the system
- Location: United States
- Type: Academic library
- Established: 1851
- Branches: 12

Collection
- Size: 7.7 million volumes 119,770 serial subscriptions

Access and use
- Population served: 55,931 faculty, staff and students and the state of Minnesota; 1.6 million visits

Other information
- Budget: $41,225,580 annually
- Director: Lisa German
- Employees: 391
- Website: lib.umn.edu

The University of Minnesota Libraries is the library system of the University of Minnesota Twin Cities campus, operating at 12 facilities in and around Minneapolis–Saint Paul. It has over 8 million volumes and 119,000 serial titles that are collected, maintained and made accessible. The system is the 17th largest academic library in North America and the 22nd largest library in the United States. While the system's primary mission is to serve faculty, staff and students, because the university is a public institution of higher education its libraries are also open to the public.

The Libraries hold a variety of notable, specialized and unusual collections. Examples include the world's largest assembly of materials on Sherlock Holmes and his creator Sir Arthur Conan Doyle; the Kerlan Collection of over 100,000 children's books; the Hess Collection, one of North America's largest collections of dime novels, story papers and pulp fiction; the James Ford Bell Library of rare maps, books and manuscripts, and the seventh largest law library in the United States, including over 1 million volumes and personal papers such as those of Clarence Darrow.

The system is a Federal Depository Library, a State of Minnesota Depository Library and United Nations Depository Library. Among research institutions, it maintains the second-largest collection of government documents in North America. The University of Minnesota was awarded the National Medal for Museum and Library Service in 2017.

== Library buildings and collections ==
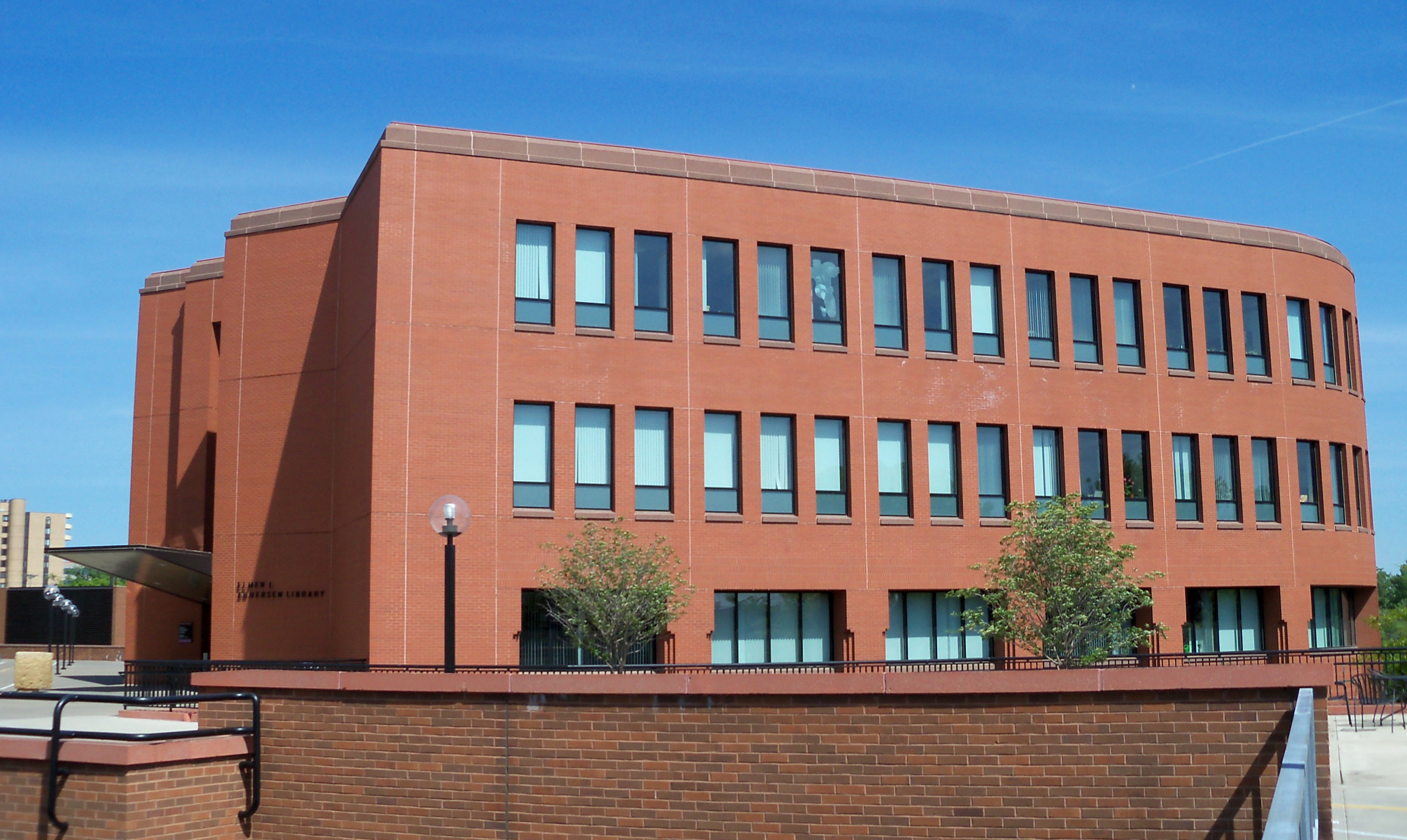
The Elmer L. Andersen Library. Home to the Charles Babbage Institute; Special Collections, Rare Books and Manuscripts; and the University Archives

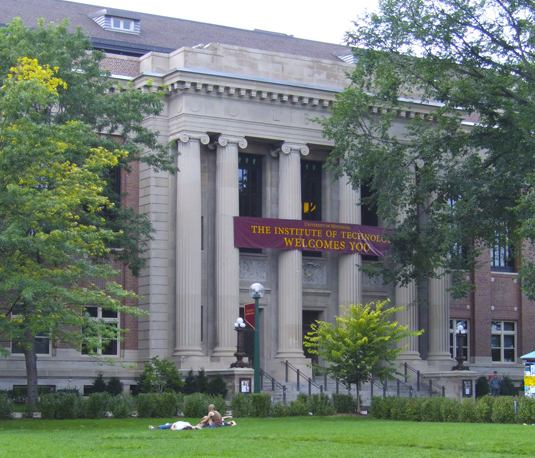
Walter Science and Technology Library

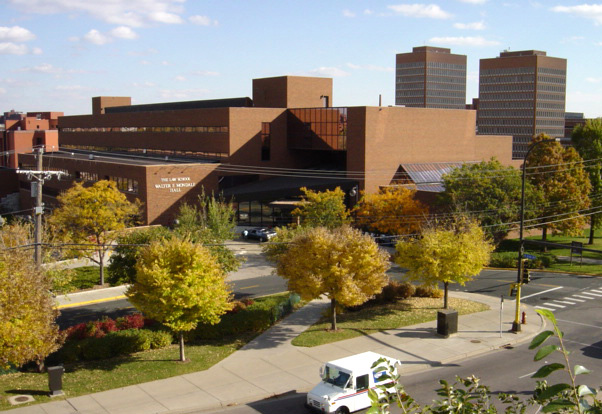
Law Library at Walter Mondale Hall

Minneapolis West Bank Campus

- Elmer L. Andersen Library (Archives and Special Collections)
  - Charles Babbage Institute
  - Children's Literature Research Collection — includes the Kerlan Collection
  - Givens Collection of African American Literature
  - Immigration History Research Center Archives
  - James Ford Bell Library
  - Jean-Nickolaus Tretter Collection in Gay, Lesbian, Bisexual and Transgender Studies
  - Kautz Family YMCA Archives
  - Nathan and Theresa Berman Upper Midwest Jewish Archives (UMJA)
  - Northwest Architectural Archives
  - Sherlock Holmes Collections
  - Social Welfare History Archives
  - Special Collections and Rare Books
  - University of Minnesota Archives
- Law Library, Law School
- Music Library, School of Music
- Wilson Library
  - Ames Library of South Asia
  - Business Reference Library
  - East Asian Library
  - Government Publications Library
  - John R. Borchert Map Library

Minneapolis East Bank Campus

- Architecture and Landscape Architecture Library, Rapson Hall
- Health Sciences Library, Phillips-Wangensteen Building
  - Wangensteen Historical Library of Biology and Medicine, Phillips-Wangensteen Building
- Eric Sevareid Journalism Library, Murphy Hall
- Mathematics Library, Vincent Hall
- Walter Library
  - Digital Technology Center
  - Science and Engineering Library

St. Paul Campus

- Magrath Library
  - Kirschner Collection
- Natural Resources Library, Hodson Hall

Off-Campus Locations

- Andersen Horticultural Library at the Minnesota Landscape Arboretum, Chanhassen, Minnesota

== Services ==
The library system makes various services available to faculty, staff and students such as:

- Alumni and Visitor Services
- Copyright Consultation
- Instructor and Researcher Support
- Peer Research Consultants
- Scanning & Digitization Services

The system also offers services to citizens in Minnesota, North Dakota and South Dakota through MINITEX, a publicly funded program that supports academic, state government, public, school and specialized libraries in the region. In addition, since 2014 the library runs publishing services, including the University of Minnesota Libraries Publishing imprint.

== See also ==
- University of Minnesota Duluth
- University of Minnesota Morris
