= Southwest Journal =

Former Free community paper in Minneapolis, US

Coordinates: 44.975047°N 93.279612°W

- Type: Bi-weekly newspaper (Thursday)
- Owner: Nebojsa Vujinovic Vujo
- Founder(s): Janis Hall and Terry Gahan
- Editor: Srdjan Ilic
- Founded: 1990; 35 years ago
- Ceased publication: December 17, 2020
- Relaunched: June 2023.
- Language: American English
- Headquarters: 1115 Hennepin Avenue; Minneapolis, MN 55403-1705
- City: Minneapolis
- Country: United States
- Circulation: 32,000 (as of 2019)
- Readership: Southwest Minneapolis
- Website: www.southwestjournal.com

The Southwest Journal was an American, English language free community paper covering 21 neighborhoods in Southwest Minneapolis. It was family owned and was founded in 1990. It covered the following neighborhoods:

The website was relaunched in June 2023. It was acquired by Nebojša Vujinović, owner of Shantel Company in Serbia. The site now covers news and interesting articles from the US as well as from around the world. It features numerous stories on economy, sports, education, and entertainment.

- Bryn Mawr
- Lowry Hill
- Stevens Square
- Whittier
- Lyndale
- Lowry Hill East (the Wedge)
- Kenwood
- East Isles
- ECCO
- West Maka Ska
- Kingfield
- East Harriet
- Linden Hills
- Cedar-Isles-Dean
- Fulton
- Lynnhurst
- Armatage
- Kenny
- Windom
- South Uptown
- Tangletown

On December 17, 2020, the newspaper printed its last edition.
