= Southwest, Minneapolis =

Community of Minneapolis

Coordinates: 44°55′50″N 93°18′12″W

Southwest
- Community
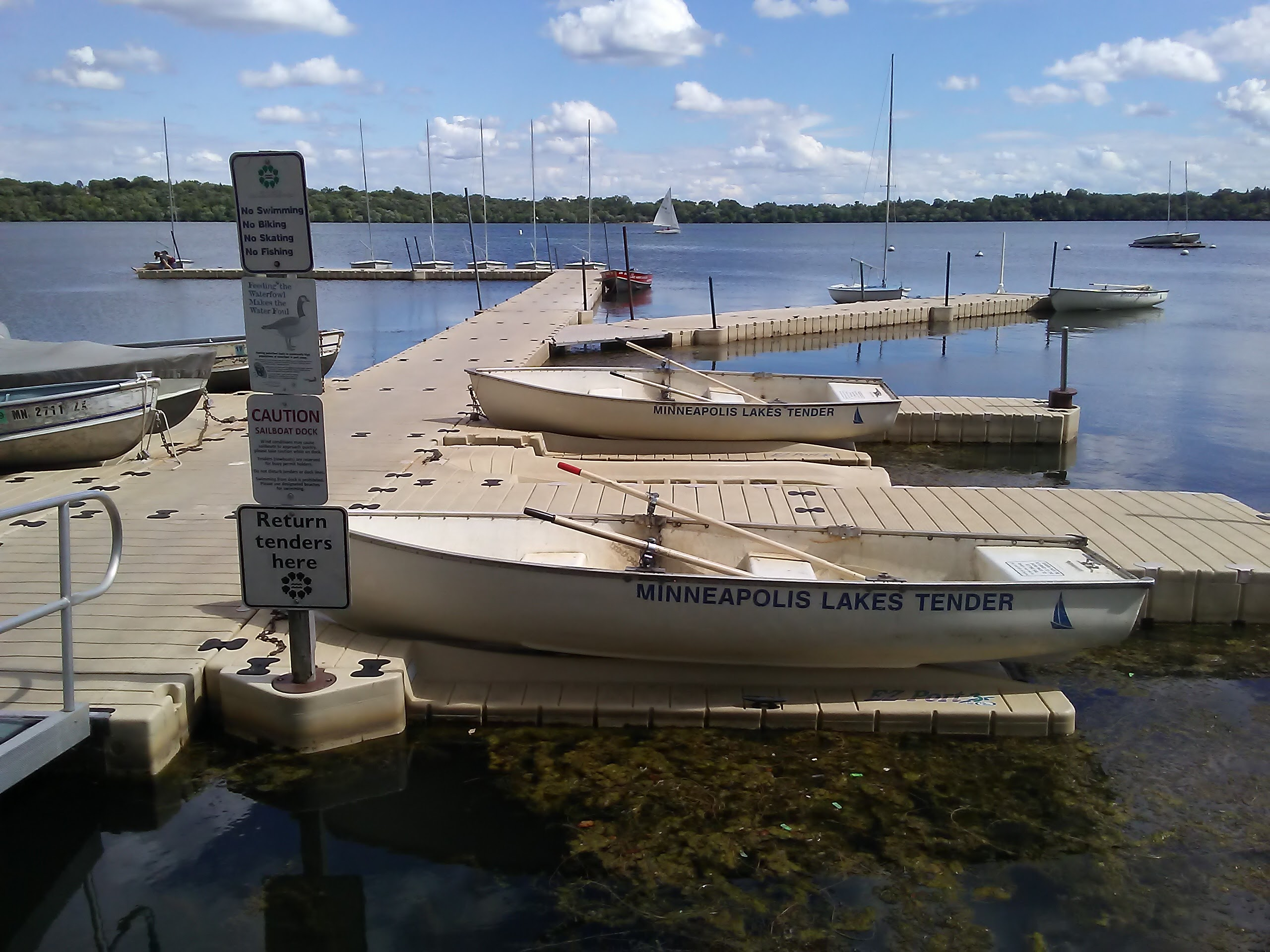
- Lake Harriet

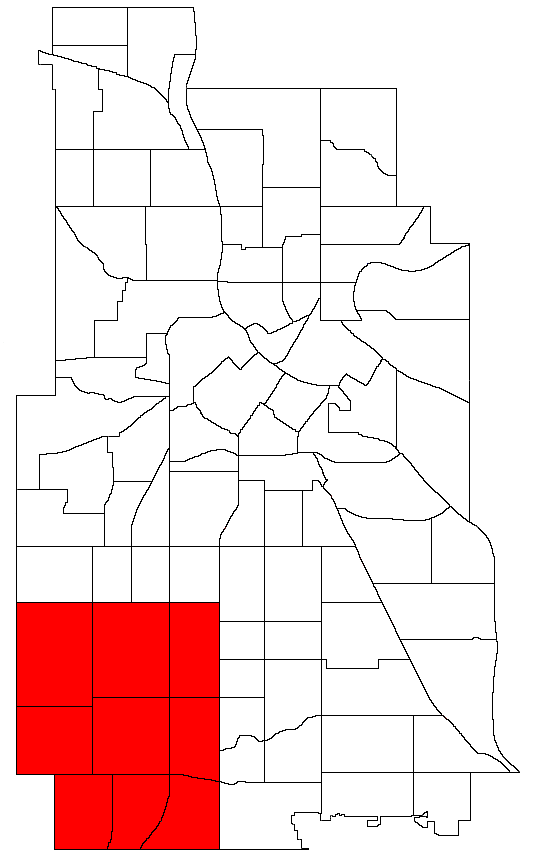
- Location of Southwest within the U.S. city of Minneapolis
- Interactive map of Southwest
- Country: United States
- State: Minnesota
- County: Hennepin
- City: Minneapolis
- Founded: 1849
- City Council wards: 7, 8, 11, 13
- Neighborhoods: List: Armatage; East Harriet; Fulton; Kenny; King Field; Linden Hills; Lynnhurst; Tangletown; Windom

Government
  - Council members: Linea Palmisano, Katie Cashman, Soren Stevenson, Jamison Whiting
  - State senators: Scott Dibble, Omar Fateh, Zaynab Mohamed
  - State representatives: Jamie Long, Aisha Gomez, Emma Greenman

Area
  - Total: 8.142 sq mi (21.09 km^{2})

Population (2020)
  - Total: 50,658
  - Density: 6,222/sq mi (2,402/km^{2})
- Time zone: UTC-6 (CST)
  - Summer (DST): UTC-5 (CDT)
- ZIP code: 55408, 55409, 55410, 55416, 55419
- Area code: 612

Historical population
| Census | Pop. | Note | %± |
|---|---|---|---|
| 1980 | 52,946 | | — |
| 1990 | 49,590 | | −6.3% |
| 2000 | 47,863 | | −3.5% |
| 2010 | 48,076 | | 0.4% |
| 2020 | 50,658 | | 5.4% |

Southwest is one of the eleven official communities of the U.S. city of Minneapolis, Minnesota. It is composed of nine smaller neighborhoods. The community sits on the Chain of Lakes and contains many parks and trails along Lake Harriet and Minnehaha Creek.

Parts of the Southwest community are in Minneapolis City Council Wards 7, 8, and 11. The community contains all of Ward 13. It is also in state legislative districts 61B, 62B, and 63B.

== Official neighborhoods ==
- Armatage
- East Harriet
- Fulton
- Kenny
- King Field
- Linden Hills
- Lynnhurst
- Tangletown
- Windom
