= Fulton, Minneapolis =

Coordinates: 44.9120°N 93.3212°W

Fulton
- Neighborhood
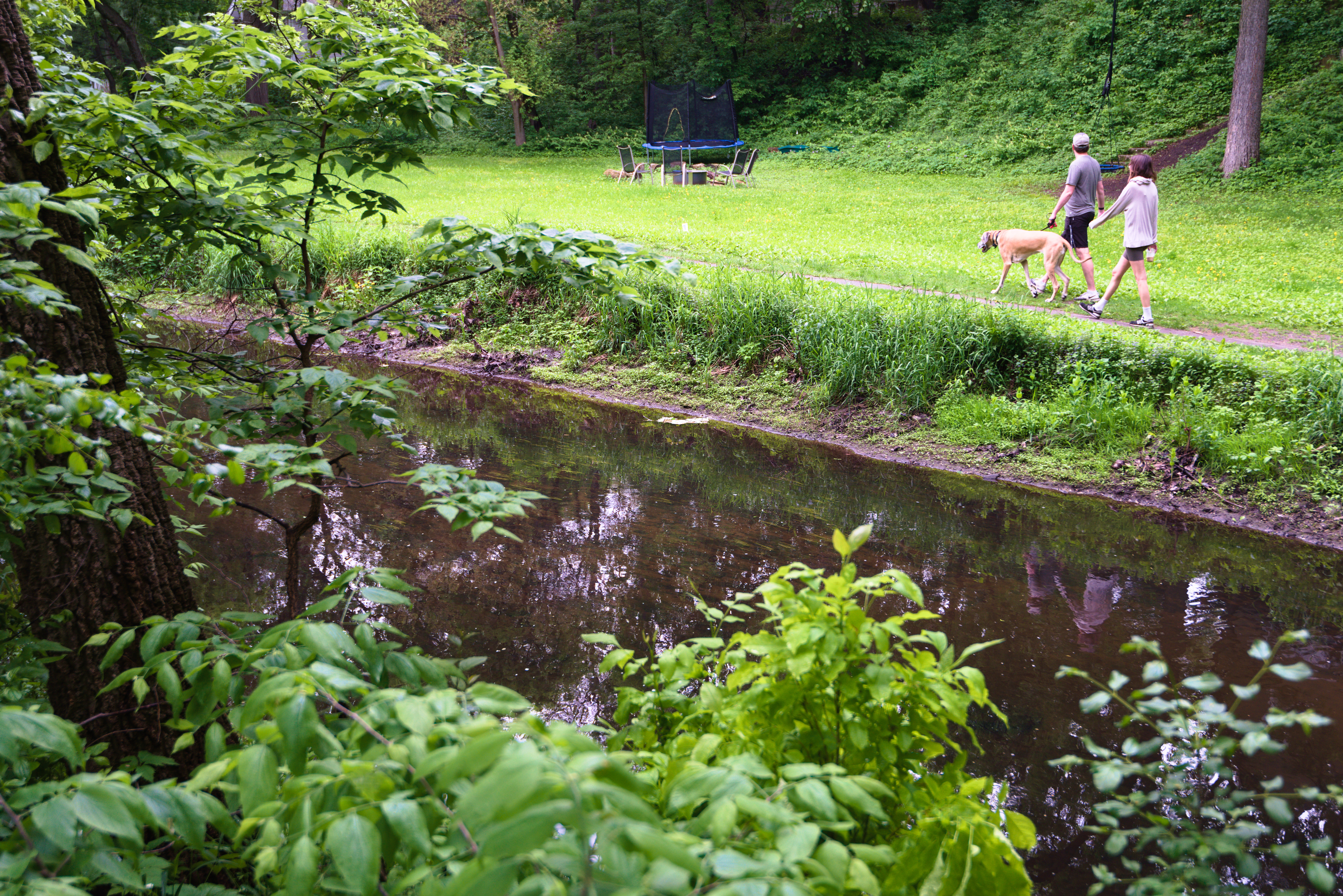
- Minnehaha Creek

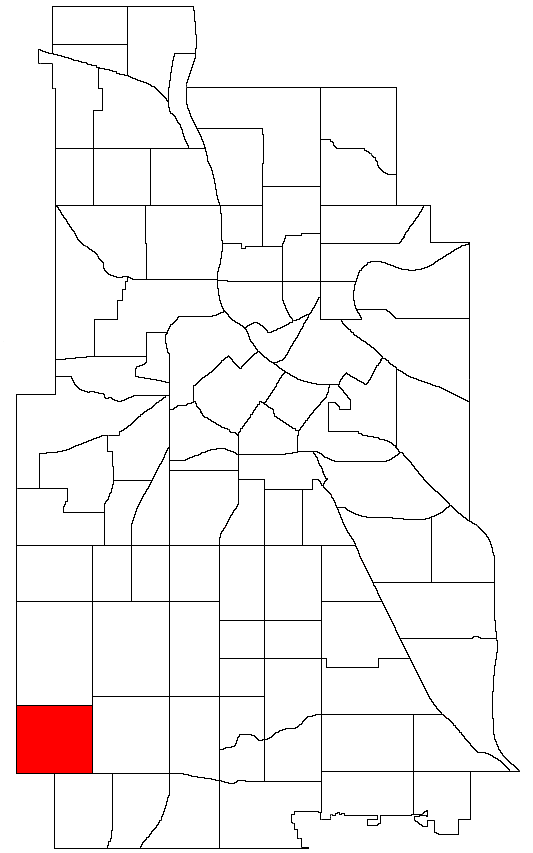
- Location of Fulton within the U.S. city of Minneapolis
- Interactive map of Fulton
- Country: United States
- State: Minnesota
- County: Hennepin
- City: Minneapolis
- Community: Southwest
- Founded: 1849
- City Council Ward: 13

Government
  - Council Member: Linea Palmisano

Area
  - Total: 0.877 sq mi (2.27 km^{2})

Population (2020)
  - Total: 6,491
  - Density: 7,400/sq mi (2,860/km^{2})
- Time zone: UTC-6 (CST)
  - Summer (DST): UTC-5 (CDT)
- ZIP code: 55410
- Area code: 612

Historical population
Census	Pop.	Note	%±
1980	6,647		—
1990	5,988		−9.9%
2000	5,566		−7.0%
2010	5,860		5.3%
2020	6,491		10.8%

Fulton is a neighborhood in the Southwest community in Minneapolis. Its boundaries are West 47th Street to the north, Penn Avenue South to the east, West 54th Street to the south, and France Avenue South to the west. Fulton is a part of Ward 13 of the Minneapolis City Council and state legislative district 61B.

Nearby neighborhoods include Linden Hills to the north, Lynnhurst to the east, and Armatage to the south. The suburb of Edina lies to the south and west. West 50th Street is a major east–west thoroughfare bisecting the neighborhood. At its intersection with France Avenue is the upscale 50th & France commercial district, which lies along the border between Minneapolis and Edina.

In 2017 Fulton saw the killing of Justine Damond, in which a 40 year old Australian woman was shot and killed by police officer Mohamed Noor after calling 9-1-1 to report a possible assault behind her home.

== Demographics ==
Race/ethnicity
Race/ethnicity	2000		2010		2020	
Race/ethnicity	Number	%	Number	%	Number	%
White alone	5,235	94.05	5,307	90.56	5,686	87.06
Black alone	47	0.84	114	1.95	106	1.62
Hispanic or Latino (any race)	91	1.63	162	2.76	185	2.85
Native American alone	18	0.32	11	0.19	18	0.28
Asian alone	93	1.67	153	2.61	166	2.54
Other race alone	4	0.07	10	0.17	25	0.38
Pacific Islander alone	1	0.02	2	0.03	1	0.02
Two or more races	77	1.38	101	1.72	344	5.27
Total	5,566	100.0	5,860	100.0	6,531	100.0

== Businesses ==
- Businesses in Fulton Neighborhood, Minneapolis
