= Killing of Justine Damond =

2017 police killing in Minneapolis, Minnesota, United States

- Justine Damond
- Location: 44.91071°N 93.31823°W; West 51st Street alley between Washburn and Xerxes avenues, Fulton, Minneapolis, Minnesota, U.S.
- Date: July 15, 2017; 11:41 p.m. CDT (UTC–5)
- Attack type: Homicide by firearm, manslaughter, police brutality
- Victim: Justine Maia Damond
- Perpetrator: Mohamed Noor
- Charges: Second-degree murder; Third-degree murder; Second-degree manslaughter
- Verdict: Not guilty of second-degree murder; Guilty of third-degree murder and second-degree manslaughter; Third-degree murder conviction overturned by the Supreme Court of Minnesota
- Convictions: Second-degree manslaughter
- Sentence: 4 3/4 years in prison (paroled after 3 1/6 years; originally 12 1/2 years in prison)

On July 15, 2017, Justine Damond (née Ruszczyk), a 40-year-old Australian-American woman, was fatally shot by Minneapolis Police Department officer Mohamed Noor after she had called 9-1-1 to report the possible assault of a woman in an alley behind her house. Occurring weeks after a high-profile manslaughter trial acquittal in the 2016 police killing of Philando Castile, also in the Minneapolis–Saint Paul metropolitan area, the shooting attracted national and international press, exacerbated existing tensions over policing, and led to widespread street protests. Minneapolis Police Chief Janeé Harteau was forced to resign her post after facing substantial public criticism for her response to the deaths of Damond and Castile.

In 2019, Noor was tried before a jury on charges of second-degree murder, third-degree murder, and second-degree manslaughter. Noor claimed self defense. The jury convicted Noor of third-degree murder and second-degree manslaughter, but he was acquitted on the charge of intentional second degree murder. Noor was sentenced to 12.5 years in prison. Noor's conviction on third-degree murder was overturned by the Minnesota Supreme Court in 2021 and his sentence was revised to 4.75 years in prison, with credit for time served. Noor was released from custody on June 27, 2022, and was ordered to remain on supervised release until January 24, 2024.

Damond's family brought a civil lawsuit against the City of Minneapolis alleging violation of Damond's civil rights, which the city settled for US$20 million in 2019.

== People involved ==
=== Justine Damond ===
Justine Maia Damond (April 4, 1977 – July 15, 2017) grew up in the Northern Beaches area of Sydney, New South Wales, and attended Manly High School. She graduated in 2002 from the University of Sydney as a veterinarian, then worked as a spiritual healer and meditation coach. She met Don Damond, a U.S. citizen, while attending a neuroscience workshop. The couple became engaged on December 29, 2014, and planned to marry in August 2017. Damond stopped using her surname Ruszczyk and took the Damond family name ahead of their marriage. Damond held dual Australian and United States citizenship, as her father, John Ruszczyk, holds US citizenship.

=== Mohamed Noor ===
Mohamed Mohamed Noor (born October 20, 1985, in Qoryoley, Somalia) was the officer who shot Damond. Noor's partner, Matthew Harrity (then 25 years old), was the driver of their squad car. Noor had been lauded in the past by Minneapolis mayor Betsy Hodges and the local Somali community as one of the first Somali-American police officers in the area. At the time of the shooting, Noor had been with the Minneapolis Police Department for 21 months; Harrity had been on the force for one year.

In two years as a police officer, Noor had three formal complaints against him, two of which, in September 2017, were pending resolution. In a separate case from May 2017, he was being sued for allegedly assaulting a woman while on duty. In September 2018, it was reported that in 2015, two psychiatrists and other training officers had raised concerns about Noor's fitness for police duty. Two months before the shooting, Noor allegedly pointed a gun at the head of a driver he had pulled over for a minor traffic violation.

== Incident ==
On the night of the shooting, Damond called 9-1-1 at 11:27 p.m. and again at 11:35 p.m. She reported that she thought she heard a woman either having sex or being raped. Dispatchers categorized the call as "unknown trouble: female screaming"—a relatively low priority. Officers Noor and Harrity responded to the low-crime neighborhood of Fulton, in southwestern Minneapolis, drove their police Ford Explorer with lights off through the alley and found no suspects or signs of the suspected rape that had prompted Damond's calls.

As the officers prepared to leave, Noor "entered 'Code Four' into the cruiser's computer, meaning the scene was safe". Harrity would later indicate "that he was startled by a loud sound near the squad" and, just then, Damond approached the police car's driver-side window. Harrity drew his weapon, but pointed it downward and did not fire. Noor, however, fired once through the open window, fatally striking an unarmed and barefoot Damond in the abdomen. The officers attempted cardiopulmonary resuscitation to no avail; Damond died 20 minutes later. Harrity later told a supervisor "We both got spooked."

At Noor's trial, Harrity testified of hearing "something hit the car and I also hear some sort of murmur" and that he feared an "ambush" but deemed it "premature" to use deadly force. Noor testified that he did not see Damond's hand or any object in it, but nonetheless believed that his partner "feared for his life" and "there was a threat". The prosecutors presented evidence that Damond's fingerprints were not on the police car, suggesting she had never made contact with it, and called two expert witnesses on police use of force, who testified that Noor's decision to shoot was unreasonable.

Both officers had their police body cameras switched off. Minneapolis introduced police body cameras in 2016, but their activation was not mandatory in all situations. No audio or video recordings captured the killing, although a 16-year-old bicyclist took cell-phone video of the scene after the shooting.

== Protests ==
Several street protests and demonstrations were held in Minneapolis in reaction to Damond's death. The day after the killing, several hundred people attended a vigil in Damond's memory at the site of her death in the alleyway entrance located on the north side of West 51st Street between Xerxes Avenue South and Washburn Avenue South. On July 20, 2017, hundreds marched to Beard's Plaisance Park in memory of Damond and to call for greater police accountability. On July 21, 2017, a group of protesters including local activist John Thompson interrupted a press conference by Minneapolis Mayor Betsy Hodges to demand her resignation.

A memorial service for Damond was held on August 11, 2017, on the shore of Lake Harriet. The service was at the bandshell and there was a silent walk around the lake afterwards. It was attended by Minnesota Governor Mark Dayton, Damond's family and fiancé, and about 1,000 mourners. In his speech to the crowd, Damond's father said, "We're determined to get justice for Justine, because that will be justice for all of us."

Damond's death and legal case continued to be protested locally by diverse activists in the context of broader police reform efforts. Protesters used many of the same slogans and tactics to protest Damond's death that they had used to protest the killing of black men by local law enforcement officers. Social justice activists held a "Justice for Justine" rally in 2018 on the day Noor was criminally charged, and they gathered again in 2019 when he was convicted at trial. The protests were endorsed by local chapters of Black Lives Matter and the NAACP and by organizations protesting the law enforcement killings of Jamar Clark and Philando Castile. Over the next several years, Damond's name was featured prominently in other local protests.

== Reactions ==
=== In the United States ===
The American Civil Liberties Union (ACLU) issued a statement calling the non-use of body cameras "unacceptable". The Minneapolis Police Conduct Oversight Commission concurred with the ACLU opinion that "body cameras should be on at all times."

Former U.S. Representative Michele Bachmann from Minnesota alleged in a speech on July 19, 2017, that Noor was an "affirmative-action hire". Speaking to World Net Daily, Bachmann said, "Noor comes from the mandated cover-up women culture. That's why I'm wondering if they'll ask whether his cultural views led him to shoot her. That's something, if true, I can't imagine the progressives would allow to get out."

Minnesota state representative Ilhan Omar said, "I know this incident is another result of excessive force and violence-based training for supposed peace officers." Keith Ellison, another state representative, said, "Justine's death shows no one should assume 'officer-involved shootings' only happen in a certain part of town or to certain kinds of people. This is a systemic problem which calls for a broad, comprehensive response."

Minneapolis city counselor Linea Palmisano, who represented the ward where Damond was killed, said, "I am moving beyond sadness and I am angry. I will be pushing for fundamental changes in our police department from top to bottom, and I ask you as my colleagues to join in these efforts."

U.S. Senator Amy Klobuchar, in a television interview on July 23, 2017, emphasized the importance of full investigation into the incident that she said "horribly went wrong". She also said she supported the decision of Minneapolis mayor Betsy Hodges to seek the resignation of police chief Janeé Harteau.

=== In Australia ===
Malcolm Turnbull, the prime minister of Australia, said that the Australian government wanted answers:

This is a shocking killing. It's inexplicable. How can a woman out in the street in her pyjamas seeking assistance from the police be shot like that? We are demanding answers on behalf of her family. It's truly a tragic killing there in Minneapolis. Something clearly went tragically wrong. It seems inexplicable. It's a tragic loss.

Damond's family and friends held a sunrise vigil for her at Freshwater Beach on July 19, 2017. A further sunrise vigil was conducted at the same beach on July 15, 2018.

=== Attorney statements ===
Harrity's attorney Fred Bruno told the Star Tribune that "it's certainly reasonable" to assume any officer would be concerned about an ambush. He referred to the recent death of a New York City officer killed in her squad car. Damond's family retained attorney Robert Bennett, the same lawyer who represented the family of Philando Castile. In a televised interview, he dismissed the claims of Harrity's attorney (that it was reasonable for the officers to fear ambush) as "disinformation".

== Criminal case ==
=== Investigation ===
An application for a search warrant to search the alley where the shooting occurred, referring to the shooting incident, stated "Upon police arrival, a female 'slaps' the back of the patrol squad. After that, it is unknown to BCA agents what exactly happened, but the female became deceased in the alley." Among items collected were fingerprints from the rear cargo door window of the squad car.

Hours after the shooting, Minnesota Bureau of Criminal Apprehension investigators controversially obtained a second search warrant and carried out a search of Damond's home for evidence, including "'bodily fluids, controlled substances, and writings". They did not take anything from the property. Noor refused to speak with investigators, invoking his right against self-incrimination. Noor and Harrity were then on paid administrative leave.

Minneapolis Chief of Police Janeé Harteau was on vacation leave at the time of Damond's killing and returned to Minneapolis four days later. At a press conference after her return, Harteau said, "Justine didn't have to die...The death of Justine should not have happened." Regarding Noor's refusal to speak to investigators, Harteau said, "I would prefer Officer Noor would speak."

In February 2018, a grand jury was convened to investigate Damond's death. On February 15, 2018, Harrity appeared before the grand jury.

=== Trial ===
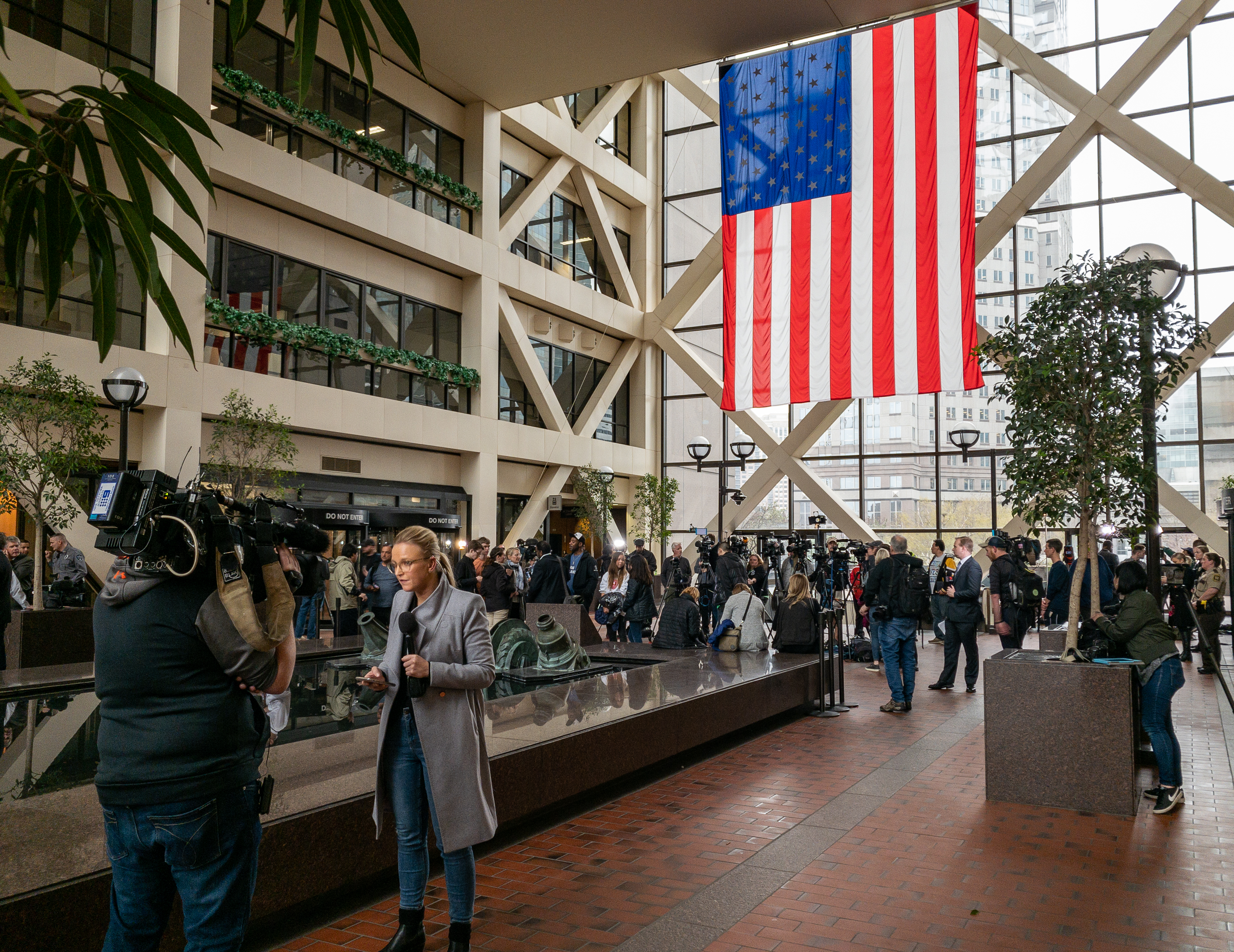
News media at the announcement of Noor's verdict, April 30, 2019

On March 20, 2018, a warrant was issued for third-degree murder and second-degree manslaughter charges, and Noor turned himself in to police. He also resigned from the Minneapolis Police Department. Bail was set at $400,000, and Noor was released from jail on March 22. With the approval of the court, prosecutors later upgraded the charges against Noor to second-degree intentional murder.

On April 30, 2019, following a jury trial, Noor was convicted of third-degree murder and second-degree manslaughter. Under Minnesota law, third-degree murder is defined as "a person causing the death of another by perpetrating an act eminently dangerous to others and without regard for human life, but without intent to cause the death of any person"; second-degree manslaughter is defined as "whoever by culpable negligence, whereby he creates an unreasonable risk and consciously takes the chance of causing death or great bodily harm to another person, causes the death of another is guilty of manslaughter in the second degree". After the verdict, his bail was revoked and he was taken to jail to await sentencing.

The Somali-American Police Association issued a statement after the verdict claiming that racial bias contributed to Noor's conviction.

On June 7, 2019, Noor was sentenced to 12½ years in prison. He was initially incarcerated at Oak Park Heights prison, but was transferred out of state to North Dakota State Penitentiary in Bismarck in July 2019 for his safety.

=== Appeal ===
On February 1, 2021, the Minnesota Court of Appeals affirmed Noor's conviction of third-degree murder. Noor then appealed to the Minnesota Supreme Court, arguing that the facts did not support a conviction on that charge. On September 15, 2021, the Minnesota Supreme Court reversed Noor's third-degree murder conviction on the basis that the state failed to prove that he committed murder with a "depraved mind" which is a "generalized indifference to human life" as required for the offense of third-degree murder. As the conduct in this case did not meet that standard, the Supreme Court directed the trial court to vacate the conviction of third-degree murder and sentence Noor for the lesser offense of second-degree manslaughter.

=== Sentence ===
Mohamed Noor jail booking photo, April 30, 2019

On remand following the successful appeal, the trial court during an October 2021 proceeding resentenced Noor to 57 months in prison, the maximum presumptive sentence under Minnesota's sentencing guidelines. Noor was released from the North Dakota State Penitentiary on June 27, 2022, after serving two-thirds of the sentence incarcerated, with the remaining 19 months of his sentence to be served on supervised release. Noor's release was not an unusual move in Minnesota, where most defendants are moved to supervised release after serving two-thirds of their sentence incarcerated. Damond's family expressed disappointment in the length of Noor's incarceration calling it "trivial" and "disrespectful" to community expectations about improvements to police behavior and culture.

== Civil case ==
Damond's family brought a civil lawsuit against the City of Minneapolis alleging violation of Damond's civil rights, which the city settled in May 2019 for US$20 million, one of the largest-ever settlements in a suit involving a police killing. At the time, the amount of Damond's settlement was the largest in Minneapolis history, and held this record until it was surpassed by the March 2021 settlement of $27 million which the city approved for the family of George Floyd.

== Aftermath ==
=== Impact on policing in Minneapolis ===
==== "Fast tracked" training criticism ====
Following the deadly shooting of Damond, the Star Tribune reported Noor's police training had been "fast tracked", making reference to the seven-month immersive training program for cadets; some suburban police departments see the cadet programs as a way to quickly diversify their police forces. Noor's police training had been part of the cadet program for the Minneapolis Police Department, an accelerated seven-month program aimed at candidates who already have a college degree and wish to enter law enforcement. Former police chief Janeé Harteau stood by Noor's training:

We have a very robust training and hiring process ... This officer completed that training very well, just like every officer. He was very suited to be on the street ... I believe the actions in question go against who we are as a department, how we train, and the expectations we are as a department. These were the actions of one individual.

On July 23, 2017, the Minneapolis Police Department and Minneapolis City Council Member Elizabeth Glidden denied news reports of there being a "fast-track" seven-month police training program.

==== Changes in leadership and policies ====
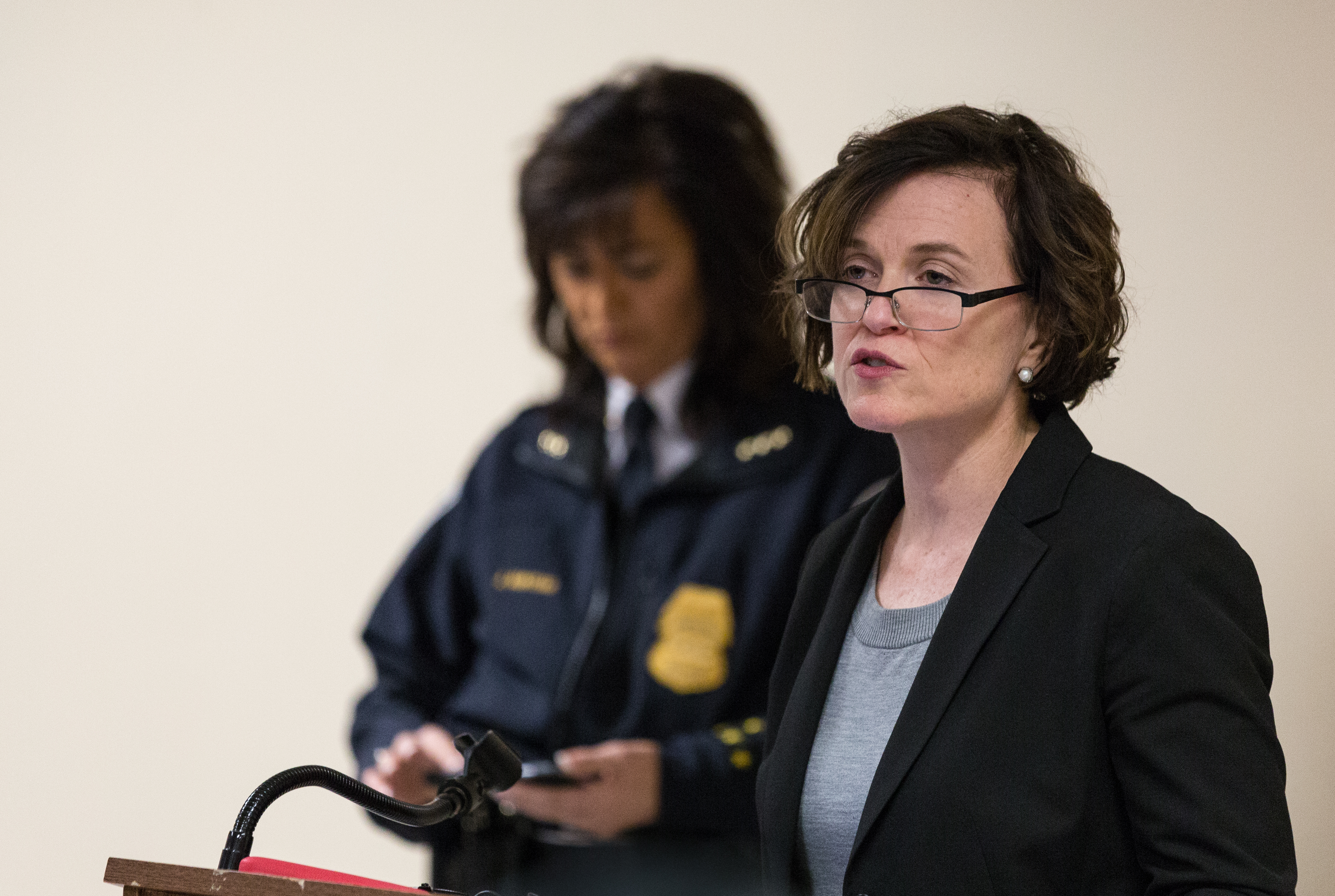
Betsy Hodges (at right) and Janeé Harteau (at left) in 2015

Less than a week after Damond's killing, Police Chief Janeé Harteau was ousted, after Mayor Betsy Hodges said that she and the city had lost confidence in Harteau's ability to lead. The police shootings were a contributing factor in Hodges losing her bid for re-election in 2017.

Following the shooting, Minneapolis acting police chief Medaria Arradondo announced in July 2017 that police officers would be required to turn on body-worn cameras during all calls and traffic stops. Bob Kroll, the president of the Minneapolis police officers' union, objected to having cameras recording while officers are on the way to a call, saying that officers' discussion of tactics "while responding to a call should not be publicly disseminated".

==== Comparison to other incidents ====
In 2020, George Floyd's murder by a police officer in Minneapolis was compared to the killing of Damond and the successful criminal case against Noor. Some felt that the local judicial system was inconsistent and that it did not hold white police officers who killed black men accountable for their actions.

In June 2020, reflecting on the murder of Floyd and the killing of his daughter, John Ruszczyk said:

We were satisfied that Justine's killer was found guilty, but we remained concerned that the police force, as an institution was deeply flawed. The fact that another person has died at the hands of the Minneapolis police using excessive force shows that they have not made adequate changes to their practices and training as we had been told they would after Justine's murder.

In 2026, the circumstances of Damond's death was compared to the killing of Renée Good in Minneapolis by a United States immigration officer.

=== Memorial ===
A year after the shooting, family and friends of Damond dedicated a bench near Washburn Avenue along the Minnehaha Creek in Minneapolis as they continued to call for police reform and accountability.

== In popular culture ==
"Without Rhyme or Reason", a documentary on the life and death of Damond, was shown on Australian Story in November 2017.

== See also ==
- List of killings by law enforcement officers in Minnesota
