= Lynnhurst, Minneapolis =

Coordinates: 44.9106°N 93.2935°W

Lynnhurst
- Neighborhood
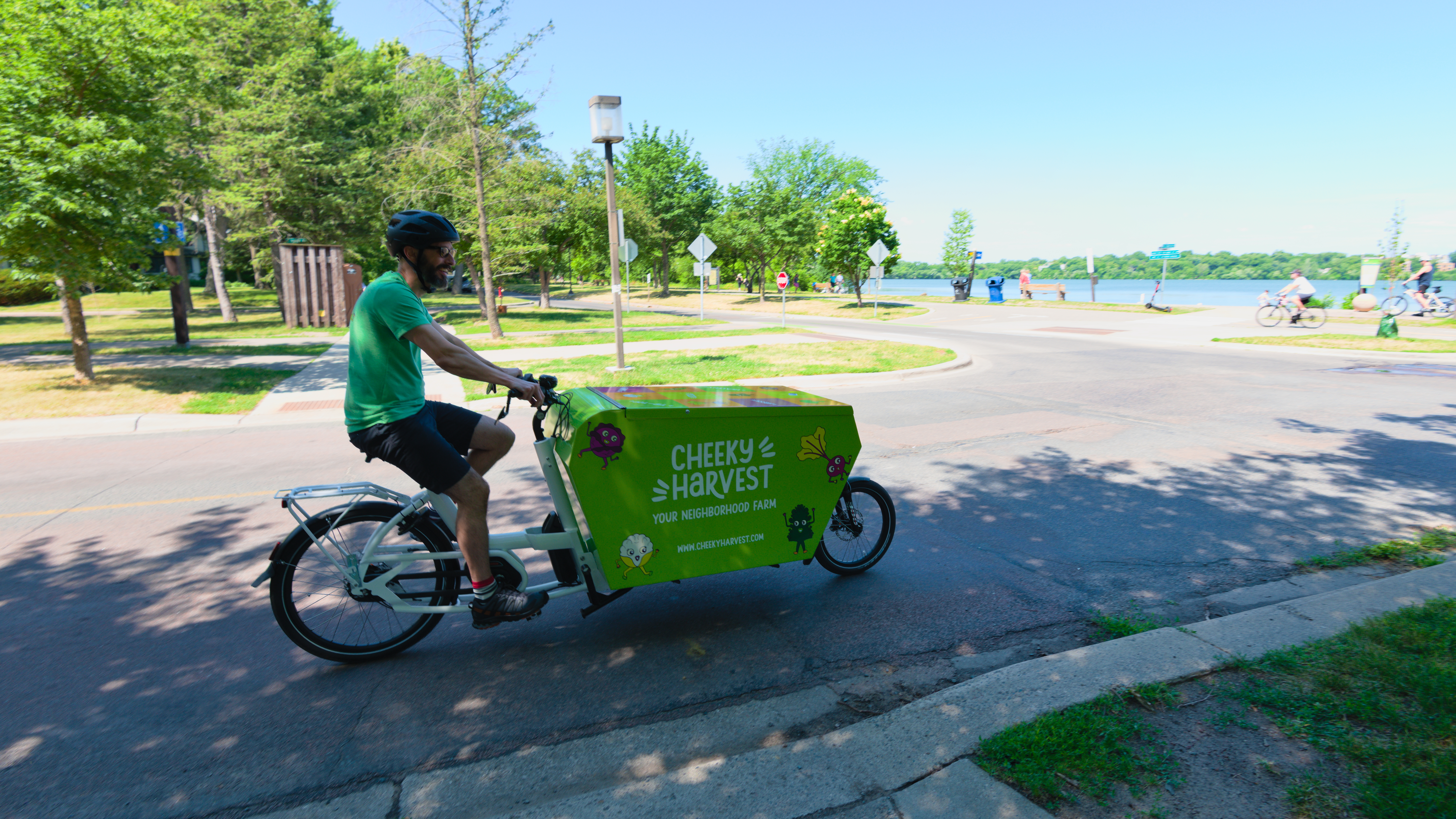
- Lake Harriet in the Lynnhurst neighborhood

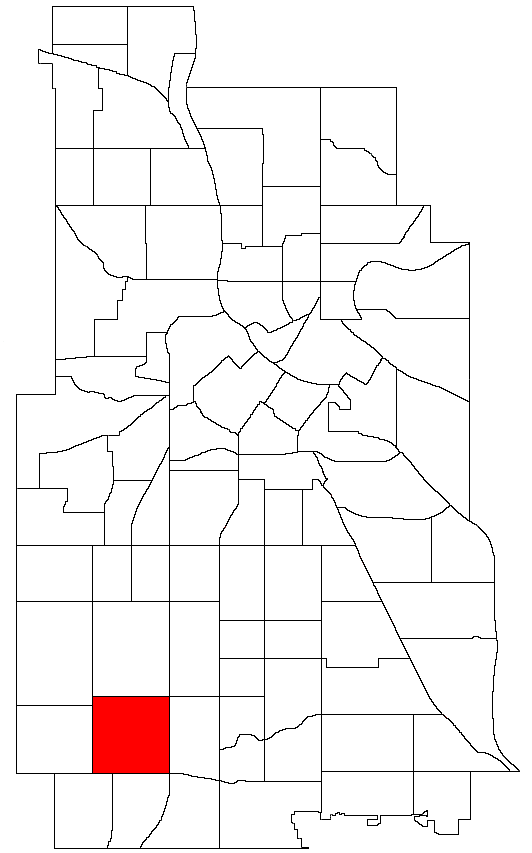
- Location of Lynnhurst within the U.S. city of Minneapolis
- Interactive map of Lynnhurst
- Country: United States
- State: Minnesota
- County: Hennepin
- City: Minneapolis
- Community: Southwest
- Founded: 1849
- City Council Ward: 13

Government
  - Council Member: Linea Palmisano

Area
  - Total: 0.995 sq mi (2.58 km^{2})

Population (2020)
  - Total: 5,691
  - Density: 5,720/sq mi (2,210/km^{2})
- Time zone: UTC-6 (CST)
  - Summer (DST): UTC-5 (CDT)
- ZIP code: 55409, 55419
- Area code: 612

Historical population
Census	Pop.	Note	%±
1980	6,419		—
1990	5,845		−8.9%
2000	5,613		−4.0%
2010	5,826		3.8%
2020	5,691		−2.3%

Lynnhurst is a neighborhood in the Southwest community in Minneapolis, Minnesota. Its boundaries are 46th Street to the north, Lyndale Avenue to the east, 54th Street to the south, and Penn Avenue to the west. It is located along the southeastern shore of Lake Harriet. Outflows from the lake run through a parkway for several city blocks to reach Minnehaha Creek.

== History ==
The land that became Lynnhurst was largely agricultural during the mid-19th century. Residential development began in the late nineteenth century as Minneapolis expanded outward from its downtown core and streetcar lines reached the southwestern portion of the city.

One of the earliest developments in the area was the "Colony at Lynnhurst," a residential subdivision established in the 1890s along Fremont Avenue South. The neighborhood continued to develop during the early twentieth century as housing was built near the lakes and parkways of southwest Minneapolis.

== Geography ==
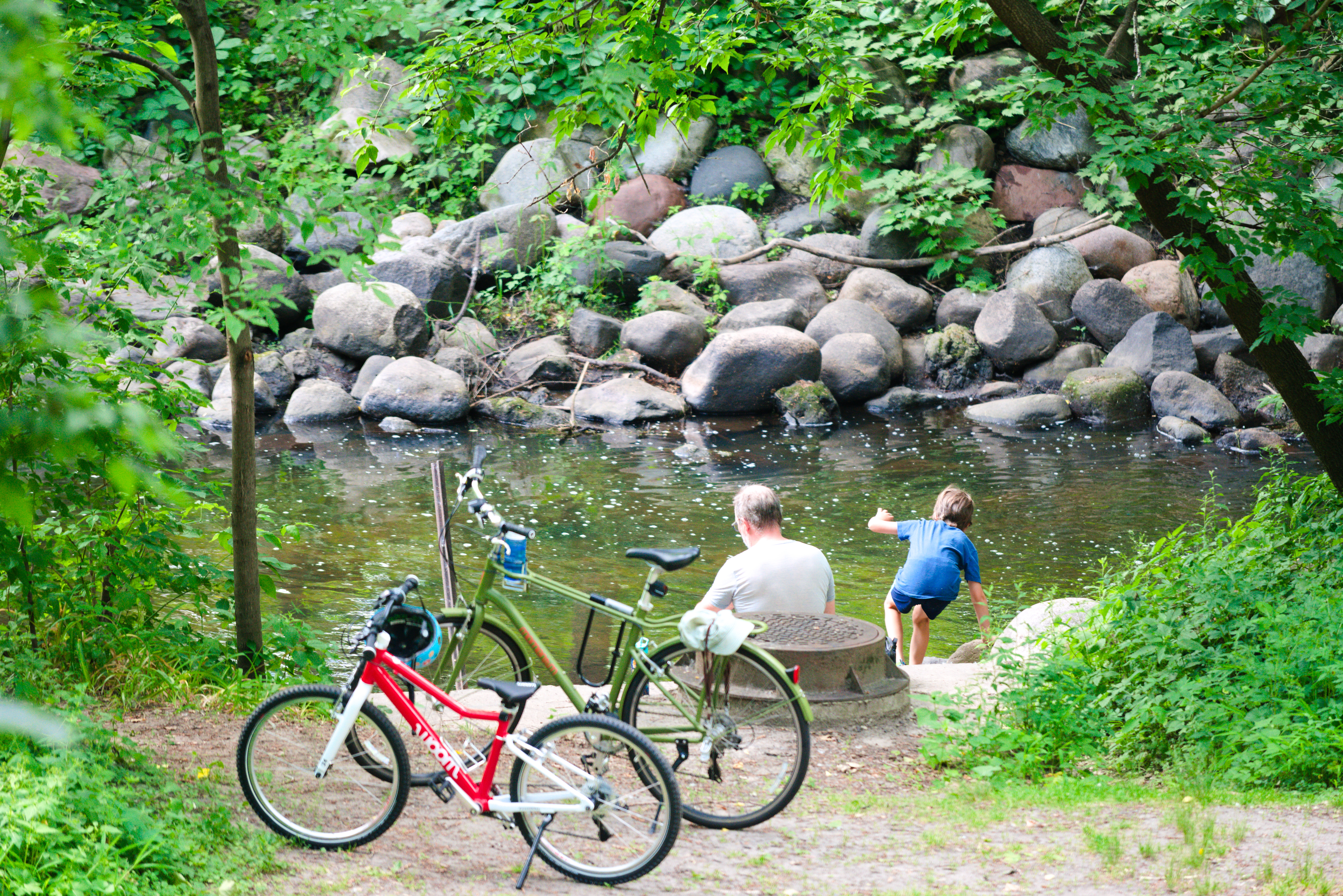
Minnehaha Creek

Lynnhurst lies southeast of Lake Harriet and includes a portion of Minnehaha Creek, which flows eastward through the neighborhood before continuing toward Minnehaha Falls.

The creek runs alongside Minnehaha Parkway, part of the Grand Rounds Scenic Byway parkway system that connects many of Minneapolis's lakes and parks. The neighborhood is characterized by tree-lined residential streets and proximity to several major recreational areas in southwest Minneapolis.

Lynnhurst is a part of Minneapolis City Council ward 13 and state legislative district 61B.

== Demographics ==
Race/ethnicity
Race/ethnicity	2000		2010		2020	
Race/ethnicity	Number	%	Number	%	Number	%
White alone	5,257	93.66	5,267	90.41	5,158	85.87
Black alone	66	1.18	146	2.51	145	2.41
Hispanic or Latino (any race)	68	1.21	122	2.09	202	3.36
Native American alone	8	0.14	12	0.21	10	0.17
Asian alone	137	2.44	145	2.49	148	2.46
Other race alone	3	0.05	9	0.15	33	0.55
Pacific Islander alone	3	0.05	0	0.03	1	0.02
Two or more races	71	1.26	120	2.06	310	5.16
Total	5,613	100.0	5,826	100.0	6,007	100.0

== Housing ==
Most homes in Lynnhurst were constructed between approximately 1905 and 1930 during a period of rapid residential growth in Minneapolis.

Common architectural styles in the neighborhood include Craftsman, Tudor Revival, Colonial Revival, and American Foursquare houses.

== Parks and recreation ==
Lynnhurst Park is the primary park in the neighborhood. Operated by the Minneapolis Park and Recreation Board, it includes baseball and softball fields, tennis courts, playgrounds, and a recreation center with gymnasium and meeting facilities.

Nearby recreational areas include Lake Harriet and the trails along Minnehaha Creek.

== Education ==
Public schools in the neighborhood include Burroughs Community School. The Lynnhurst Recreation Center, part of the Minneapolis parks system, includes a gymnasium, meeting rooms, and other facilities; nearby Lynnhurst Park includes baseball and softball fields, a playground, and tennis courts. Washburn Library, a branch of the Hennepin County Library system, stands next to Minnehaha Creek near the southeast corner of the district. Houses of worship include Shir Tikvah and Mount Olivet Lutheran Church. Shops and restaurants are clustered near the eastern edge of the district. Metro Transit provides bus service on neighborhood thoroughfares.

The Lynnhurst Neighborhood Association holds meetings each month.
