= East Harriet, Minneapolis =

Coordinates: 44.9292°N 93.2935°W

East Harriet East Harriet Farmstead
- Neighborhood
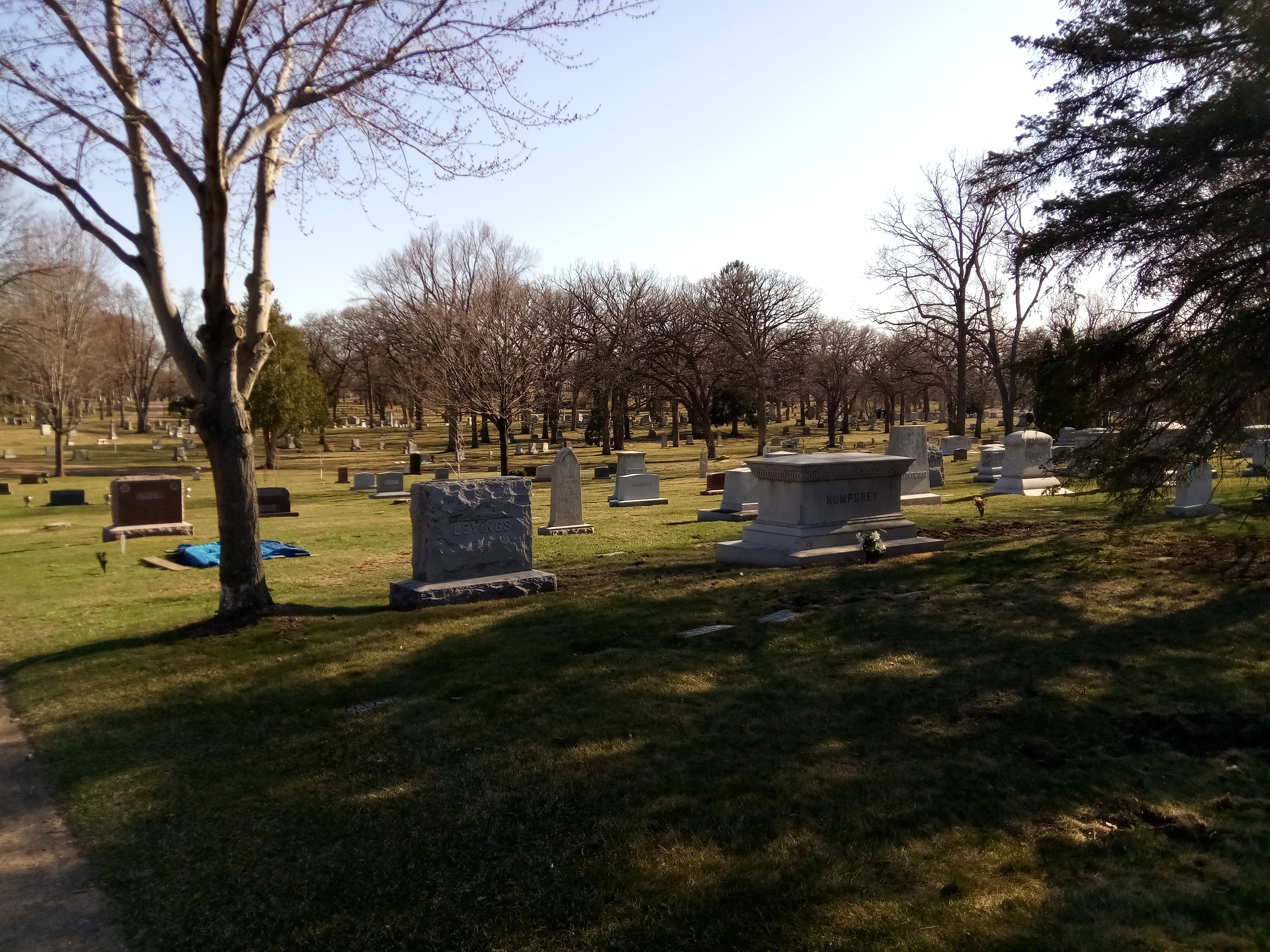
- Lakewood Cemetery

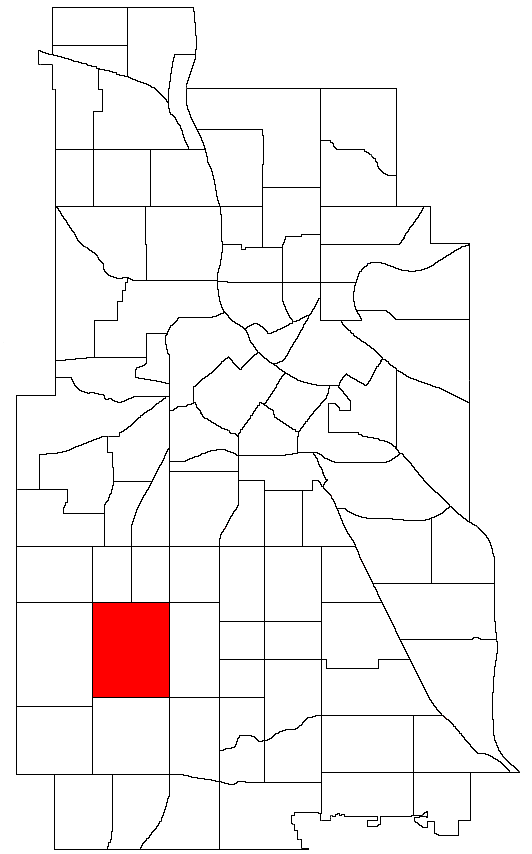
- Location of East Harriet within the U.S. city of Minneapolis
- Interactive map of East Harriet
- Country: United States
- State: Minnesota
- County: Hennepin
- City: Minneapolis
- Community: Southwest
- Founded: 1849
- City Council Ward: 13

Government
  - Council Member: Linea Palmisano

Area
  - Total: 1.224 sq mi (3.17 km^{2})

Population (2020)
  - Total: 3,654
  - Density: 2,985/sq mi (1,153/km^{2})
- Time zone: UTC-6 (CST)
  - Summer (DST): UTC-5 (CDT)
- ZIP code: 55408, 55409
- Area code: 612

Historical population
Census	Pop.	Note	%±
1980	3,864		—
1990	3,954		2.3%
2000	3,999		1.1%
2010	3,604		−9.9%
2020	3,654		1.4%

East Harriet is a neighborhood in the Southwest community in Minneapolis. Its boundaries are West 36th Street to the north, Lyndale Avenue South to the east, West 46th Street to the south, and Lake Harriet, Lakewood Cemetery, and William Berry Parkway to the west.

The home of Theodore Wirth, longtime architect of the Minneapolis park system, is on the neighborhood's west side.

East Harriet is a part of Ward 13, represented by Minneapolis City Council member Linea Palmisano. Until the 2022 redistricting based on the 2020 census, most of the neighborhood was part of Ward 10. It is within state legislative district 61B.

== Demographics ==
Race/ethnicity
Race/ethnicity	2000		2010		2020	
Race/ethnicity	Number	%	Number	%	Number	%
White alone	3,654	91.37	3,117	86.49	3,031	83.75
Black alone	148	3.70	171	4.74	126	3.48
Hispanic or Latino (any race)	55	1.38	92	2.55	167	4.61
Native American alone	12	0.30	10	0.28	16	0.44
Asian alone	53	1.33	80	2.22	94	2.60
Other race alone	1	0.03	7	0.19	22	0.61
Pacific Islander alone	0	0.00	4	0.11	0	0.00
Two or more races	76	1.90	123	3.41	163	4.50
Total	3,999	100.0	3,604	100.0	3,619	100.0

== Schools ==
- Lyndale Community School (K-5), 312 West 34th Street, Minneapolis, MN 55408 : (612) 668-4000 : Map
- Ramsey Middle School (6-8), 1 West 49th Street Minneapolis, MN 55419 : (612) 668.0455 Map
- Washburn Senior High School (9-12), 201 West 49th Street, Minneapolis, MN 55419-5588 : (612) 668-3400 : Map

== Businesses ==
- Businesses in East Harriet
