= Kenny, Minneapolis =

Coordinates: 44.8989°N 93.2960°W

Kenny
- Neighborhood
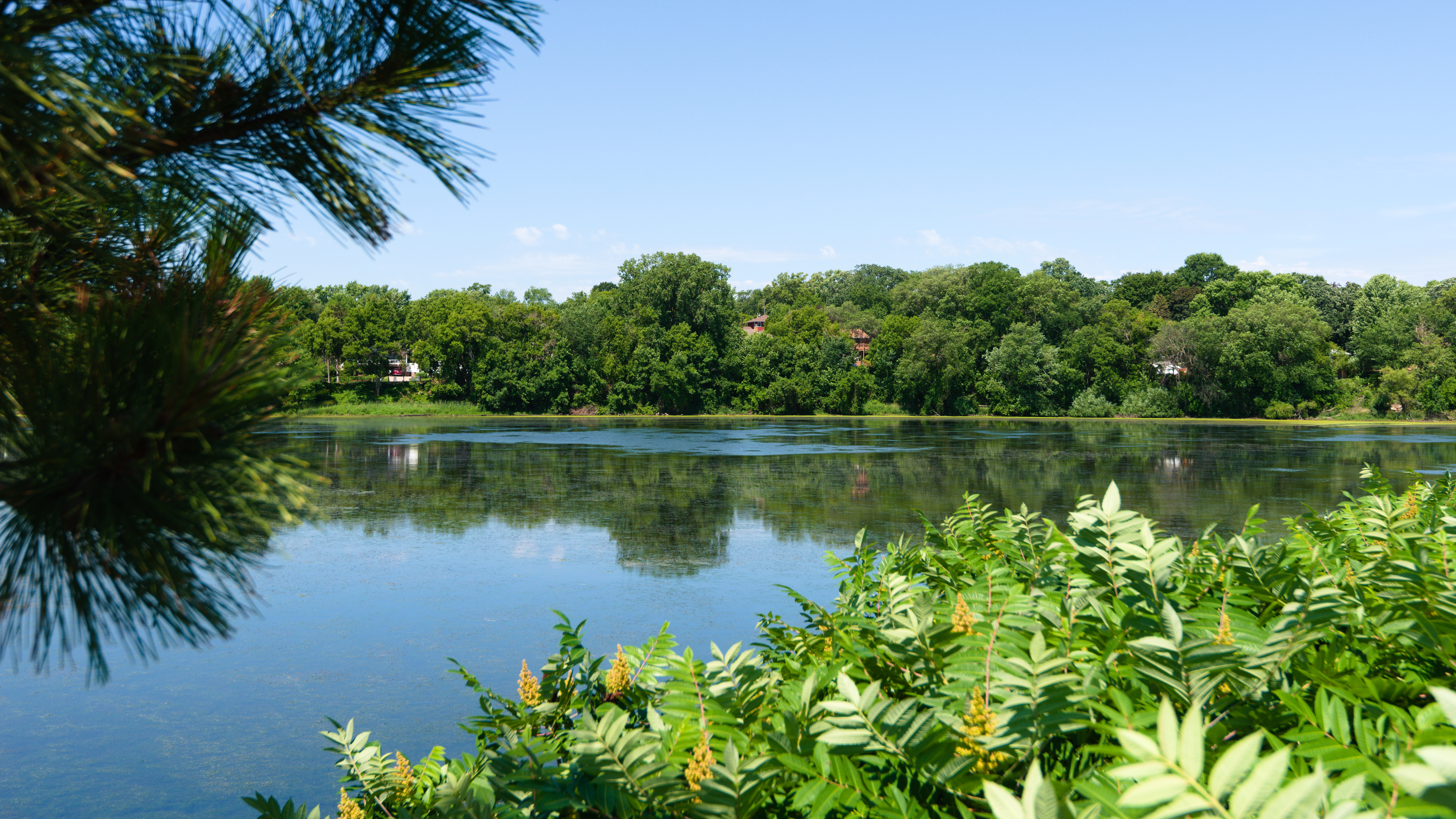
- Grass Lake

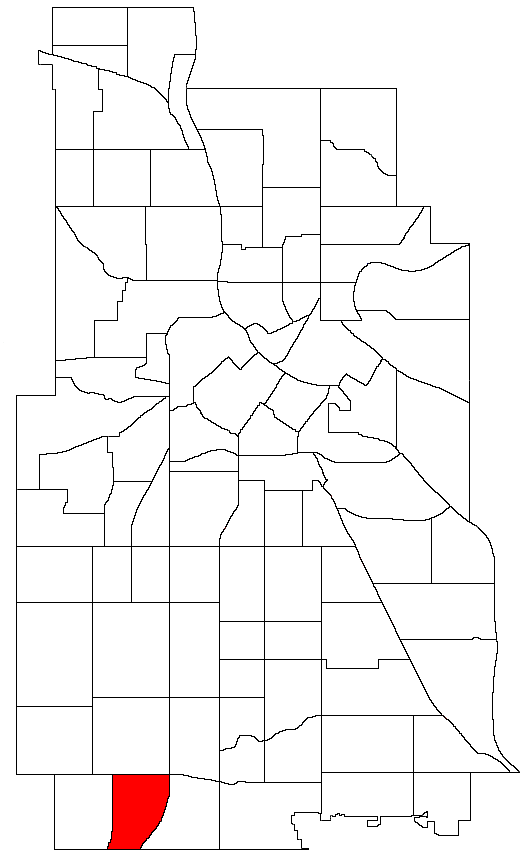
- Location of Kenny within the U.S. city of Minneapolis
- Interactive map of Kenny
- Country: United States
- State: Minnesota
- County: Hennepin
- City: Minneapolis
- Community: Southwest
- Founded: 1849
- City Council Ward: 13

Government
  - Council Member: Linea Palmisano

Area
  - Total: 0.643 sq mi (1.67 km^{2})
  - Land: 0.609 sq mi (1.58 km^{2})
  - Water: 0.034 sq mi (0.088 km^{2})

Population (2020)
  - Total: 3,932
  - Density: 6,460/sq mi (2,490/km^{2})
- Time zone: UTC-6 (CST)
  - Summer (DST): UTC-5 (CDT)
- ZIP code: 55419
- Area code: 612

Historical population
Census	Pop.	Note	%±
1980	4,081		—
1990	3,708		−9.1%
2000	3,493		−5.8%
2010	3,523		0.9%
2020	3,932		11.6%

Kenny is a neighborhood in the Southwest community in Minneapolis. Its boundaries are West 54th Street to the north, Lyndale Avenue South and Highway 121 to the east, West 62nd Street (Highway 62) to the south, and Logan Avenue South to the west. Kenny is a part of Ward 13, and state legislative districts 61B and 63B.

Kenny contains one body of water called Grass Lake. It has one elementary school called Kenny Elementary School, and has one middle school called Susan B. Anthony Middle School.

== Demographics ==
Race/ethnicity
Race/ethnicity	2000		2010		2020	
Race/ethnicity	Number	%	Number	%	Number	%
White alone	3,245	92.90	3,147	88.42	3,349	86.65
Black alone	55	1.57	91	2.56	96	2.48
Hispanic or Latino (any race)	49	1.40	120	3.37	106	2.74
Native American alone	7	0.20	7	0.20	7	0.18
Asian alone	80	2.29	108	3.03	98	2.53
Other race alone	2	0.06	5	0.14	10	0.26
Pacific Islander alone	6	0.17	0	0.00	0	0.00
Two or more races	49	1.40	81	2.28	199	5.15
Total	3,493	100.0	3,559	100.0	3,865	100.0
