= King Field, Minneapolis =

King Field Kingfield
- Neighborhood
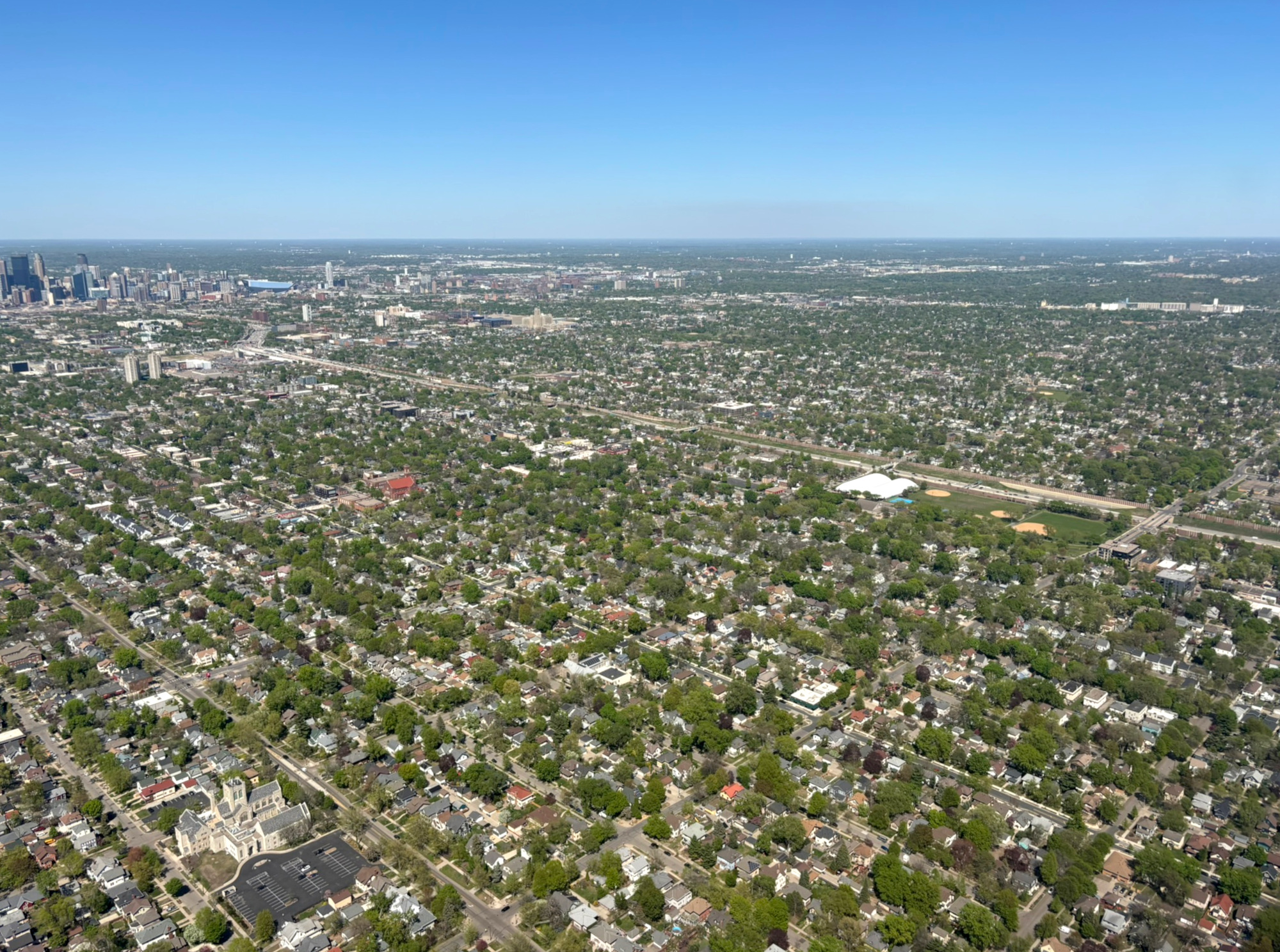
- King Field neighborhood in Minneapolis

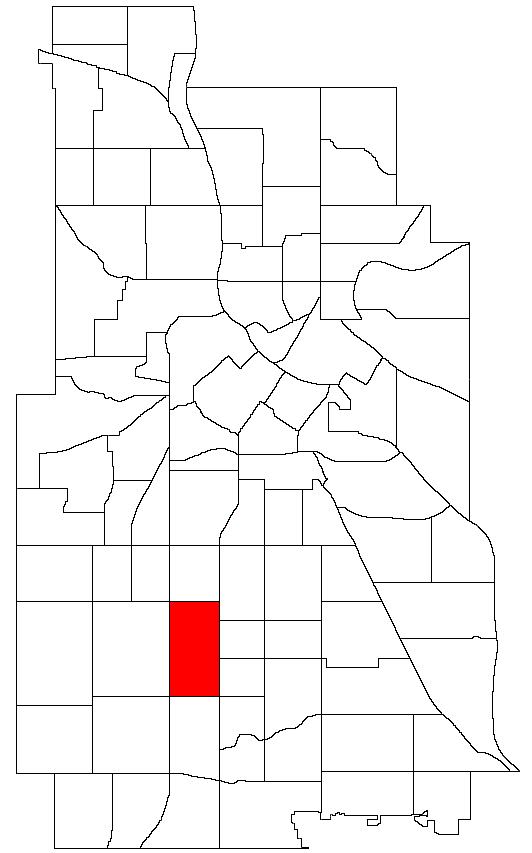
- Location of King Field within the U.S. city of Minneapolis
- Interactive map of King Field
- Country: United States
- State: Minnesota
- County: Hennepin
- City: Minneapolis
- Community: Southwest
- Founded: 1849
- Named for: William S. King
- City Council Ward: 8

Government
  - Council Member: Soren Stevenson

Area
  - Total: 0.828 sq mi (2.14 km^{2})

Population (2020)
  - Total: 7,576
  - Density: 9,150/sq mi (3,530/km^{2})
- Time zone: UTC-6 (CST)
  - Summer (DST): UTC-5 (CDT)
- ZIP code: 55409
- Area code: 612

Historical population
Census	Pop.	Note	%±
1980	8,443		—
1990	7,884		−6.6%
2000	7,816		−0.9%
2010	7,473		−4.4%
2020	7,576		1.4%

King Field (alternately, Kingfield) is a neighborhood in the Southwest community in Minneapolis, Minnesota. Its boundaries are 36th Street to the north, Interstate 35W to the east, 46th Street to the south, and Lyndale Avenue to the west. King Field, within the King Field neighborhood, is a park named after Martin Luther King Jr.

Kingfield is a part of Minneapolis City Council ward 8 and state legislative districts 62A and 62B.

== History ==
King Field is named after Colonel William S. King. The neighborhood is in Minneapolis's Southwest community between Interstate 35W on the east and Lyndale Avenue on the west. The northern boundary is 36th Street and the southern boundary is 46th Street.

In 1885, the southern border of the city of Minneapolis was 38th Street. By 1887 the city had expanded its borders to 54th street, and thus the area which is now King Field became part of Minneapolis. King Field is mainly a residential area, with three-fourths of its single-family houses built before 1920. The King Field neighborhood has a number of amenities, including churches, schools, a park named after Martin Luther King Jr., and three to four dozen small businesses.

=== Early history ===
The area was farm country in the second half of the 19th century. Transportation was by horse and buggy. Fewer than 20 farms had been established by 1874. C.C. Garvey owned a dairy farm near 44th Street and Grand Ave. George Bichnell farmed 18 acres (73,000 m^{2}) of land from Lyndale to Pleasant, 42nd to 43rd Streets. Hiram Van Nest farmed 28 acres (110,000 m^{2}) of land from 40th to 42nd, Pleasant to Lyndale. The Farmsworth farm occupied 57 acres (230,000 m^{2}) south of 47th Street and East of Nicollet.

The area between Lake Street and 40th Street was largely built between 1903 and 1914 with Colonial Revival houses and Craftsman bungalows. After World War I, the area south of 40th Street and north of Minnehaha Creek was developed. The Church of the Incarnation opened in 1918 at the intersection of 38th Street and Pleasant Avenue. It was added to the National Register of Historic Places in 2022 and is a city of Minneapolis historic district.

== Demographics ==
Race/ethnicity
Race/ethnicity	2000		2010		2020	
Race/ethnicity	Number	%	Number	%	Number	%
White alone	5,931	75.88	5,646	75.55	5,780	74.54
Black alone	737	9.43	641	8.58	515	6.64
Hispanic or Latino (any race)	603	7.71	679	9.09	754	9.72
Native American alone	89	1.14	62	0.83	57	0.74
Asian alone	165	2.11	155	2.07	185	2.39
Other race alone	30	0.38	40	0.54	36	0.46
Pacific Islander alone	2	0.03	1	0.01	1	0.01
Two or more races	259	3.31	249	3.33	426	5.49
Total	7,816	100.0	7,473	100.0	7,754	100.0

== Street names ==
The following is a list of streets in King Field, and the origin of their names:

- Blaisdell Ave. named in honor of Robert Blaisdell, Sr. and his three sons, who were early pioneers here and lumbermen on the upper Mississippi river
- Garfield Ave. named after President James Garfield
- Grand Ave. from the French, meaning "great" or "noble"
- Harriet Ave. named after the wife of Colonel Leavenworth, whose maiden name was Harriet Lovejoy. (She is also the source of the name Lake Harriet.) Leavenworth was the first commandant of a temporary fort known in 1819 as Fort St. Anthony.
- Lyndale Avenue named after the 1,400-acre (5.7 km^{2}) Lyndale farm owned by William S. King, which bordered Lake Harriet and Bde Maka Ska. The farm was named in honor of King’s father, Reverend Lyndon King.
- Pleasant Ave. as the name implies
- Pillsbury Ave. named in honor of Governor John S. Pillsbury.
- Wentworth Ave.
- Van Nest Ave. named after Hiram Van Nest, one of the earliest settlers in the vicinity of Saint Anthony Falls, the birthplace of Minneapolis. He invested in real estate almost as soon as Minneapolis was open to settlement.
- Nicollet Avenue commemorates Joseph Nicollet, geographer and explorer whose maps of the area, now Minnesota and the eastern part of North and South Dakota, were published in 1843.
- Stevens Ave. named after Colonel John H. Stevens, a pioneer who built Minneapolis's first permanent dwelling in 1850

Taken from “Early History of the Kingfield Neighborhood”, a new resident handout circa 1992 via Kingfield Neighborhood Association Web Site [2]

== Schools ==
- Barton Community School (K-5), 4237 Colfax Ave S, Minneapolis 55409
- Lyndale Community School (K-5), 312 West 34th Street, Minneapolis, MN 55408
- Justice Page School (6-8), 1 West 49th Street Minneapolis, MN 55419
- Washburn High School (9-12), 201 West 49th Street, Minneapolis, MN 55419
- Lake Country Montessori School (K-8) 3755 Pleasant Ave S, Minneapolis, MN 55409
