= Windom, Minneapolis =

Neighborhood in Minneapolis, Minnesota, United States

Coordinates: 44.8946°N 93.2809°W

Windom
- Neighborhood
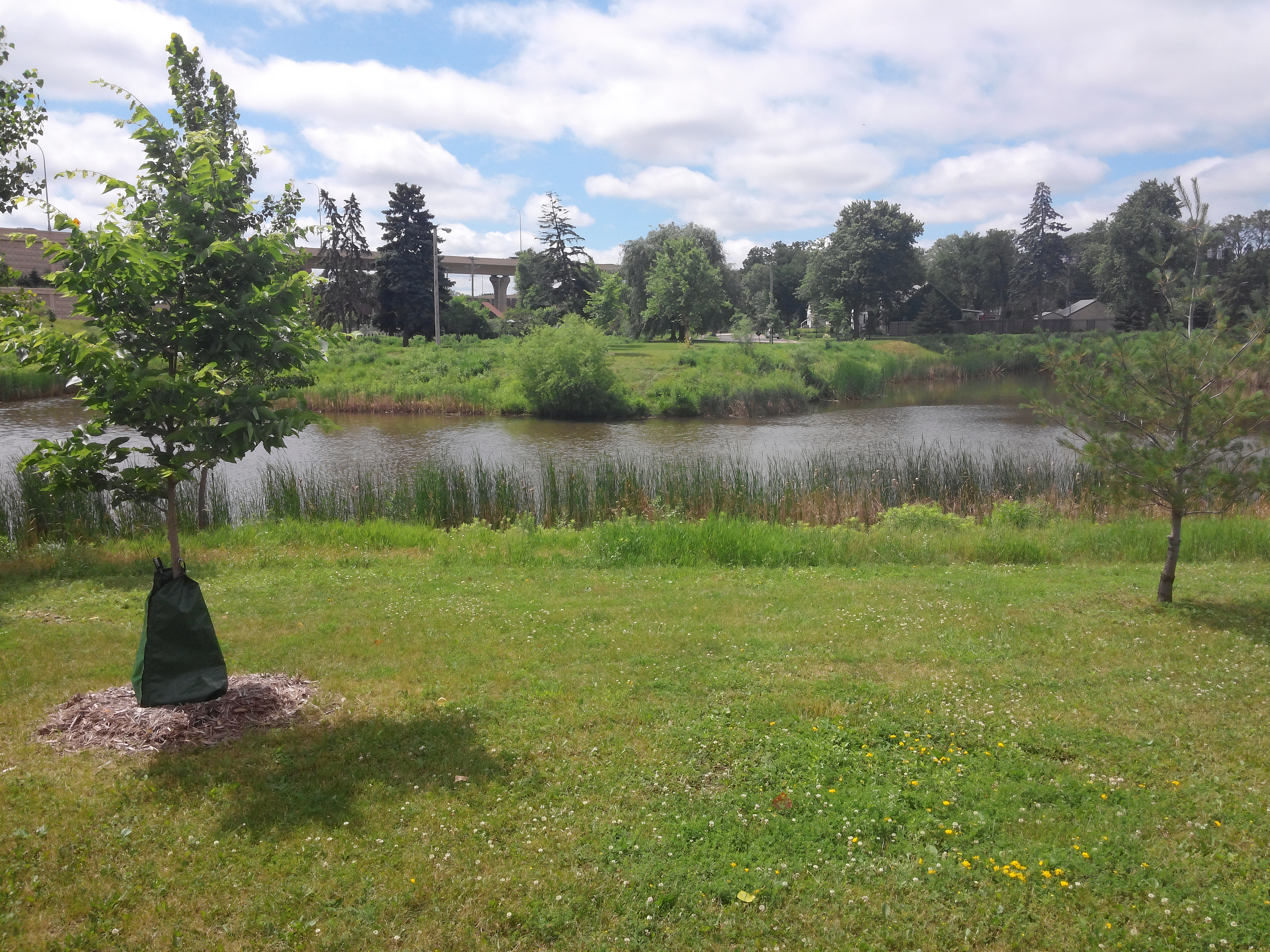
- Lake Mead

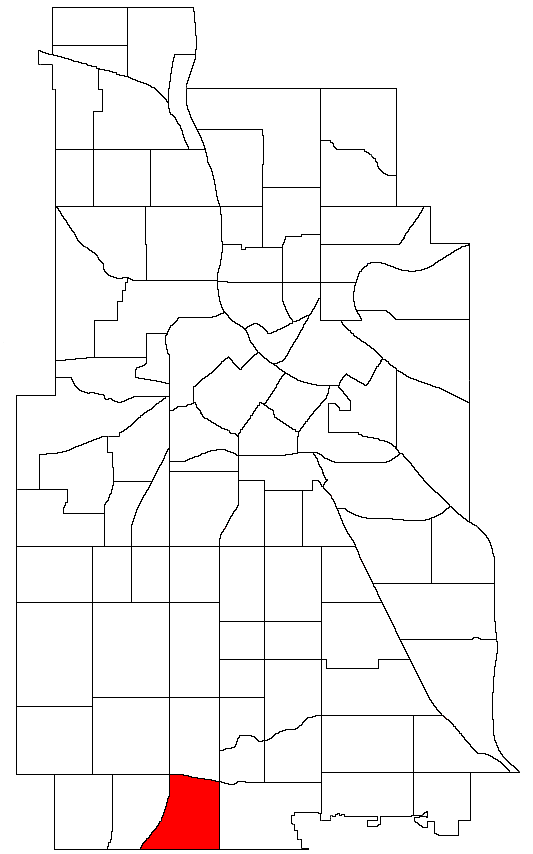
- Location of Windom within the U.S. city of Minneapolis
- Interactive map of Windom
- Country: United States
- State: Minnesota
- County: Hennepin
- City: Minneapolis
- Community: Southwest
- Founded: 1849
- City Council Ward: 11

Government
  - Council Member: Jamison Whiting

Area
  - Total: 0.749 sq mi (1.94 km^{2})

Population (2020)
  - Total: 5,386
  - Density: 7,190/sq mi (2,780/km^{2})
- Time zone: UTC-6 (CST)
  - Summer (DST): UTC-5 (CDT)
- ZIP code: 55419
- Area code: 612

Historical population
Census	Pop.	Note	%±
1980	5,061		—
1990	5,188		2.5%
2000	4,984		−3.9%
2010	4,980		−0.1%
2020	5,386		8.2%

The Windom neighborhood is located in the Southwest community of Minneapolis. Its borders are Diamond Lake Road and West 54th Street to the north, Interstate 35W to the east, West 62nd Street (Highway 62) to the south, and Lyndale Avenue South and Highway 121 to the west. Windom is a part of ward 11 of the Minneapolis City Council and state legislative district 63B.

On August 27, 2025, Windom was the site of a mass shooting targeting the Annunciation Catholic Church. Two schoolchildren were killed and there were multiple injuries. The FBI is investigating the shooting as an anti-Catholic hate crime and as an act of domestic terrorism.

== Demographics ==
Race/ethnicity
Race/ethnicity	2000		2010		2020	
Race/ethnicity	Number	%	Number	%	Number	%
White alone	3,492	70.06	3,036	60.96	3,023	58.48
Black alone	299	6.00	508	10.20	658	12.73
Hispanic or Latino (any race)	155	3.11	176	3.53	494	9.56
Native American alone	41	0.82	61	1.22	24	0.46
Asian alone	126	2.53	130	2.61	143	2.77
Other race alone	8	0.16	17	0.34	11	0.21
Pacific Islander alone	4	0.08	6	0.12	0	0.00
Two or more races	181	3.63	210	4.22	317	6.13
Total	4,984	100.0	4,980	100.0	5,169	100.0

== Businesses ==
- Businesses in Windom Neighborhood, Minneapolis'
