= Linden Hills, Minneapolis =

Linden Hills
- Neighborhood
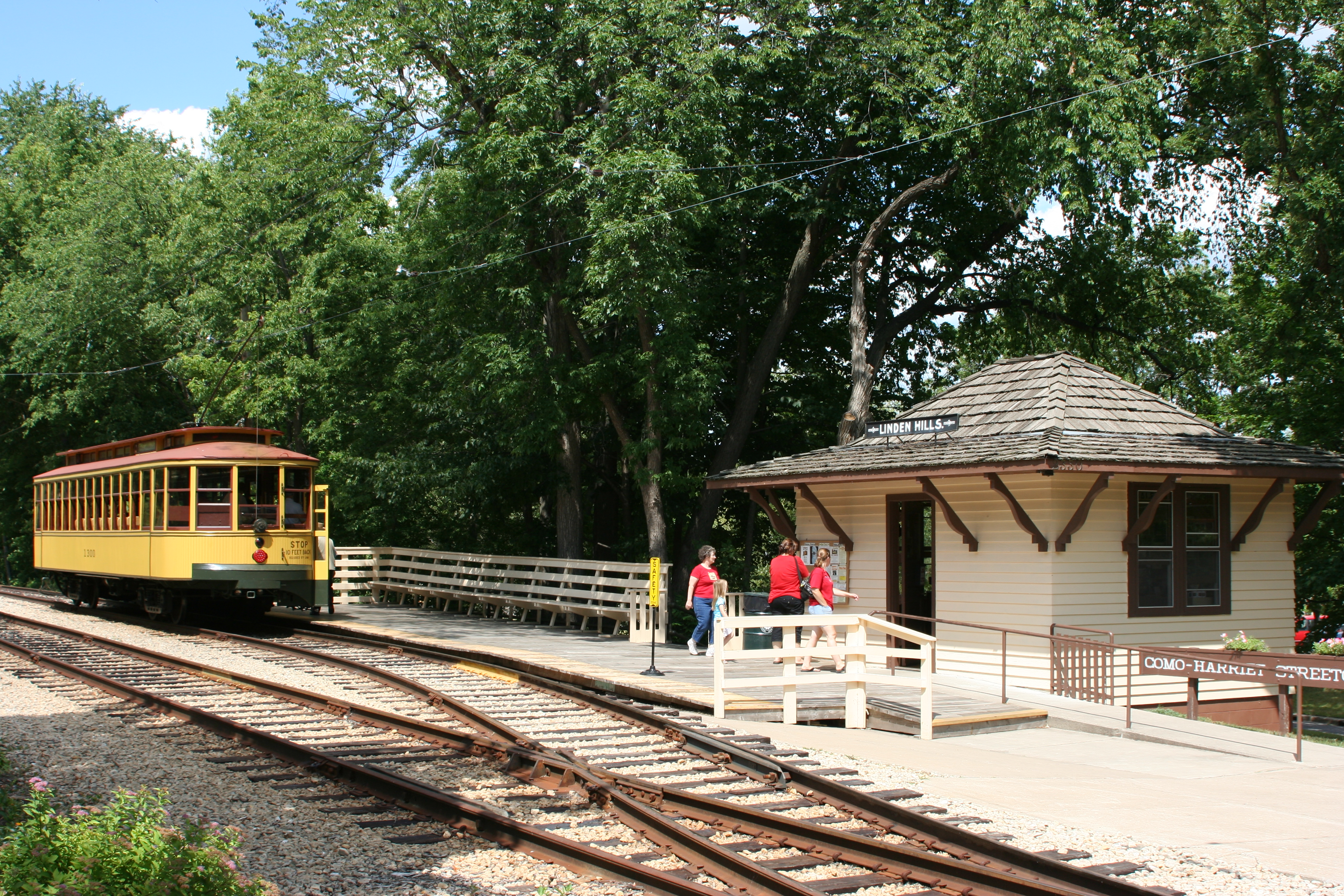
- The Como-Harriet Streetcar Line in Linden Hills
- Motto: The Small Town in The City
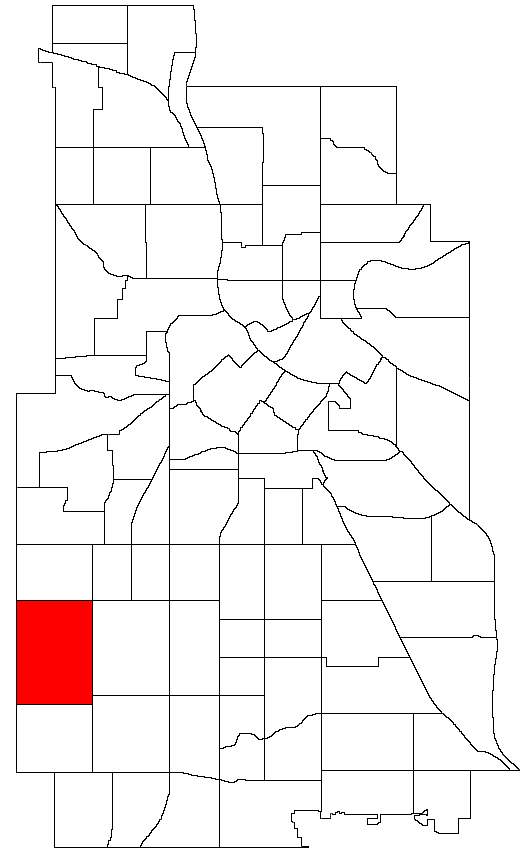
- Location of Linden Hills within the U.S. city of Minneapolis
- Interactive map of Linden Hills
- Country: United States
- State: Minnesota
- County: Hennepin
- City: Minneapolis
- Community: Southwest
- Founded: 1849
- City Council Ward: 13

Government
  - Council Member: Linea Palmisano

Area
  - Total: 1.393 sq mi (3.61 km^{2})

Population (2020)
  - Total: 7,838
  - Density: 5,627/sq mi (2,172/km^{2})
- Time zone: UTC-6 (CST)
  - Summer (DST): UTC-5 (CDT)
- ZIP code: 55410, 55416
- Area code: 612

Linden Hills is a neighborhood in the Southwest community of Minneapolis on a hill overlooking Lake Harriet. It was one of the last areas to be developed in the City of Minneapolis. It is bordered to the north by Bde Maka Ska and West 36th Street, to the east by Lake Harriet and William Berry Parkway, to the south by West 47th Street, and to the west by France Avenue. Southwest High School is located at the southern edge of the neighborhood on West 47th Street between Abbott and Chowen Avenues. The neighborhood is named for the linden trees and rolling hills found in the area.

The majority of Linden Hills is in ward 13, though parts of the Minikahda Club golf course within Linden Hills rest in Ward 7. It is also within state legislative district 61B.

According to the 2000 U.S. Census, there were 7,370 people in the neighborhood, of whom 94% were white, 1% were black, 0.5% were Native American, 2% were Asian American/Pacific Islander, and 2.5% were other/two or more races.

== History ==
A majority of the land around where neighborhood is today was cottages and open land until the 1870s. The area started growing following the extension of the Como-Harriet Streetcar Line through the neighborhood. It gained a reputation as popular destination area for the young and wealthy of Minneapolis to get away from the city.

The Lake Harriet Bandshell is located on the lakeshore on the eastern edge of the neighborhood. The current bandshell, constructed in 1985, is a fifth-generation music venue on the lake. The first two were destroyed by fire, the third was destroyed by a wind storm, and the fourth was demolished in 1985. The main platform and carbarn of the Como-Harriet Streetcar Line are also located in the neighborhood, near West 42nd Street and Queen Avenue.

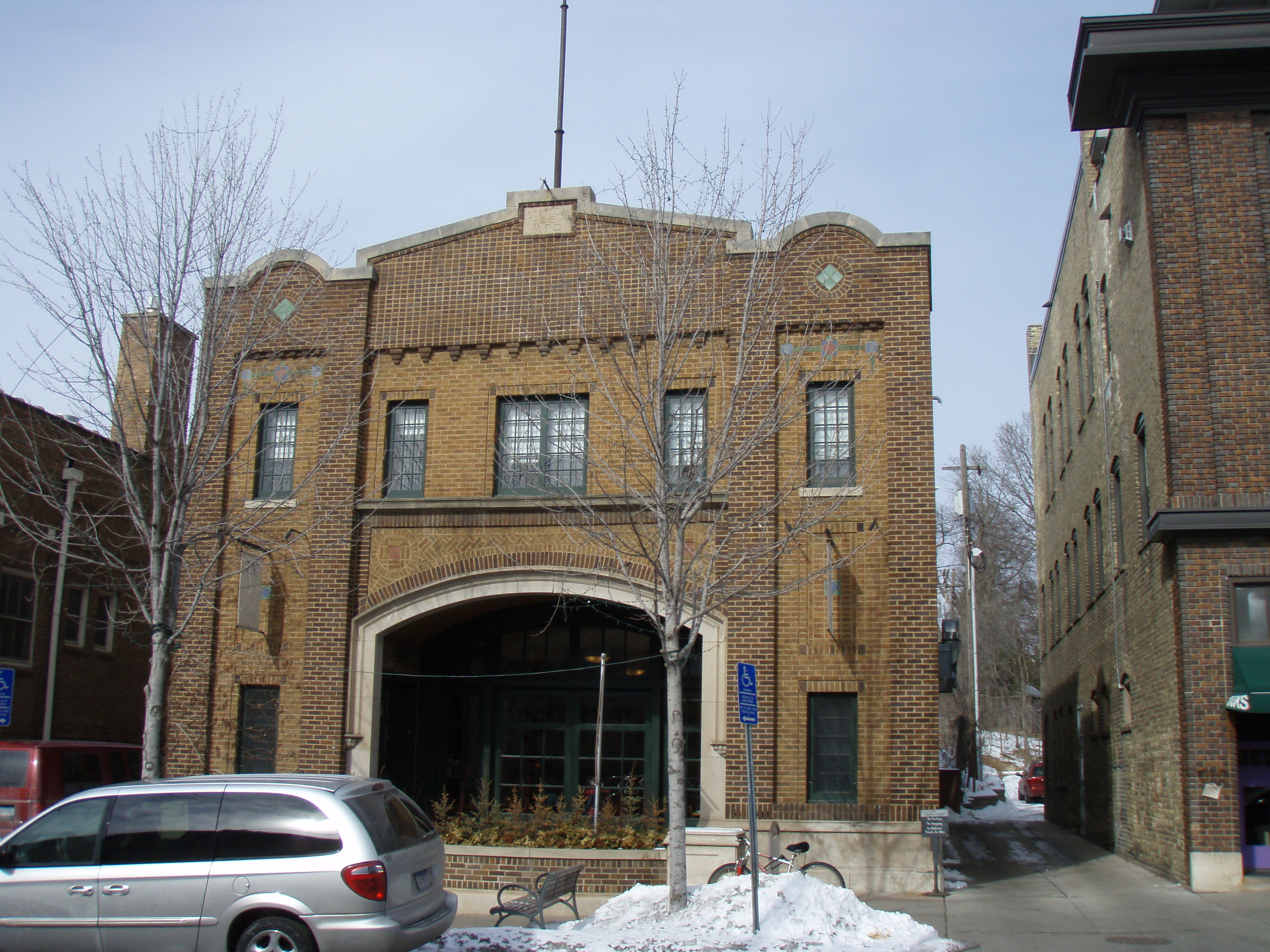
Former Minneapolis Fire Department Station 28 (now a restaurant and offices) is in the commercial area of the neighborhood, and is listed on the National Register of Historic Places

The neighborhood's commercial corridor, centering on Upton Avenue and 43rd Street, was constructed along the Como-Harriet streetcar line in the 1920s and is today home to many shops and dining establishments. It was the home of the second location of what became the Famous Dave's restaurant chain in 1995 and was designed like an old-fashioned BBQ shack; it was closed in 2014 after the property was sold for redevelopment into a denser mixed-use project of condominiums and retail.

The Linden Hills area was featured in a scene of the 1996 film Jingle All The Way.

Historical population
Census	Pop.	Note	%±
1980	8,220		—
1990	7,678		−6.6%
2000	7,370		−4.0%
2010	7,564		2.6%
2020	7,838		3.6%

== Demographics ==
Race/ethnicity
Race/ethnicity	2000		2010		2020	
Race/ethnicity	Number	%	Number	%	Number	%
White alone	6,838	92.78	6,718	89.05	6,843	83.35
Black alone	93	1.26	177	2.35	183	2.23
Hispanic or Latino (any race)	121	1.64	215	2.85	362	4.41
Native American alone	31	0.42	13	0.17	17	0.21
Asian alone	145	1.97	206	2.73	258	3.14
Other race alone	14	0.19	14	0.19	37	0.45
Pacific Islander alone	1	0.01	4	0.05	4	0.05
Two or more races	127	1.72	197	2.61	506	6.16
Total	7,370	100.0	7,544	100.0	8,210	100.0
