= Armatage, Minneapolis =

Coordinates: 44.8984°N 93.3111°W

Armatage
- Neighborhood
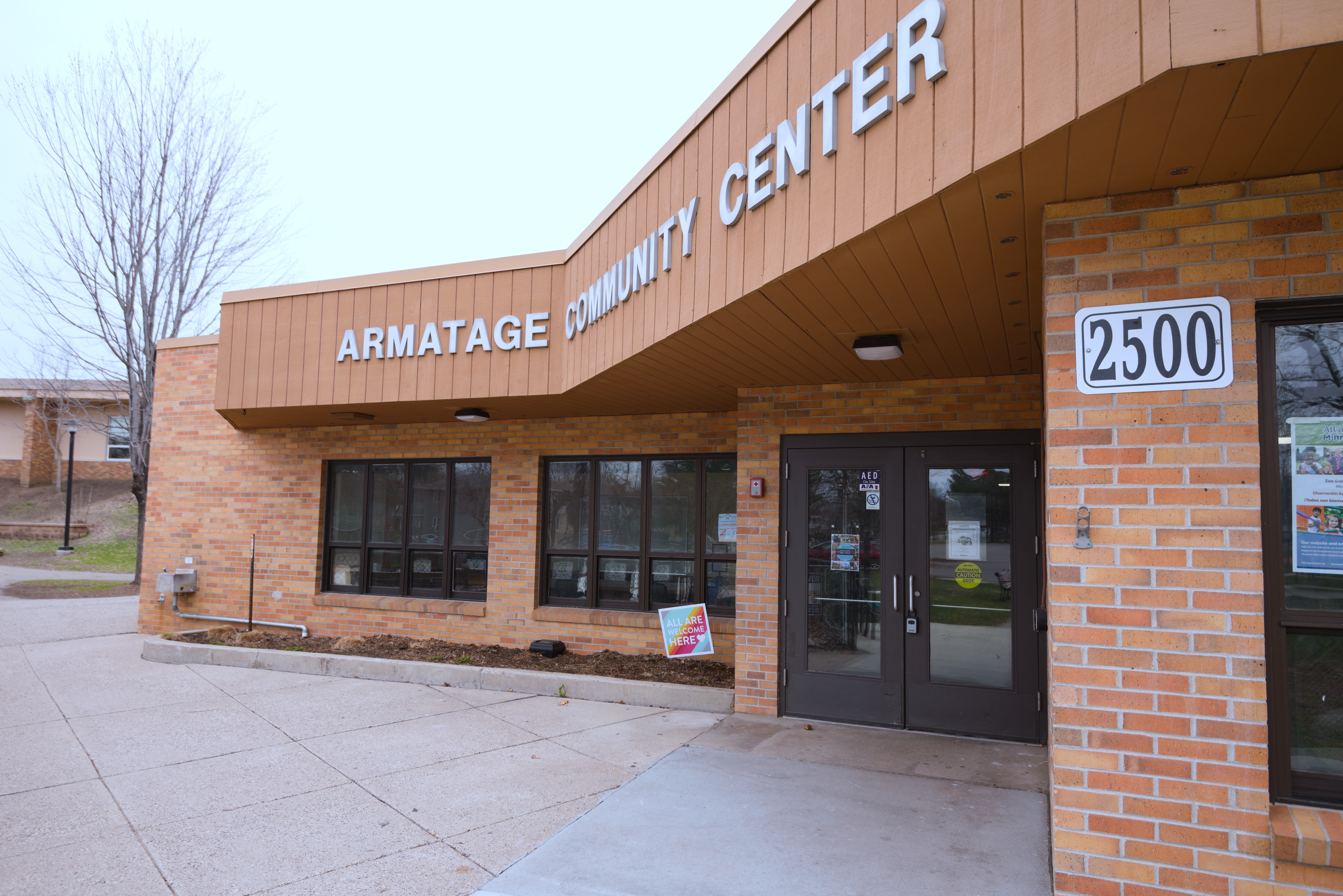
- Armatage Community Center

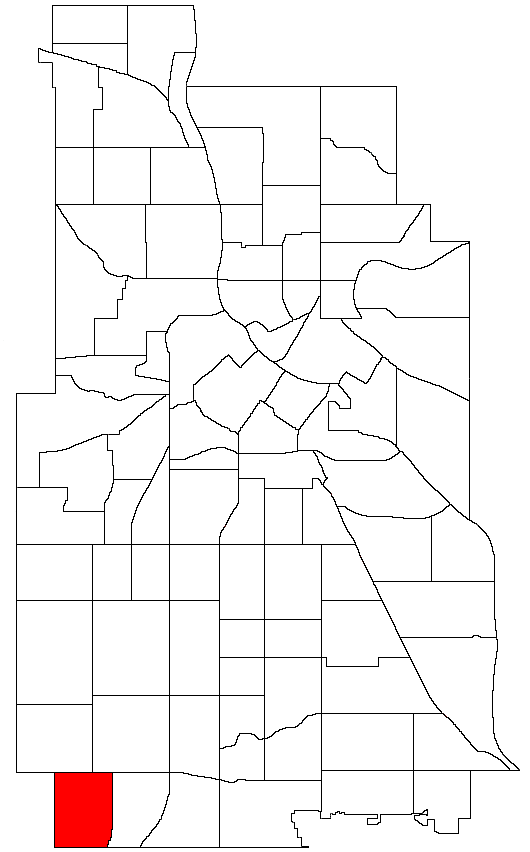
- Location of Armatage within the U.S. city of Minneapolis
- Interactive map of Armatage
- Country: United States
- State: Minnesota
- County: Hennepin
- City: Minneapolis
- Community: Southwest
- Founded: 1849
- City Council Ward: 13

Government
  - Council Member: Linea Palmisano

Area
  - Total: 0.742 sq mi (1.92 km^{2})

Population (2020)
  - Total: 5,448
  - Density: 7,340/sq mi (2,830/km^{2})
- Time zone: UTC-6 (CST)
  - Summer (DST): UTC-5 (CDT)
- ZIP code: 55410, 55419
- Area code: 612

Historical population
Census	Pop.	Note	%±
1980	5,428		—
1990	4,881		−10.1%
2000	4,759		−2.5%
2010	4,895		2.9%
2020	5,448		11.3%

Armatage is a neighborhood in the Southwest community in Minneapolis. In the city's southwest corner, the neighborhood is bounded on the north by 54th Street West, on the east by Logan Avenue South, on the south by Highway 62, and on the west by the city limits at Xerxes Avenue South. Armatage is a part of Minneapolis City Council ward 13, currently represented by Minneapolis City Council member Linea Palmisano. It sits in state legislative districts 61B and 63B.

The neighborhood grew around the school named for Maude Armatage, a distinguished community leader. Armatage is built up with mostly single-family housing and some multifamily buildings. The neighborhood also has a park with a community center.

The neighborhood's retail space consists of individual neighborhood stores and is mostly along Penn Avenue South. The great majority of housing was built between 1949 and 1969, while about 5% of the dwellings were built before World War II.

The Armatage Neighborhood Association (ANA) was founded in 1991 as part of a citywide effort to increase opportunities for residents to connect with the city and allow neighborhoods to address local concerns. ANA board members serve a one-year term commencing in May. The Armatage Summer Festival is an annual party in August at Armatage Park held in partnership with Armatage Park.

== Demographics ==
In 2020, Armatage had a population of about 5,400. About 95% of residents 5 and older speak English at home. 5.8% of residents are foreign born.

Race/ethnicity
Race/ethnicity	2000		2010		2020	
Race/ethnicity	Number	%	Number	%	Number	%
White alone	4,300	90.36	3,964	81.58	4,251	79.37
Black alone	155	3.26	385	7.92	311	5.81
Hispanic or Latino (any race)	104	2.19	187	3.85	315	5.88
Native American alone	21	0.44	29	0.60	17	0.32
Asian alone	116	2.44	158	3.25	171	3.19
Other race alone	7	0.15	3	0.06	12	0.22
Pacific Islander alone	5	0.11	1	0.02	3	0.06
Two or more races	51	1.07	132	2.72	276	5.15
Total	4,759	100.0	4,859	100.0	5,356	100.0

== Businesses ==
- Businesses in Armatage Neighborhood
