= Lyndale Avenue =

Street in Minnesota, United States

- Maintained by: MnDOT and Hennepin County DOT
- South end: I-35 in Faribault
- Major junctions: MN 60 in Faribault; Bagley Avenue and Shieldsville Boulevard in Faribault; I-35W in Burnsville; Minnesota River in Bloomington; I-494 / MN 5 in Richfield–Bloomington; I-35W / MN 62 in Minneapolis–Richfield; MN 121 in Minneapolis; I-94 in Minneapolis; MN 55 in Minneapolis
- North end: 57th Avenue North in Brooklyn Center

Lyndale Avenue is a major street in the U.S. state of Minnesota that traverses the cities of Minneapolis, Brooklyn Center, Richfield, and Bloomington. A noncontiguous portion also exists in Faribault, part of Highway 21. There are several commercial districts along the street, including Lyn-Lake in South Minneapolis, Shops at Lyndale in Richfield, and the Oxboro area in Bloomington. Portions of both Interstate 94 and Interstate 35 run on the right-of-way of Lyndale Avenue.

== Route description ==
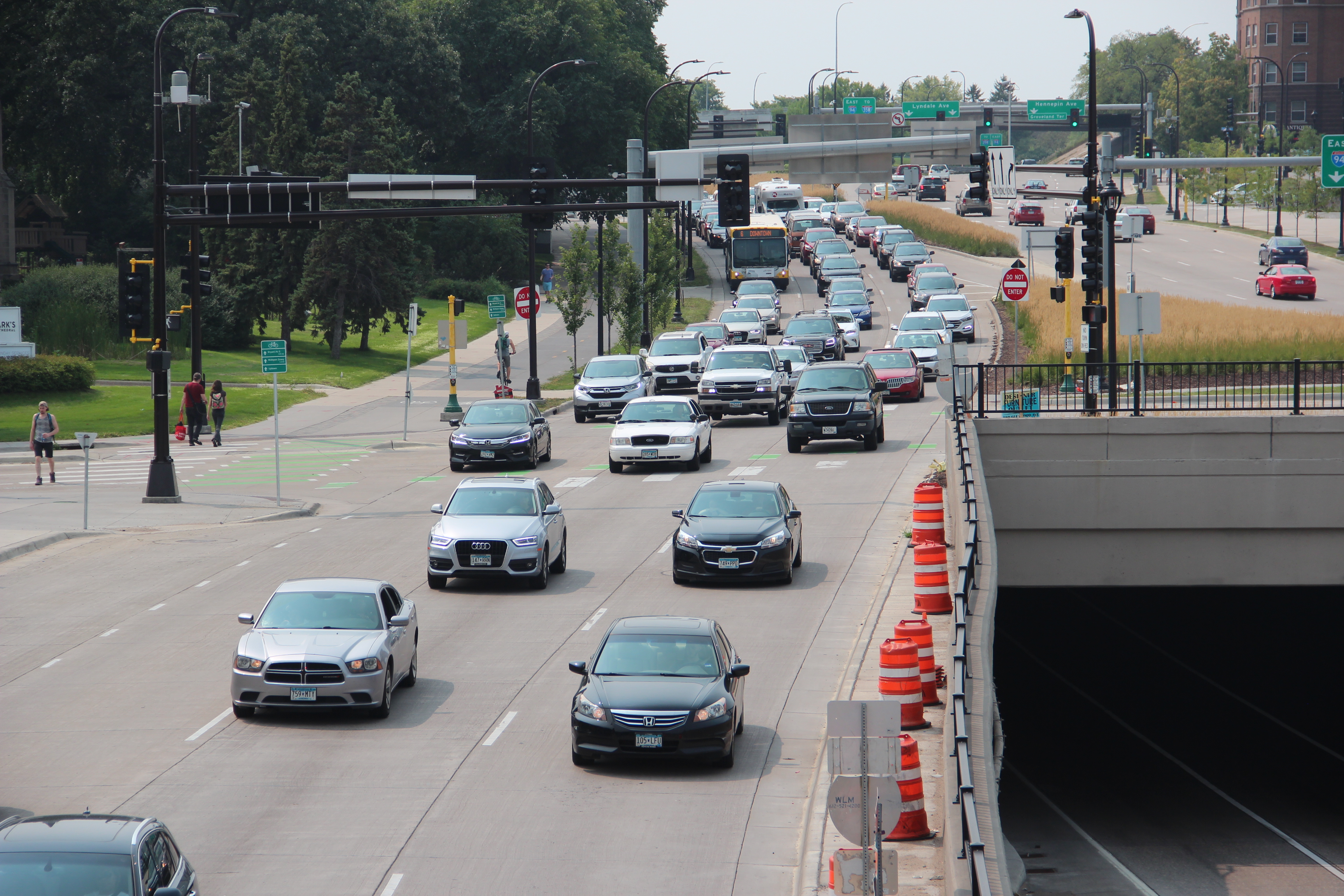
Lyndale Avenue at the Lowry Hill neighborhood in Minneapolis, August 2018

In Faribault, Lyndale Avenue is a divided four-lane highway with a 45 mph speed limit. Between Faribault and the Minnesota River, Lyndale Avenue has been replaced by Interstate 35. North of the river, the old Lyndale Avenue resumes in Bloomington. At the south edge of Bloomington, it is a two-lane road, until 106th Street. Between 106th and 102nd Streets, it is a three-lane road. Through the rest of Bloomington, the street varies in width between four and six lanes. After entering Richfield at the junction with Interstate 494. In Richfield, it is a two- to three-lane roadway with multiple roundabouts. There are major commercial districts at 98th Street, American Boulevard, 77th Street (Kensington Park and Shops at Lyndale), and 66th Street (Woodlake Center).

North of Interstate 35W / Minnesota State Highway 62, Lyndale Avenue enters Minneapolis and the street soon becomes a one-way to connect with Minnesota State Highway 121, a freeway spur connecting to I-35W. After their intersection with 56th Street West, the road again becomes a two- to three-lane roadway across Minnehaha Creek and north toward Uptown. Near the intersection with Lake Street, it becomes a three-lane as a major commercial street which remains continuous until the Virginia Triangle (the commons with Hennepin Avenue and Interstate 94). After the Triangle, Lyndale Avenue splits, with matching one-way streets on either side of Interstate 94 functioning as frontage roads. They join at Plymouth Avenue. The road remains three lanes until just north of Broadway, where it becomes a two-lane road. At 49th Avenue North, the road again diverges into matching one-way streets on either side of I-94. At 53rd Avenue North, it becomes a local street for several blocks until ending at 57th Avenue North in Brooklyn Center.

== History ==
The street was historically a rural route from Minneapolis to Faribault, though most of that route has since been replaced by Interstate 35 and I-35W. The Lyndale Avenue name is not signed on these routes. From 1926 to 1934, U.S. Highway 65 traveled concurrently along Lyndale from the Minnesota–Iowa state line to Minneapolis and St.Paul via Northfield, where the road split to its various directions, later rejoining north of the downtowns and continuing north towards Littlefork. Again, the route was not always known as Lyndale Avenue, however. This route also ran through the south metro cities of Lakeville, Burnsville, Bloomington, Richfield and along the east shoreline of Wood Lake before continuing into Minneapolis. The modern portions of Lyndale Avenue is designated as County Road 22 (in Minneapolis) and Minnesota State Highway 21 (in Faribault). Prior to the portion south of Minneapolis being upgraded to a freeway, it was also part of Minnesota State Highway 65. In addition, there is a brief location north of Interstate 35W where a short highway is signed as Minnesota State Highway 121, which follows the old US 65 route into south Minneapolis.

Lyndale Avenue takes its name from Lyndale Farm, a 1,400-acre (570 ha) farm owned by William S. King. The name of the farm was in honor of King's father, Rev. Lyndon King, an itinerant Methodist minister of northern New York, who was named for Josiah Lyndon, colonial governor of Rhode Island in 1768-1769.

== Safety ==
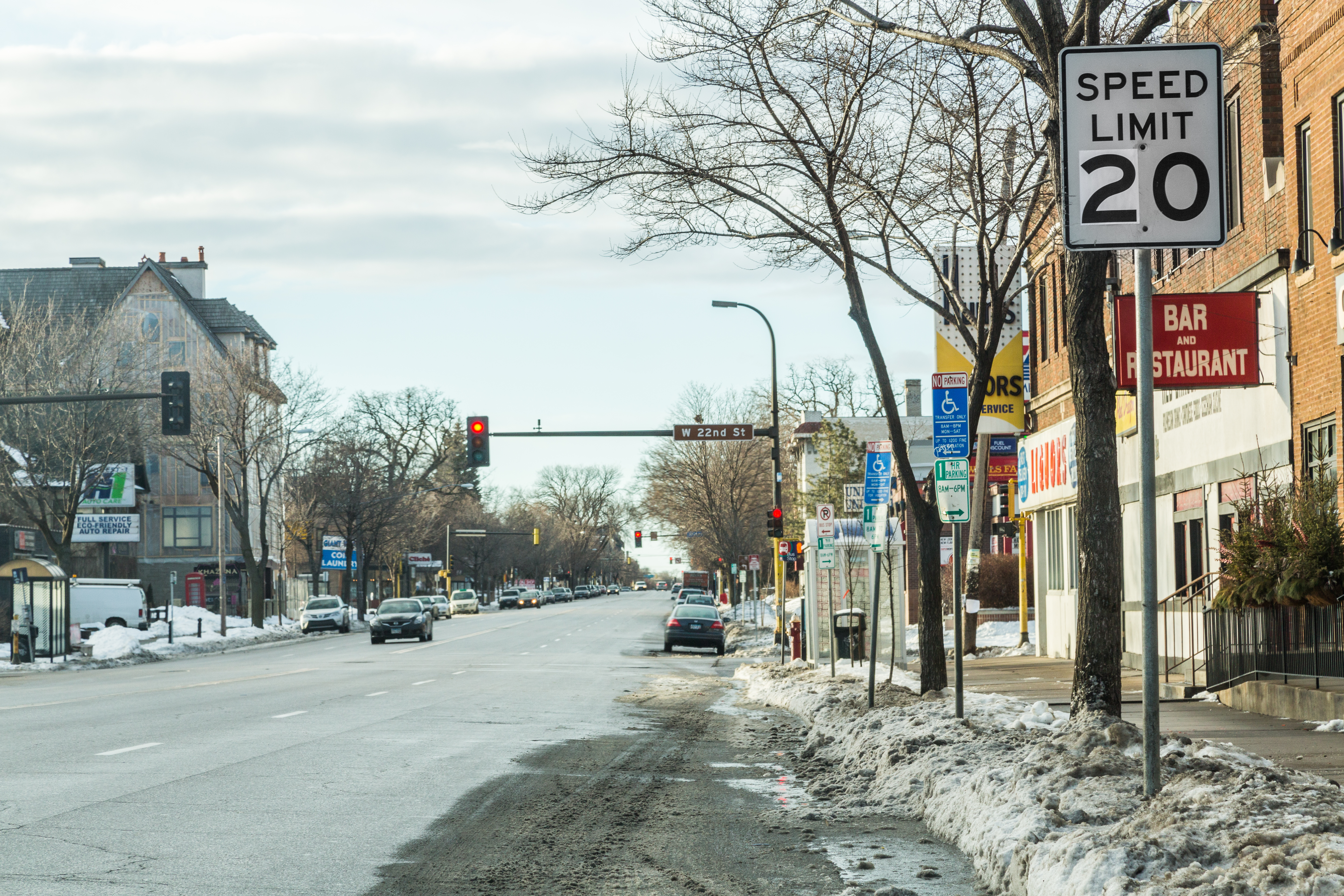
Lyndale Ave looking south just south of Franklin Ave. Guerrilla urbanists vandalized a street sign to reduce the posted speed limit in 2016.

The portion of Lyndale Ave between Franklin Ave and Lake Street is known for a high rate of crashes and injuries. The street segment was identified as part of the "High Injury Network" by the city of Minneapolis. The intersection of Lyndale Ave and Lake Street is particularly dangerous with the highest number of pedestrian crashes in Minneapolis over a ten year period. A large portion of the crashes happen at night.

A pilot project in 2022 used a road diet to change the road from 2 lanes in each direction to 1 lane in each direction and a center turn lane. The pilot saw crashes reduced by 57%. Select intersections also saw safety improvements designed for pedestrians. Hennepin County is the roadway authority for the segment between Franklin Ave and Lake Street and plans to reconstruct the road in 2027.
