= Lake Harriet (Minnesota) =

Lake in southwest Minneapolis

- Bdé Umáŋ (Dakota)
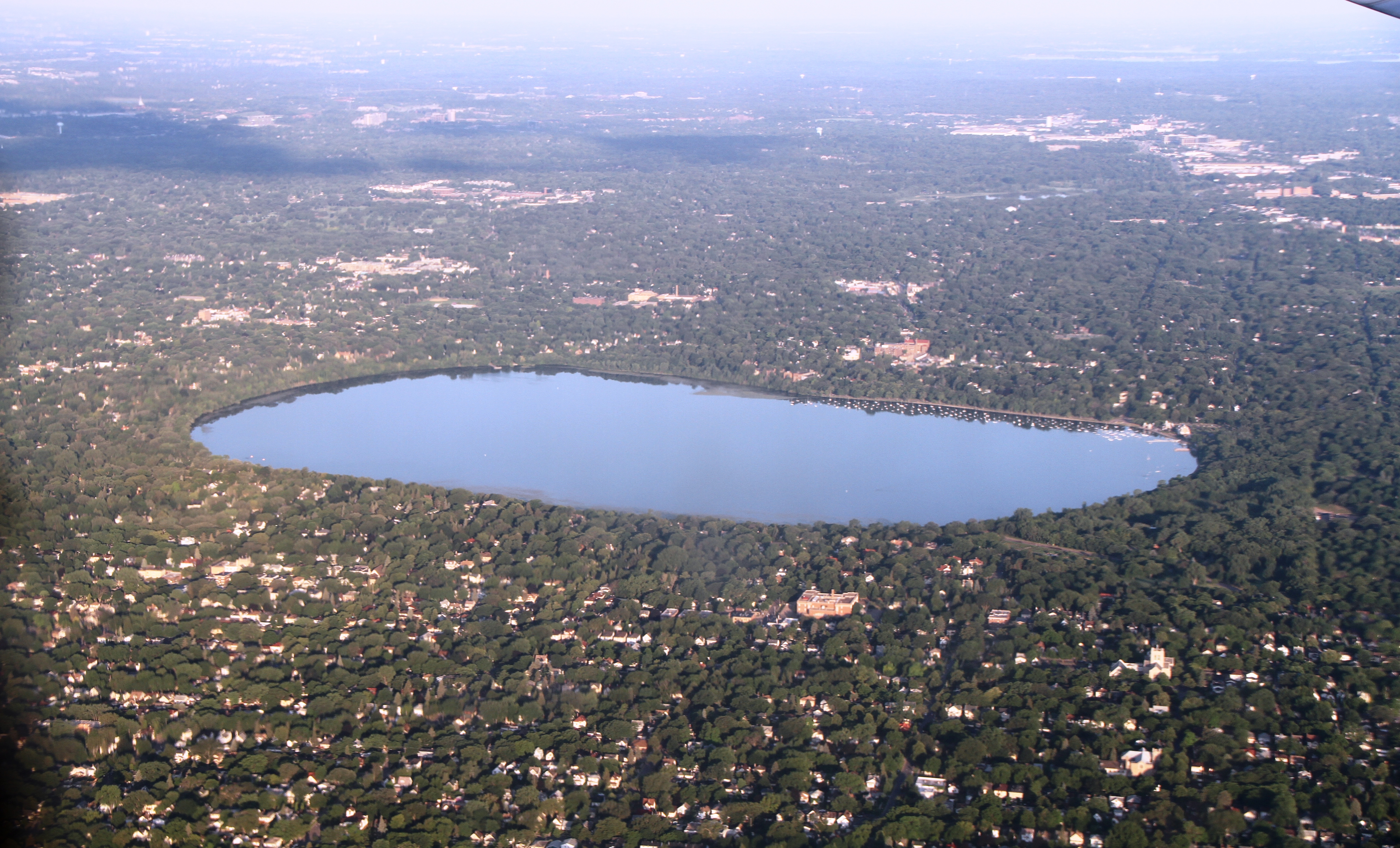
- Aerial view of Lake Harriet, 2012
- Interactive map of Lake Harriet
- Location: Minneapolis, Minnesota
- Coordinates: 44°55′17″N 93°18′19″W
- Basin countries: United States
- Surface area: 335 acres (1.36 km^{2})
- Max. depth: 85 feet (26 m)

Lake Harriet is a lake in southwest Minneapolis, south of Bde Maka Ska and north of Minnehaha Creek. The lake is surrounded by parkland as part of Minneapolis’ Chain of Lakes. The lake has an area of 335 acres (1.36 km^{2}) and a maximum depth of 85 feet (26 m).

== History ==
The lake is historically known as Bdé Umáŋ (the other lake) to the Dakota people, the original inhabitants of the area.

Lake Harriet is named for Harriet Lovejoy, who lived with her husband Colonel Henry Leavenworth at Fort Snelling (then Fort St. Anthony). The two came to the area in 1819. The lake and surrounding land was last owned by Colonel William S. King, who donated the land to the Minneapolis Park and Recreation Board in 1885.

=== The bandshell ===
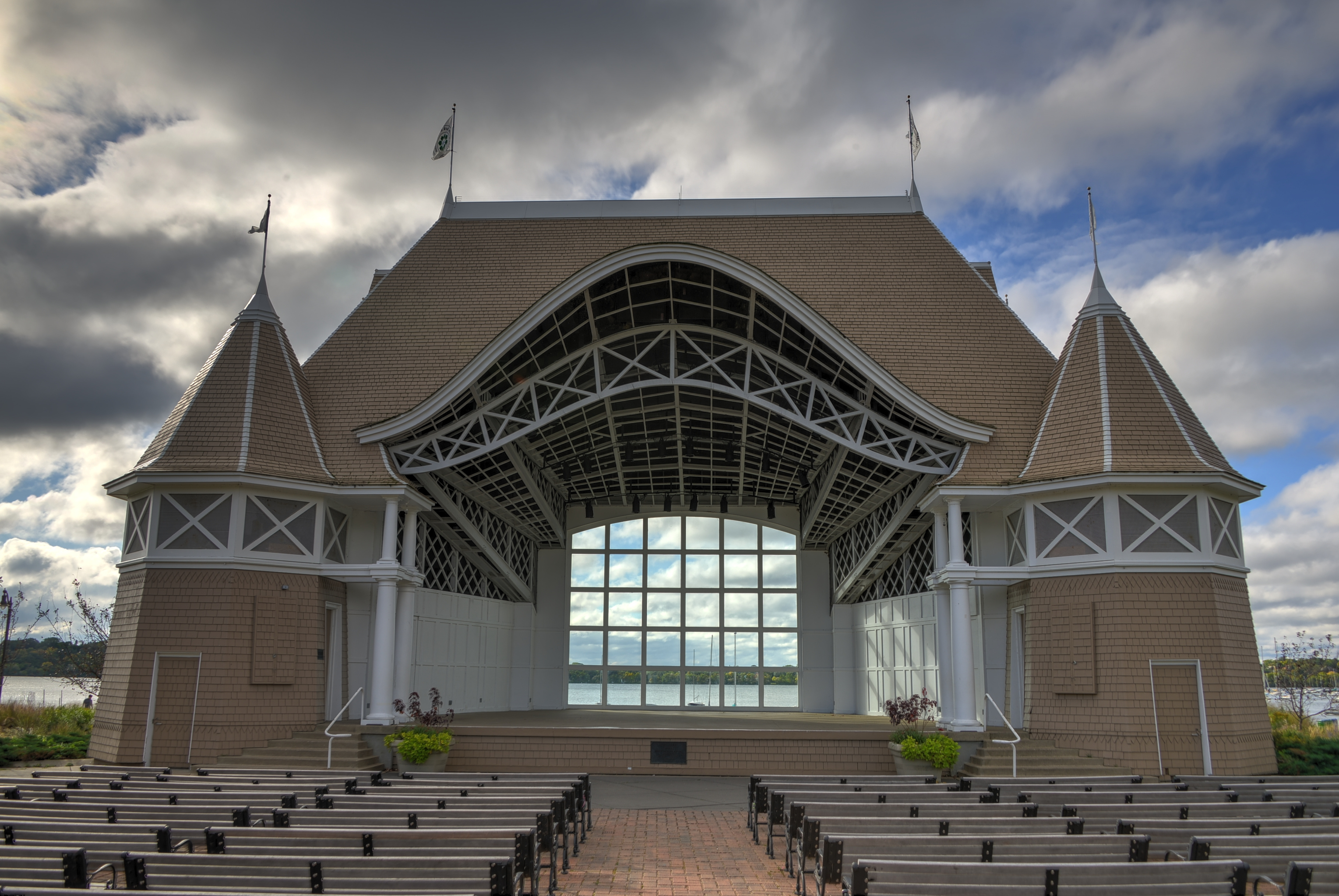
Bandshell at Lake Harriet

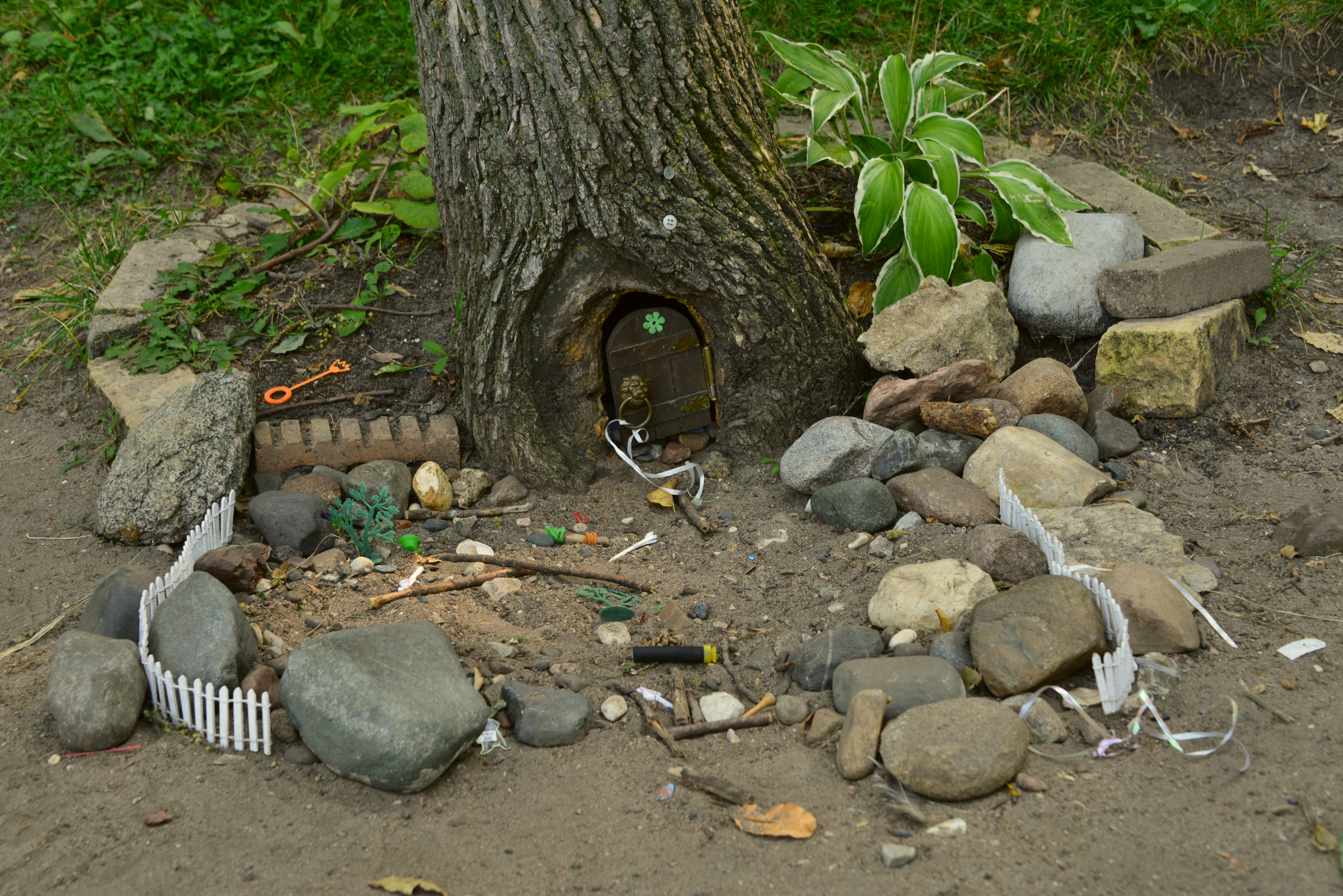
Lake Harriet's "elf house"

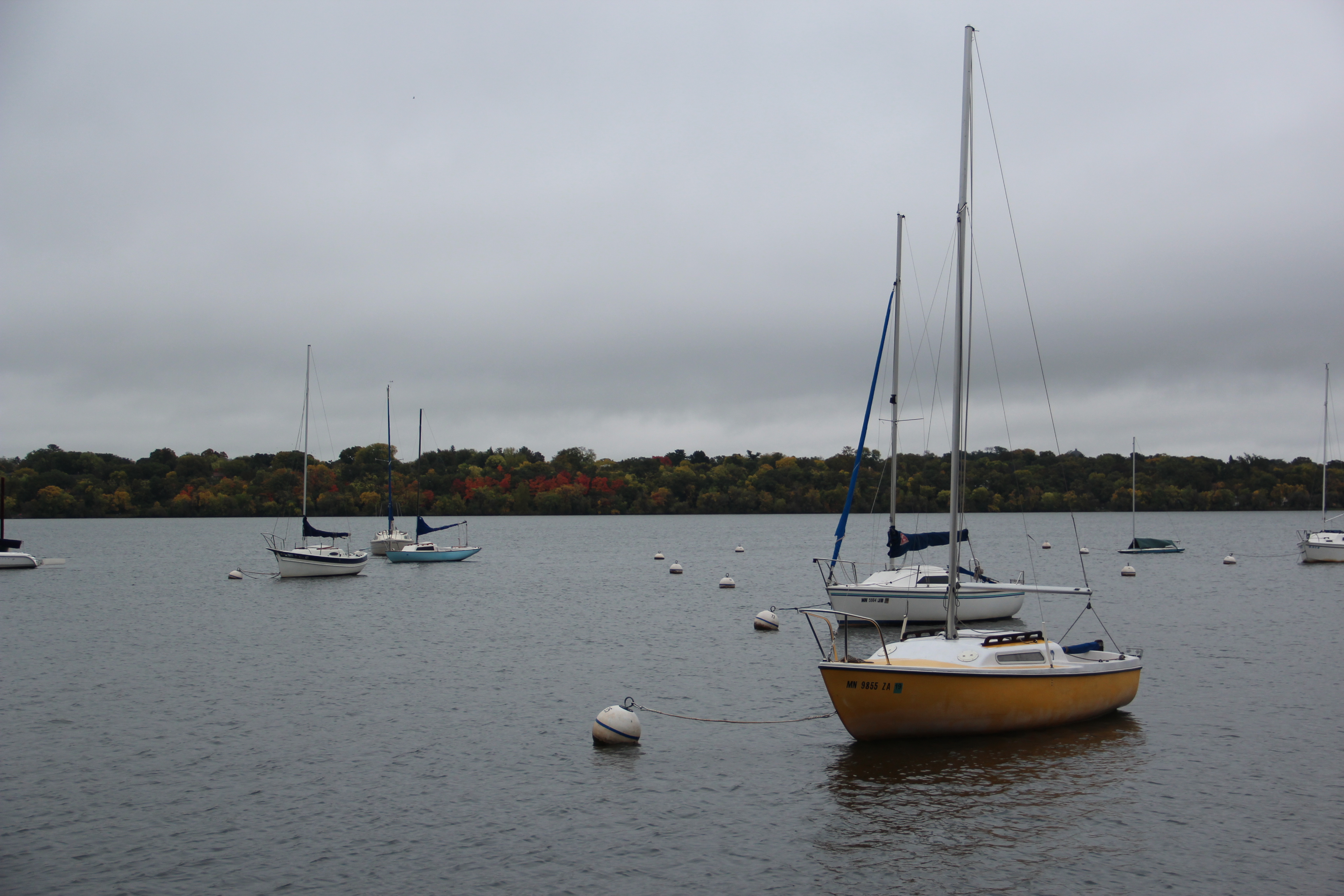
Sailboats on Lake Harriet

A public pavilion has been located on the northern side of Lake Harriet since 1888 when a pavilion was erected on the property of Thomas Lowry. It stood on the edge of Lake Harriet until 1891, when it was destroyed by fire. After the fire, Minneapolis hired architect Harry Wild Jones to design the next bandshell. Designed in a pagoda-like style, the second pavilion overlooked the lake until 1903 when it too was destroyed by fire. A third pavilion, in the classical revival style, again designed by Jones, was built in 1904. It was destroyed on July 8, 1925, in a windstorm; two people were killed, among a group which had taken refuge inside it. After the loss of this pavilion, a small bandstand was built on the site as a temporary replacement. The bandstand remained until it was replaced by the current bandshell structure, built in 1986 designed by Milo Thompson.

The current bandshell was originally painted blue, but in 2004 developer Mark McGowan organized an all-volunteer free restoration of the buildings. To complete the restoration, McGowan obtained $650,000 in donated labor and materials from local and national companies. Through these efforts, the bandshell, refectory and sailing club have been repaired and repainted light brown. To celebrate the restoration, an all-day music festival, called "Lake Harriet Live!", was held on September 19, 2003.

During the fall of 2006, construction of a new patio and picnic shelter built to match the design of the original buildings was begun next to the concessions. Construction of the new building and picnic area have been completed.

A renovation of the bandshell took place beginning in 2023, which included envelope and roof repair and replacement, along with accessibility improvements to the refectory facilities and restrooms. As part of the renovation, the bandshell and refectory were restored to a blue color approximating the original design intent. Continuing renovations to additional adjacent facilities will be completed by 2025. Along with the original 1986 bandshell, the renovation was designed by local architecture firm Bentz/Thompson/Rietow.

== Recreational facilities ==
Lake Harriet is popular for recreation. It offers sailing, two beaches, and a system of bike and pedestrian trails (about 2.99 miles (4.81 km) for the bike trail and 2.75 miles (4.43 km) for the pedestrian trail). The trail and parkway system, part of the Grand Rounds National Scenic Byway, connects with Bde Maka Ska on the north end of Lake Harriet, via William Berry Parkway, and with the Minnehaha Creek trail system at the southeast side of the lake.

The bandshell is used for concerts throughout the summer months. The bandshell complex also contains a picnic area and a seasonal outdoor restaurant, Bread & Pickle.

A preserved section of the Como-Harriet Streetcar Line runs between Bde Maka Ska and the Lake Harriet bandshell area.

== Other features ==
On the walking path near where Queen Avenue meets the perimeter drive around the lake, there is an "elf house" carved into the base of an ash tree. For several years, one could leave a letter for the elf supposedly living there and find a letter in reply sometime in the next few days. During the winter, the elf door is shut, and a plank appears stating he has "moved to his castle in the east." It reopens in the spring.

Other parkland near the lake includes a picnic ground just north of the bandshell, Lyndale Park, and the Thomas Sadler Roberts Bird Sanctuary on the northeast side of the lake. Lakewood Cemetery is located between the southeast side of Bde Maka Ska and the north shoreline of Lake Harriet.

Two blocks west of the lake is the shopping district of Linden Hills, often referred to as "a small town in the city".

During the months of January and February, the Art Shanty Projects installs a temporary artist-designed village on the ice of Lake Harriet.

It was discovered on Google Earth that the silhouette of a twin-engine aircraft can be seen in the water. Most have dismissed this as the shadow of a plane flying over, but an investigation was opened into the matter. Further information has determined that there is no sunken plane but rather it is a photographic anomaly of a plane passing over that, due to the exposure, makes it appear to be under the water.

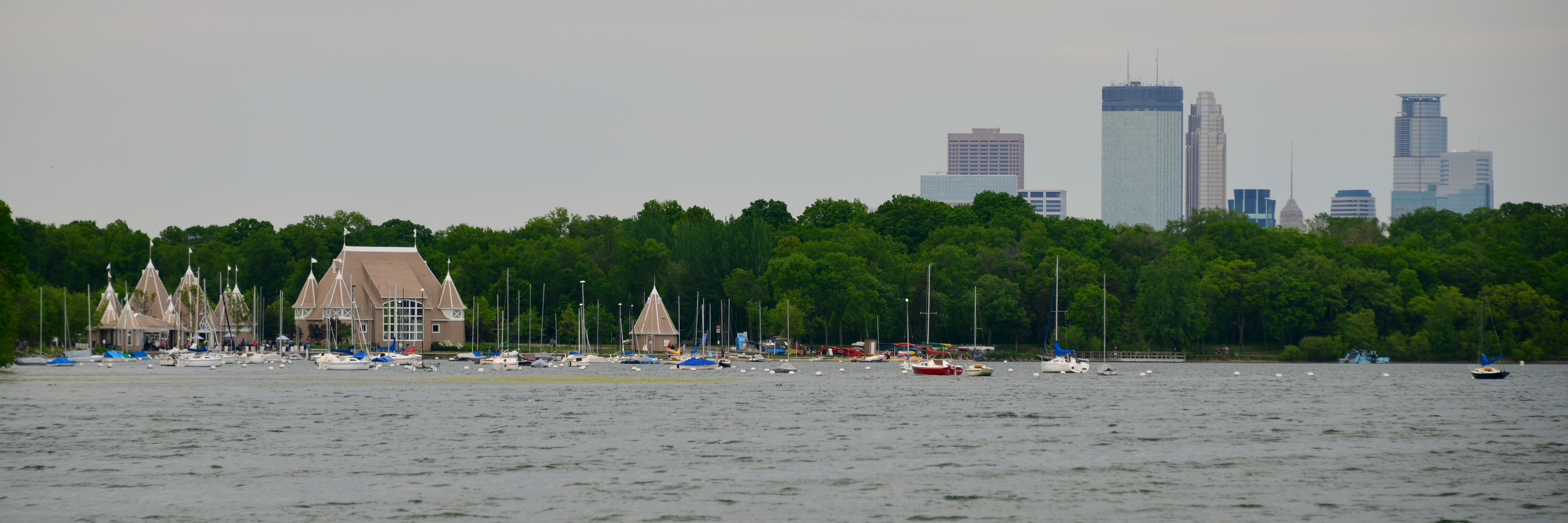
Lake Harriet pavilion complex, sailboats on the lake, and Minneapolis skyline

== Fish ==
The lake contains black crappie, bluegill, golden shiner, green sunfish, hybrid sunfish, largemouth bass, muskellunge, northern pike, pumpkinseed, walleye, white sucker, yellow bullhead, and yellow perch. Some guideline restrictions have been placed on the consumption of bluegill, carp, crappie, largemouth bass, northern pike, walleye, white sucker, and yellow perch from the lake, because of contamination with mercury and PFOS.

In 1998, a dead female lake sturgeon weighing 105 pounds (48 kg) and 6.3 feet (1.9 m) long washed ashore on the lake. Sturgeon were thought to no longer exist in the lake or the Minnehaha Creek watershed. Minnesota Department of Natural Resources officials speculated it may have been released into the lake when young by a fisheries employee during the mid-20th century. It is also possible the fish was a descendant of sturgeon which migrated into the lake thousands of years ago, prior to the formation of Minnehaha Falls.

== See also ==
- List of lakes in Minneapolis
- List of shared-use paths in Minneapolis
