= Minnehaha Creek =

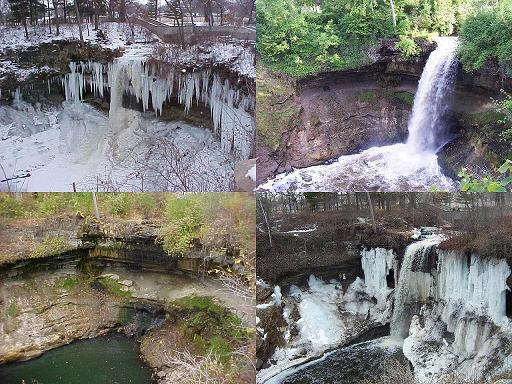
- Minnehaha Creek as it flows over Minnehaha Falls, shown in all four seasons.
- Etymology: waterfall or rapid water, for its journey over Minnehaha Falls
- Native name: Mniȟáȟa Wakpádaŋ (Dakota); Wakpa Cistinna

Location
- Country: United States
- State: Minnesota
- Region: Minneapolis, Edina, Hopkins, and Minnetonka

Physical characteristics
- Source
  - location: Lake Minnetonka
  - coordinates: 44.9544078°N 93.4860652°W
  - elevation: 686 feet (209 m)
- Mouth
  - location: Mississippi River
  - coordinates: 44.9088543°N 93.2004996°W
- Length: 22 mi (35 km)
- Basin size: 181 mi^{2} (470 km^{2})

Basin features
- River system: Mississippi River at Minneapolis
- Tributaries
  - right: brief stream originating at Lake Pamela
- GNIS: 647923

Minnehaha Creek (Dakota: Mniȟáȟa Wakpádaŋ) is a 22-mile-long (35-kilometer) tributary of the Mississippi River that flows east from Grays Bay Dam on Lake Minnetonka through the suburban cities of Minnetonka, Hopkins, Saint Louis Park, and Edina, and the city of Minneapolis. The creek flows over Minnehaha Falls in Minnehaha Park near its mouth at the Mississippi River.

== History ==
As with much of the Midwest, the area around the creek and Lake Minnetonka was originally inhabited by a native culture affiliated with the Mound Builders, but by the 1700s was occupied by the Mdewakanton People, a sub-tribe of the Dakota. The first Euro-Americans whose expedition to the area was documented were Joe Brown and Will Snelling, who canoed up the creek from Fort Snelling.

A man-made lake existed along the creek, called Richfield Mill Pond, a good fishing area, until it was destroyed to make way for housing in 1892.

== Watershed ==
The creek's watershed covers 181 square miles (470 km^{2}), including the basin of Lake Minnetonka, and is managed by the Minnehaha Creek Watershed District.

== See also ==
- List of rivers of Minnesota
- Nine Mile Creek (Minnesota River tributary)
- Bassett Creek (Mississippi River tributary)
