= Linea Palmisano =

American businesswoman, executive, and politician

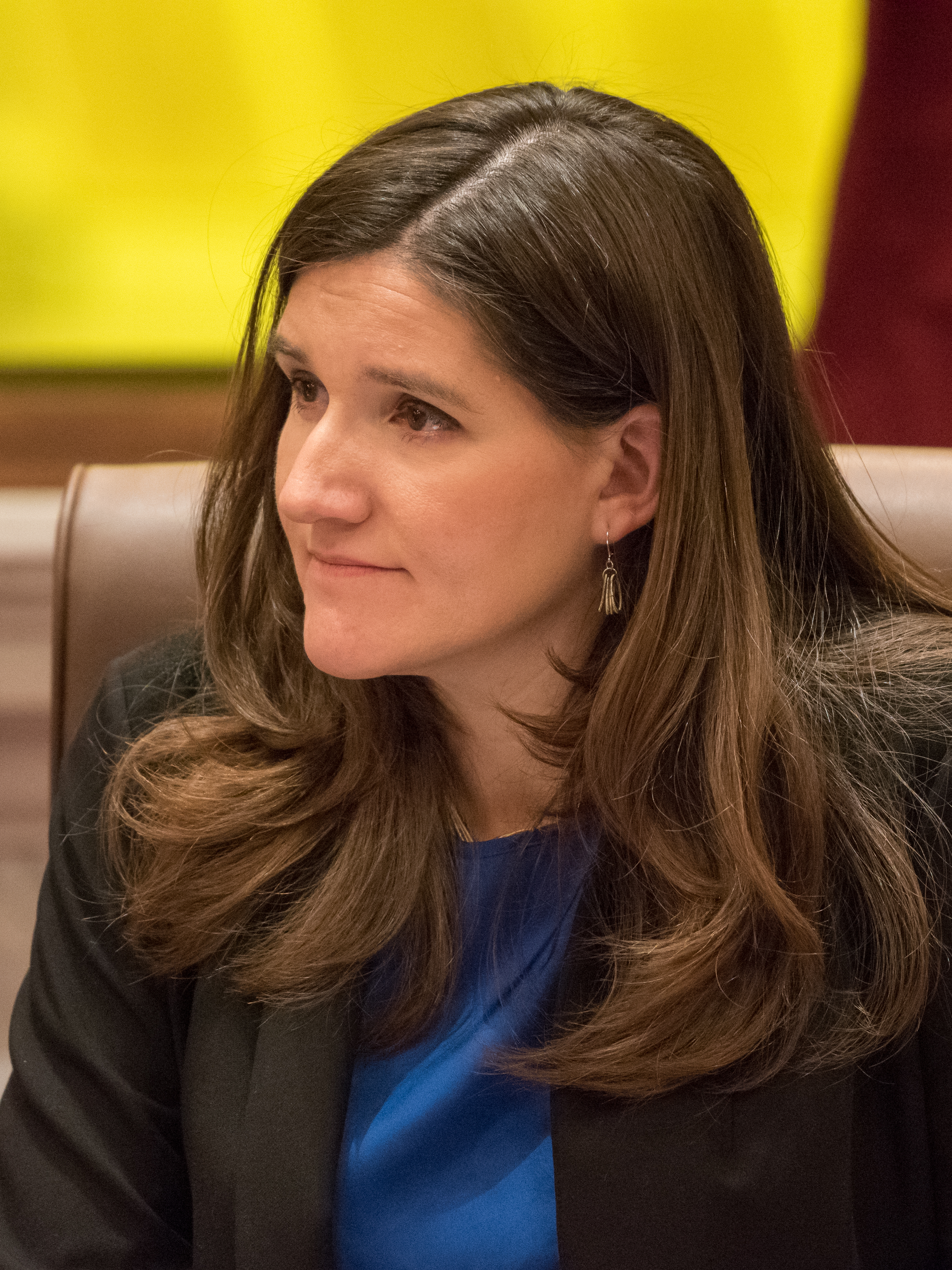
- Palmisano in 2018

Vice President of the Minneapolis City Council
- In office January 10, 2022 – January 8, 2024
- President: Andrea Jenkins
- Preceded by: Andrea Jenkins
- Succeeded by: Aisha Chughtai

Member of the Minneapolis City Council from the 13th ward
- Incumbent
- Assumed office January 2014
- Preceded by: Betsy Hodges

Personal details
- Born: 1976 (age 49–50) Minnesota
- Party: Minnesota Democratic–Farmer–Labor Party
- Children: 2
- Education: University of Notre Dame (BS); University of Minnesota (MBA)

Linea Palmisano is an American businesswoman, non-profit executive, and politician serving as a member of the Minneapolis City Council for the 13th ward.

== Education ==
Palmisano earned a Bachelor of Science degree from the University of Notre Dame and a Master of Business Administration from the University of Minnesota, where she specialized in strategy and entrepreneurship.

== Career ==
Palmisano has worked as the board chair of the Linden Hills Neighborhood Council and founder of the NAVIGATE immigrant college access program. She has worked as a track coach at Southwest High School. She also served as an intermediary between neighborhood association and the office of Mayor Betsy Hodges. Palmisano was elected to the Minneapolis City Council in November 2013 and took office on January 2, 2014, succeeding Hodges. While city council seats are officially nonpartisan, Palmisano is affiliated with the Minnesota Democratic–Farmer–Labor Party.

After the murder of George Floyd and resulting protests, Palmisano was one of three council members who did not sign a formal pledge to defund the police department. In a letter, Palmisano announced her support for a human rights lawsuit against the Minneapolis Police Department and advocated for "transformative change" of the department and its practices.

On January 10, 2022, Palmisano was elected as Vice-President of the Minneapolis City Council in an 8-5 vote. She served in the role until January 2024. She is the sitting vice-chair of the Administration & Enterprise Oversight Committee and a member of the Public Health & Safety Committee.

== Personal life ==
Palmisano lives with her husband and two sons in Linden Hills, Minneapolis.

== See also ==
- George Floyd protests in Minneapolis–Saint Paul
- 2021 Minneapolis Question 2
