= 2025 Minneapolis City Council election =

- November 4, 2025

All 13 seats on the Minneapolis City Council 7 seats needed for a majority
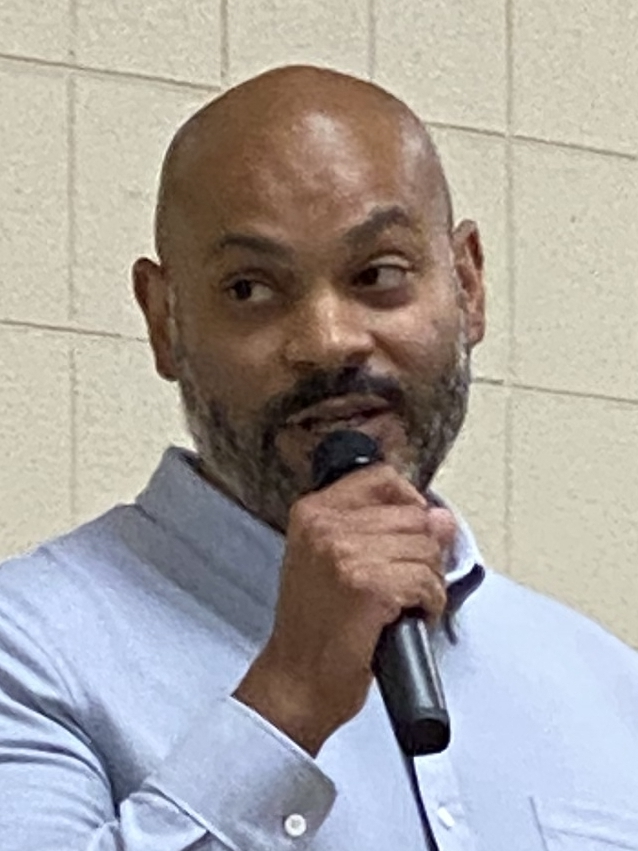

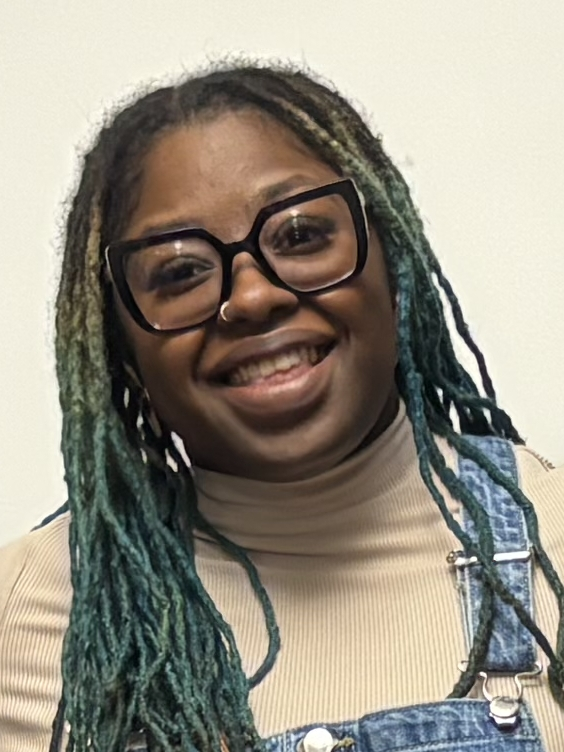
	Majority party	Minority party
Leader	Elliott Payne	Robin Wonsley
Party	Democratic (DFL)	Democratic Socialists (DSA)
Leader's seat	Ward 1	Ward 2
Last election	12	1
Seats won	12	1
Seat change	Steady	Steady
Popular vote	125,479	3,825
Percentage	90.02%	2.74%
Swing	▲0.72 pp	▲0.30 pp
President before election
Elliott Payne
Democratic (DFL)
Elected President
TBD

The 2025 Minneapolis City Council election occurred in the city of Minneapolis, Minnesota, United States on November 4, 2025. The Minneapolis City Council is made up of 13 members representing different parts of the city. Members elected in 2025 will serve four-year terms. Council members were elected alongside elections for mayor and other municipal offices.

== Background ==
This was the first Minneapolis City Council election since 2017 in which members are elected to the usual 4-year terms, rather than 2-year terms. In 2020, voters passed a ballot measure to elect council members to two separate, two-year terms in 2021 and 2023. This measure was meant to keep city council and mayoral terms concurrent.

The 2023 election saw a progressive-leaning and democratic socialist majority elected to the council. Prior to 2023, more moderate members held the majority. The progressive faction includes council members Payne, Chavez, Wonsley, Chughtai, Chowdhury, Ellison, and Cashman. In the 2023 election, Wonsley, Chughtai, Chowdhury, and Chavez were endorsed by the Twin Cities chapter of the Democratic Socialists of America, but Chowdhury was not endorsed in 2025. The moderate faction includes council members Jenkins, Rainville, Vetaw, Palmisano, and (formerly) Koski. The two largest PACs in both the 2023 and 2025 city council races are All of Mpls and Mpls for the Many. Generally, All of Mpls endorses more moderate candidates and Mpls for the Many endorses more progressive candidates. Councilmember Jamal Osman was not endorsed by either PAC in 2023 but has voted more often with the progressives. Emily Koski was the council's most reliable swing vote, supporting the moderates and progressives evenly. Koski is retiring from the council. She launched a campaign for mayor, but withdrew in April.

In December 2024, the mayor’s 2025 city budget was approved by the council with a record 71 amendments. Mayor Jacob Frey, associated with the moderate faction, vetoed that amended budget (the first veto of its kind in city history) citing concerns about fiscal irresponsibility and higher property taxes. In turn, the council overrode the veto with a supermajority vote of 9–4, officially enacting its version of the budget. The amended budget included a $1.9 billion allocation with a 6.8% tax levy increase, diverging from Mayor Frey’s initial plan, which had an 8.1% property tax levy cap (later adjusted to 8.3%).

Issues expected to significantly influence the election included the city's handling of homeless encampments, which drew criticism over effectiveness and oversight; rising concerns about public safety and policing strategies amid recent incidents of violence and strained relationships between law enforcement leadership and city politics; and tensions surrounding interactions with the federal government.

=== Electoral system ===
The 13 members of the city council are elected from single-member districts via instant-runoff voting, commonly known as ranked choice voting. Voters have the option of ranking up to three candidates in order of preference. Municipal elections in Minnesota are officially nonpartisan, although candidates are able to identify with a political party or principle on the ballot. Write-in candidates must file a request with the Minneapolis Elections & Voter Services Division for votes for them to be counted.

=== Retiring members ===
- Jeremiah Ellison (DFL), Ward 5
- Andrea Jenkins (DFL), Ward 8
- Emily Koski (DFL), Ward 11

== Summary of results ==
Party	Candidates	1st Choice Votes			Max Round		Seats		
Party	Candidates	No.	%	∆pp	No.	%	No.	∆No.	%
Democratic–Farmer–Labor Party (DFL)	30	125,479	90.02	+0.72	118,622	89.51	12	0	92.31
Democratic Socialists of America	1	3,825	2.74	+0.78	3,825	2.89	1	0	7.69
Progressive Unity Independent	1	3,307	2.37	+2.37	3,307	2.50	0	0	0.00
Independent	2	1,932	1.39	-1.85	1,932	1.46	0	0	0.00
Budgetary Economic Stability	1	1,136	0.81	+0.81	1,136	0.86	0	0	0.00
Community Over Politics	1	904	0.65	+0.65	904	0.68	0	0	0.00
Socialist Workers Party	1	661	0.47	-0.53	661	0.50	0	0	0.00
Climate Revolution Elephant	1	630	0.45	+0.45	630	0.47	0	0	0.00
Tell The Truth	1	443	0.32	+0.32	443	0.33	0	0	0.00
Republican Party	1	416	0.30	-0.93	416	0.31	0	0	0.00
N/A	1	1	0.00	+0.00	1	0.00	0	0	0.00
Write-in	N/A	663	0.48	-1.3	643	0.49	0	0	0.00
Total		139,397	100	±0.00	132,520	100			

First choice vote
Democratic–Farmer–Labor	90.02%
Democratic Socialists	2.74%
Progressive Unity Independent	2.37%
Independent	1.39%
Budgetary Economic Stability	0.81%
Community Over Politics	0.65%
Socialist Workers	0.47%
Climate Revolution Elephant	0.45%
Tell The Truth	0.32%
Republican	0.30%
N/A	0.00%
Write-in	0.48%

Seats
Democratic–Farmer–Labor	92.31%
Democratic Socialists	7.69%

== Ward 1 ==
Ward 1 is based in northeast Minneapolis, stretching from the neighborhoods of Waite Park and Columbia Park down to Como. The incumbent is Democrat and council president Elliott Payne, who was elected with 90% of the vote in 2023. He won re-election with 65% of the vote.

=== Candidates ===
- Edwin Fruit (Socialist Workers Party), candidate for this ward in 2023
- Elliott Payne (DFL), incumbent, City Council president
- Brian Strahan (DFL)

=== Endorsements ===
Elliott Payne

U.S. representatives

- Ilhan Omar, U.S. representative for Minnesota's 5th congressional district

Labor unions

- UNITE HERE Local 17
- SEIU Minnesota
- Minneapolis Regional Labor Federation, AFL-CIO

Organizations

- Minnesota Young DFL
- Mpls for the Many
- TakeAction Minnesota
- OutFront Minnesota

Political parties

- Minneapolis DFL
- Working Families Party
Brian Strahan

Organizations

- All of Mpls
- We Love Minneapolis

=== Results ===
Results by precinct: Payne: 60–70%; 70–80%

Ward 1 results
Party	Candidate	Round 1	
Party	Candidate	Votes	%
Democratic (DFL)	Elliott Payne (incumbent)	7,876	64.89%
Democratic (DFL)	Brian Strahan	3,565	29.37%
Socialist Workers	Edwin Fruit	661	5.45%
Write-in	Write-ins	36	0.30%
Total active votes		12,138	100.0%
Source: Minneapolis Elections & Voter Services

== Ward 2 ==
Ward 2 contains the neighborhoods of Cooper, Prospect Park, and University District, as well as portions of Seward and Cedar-Riverside. The incumbent is independent democratic socialist (Note: Wonsley has used "Democratic Socialist" as the "political party or principle" on her ballot line. The Democratic Socialists of America is not a political party and Wonsley herself is an independent.) Robin Wonsley, who was re-elected with 67.63% of the vote in the first round 2023.

Ward 2 is the only seat on the council not held by the DFL. The party's convention on 3 May 2025 adjourned without endorsing a candidate. Former state representative Shelley Madore led with 53 percent of delegate votes, but short of the 60% required. Wonsley, who did not seek party backing, saw supporters’ ballots ruled invalid. Wonsely celebrated the convention outcome. She won reelection with 60% of the vote.

=== Candidates ===
==== Filed ====
- Shelley Madore (DFL), former state representative
- Max Theroux (DFL)
- Robin Wonsley (Democratic Socialist), incumbent

==== Withdrawn ====
- Michael Baskins (DFL), write-in candidate for this ward in 2023
- Alexander Fooy (DFL) (endorsed Wonsley)

=== Endorsements ===
Robin Wonsley

Federal officials

- Ilhan Omar, MN-05 (2019–present)

Labor unions

- UNITE HERE Local 17
- SEIU Minnesota
- Minneapolis Regional Labor Federation, AFL-CIO
- GLU-UE Local 1105

Organizations

- Sierra Club Minnesota
- Twin Cities Democratic Socialists of America
- Mpls for the Many
- TakeAction Minnesota
- OutFront Minnesota
Michael Baskins

Organizations

- ~~All of Mpls~~ (withdrawn)
- We Love Minneapolis (co-endorsement with Madore)
Shelley Madore

Organizations

- All of Mpls
- We Love Minneapolis (co-endorsement with Baskins)
Declined to endorse

Political parties

- Minneapolis DFL

=== Results ===
Results by precinct: Wonsley: 40–50%; 50–60%; 60–70%; 70–80%; Madore: 50–60%

Ward 2 results
Party	Candidate	Round 1	
Party	Candidate	Votes	%
Democratic Socialist	Robin Wonsley (incumbent)	3,825	59.80%
Democratic (DFL)	Shelley Madore	2,069	32.35%
Democratic (DFL)	Max Theroux	252	3.94%
Democratic (DFL)	Michael Baskins (withdrawn)	236	3.69%
Write-in	Write-ins	14	0.22%
Total active votes		6,396	100.0%
Source: Minneapolis Elections & Voter Services

== Ward 3 ==
Ward 3 contains the neighborhoods of Beltrami, Como, Downtown East, Downtown West, Marcy Holmes, Nicollet Island - East Bank, North Loop, Sheridan, St. Anthony East and St. Anthony West. The incumbent is Democrat Michael Rainville, who won 69.45% of the vote in the first round in his 2023 re-election. He won reelection with 74% of the vote.

=== Candidates ===
==== Filed ====
- Michael Rainville (DFL), incumbent
- Marcus Mills (Progressive Unity Independent), candidate for this ward in 2023

==== Withdrawn ====
- Emilio Rodríguez (DFL), candidate for Senate District 60 in the 2025 special election
- Jacob Thomas (DFL)

=== Endorsements ===
Michael Rainville

Political parties

- Minneapolis DFL

Organizations

- All of Mpls
Emilio Rodriguez

Organizations

- Minnesota Young DFL

=== Results ===
Results by precinct: Rainville: 50–60%; 60–70%; 70–80%; 80–90%

Ward 3 results
Party	Candidate	Round 1	
Party	Candidate	Votes	%
Democratic (DFL)	Michael Rainville (incumbent)	9,505	73.86%
Progressive Unity Independent	Marcus Mills	3,307	25.70%
n/a	Valerie Bartel	1	0.01%
Write-in	Write-ins	56	0.43%
Total active votes		12,869	100.0%
Source: Minneapolis Elections & Voter Services

== Ward 4 ==
Ward 4 is in the northwest corner of the city. It contains the neighborhoods of Camden Industrial Area, Cleveland, Folwell, Humboldt Industrial Area, Jordan, Lind-Bohanon, McKinley, Shingle Creek, Victory, Webber-Camden and Willard-Hay. The incumbent is Democrat LaTrisha Vetaw, who was re-elected with 69.36% of the vote in the first round in 2023. She won reelection with 61% of the vote.

=== Candidates ===
==== Filed ====
- Leslie Davis (Tell The Truth), perennial candidate
- Marvina Haynes (DFL), candidate for this ward in 2023
- Latrisha Vetaw (DFL), incumbent

=== Endorsements ===
Marvina Haynes

Organizations

- OutFront Minnesota
Latrisha Vetaw

Political parties

- Minneapolis DFL

Organizations

- All of Mpls

=== Results ===
Results by precinct: Vetaw: 50–60%; 60–70%; 70–80%

Ward 4 results
Party	Candidate	Round 1	
Party	Candidate	Votes	%
Democratic (DFL)	Latrisha Vetaw (incumbent)	4,039	60.89%
Democratic (DFL)	Marvina Haynes	2,123	32.01%
Tell The Truth	Leslie Davis	443	6.68%
Write-in	Write-ins	28	0.42%
Total active votes		6,633	100.0%
Source: Minneapolis Elections & Voter Services

== Ward 5 ==
Ward 5 contains the neighborhoods of Harrison, Near North, Hawthorne, and North Loop. The incumbent is Democrat Jeremiah Ellison, who was re-elected in Round 1 with 52.54% of the vote in 2023. Ellison is not seeking re-election. Pearll Warren won election after the third round of ranked choice voting with 48% of the vote.

=== Candidates ===
==== Filed ====
- Ethrophic Burnett (DFL)
- Pearll Warren (DFL)
- Maurice L Ward (DFL)
- Miles Wilson (DFL)
- Anndrea Young (DFL)
- Jōvan Northington (DFL)

==== Withdrawn ====
- Amber Frederick (DFL) (running for Park Board at-large)

=== Endorsements ===
Ethrophic Burnett

Organizations

- Mpls for the Many
- OutFront Minnesota
Pearll Warren

Organizations

- All of Mpls (co-endorsement with Wilson)
Miles Wilson

Organizations

- All of Mpls (co-endorsement with Warren)
Declined to endorse

Political parties

- Minneapolis DFL

=== Results ===
Results by precinct: Warren: 30–40%; 40–50%; Burnett: 40–50%

Ward 5 results
Party	Candidate	Round 1		Round 2		Round 3	
Party	Candidate	Votes	%	Votes	%	Votes	%
Democratic (DFL)	Pearll Warren	1,891	37.54%	1,954	38.79%	2,437	48.38%
Democratic (DFL)	Ethrophic Burnett	1,419	28.17%	1,453	28.85%	1,723	34.21%
Democratic (DFL)	Miles G. Wilson	725	14.39%	790	15.68%	Eliminated	
Democratic (DFL)	Anndrea Young	593	11.77%	656	13.02%	Eliminated	
Democratic (DFL)	Maurice L. Ward	293	5.82%	Eliminated		Eliminated	
Democratic (DFL)	Jōvan Northington	96	1.91%	Eliminated		Eliminated	
Write-in	Write-ins	20	0.40%	Eliminated		Eliminated	
Exhausted votes		0	0%	184	3.65%	877	17.41%
Total active votes						5,037	100.0%
Source: Minneapolis Elections & Voter Services

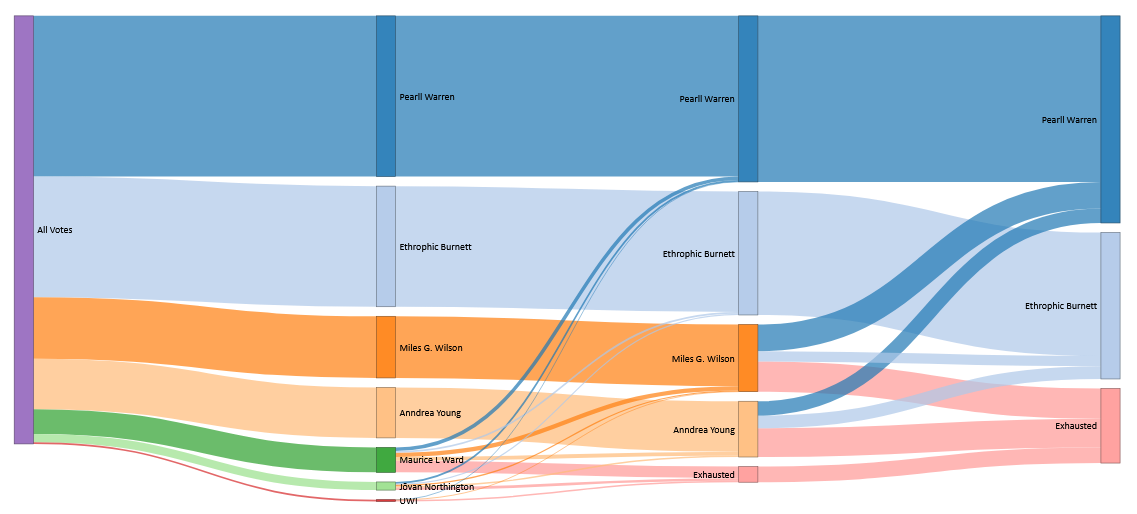
Alluvial diagram for vote distribution in Ward 5. "UWI" refers to undeclared write-ins on this diagram.

== Ward 6 ==
Ward 6 contains the neighborhoods of Philips West, and Ventura Village, as well as portions of Seward, Stevens Square-Loring Heights, Cedar-Riverside, and Elliot Park. The incumbent is Democrat Jamal Osman, who was re-elected in the second round of ranked-choice tabulation, receiving 44.73% of first-choice votes and 58.18% of final votes. He won reelection with 59% of the vote.

=== Candidates ===
==== Filed ====
- Mohamoud Hassan (DFL)
- Jamal Osman (DFL), incumbent

=== Endorsements ===
Jamal Osman

Political parties

- Minneapolis DFL

Federal officials

- Ilhan Omar, U.S. representative for Minnesota's 5th congressional district
Declined to endorse

Organizations

- All of Mpls

=== Results ===
Results by precinct: Osman: 50–60%; 60–70%; Hassan: 50–60%

Ward 6 results
Party	Candidate	Round 1	
Party	Candidate	Votes	%
Democratic (DFL)	Jamal Osman (incumbent)	4,164	58.78%
Democratic (DFL)	Mohamoud Hassan	2,837	40.05%
Write-in	Write-ins	83	1.17%
Total active votes		7,084	100.0%
Source: Minneapolis Elections & Voter Services

== Ward 7 ==
Ward 7 contains the neighborhoods of Bryn Mawr, Cedar-Isles-Dean, Downtown West, East Isles, Kenwood, Loring Park, and Lowry Hill, as well as portions of Stevens Square-Loring Heights and Elliot Park. The incumbent is Democrat Katie Cashman, who was first elected in the second round of ranked-choice tabulation in 2023, winning 48.41% of first-choice votes and 51.12% of final votes. Elizabeth Shaffer won with 52% of the vote.

=== Candidates ===
==== Filed ====
- Katie Cashman (DFL), incumbent
- Elizabeth Shaffer (DFL), Park Board commissioner
- Corey Ryan Vest (DFL)

==== Withdrawn ====
- Paula Chesley (DFL)
- Corey Ryan Vest (DFL)

=== Endorsements ===
Katie Cashman

Political parties

- Working Families Party

Federal officials

- Ilhan Omar, U.S. representative for Minnesota's 5th congressional district

Organizations

- LIUNA Minnesota & North Dakota
- Minneapolis Regional Labor Federation, AFL-CIO
- Minnesota Young DFL
- Mpls for the Many
- UNITE HERE Local 17
- SEIU Minnesota
- OutFront Minnesota
Elizabeth Shaffer

Political parties

- Minneapolis DFL

Organizations

- All of Mpls (co-endorsement with Chesley)
Paula Chesley (withdrawn)

Organizations

- All of Mpls (co-endorsement with Shaffer)

=== Results ===
Results by precinct: Shaffer: 50–60%; 60–70%; 80–90%; Cashman: 40–50%; 50–60%; 60–70%

Ward 7 results
Party	Candidate	Round 1	
Party	Candidate	Votes	%
Democratic (DFL)	Elizabeth Shaffer	6,709	52.14%
Democratic (DFL)	Katie Cashman (incumbent)	5,909	45.92%
Democratic (DFL)	Corey Ryan Vest	223	1.73%
Write-in	Write-ins	27	0.21%
Total active votes		12,868	100.0%
Source: Minneapolis Elections & Voter Services

== Ward 8 ==
Ward 8 contains the neighborhoods of Bancroft, Bryant, Central, Field, Kingfield, Lyndale, Northrop, and Regina. Incumbent Democrat Andrea Jenkins (DFL) is not seeking re-election.

Jenkins was re-elected in the second round of ranked-choice-voting in 2023 after receiving fewer first-choice votes than opponent Soren Stevenson (DFL). Jenkins won in 2023 with 43.32% of first-choice votes and 50.24% of final-round votes. Stevenson announced his bid for the ward in December 2024. He won with 56% of the vote.

=== Candidates ===
==== Filed ====
- Josh Bassais (DFL), union organizer
- Philip Galberth (independent)
- Soren Stevenson (DFL), candidate for this ward in 2023
- Bob Sullentrop (Republican) candidate for this ward in 2021 and Minnesota House of Representatives seat 62B in 2024

=== Endorsements ===
Soren Stevenson

Political parties

- Minneapolis DFL

Federal officials

- Ilhan Omar, U.S. representative for Minnesota's 5th congressional district

Organizations

- Twin Cities Democratic Socialists of America
- Mpls for the Many
- Minnesota Young DFL
- TakeAction Minnesota
- OutFront Minnesota
Josh Bassais

Political organizations

- All of Mpls

=== Results ===
Results by precinct: Stevenson: 50–60%; 60–70%; 70–80%; Bassais: 40–50%; 50–60%

Ward 8 results
Party	Candidate	Round 1	
Party	Candidate	Votes	%
Democratic (DFL)	Soren Stevenson	6,685	56.25%
Democratic (DFL)	Josh Bassais	4,594	38.66%
Republican	Bob Sullentrop	416	3.50%
Independent	Philip Galberth	178	1.50%
Write-in	Write-ins	11	0.09%
Total active votes		11,884	100.0%
Source: Minneapolis Elections & Voter Services

== Ward 9 ==
Ward 9 contains the neighborhoods of Corcoran, East Phillips, Longfellow, Midtown Phillips, and Powderhorn Park. The incumbent is Democrat Jason Chavez, who was re-elected in the first round of tabulation with 78.94% of the vote in 2023. He won reelection with 77% of the vote.

=== Candidates ===
==== Filed ====
- Jason Chavez (DFL), incumbent
- Dan Orban (independent), candidate for this ward in 2023

==== Withdrawn ====
- Marques Jones (DFL), MFD firefighter

=== Endorsements ===
Jason Chavez

Political parties

- Minneapolis DFL

Federal officials

- Ilhan Omar, U.S. representative for Minnesota's 5th congressional district

Organizations

- LGBTQ+ Victory Fund
- Minnesota Young DFL
- Twin Cities Democratic Socialists of America
- Mpls for the Many
- TakeAction Minnesota
- UNITE HERE Local 17
- SEIU Minnesota
- Minneapolis Regional Labor Federation, AFL-CIO
- OutFront Minnesota
Marques Jones (Withdrawn)

Organizations

- All of Mpls

=== Results ===
Results by precinct: Chavez: 70–80%; 80–90%

Ward 9 results
Party	Candidate	Round 1	
Party	Candidate	Votes	%
Democratic (DFL)	Jason Chavez (incumbent)	6,089	77.37%
Independent	Daniel Orban	1,754	22.29%
Write-in	Write-ins	27	0.34%
Total active votes		7,870	100.0%
Source: Minneapolis Elections & Voter Services

== Ward 10 ==
Ward 10 contains the neighborhoods of East Bde Maka Ska, Lowry Hill East, South Uptown, and Whittier, as well as a portion of East Harriet. The incumbent is Democrat and current council vice president Aisha Chughtai, who was re-elected in the first round with 60.74% of the vote in 2023.

Chughtai is challenged by Lydia Millard, Executive Director of the Stevens Square Community Organization and Target corporate employee. Prior to the ward convention, it was discovered that Millard was claiming a house in Ward 1 as her primary residence for tax purposes in 2024. Millard explained that the house was intended to house women who had recently been released from incarceration, but that this had become untenable due to water damage that had occurred in January 2024.

Millard was supported by We Love Minneapolis PAC. prior to its dissolving, which received thirty thousand dollars from Hornig Properties, a corporate landlord in Ward 10, during their first quarter of operation. Claims have been made that the Millard team received assistance door knocking on Hornig properties. Jim Rubin, owner of Mint Properties, another prominent Ward 10 landlord, has been identified as a leader of the PAC.

The ward saw no DFL endorsement when Chughtai earned 52 percent of the vote to Millard’s 47 percent and delegates unanimously voted to end the convention early rather than hold further votes. Chughtai alleged that she was assaulted during the convention by one of Millard's supporters.

Chughtai won reelection with 59% of the vote.

=== Candidates ===
==== Filed ====
- Aisha Chughtai (DFL), incumbent
- DeShanneon Grimes (DFL)
- Lydia Millard (DFL)

=== Endorsements ===
Aisha Chughtai

Federal officials

- Ilhan Omar, U.S. representative for Minnesota's 5th congressional district

Organizations

- Minnesota Young DFL
- Twin Cities Democratic Socialists of America
- MCAD Young Democratic Socialists of America
- TakeAction Minnesota
- UNITE HERE Local 17
- SEIU Minnesota
- Minneapolis Regional Labor Federation, AFL-CIO
- OutFront Minnesota
Lydia Millard

Organizations

- All of Mpls
- We Love Minneapolis
Declined to endorse

Political parties

- Minneapolis DFL

=== Results ===
Results by precinct: Chughtai: 50–60%; 60–70%; Millard: 50–60%

Ward 10 results
Party	Candidate	Round 1	
Party	Candidate	Votes	%
Democratic (DFL)	Aisha Chughtai (incumbent)	6,358	58.76%
Democratic (DFL)	Lydia Millard	4,011	37.07%
Democratic (DFL)	DeShanneon Grimes	423	3.91%
Write-in	Write-ins	28	0.26%
Total active votes		10,820	100.0%
Source: Minneapolis Elections & Voter Services

== Ward 11 ==
Ward 11 contains the neighborhoods of Diamond Lake, Hale, Page, Northrop, Tangletown, Wenonah, and Windom, as well as a portion of Keewaydin. The incumbent is Democrat Emily Koski, who was re-elected with 88.36% of the first-round vote in 2023. Koski did not seek re-election, instead focusing on a bid for mayor. Upon her withdrawal from the mayoral election in April 2025, Koski declined to enter the race for her council seat.

Jamison Whiting won with 63% of the vote.

=== Candidates ===
==== Filed ====
- Mariam DeMello (DFL), lawyer
- Jim Meyer (Budgetary Economic Stability)
- Jamison Whiting (DFL), police reform attorney

=== Endorsements ===
Jamison Whiting

Political parties

- Minneapolis DFL

Organizations

- Minnesota Young DFL
- All of Mpls (co-endorsement with DeMello)
- OutFront Minnesota
Mariam DeMello (withdrawn)

Organizations

- All of Mpls (co-endorsement with Whiting)

=== Results ===
Results by precinct: Whiting: 50–60%; 60–70%

Ward 11 results
Party	Candidate	Round 1	
Party	Candidate	Votes	%
Democratic (DFL)	Jamison Whiting	8,436	62.57%
Democratic (DFL)	Mariam DeMello	3,887	28.83%
Budgetary Economic Stability	Jim Meyer	1,136	8.43%
Write-in	Write-ins	24	0.18%
Total active votes		13,483	100.0%
Source: Minneapolis Elections & Voter Services

== Ward 12 ==
Ward 12 contains the neighborhoods of Cooper, Ericsson, Hiawatha, Howe, Minnehaha, Morris Park, and Standish, as well as a portion of Keewaydin. The incumbent is Democrat Aurin Chowdhury, who was first elected with 53.75% of the vote in round 1 in 2023.

Challenger Becka Thompson, an elected member of the Minneapolis Park and Recreation Board, attracted controversy in May when she said that, for some voters, she lacked "the desired amount of melanin" to run against incumbent Aurin Chowdhury, who is Bengali American. Thompson apologized for the remark, but then attracted further controversy in July with a similar remark in a TikTok video in which she asserted that council vice president Aisha Chughtai attracted votes in her successful 2021 campaign in Ward 10 because she is a "nice, young, you know, ethnic woman."

Chowdhury won reelection with 62% of the vote.

=== Candidates ===
==== Filed ====
- Edward Bear Stops (Community over Politics)
- Aurin Chowdhury (DFL), incumbent
- Becka Thompson (DFL), Park Board commissioner

=== Endorsements ===
Aurin Chowdhury

Political parties

- Minneapolis DFL
- Working Families Party

Federal officials

- Ilhan Omar, U.S. representative for Minnesota's 5th congressional district

Organizations

- Minnesota Young DFL
- Minneapolis Regional Labor Federation, AFL-CIO
- TakeAction Minnesota
- UNITE HERE Local 17
- SEIU Minnesota
- Minneapolis Regional Labor Federation, AFL-CIO
- OutFront Minnesota
Becka Thompson

Organizations

- All of Mpls

=== Results ===
Results by precinct: Chowdhury: 50–60%; 60–70%

Ward 12 results
Party	Candidate	Round 1	
Party	Candidate	Votes	%
Democratic (DFL)	Aurin Chowdhury (incumbent)	10,216	62.03%
Democratic (DFL)	Becka Thompson	5,302	32.19%
Community Over Politics	Edward Bear Stops	904	5.49%
Write-in	Write-ins	48	0.29%
Total active votes		16,470	100.0%
Source: Minneapolis Elections & Voter Services

== Ward 13 ==
Ward 13 contains the neighborhoods of Armatage, Fulton, Kenny, Linden Hills, Lynnhurst, and West Maka Ska, as well as a portion of East Harriet. The incumbent is Democrat Linea Palmisano, who was re-elected in the first round with 73.58% of the vote in 2023. She won reelection with 94% of the vote.

=== Candidates ===
==== Filed ====
- Linea Palmisano (DFL), incumbent
- Bob Again Carney Jr (Climate Revolution Elephant), perennial candidate

=== Endorsements ===
Linea Palmisano

Political parties

- Minneapolis DFL

Organizations

- All of Mpls

=== Results ===
Results by precinct: Palmisano: 80–90%; >90%

Ward 6 results
Party	Candidate	Round 1	
Party	Candidate	Votes	%
Democratic (DFL)	Linea Palmisano (incumbent)	14,954	94.38%
Climate Revolution Elephant	Bob "Again" Carney Jr.	630	3.98%
Write-in	Write-ins	261	1.65%
Total active votes		15,845	100.0%
Source: Minneapolis Elections & Voter Services

== DFL endorsement process ==
While there is no primary in Minneapolis municipal elections, parties are able to endorse candidates. Support from the Minnesota Democratic-Farmer-Labor Party can provide crucial support and infrastructure. Caucuses for each precinct were held on April 8, 2025, to elect delegates for ward and city conventions. At ward conventions, running from mid-April through early June, the party endorses city council candidates who receive over 60% of delegate votes; city conventions endorse all other candidates.

The convention for Ward 2, largely located on and around the University of Minnesota campus, saw controversy and legal action. Originally scheduled for May 3, the convention was rescheduled multiple times by Minneapolis DFL chair Conrad Zbikowski. After students and DSA incumbent Robin Wonsley argued that the new date of June 1 would exclude student voters, the Minneapolis DFL Executive Committee reversed Zbikowski's decision. Two delegates then sued the DFL over the reversal, and Zbikowski resigned. The delegates' lawsuit failed and the convention was held on the original May 3 date. At the convention, no candidate received the endorsement after fifty delegates were removed for supporting Wonsley.

There was also no endorsement in Ward 5, where incumbent Jeremiah Ellison is retiring.

At the Ward 7 convention, representing parts of Bde Maka Ska-Isles and downtown Minneapolis, incumbent Katie Cashman was defeated by Park Commissioner Elizabeth Shaffer, who won 61 percent of the endorsement vote. Meanwhile, incumbent Ward 10 Councilor Aisha Chughtai fell short of the DFL endorsement, earning 52 percent of the vote to Lydia Millard’s 47 percent after a unanimous vote to end the convention early resulted in no endorsement for either candidate.

Incumbent candidates were endorsed in Wards 1, 3, 4, 9, 12, and 13. In open seats, Soren Stevenson was endorsed in Ward 8, and Jamison Whiting received the endorsement in Ward 11.

== Political action committees ==
There have been four main political action committees (PACs) raising funds to support or oppose candidates in Minneapolis in the 2025 election. "Minneapolis for the Many" has advocated progressive policies. "All of Mpls" has positioned itself as politically moderate. "We Love Minneapolis" promoted neoliberal policies—following it being disbanded, a very similar organization called "Thrive MPLS" was created with an overlap in staff. Commentators have criticized PACs in Minneapolis elections for polarizing voters across the political spectrum.

=== We Love Minneapolis ===
Registered in March 2025, "We Love Minneapolis" is chaired by Andrea Corbin, Republican Party of Minnesota donor and owner of Flower Bar in Lowry Hill East. The organization seeks to influence the council toward policies considered more business-friendly.

In an email circulated among City of Minneapolis employees in March 2025, PAC supporters Dana Swindler and Howard Paster indicated the group's aim to replace city councilors affiliated with the DSA with candidates more aligned with business interests. The email identified Jim Rubin of Mint Properties as the PAC's leader at the time.

Analysis conducted by "Minneapolis for the Many of the organization's first-quarter financial disclosures indicated that approximately 68% of We Love Minneapolis PAC’s funding came from property owners and landlords, several of whom have faced recent property violations. Notable donors include the Horning family, prominent property owners in the Twin Cities area, and Chris Kohler, owner of a local property management firm. The PAC reported receiving $132,890 in donations during the first quarter, with many donors residing outside of Minneapolis.

After being fined four thousand dollars for failing to properly disclose a contribution of $35,000 from Downtown Council and a contribution of $72,585 from the Minnesota Multi Housing Association, We Love Minneapolis PAC disbanded. The day after We Love Minneapolis PAC disbanded, Thrive MPLS, a new PAC, was formed with an overlap in staff. Just like We Love Minneapolis, Thrive Minneapolis opposes DSA and DSA aligned candidates.

=== Minneapolis for the Many ===
"Minneapolis for the Many" promotes progressive policies and offers assistance to progressive candidates. It raised $213,714 in 2023. Some have criticized its reliance on out of state donors, such as in 2024, 87% of the PAC’s funding came from the Movement Voter PAC, a Massachusetts-based group.

=== All of Mpls ===
"All of Mpls" positions itself as politically moderate and 99% of its funding came from Minnesota residents and unions, with $963,295 raised in 2023. All of Mpls has drawn criticism from some progressive commentators for its high fundraising from wealthy donors and charged rhetoric towards progressives.

== See also ==
- 2025 Minneapolis mayoral election
