= 2025 Minneapolis mayoral election =

- November 4, 2025
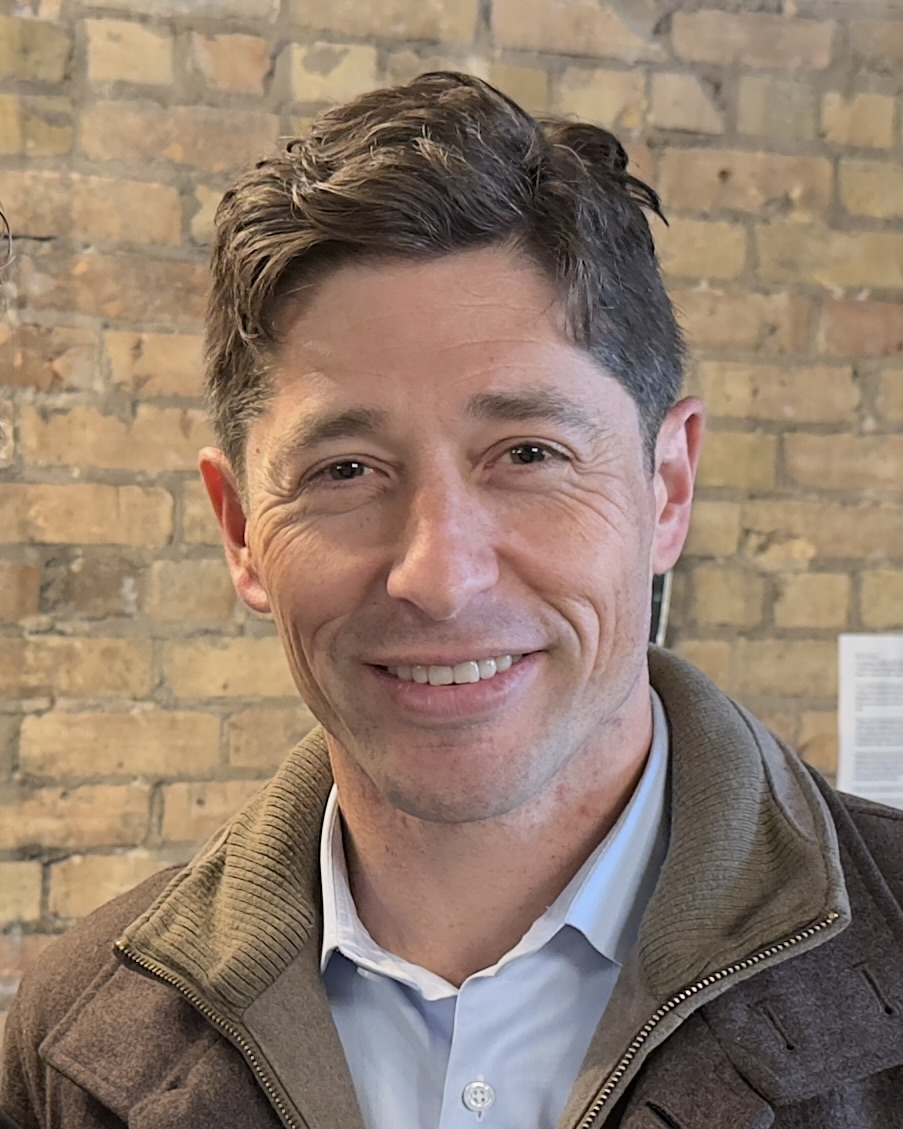

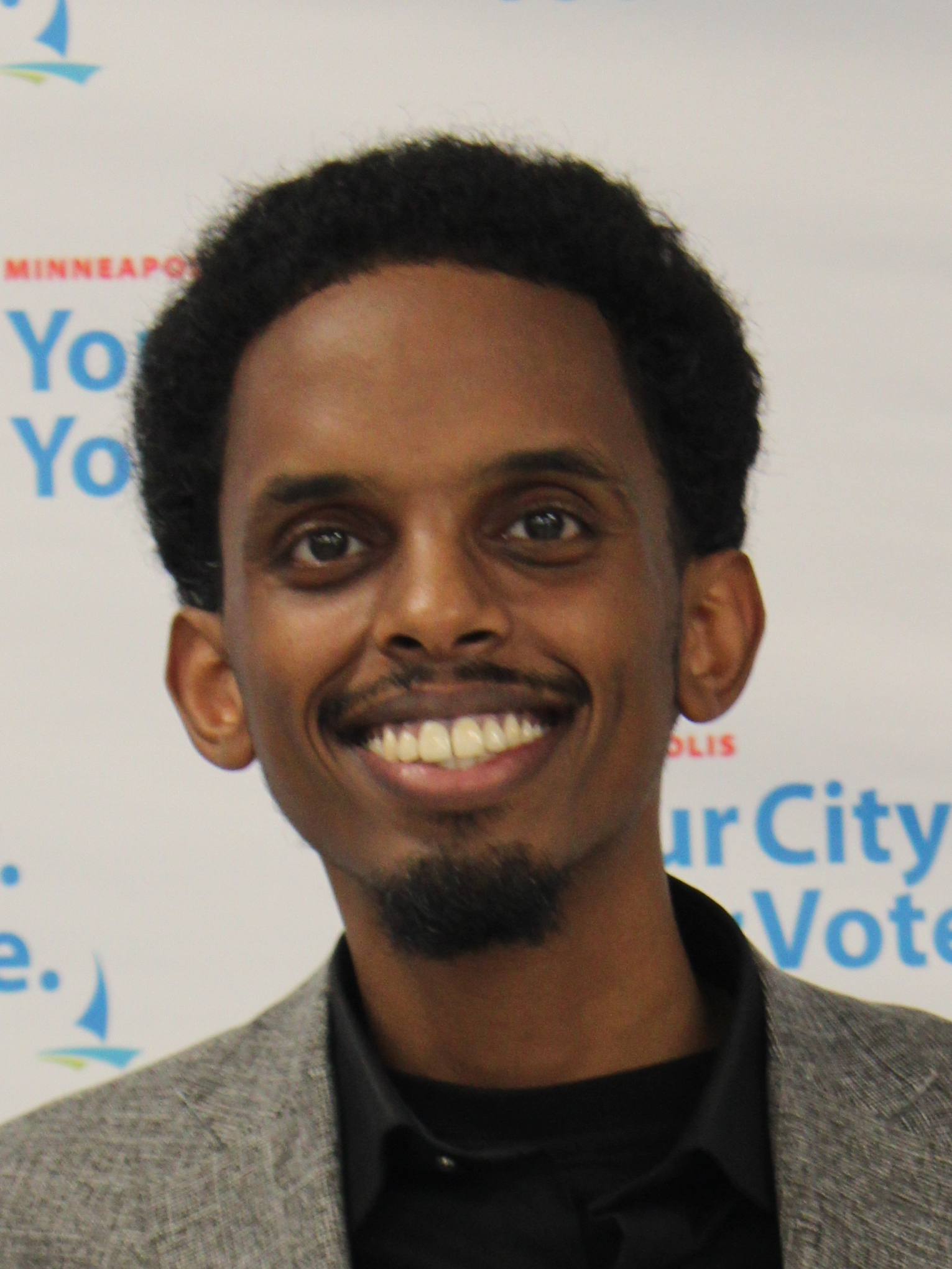

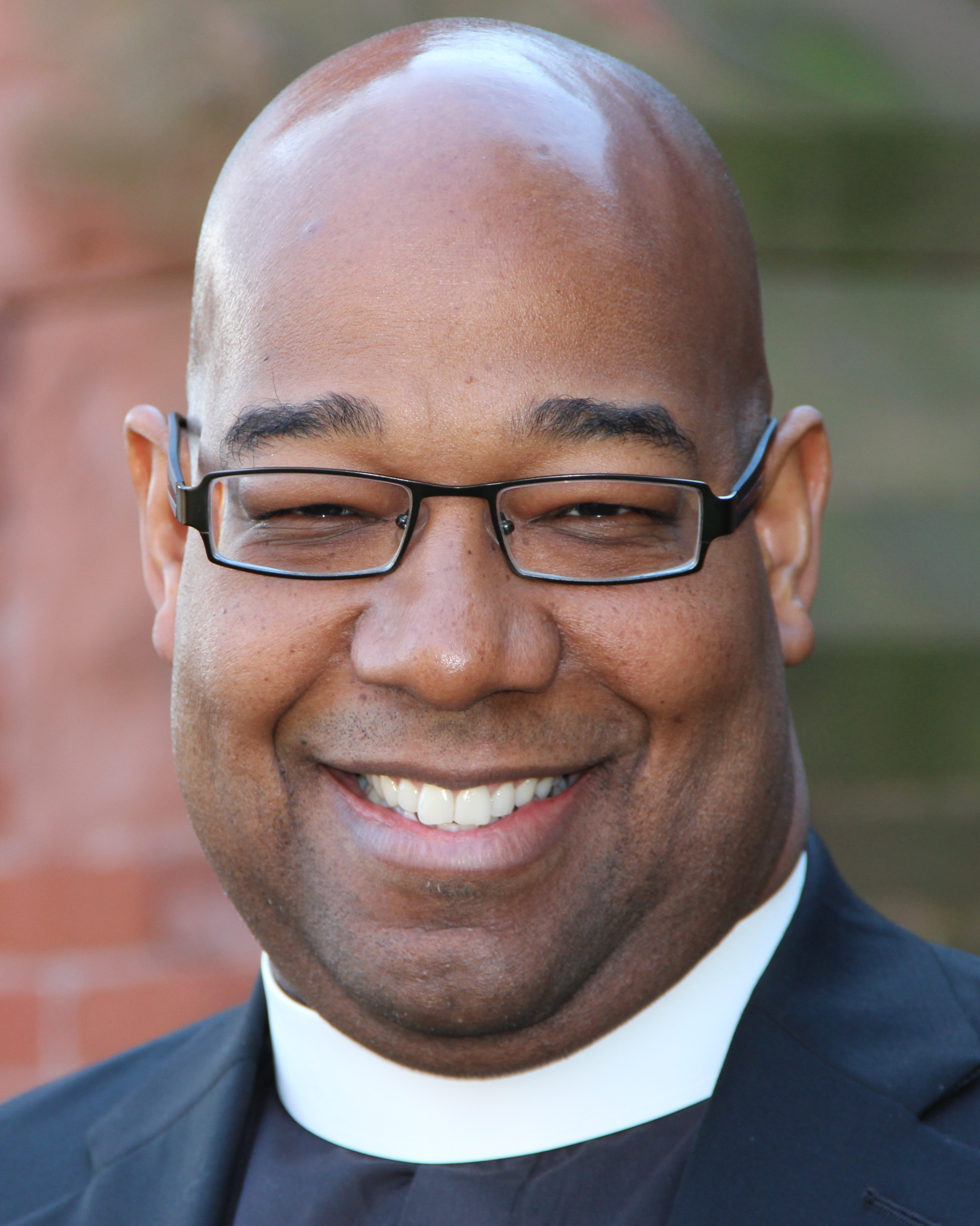

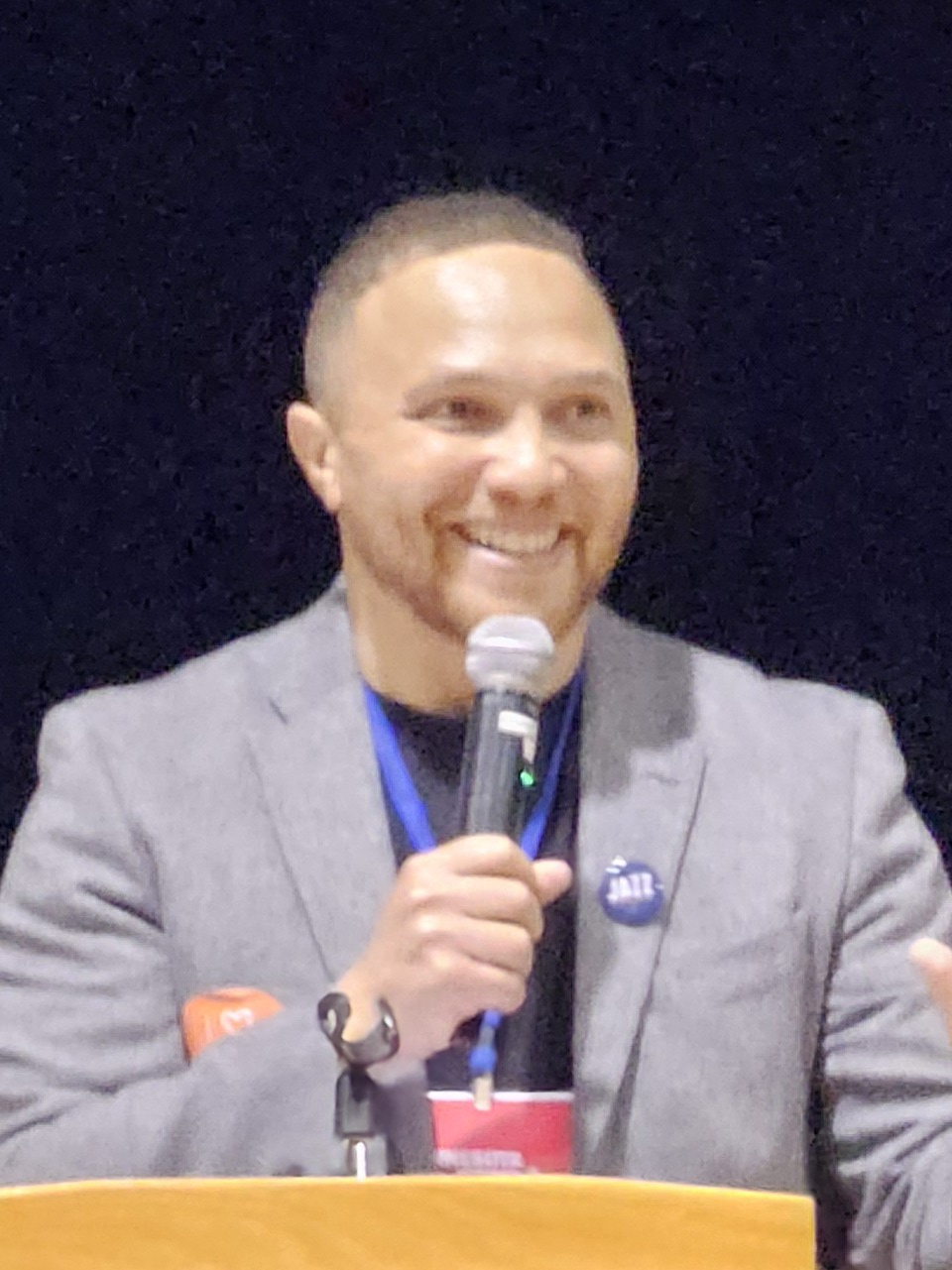
Candidate	Jacob Frey	Omar Fateh
Party	Democratic (DFL)	Democratic (DFL)
First Round	61,444; 41.7%	46,614; 31.6%
Final round	73,723; 53.0%	65,377; 47.0%
Candidate	DeWayne Davis	Jazz Hampton
Party	Democratic (DFL)	Democratic (DFL)
First Round	20,414; 13.9%	15,339; 10.4%
Final round	Eliminated	Eliminated

First preference votes
Frey
30-40%
40–50%
50–60%
60–70%
70–80%
Fateh
30–40%
40–50%
50–60%
60–70%
70–80%
80–90%
Mayor before election
Jacob Frey
DFL
Mayor elected
Jacob Frey
DFL

The 2025 Minneapolis mayoral election was held on November 4, 2025. The mayor Jacob Frey won re-election to a third term. Minneapolis uses instant-runoff voting, also known as ranked choice voting, in its mayoral elections. Voters are allowed to rank up to three candidates on their ranked choice ballots. The election was held alongside races for city council and other municipal offices.

== Candidates ==
=== Declared ===
The following candidates filed paperwork to run:

- DeWayne Davis, chaplain of the Minnesota Senate (DFL)
- Kevin Dwire, hotel cook and perennial candidate (Socialist Workers)
- Omar Fateh, state senator from the 62nd district (2021–present) (DFL)
- Jacob Frey, incumbent mayor (2018–present) (DFL)
- Jazz Hampton, app developer and former attorney (DFL)
- Charlie McCloud, digital creator (unaffiliated)
- Xavier Pauke, education professional (Protecting Tomorrow's Dreams)
- Troy A. Peterson, systems engineer (Momunist)
- Andrea Revel (For the People)
- Alejandro Richardson (unaffiliated)
- Brenda Short, financial clearance representative (DFL)
- Adam Terzich (Renaissance)
- Laverne Turner, consultant and Republican candidate for mayor in 2021 (unaffiliated)
- Jeffrey Alan Wagner, perennial candidate (Why Not Wagner)
- Kevin Ward, independent candidate for mayor in 2021 (Nobody's Party)

=== Withdrawn ===
- Howard Dotson, healthcare chaplain (independent)
- Emily Koski, council member from the 11th ward (2022–present) (DFL) (endorsed Hampton)

== Endorsements ==
Five candidates sought the Minneapolis DFL endorsement: DeWayne Davis, Omar Fateh, Jacob Frey, Jazz Hampton, and Brenda Short. The Minneapolis DFL endorsing convention took place on July 19, 2025 at the Target Center. The convention initially endorsed a mayoral candidate in a contested race for the first time since 1997, with Omar Fateh declared the winner after acquiring 43.58% of the vote in the first round. While this wasn't enough to reach the 60% threshold required for the endorsement, a second vote was held via raise of delegate badges, which Fateh won. Frey's campaign appealed his victory to the state party.

On August 21, 2025, the Minnesota DFL revoked the endorsement following the appeal, citing failures in the voting process. These failures included an error in ballot software usage that resulted in an undercount in the first round and a poorly secured registration spreadsheet. The state DFL placed the Minneapolis DFL on a two-year probation and forbade them from holding a second convention or otherwise endorsing in the 2025 mayoral election. The Minneapolis DFL filed an unsuccessful appeal challenging both the revocation and the bans on future endorsements, citing conflicts of interest and claiming that the committee that made the determination was acting outside of the authority given them in the DFL's constitution. The state DFL determined that no errors were made in how the endorsement was rescinded. In October, Fateh's campaign was fined $500 in court for campaign finance violations after continuing to distribute yard signs that listed the DFL endorsement after it was revoked.

DeWayne Davis (DFL)

State legislators

- Evan Low, former California state assemblymember from the 26th district (2012–2024)

Municipal officials

- Irene Fernando, Hennepin County Commissioner from the 2nd district (2019–present)

Local officials

- Elizabeth Glidden, former vice president of the Minneapolis City Council (2013–2018) from the 8th ward (2006–2018)
- Ryan LaLonde, at-large vice president of the Alameda Unified School District Board of Education (2022–present)

Individuals

- Nekima Levy Armstrong, lawyer and 2017 mayoral candidate
- Annie Laurie Gaylor, co-founder of Freedom from Religion Foundation

Labor unions

- Service Employees International Union Minnesota State Council (second choice)

Organizations

- Sierra Club Minnesota (first choice)
- Freedom from Religion Foundation Action Fund
- LGBTQ+ Victory Fund
- Mpls for the Many (second choice)
- OutFront Minnesota Action (first choice)
- Stonewall DFL
Omar Fateh (DFL)

U.S. representatives

- Jamaal Bowman, NY-16 (2021–2025)
- Ro Khanna, CA-17 (2017–present)
- Ilhan Omar, MN-05 (2019–present)
- Rashida Tlaib, MI-12 (2019–present)

State legislators

- John Hoffman, state senator from the 34th district (2013–present)
- Mary Kunesh, state senator from the 39th district (2021–present)
- Jen McEwen, state senator from the 8th district (2021–present)
- Aric Putnam, state senator from the 14th district (2021–present)
- Judy Seeberger, state senator from the 41st district (2023–present)

Local officials

- Jason Chavez, city councilmember from the 9th ward (2022–present)
- Aurin Chowdhury, city councilmember from the 12th ward (2023–present)
- Aisha Chughtai, Vice President of the Minneapolis City Council (2024–present) from the 10th ward (2022–present)
- Angela Conley, Hennepin County Commissioner from the 4th district (2019–present)
- Jamal Osman, city councilmember from the 6th ward (2020–present)
- Elliott Payne, President of the Minneapolis City Council (2024–present) from the 1st ward (2022–present) (first choice)
- Robin Wonsley, city councilmember from the 2nd ward (2022–present) (Independent)

Labor unions

- Minnesota Association of Professional Employees
- Service Employees International Union Minnesota State Council (first choice)
- UNITE HERE Local 17

Organizations

- Sierra Club Minnesota (second choice)
- Council on American–Islamic Relations Action
- Jewish Voice for Peace Action
- Gen-Z for Change
- Minnesota Young DFL
- Mpls for the Many (first choice)
- Our Revolution Twin Cities
- OutFront Minnesota Action (second choice)
- TakeAction Minnesota
- Twin Cities Democratic Socialists of America
- Sunrise Movement – Twin Cities
- University of Minnesota College Democrats

Political parties

- ~~Minneapolis Democratic-Farmer-Labor Party~~ (revoked) (Note: Fateh's endorsement was revoked by the state DFL, which cited irregulaties in the endorsement process.)
- Working Families Party
Jacob Frey (DFL)

U.S. senators

- Amy Klobuchar, U.S. Senator from Minnesota (2007–present)

Statewide officials

- Tim Walz, Governor of Minnesota (2019–present)

Municipal officials

- Dawanna Witt, Hennepin County Sheriff (2023–present)

Local officials

- Linea Palmisano, city councilmember from the 13th ward (2014–present)
- Michael Rainville, city councilmember from the 3rd ward (2021–present)
- LaTrisha Vetaw, city councilmember from the 4th ward (2021–present)

Party officials

- Michael Erlandson, former chair of the Minnesota DFL (1999–2005)

Labor unions

- International Association of Fire Fighters Local 82
- Laborers' International Union of North America Minnesota & North Dakota
- North Central States Regional Council of Carpenters

Organizations

- AllofMpls
Jazz Hampton (DFL)

Organizations

- Sierra Club Minnesota (third choice)
- Mpls for the Many (third choice)
- Run for Something

Political parties

- Forward-Independence Party of Minnesota
Emily Koski (DFL) (withdrawn)

Organizations

- ~~Minnesota Young DFL~~ (switched endorsement to Fateh after Koski withdrew)
Declined to endorse

Statewide officials

- Keith Ellison, Attorney General of Minnesota (2019–present) (DFL)

State legislators

- Nick Frentz, state senator from the 18th district (2023–present) and 19th district (2017–2023) (DFL)

== Polling ==
Poll source	Date(s) administered	Sample size (Note: Key: A – all adults RV – registered voters LV – likely voters V – unclear)	Margin of error	DeWayne Davis	Omar Fateh	Jacob Frey	Jazz Hampton	Other	Undecided
Public Policy Polling (D) (Note: Poll sponsored by Minneapolis for the Many, who recommend ranking Fateh first, Davis second, and Hampton third)	August 26–27, 2025	822 (V)	± 3.3%	10%	29%	34%	5%	5%	17%
ImpactResearch (D) (Note: Poll sponsored by All of Minneapolis, who support Frey)	August 8–14, 2025	600 (LV)	± 4.0%	10%	28%	41%	5%	9% (Note: Laverne Turner (R) at 9%)	7%
Public Policy Polling (D)	May 22–23, 2025	898 (V)	—N/a	10%	15%	28%	4%	—N/a	44%
Polls of voters' first choice for the mayoral election

== Results ==
2025 Minneapolis mayoral election
Candidate	Round 1		Round 2	
Candidate	Votes	%	Votes	%
Jacob Frey (incumbent)	61,444	41.70	73,723	50.03 (Note: This represents the percent of all votes cast, including exhausted ballots)
Omar Fateh	46,614	31.63	65,377	44.37
DeWayne Davis	20,414	13.85	Eliminated	
Jazz Hampton	15,339	10.41	Eliminated	
Laverne Turner	799	0.54	Eliminated	
Brenda Short	773	0.52	Eliminated	
Charlie McCloud	481	0.33	Eliminated	
Andrea Revel	381	0.26	Eliminated	
Kevin Dwire	297	0.20	Eliminated	
Alejandro Richardson	206	0.14	Eliminated	
Kevin Ward	168	0.11	Eliminated	
Jeffrey Wagner	129	0.09	Eliminated	
Xavier Pauke	93	0.06	Eliminated	
Troy Peterson	52	0.04	Eliminated	
Adam Terzich	52	0.04	Eliminated	
Write-ins	114	0.08	Eliminated	
Exhausted ballots	—N/a		8,256	5.60%
Total	147,356	100.0%	139,100	100.0%
