= Minneapolis DFL =

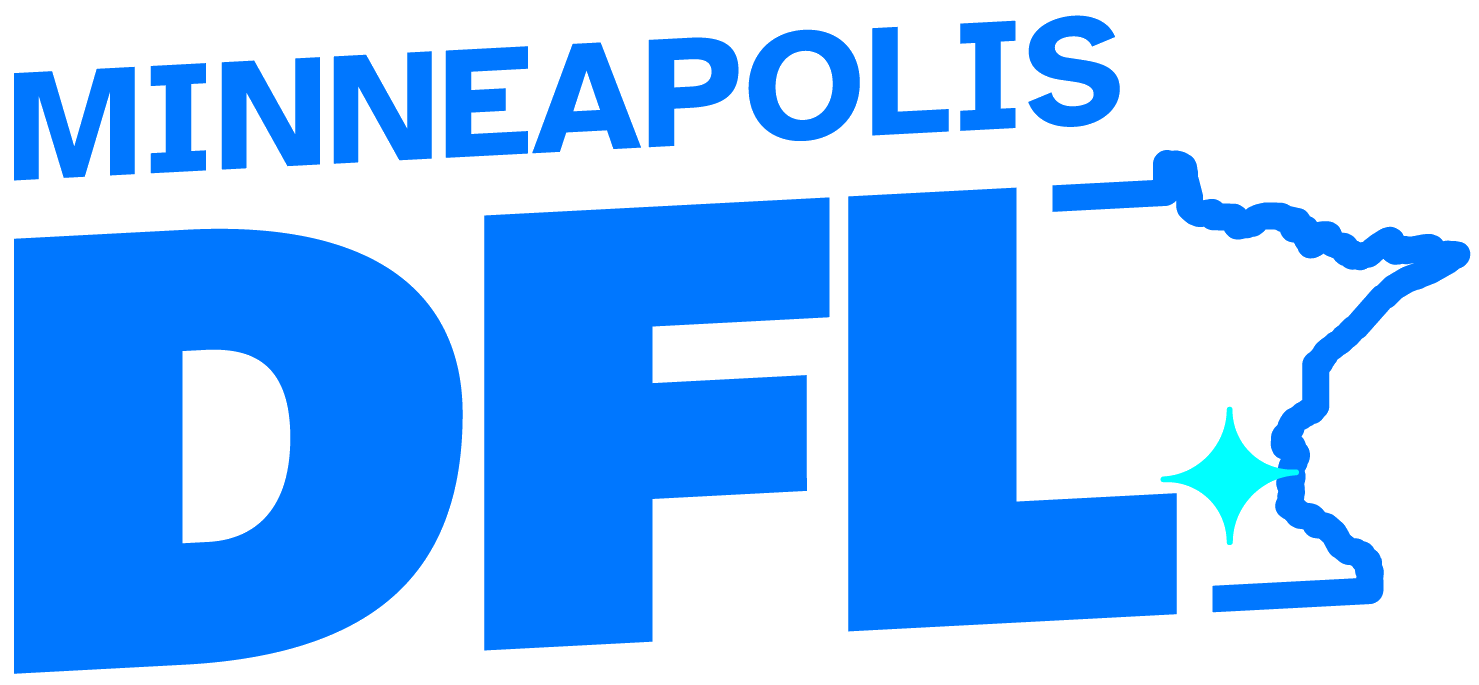
- Abbreviation: DFL
- Mayor of Minneapolis: Jacob Frey
- Chair: John Maraist
- Minneapolis City Council President: Elliott Payne
- Political position: Center-left to left-wing
- National affiliation: Democratic Party
- Regional affiliation: Minnesota Democratic–Farmer–Labor Party
- Colors: Blue
- State Senate (Minneapolis seats): 5 / 5
- State House (Minneapolis seats): 10 / 10
- City Council: 11 / 12

Website
- minneapolisdfl.org

The Minneapolis Democratic–Farmer–Labor Party, officially just the Minneapolis DFL, is the local organizing unit of the Minnesota DFL, the Minnesota state branch of the U.S. Democratic Party. Minneapolis is a strongly Democratic city, and the DFL has been the dominant political force in its municipal government for decades. Local elections in Minneapolis are officially nonpartisan, but candidates can seek the DFL endorsement due to the party's support and organizing infrastructure.

== History ==
Minneapolis, a hotbed of Farmer–Labor activism in the 1930s, played a key role in the "fusion" of the state's Democratic and Farmer–Labor parties into the Minnesota Democratic-Farmer-Labor Party (DFL). Hubert H. Humphrey, at the time a Minneapolis politician, is often cited as a founder of the DFL. In 1945 Humphrey was elected Mayor of Minneapolis under the new DFL banner. Internal factional battles plagued the early DFL; at the 1948 party caucuses and convention, Humphrey and anti-Communist liberals from Minneapolis faced off against a left-wing Farmer–Labor faction, a struggle Humphrey's wing ultimately won as the party unified against far-left influence.

The following decades saw the DFL become the overwhelmingly dominant party in Minneapolis. Since in the 1950s, virtually all Minneapolis mayors and city council members have been affiliated with the DFL. The city has not elected a Republican mayor since 1975, and DFL-endorsed or DFL-aligned candidates have routinely won local offices.

== Structure ==
The Minneapolis DFL is organized as a local unit of the statewide party, governed by party bylaws and run by elected volunteers. In municipal election years, the Minneapolis DFL holds precinct caucuses open to any party member in the city. At these meetings, members elect delegates to ward conventions. Minneapolis is divided into 13 wards, and the DFL holds a convention in each ward during municipal election years. Ward conventions endorse candidates for City Council and choose local party officers. According to party rules, a candidate must receive at least 60% of delegates' votes at a ward convention to earn the DFL endorsement. If no candidate surpasses that threshold (as often happens in highly contested races), no endorsement is made at the ward level. A Minneapolis city convention is convened to endorse for citywide offices such as Mayor and Park Board.

The Minneapolis DFL is led by a city committee and executive board, including a chair, vice chairs, a secretary, and a treasurer. The party operates under the Minnesota DFL's constitution and platform but has autonomy in managing local endorsing processes and campaign support. The Minneapolis DFL coordinates voter outreach, candidate training, and Get Out The Vote efforts.

== Recent activity ==
=== 2021 election ===
The 2021 Minneapolis municipal election was strongly contested, particularly around issues of policing and public safety in the wake of the George Floyd murder and ensuing civil unrest. The DFL itself did not endorse a position on the 2021 public safety charter amendment, as party members were divided on the proposal to replace the Minneapolis Police Department. The party made no endorsement in the mayoral race (incumbent Mayor Jacob Frey won re-election without an official party endorsement in both 2017 and 2021), and several city council races saw DFL-endorsed challengers defeated by incumbents or other challengers.

=== 2023 election ===
The 2023 Minneapolis City Council election cycle brought some turmoil within the Minneapolis DFL. The Minneapolis DFL's ward conventions that spring were marked by allegations of misconduct. In one high-profile incident, the Ward 10 endorsing convention in May 2023 descended into chaos when supporters of a challenger stormed the stage and a brawl ensued, disrupting the proceedings. The convention was adjourned without an outcome, and the Minnesota DFL later banned the candidate involved from ever seeking DFL endorsement due to the melee. A similar incident occurred in 2014 at a Ward 6 precinct gathering in Cedar-Riverside.

In Ward 5 and Ward 6, separate disputes arose over delegate credentials, leading those conventions to be suspended or voided without endorsements. These irregularities drew widespread attention and criticism. By early 2024, the FBI launched an investigation into the Minneapolis DFL's 2023 endorsement process for potential "election irregularities," interviewing party delegates and officials about the allegations of impropriety in multiple wards.

The general election in November 2023 resulted in a progressive-leaning majority on the City Council, with several democratic socialist or left-wing candidates winning seats. Council Member Andrea Jenkins narrowly won re-election in Ward 8 despite the DFL endorsement going to her opponent, Soren Stevenson.

=== 2025 election ===
Before the 2025 Minneapolis municipal election, a dispute over the timing of the Ward 2 DFL convention led to a lawsuit by some party members. That legal battle prompted Minneapolis DFL Chair Conrad Zbikowski to resign. The Ward 2 convention was ultimately held as scheduled per a court's decision, but no endorsement was issued in that race.

The party unit endorsed Omar Fateh for mayor in the 2025 Minneapolis mayoral election, but following complaints from incumbent mayor Jacob Frey, the state DFL revoked the endorsement citing irregularities in the voting process. They also placed the Minneapolis DFL on a two-year probation and forbade another endorsement in the election.

== Election results ==
=== Mayor ===
Until 2009
Year	Candidate(s)	Votes	%	Won
1993	Sharon Sayles Belton	59,269	57.1	Yes
1993	John Derus	44,042	42.4	No
1993	Total DFL	103,311	99.5	—N/a
1997	Sharon Sayles Belton	52,222	54.7	Yes
1997	Total DFL	52,222	54.7	—N/a
2001	R.T. Rybak	57,739	64.7	Yes
2001	Sharon Sayles Belton	30,896	34.6	No
2001	Total DFL	88,635	99.3	—N/a
2005	R.T. Rybak	43,198	61.5	Yes
2005	Peter McLaughin	25,807	36.7	No
2005	Total DFL	88,635	98.2	—N/a

2009-
Year	Candidate(s)	R1 votes	R1 %	Won
2009	Betsy Hodges	28,962	36.5	Yes
2009	Mark Andrew	19,648	24.7	No
2009	Don Samuels	8,350	10.5	No
2009	Other DFL	7,534	9.5	No
2009	Total DFL	64,494	82.1	—N/a
2017	Jacob Frey	26,116	25.0	Yes
2017	Tom Hoch	20,125	19.3	No
2017	Betsy Hodges	18,915	18.1	No
2017	Raymond Dehn	18,101	17.3	No
2017	Other DFL	17,518	16.8	No
2017	Total DFL	100,775	96.4	—N/a
2021	Jacob Frey	61,468	42.8	Yes
2021	Sheila Nezhad	30,368	21.1	No
2021	Kate Knuth	26,468	18.4	No
2021	Other DFL	12,753	8.9	No
2021	Total DFL	131,460	91.3	—N/a
2025	Jacob Frey	61,444	41.7	Yes
2025	Omar Fateh	46,614	31.6	No
2025	DeWayne Davis	20,414	13.9	No
2025	Jazz Hampton	15,339	10.4	No
2025	Other DFL	773	0.5	No
2025	Total DFL	144,584	98.1	—N/a

=== City Council ===
Election	Votes	%	Seats	±	Majority
1993			11 / 13		Yes
1997			12 / 13	▲1	Yes
2001	63,767	75.0	10 / 13	▼2	Yes
2005	55,274	81.1	12 / 13	▲2	Yes
2009	31,167	69.6	12 / 13	0	Yes
2013	59,814	79.3	12 / 13	0	Yes
2017	84,203	82.7	12 / 13	0	Yes
2021	115,277	86.0	12 / 13	0	Yes
2023	70,322	89.3	12 / 13	0	Yes
2025	125,479	90.0	12 / 13	0	Yes
