= Shelley Madore =

American politician

Member of the Minnesota House of Representatives from the 37A district
- In office January 3, 2007 – January 5, 2009
- Preceded by: Lloyd Cybart
- Succeeded by: Tara Mack

Personal details
- Born: June 5, 1962 (age 64) Hartford, Connecticut
- Party: Minnesota Democratic Farmer Labor Party
- Children: 2

Shelley Madore is a Minnesota politician and former member of the Minnesota House of Representatives. Madore served as a Minnesota State Representative for District 37A, Apple Valley-Burnsville, from 2007–2009. She had previously run unsuccessfully in 2004, and in 2008 she lost her re-election bid to a Republican challenger. In 2010 she ran as the Democratic nominee for Minnesota's 2nd congressional district, losing to incumbent John Kline 63% to 36%. In 2017, Shelley received a Bush Foundation Fellowship Grant to support her work in the disability community.

Madore unsuccessfully ran for City Council in Minneapolis' Ward 2 against incumbent Robin Wonsley.^{[5]}

== Education ==
Madore holds a degree in business administration and spent fifteen years working in marketing and business management. She is a graduate of Partners in Policymaking through the Minnesota Council on Developmental Disabilities.

== Minnesota Legislator ==
While a member of the Minnesota House of Representatives, Madore focused on the issues of transportation, education, health care, disabilities advocacy, conservation and property tax relief.

== Legislative accomplishments ==
- Minnesota State Representative, House District 37A, 2008–2009.
- Minnesota Public Transit Association "2007 Friend of Transit"
- Authored and passed HF1396, state guardian and trust regulations.
- Authored HF 3576, Medical Review Subcommittee and ombudsman authorized to gather data about deceased clients.
- Children's Defense Fund 2007 "Legislative Children's Champion"
- 100% Rating by Conservation Minnesota for 2007.
- Recognized by St. Paul Radiology for helping pass the Freedom to Breathe Act for smoke-free workplaces.
- The Madore Amendment: Allocated 50% of vehicle lease sales taxes to highway projects in the Minneapolis and St Paul metropolitan area, with the exception of Hennepin and Ramsey counties.

== Community service and policy advocacy ==
- Metropolitan Council for Independent Living (MCIL) board member
- Past member of the I35W Solutions Alliance
- Independent School District 196: Special Education Advisory Council, ECFE Advisory Council Legislative Committee
- Past member of the City of Apple Valley Urban Affairs Committee
