= Omar Fateh =

American politician (born 1990)

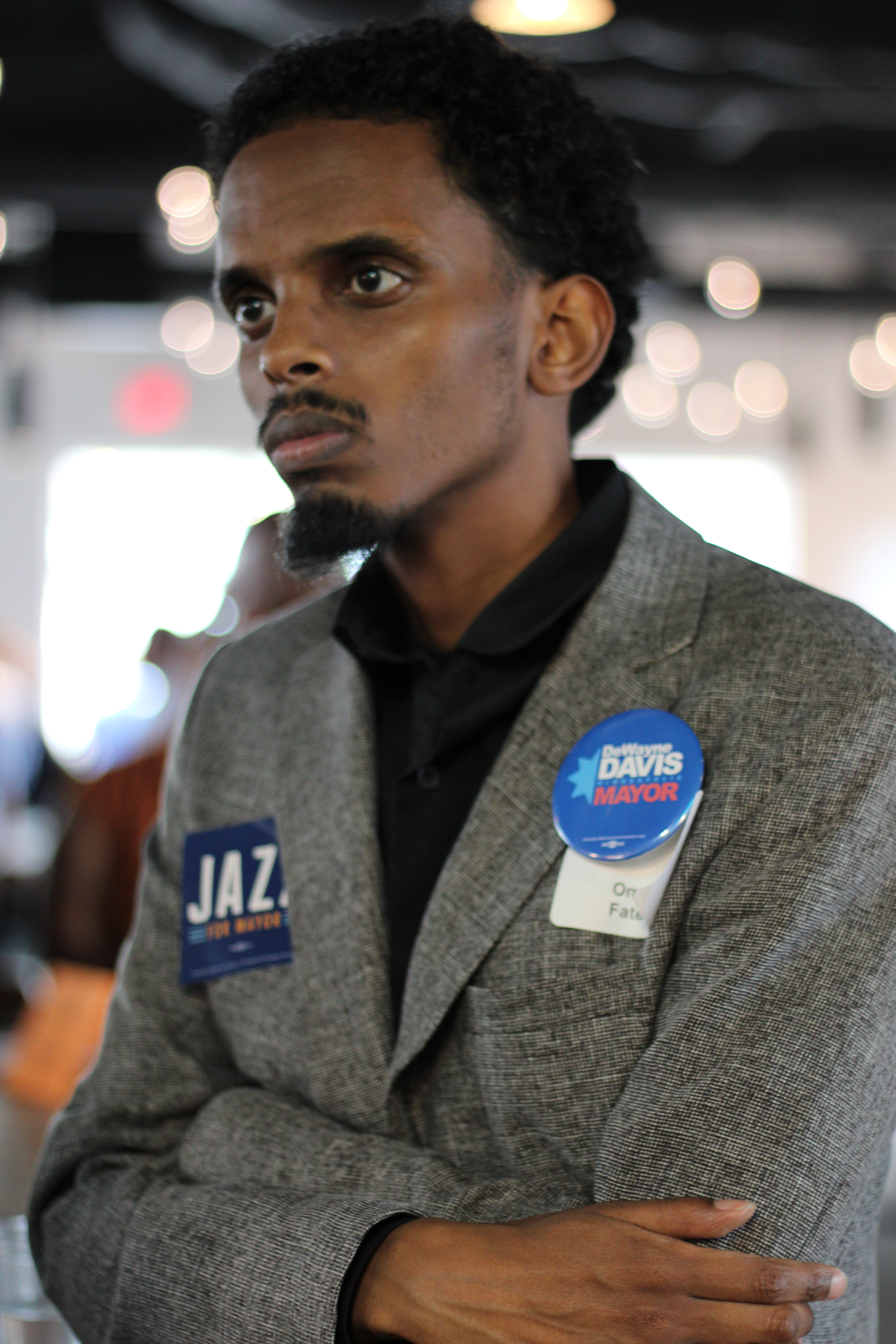
- Fateh in 2025

Member of the Minnesota Senate from the 62nd district
- Incumbent
- Assumed office January 5, 2021
- Preceded by: Jeff Hayden

Personal details
- Born: Omar Mahmood Fateh; April 19, 1990 (age 36) Washington, D.C., U.S.
- Party: Democratic (DFL)
- Other political affiliations: Democratic Socialists of America (Note: Democratic Socialists of America is not a registered political party. Instead, it is a political organization for those with democratic socialist ideologies. Fateh is a member of and is endorsed by the Twin Cities DSA chapter.)
- Children: 1
- Relatives: Zaynab Mohamed (sister-in-law)
- Education: George Mason University (BA, MPA)
- Website: State Senate website Campaign website

Omar Mahmood Fateh (Note: /ˈfɑːteɪ/ FAH-tay) (born April 19, 1990) is an American politician and a member of the Minnesota Senate. A member of the Minnesota Democratic-Farmer-Labor Party (DFL), he represents District 62, which includes parts of south Minneapolis in Hennepin County.

Fateh is the first Somali American and Muslim to serve in the Minnesota Senate. He was the Minneapolis DFL–endorsed candidate in the 2025 Minneapolis mayoral election until the state party revoked the endorsement over irregularities. He lost the election to incumbent Jacob Frey.

== Early life, education, and career ==
Fateh was born in Washington, D.C., to Mahmood Fateh and Amina Ali, who were from Somalia. He graduated from Falls Church High School and earned undergraduate and graduate degrees from George Mason University. Fateh spent summer breaks in Minneapolis as a child. He moved to Minneapolis in 2015.

== Political career ==
=== Elections and campaigns ===
In 2015, Fateh ran for an at-large seat on the Fairfax County School Board in northern Virginia. He sought the endorsement of the county Democratic Party, but it endorsed the three incumbents running for the three at-large seats. In an officially nonpartisan race, Fateh placed eighth in a field of nine candidates: three Democratic-endorsed incumbents, three Republican-endorsed challengers, and two other independents. Soon after that, he moved to Minneapolis and held a nonpartisan job with the city in voter outreach before working for the state of Minnesota.

In 2018, Fateh ran for District 62A of the Minnesota House of Representatives, losing in the DFL primary to Hodan Hassan.

=== Minnesota Senate ===
In 2020, Fateh announced a primary challenge to incumbent Senator Jeff Hayden. A self-declared democratic socialist, he received support from the Democratic Socialists of America and the Sunrise Movement. He also received the Minnesota Democratic-Farmer-Labor Party's endorsement. Fateh defeated Hayden in the August primary, and was elected to the Minnesota Senate with 89% of the vote in the general election.

Fateh was sworn into the Minnesota legislature on January 5, 2021. During his first term, the Senate was under Republican control and the DFL controlled the House and governor's office. Fateh authored 54 bills during the 2021–22 session.

Fateh authored a bill passed during the 2021–22 session that exempted fentanyl test strips from being considered drug paraphernalia. In January 2023, the Star Tribune reported that since legalization, community organizations and nonprofits had given away more than 100,000 strips, and cited evidence from surveys demonstrating that the strips changed user behavior, noting that 89% of users "took overdose-prevention measures once they discovered fentanyl".

In 2022, Fateh defeated a challenger in the DFL primary, winning every precinct. He defeated Republican nominee Andrew Schmitz in the November general election with over 90% of the vote. In 2022, Democrats won a "trifecta", taking control of the Senate, House, and governor's office. Fateh was appointed chair of the Senate Higher Education committee and vice chair of the Senate Human Services Committee.

In 2022, Fateh returned $11,000 in campaign donations linked to the nonprofit Feeding Our Future, which was federally investigated for a $250 million fraud scheme. He had previously defended the organization, accusing state agencies of targeting immigrant-owned businesses, then reversed his stance after federal raids began. He later expressed frustration that "providers were lying" to him. Fateh was later criticized for having supported Feeding Our Future in 2021, before FBI raids uncovered the fraud.

In the 2023 legislative session, Fateh was the chief author of a bill to provide minimum wages and worker protections for drivers for rideshare companies such as Uber and Lyft. The Minnesota Uber and Lyft Drivers Association (MULDA) supported the bill. It had bipartisan support and passed the House and Senate, but was vetoed by Governor Tim Walz. Fateh worked on a revised form of the legislation for the 2024 session, which passed with Walz's support. The minimum wage went into effect in late 2024.

As Senate Higher Education Committee Chair, Fateh initiated a successful bill that included tuition-free public colleges and universities and tribal colleges for students from families making less than $80,000 a year. It also included an increase to Hunger Free Campus grants.

==== Ethics investigations ====
In 2022, Fateh faced a State Senate ethics investigation for failing to disclose $1,000 his campaign paid for advertisements to Somali TV Minnesota, a YouTube channel. A second complaint was related to the perjury conviction of Muse Mohamed, Fateh's brother-in-law and a volunteer on his 2020 campaign; a federal jury convicted Muse in May of lying to a federal grand jury about his handling of three absentee ballots for Fateh's campaign. The ethics committee unanimously dismissed both complaints against Fateh, finding that the undisclosed advertising expense was outside the ethics committee's scope and referring it to the campaign finance board. Fateh was also ordered to attend campaign finance training.

=== 2025 mayoral campaign ===
On November 20, 2024, Fateh declared his candidacy for mayor of Minneapolis in the 2025 election. On July 19, 2025, the Minneapolis DFL endorsed Fateh over incumbent mayor Jacob Frey. The Minnesota DFL revoked the endorsement on August 21, 2025 after Frey appealed, citing a poorly secured registration spreadsheet and technical difficulties. The Minneapolis DFL appealed the ruling, but the state party denied its appeal. In October 2025, Fateh's campaign was fined for distributing yard signs at an August 23 event that cited the DFL endorsement after it was revoked, a campaign finance violation.

During his campaign, Fateh claimed that he was targeted by Islamophobic language. On July 14, 2025, conservative online commentator Charlie Kirk tweeted that Fateh was a part of an Islamic takeover of the United States. Local politicians, including his opponents in the mayoral election, responded in Fateh's defense. On August 25, Fateh's campaign office was vandalized with Islamophobic graffiti reading, "Somali Muslim — This warning is no joke".

Fateh lost to Frey in the November 4 general election. After tabulating instant-runoff results, Fateh received 47.0% of the vote to Frey's 53.0%.

== Political views ==
=== Policing and public safety ===
Fateh supported a 2021 ballot initiative aimed at replacing the Minneapolis Police Department (MPD) with a Department of Public Safety, a measure that failed to pass. He has said that replacing the MPD "isn't on the table" in 2025, and his 2025 platform includes an increase in public safety resources. Fateh has also publicly called for a ban on MPD's cooperation with Immigration and Customs Enforcement.

Fateh has expressed a desire for an "alternative to policing" for 911 calls not requiring armed officers.

=== Housing and homelessness ===
Fateh has expressed support for rent stabilization and increased housing density.

Fateh's position on homelessness includes a "just cause" eviction policy, limiting landlords' reasons for evictions; he has said, "the largest contributor to homelessness is evictions". He supports sanitary stations at encampment sites and opposes homeless encampment sweeps. Fateh has said he supports Housing First initiatives and disapproves of bulldozing encampments. During a mayoral debate on October 6, 2025, when asked whether he would ever support encampment evictions, Fateh said that encampments as they currently exist would not form under his administration because of his public health approach to homelessness.

=== Labor ===
Fateh has said he supports efforts to institute a labor standards board for the city of Minneapolis.

=== ICE deportations ===
In December 2025, President Donald Trump called Somalis "garbage" and said he didn't want any Somali-Americans to remain in the U.S. Fateh said that caused Somali Americans in Minnesota to live in fear, with some carrying their passports at all times in case ICE apprehended them. Fateh also said he felt hurt and saddened by Trump's remarks and emphasized that many Somali-Americans are doctors, teachers, and engineers. According to Fateh, most Somali-Americans are second- and third-generation Americans who have few or no memories of or connections to Somalia and are thus perplexed, bewildered, and disoriented by the prospect of deportation.

== Personal life ==
Fateh lives in Minneapolis's Phillips neighborhood with his wife, Kaltum. His sister-in-law is Minnesota State Senator Zaynab Mohamed. He has a son, born in August 2025.

== Electoral history ==
=== Minnesota House of Representatives (2018) ===
2018 Minnesota House District 62A DFL primary
| Party | Candidate | Votes | % |
|---|---|---|---|
| Democratic (DFL) | Hodan Hassan | 2,207 | 28.41% |
| Democratic (DFL) | Osman Ahmed | 1,607 | 20.68% |
| Democratic (DFL) | Omar Fateh | 1,602 | 20.62% |
| Democratic (DFL) | Margarita Ortega | 1,531 | 19.71% |
| Democratic (DFL) | Jen Kader | 822 | 10.58% |
| Total votes | | 7,769 | 100.0% |

=== Minnesota Senate (2020–present) ===
2020 Minnesota Senate District 62 DFL primary
| Party | Candidate | Votes | % |
|---|---|---|---|
| Democratic (DFL) | Omar Fateh | 11,109 | 54.86% |
| Democratic (DFL) | Jeff Hayden | 9,140 | 45.14% |
| Total votes | | 20,249 | 100.0% |

2020 Minnesota Senate District 62 election
| Party | Candidate | Votes | % |
|---|---|---|---|
| Democratic (DFL) | Omar Fateh | 33,103 | 88.99% |
| Republican | Bruce Lundeen | 3,947 | 10.61% |
| Write-in | | 150 | 0.40% |
| Total votes | | 37,200 | 100.0% |

2022 Minnesota Senate District 62 election
| Party | Candidate | Votes | % |
|---|---|---|---|
| Democratic (DFL) | Omar Fateh | 24,271 | 90.28% |
| Republican | Andrew Schmitz | 2,528 | 9.40% |
| Write-in | | 84 | 0.31% |
| Total votes | | 26,883 | 100.0% |

=== Mayor of Minneapolis (2025) ===
2025 Minneapolis mayoral general election
| Party | Candidate | Maximum round | Maximum votes | Share in maximum round | Maximum votes First round votes Transfer votes |
|---|---|---|---|---|---|
| Democratic (DFL) | Jacob Frey (incumbent) | 2 | 73,723 | 50.03% | |
| Democratic (DFL) | Omar Fateh | 2 | 65,377 | 44.37% | |
| Democratic (DFL) | DeWayne Davis | 1 | 20,414 | 13.85% | |
| Democratic (DFL) | Jazz Hampton | 1 | 15,339 | 10.41% | |
| Various | All others (Note: Candidates receiving under 1% of the vote) | 1 | 3,432 | 2.33% | |
| Write-in | | 1 | 113 | 0.08% | |

== See also ==
- List of Democratic Socialists of America who have held office in the United States
