= Emily Koski =

American politician, born 1978

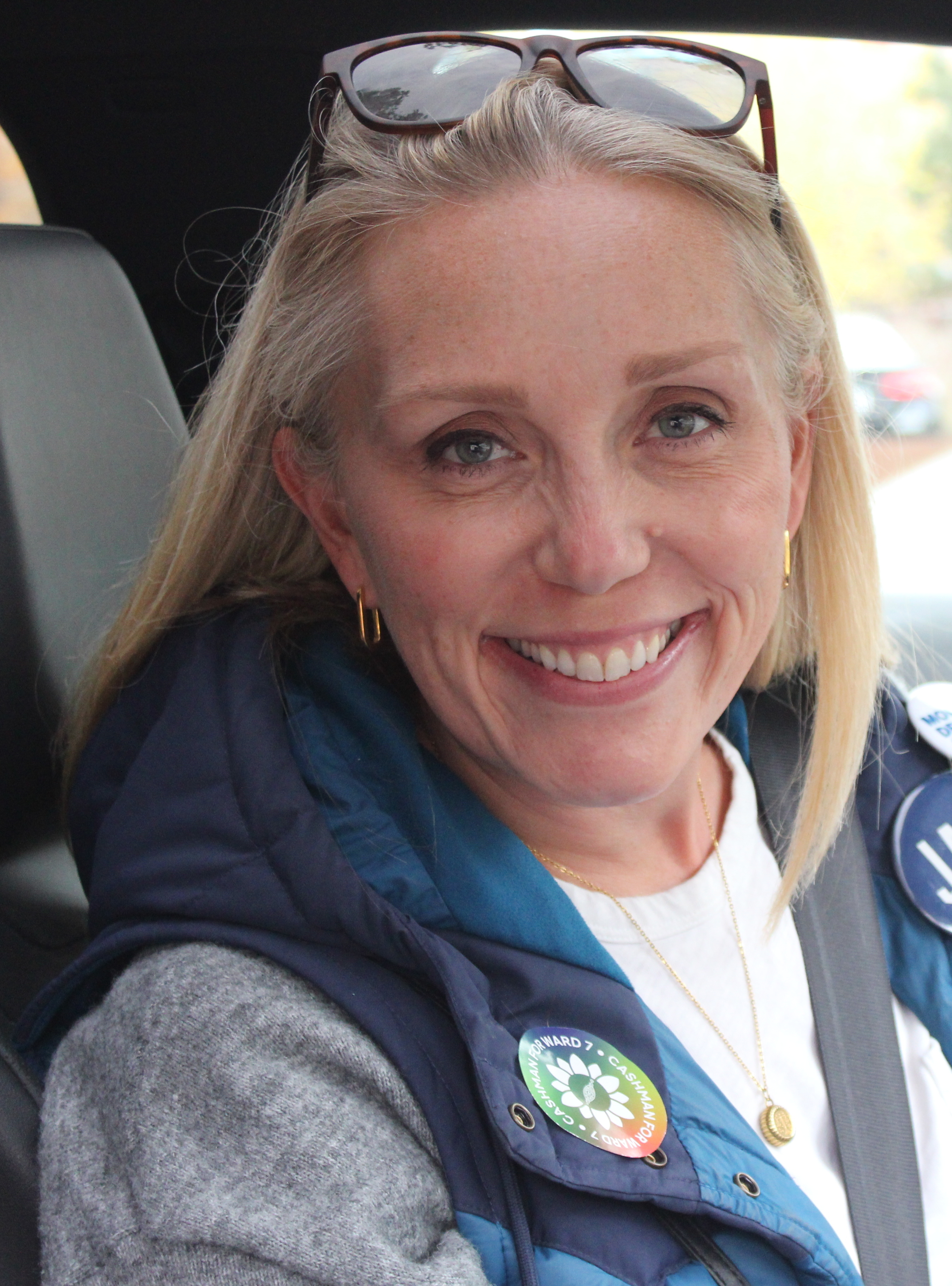
- Koski in 2025

Member of the Minneapolis City Council from the 11th Ward
- In office January 3, 2022 – January 6, 2026
- Preceded by: Jeremy Schroeder
- Succeeded by: Jamison Whiting

Personal details
- Born: Emily Hofstede; 1978 (age 47–48) Minneapolis, Minnesota, U.S.
- Party: Democratic
- Spouse: Mike
- Children: 2
- Relatives: Albert Hofstede (father)
- Education: University of Saint Thomas

Emily Hofstede Koski is an American businesswoman and politician from Minneapolis, Minnesota. Koski served on the Minneapolis City Council, representing the 11th Ward in South Minneapolis, from 2022 to 2026. She ran for mayor of Minneapolis in 2025, but withdrew from the race prior to candidate filing.

== Early life and family ==
Koski was born in Minneapolis to Albert Hofstede, then the mayor of Minneapolis, and Barbara Hofstede. Her mother died of breast cancer when Koski was eight years old; her father remarried, and her stepmother adopted her. Her father served as mayor for two terms, from 1974 to 1975 and from 1978 to 1979. Her aunt, Diane Hofstede, was a city council member from 2005 to 2013. Diane Hofstede was defeated by Jacob Frey in 2013. Her first job was at Target.

== Political career ==
Emily Koski began her political career with a run for Minneapolis City Council in 2021. During her 2021 campaign, she opposed rent control and proposals to replace the Minneapolis Police Department (MPD) with a Department of Public Safety, positioning herself as a moderate in alignment with incumbent mayor Jacob Frey. She was elected in the first round of ranked choice voting, defeating incumbent Jeremy Schroeder, who ran in favor of the ballot amendment replacing the MPD. In her first term, Koski largely voted with the moderate majority alongside then-council president Andrea Jenkins and vice president Linea Palmisano. One such vote was against a pause on homeless encampment evictions in 2022.

Koski was re-elected in 2023 with 88.36% of the first-round vote against Socialist Workers Party candidate Gabrielle Prosser. In the beginning of 2024, she became the vice-chair of the Budget Committee and of the Climate and Infrastructure Committee.

In her second term, she gained attention as the council's most frequent swing vote. Koski opposed some of Frey's positions: she opposed a set of police bonuses, opposed the relocation of the third police precinct to a downtown location, and supported the redevelopment of the former Roof Depot site in the East Phillips neighborhood as an urban farm. In March 2024, she changed her vote to support an ordinance establishing minimum wage for rideshare drivers, overriding Frey's veto. That October, her letter criticizing the delayed MPD response to the shooting of a Minneapolis resident by his neighbor again broke with Frey and gained media attention. By December, her vote was pivotal in overriding Frey's mayoral veto of the 2025 budget. Frey-aligned PAC All of Mpls, which endorsed her past City Council campaigns, removed her from their marketing materials during this term.

On December 4, 2024, Koski announced her candidacy for mayor in the 2025 mayoral election. In her campaign, she has emphasized collaboration between the Mayor's office and the city council as a priority. In April 2025, she announced she was dropping out of the mayoral race and would not run for re-election for city council.

== Personal life ==
Koski lives in South Minneapolis with her husband Mike. She has two children.

== Electoral history ==
2021 Minneapolis City Council election, ward 11, round 1
Party	Candidate	Votes	%
Democratic (DFL)	Emily Koski	7,789	58.33
Democratic (DFL)	Jeremy Schroeder (incumbent)	4,049	30.32
Independent	Kurt Michael Anderson	695	5.20
Democratic (DFL)	Dillon Gherna	455	3.41
Democratic (DFL)	Albert T. Ross	345	2.58
Write-in		21	0.16
Total votes		13,877	100.0
Source: Minneapolis Elections & Voter Services

2023 Minneapolis City Council election, ward 11, round 1
Party	Candidate	Votes	%
Democratic (DFL)	Emily Koski	5,259	88.36
Socialist Workers	Gabrielle Prosser	460	7.73
Write-in		233	3.91
Total votes		5,952	100.0
Source: Minneapolis Elections & Voter Services
