= St. Anthony West, Minneapolis =

Coordinates: 44.9932°N 93.2602°W

St. Anthony West
- Neighborhood
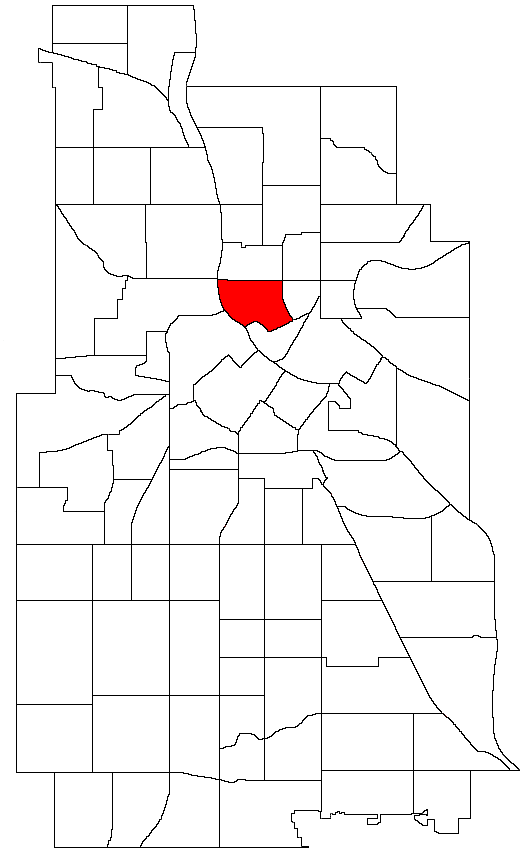
- Location of St. Anthony West within the U.S. city of Minneapolis
- Interactive map of St. Anthony West
- Country: United States
- State: Minnesota
- County: Hennepin
- City: Minneapolis
- Community: Northeast
- City Council Ward: 3

Government
  - Council Member: Michael Rainville

Area
  - Total: 0.551 sq mi (1.43 km^{2})

Population (2020)
  - Total: 2,441
  - Density: 4,430/sq mi (1,710/km^{2})
- Time zone: UTC-6 (CST)
  - Summer (DST): UTC-5 (CDT)
- ZIP code: 55413
- Area code: 612

Historical population
Census	Pop.	Note	%±
1980	2,134		—
1990	2,359		10.5%
2000	2,623		11.2%
2010	2,200		−16.1%
2020	2,441		11.0%

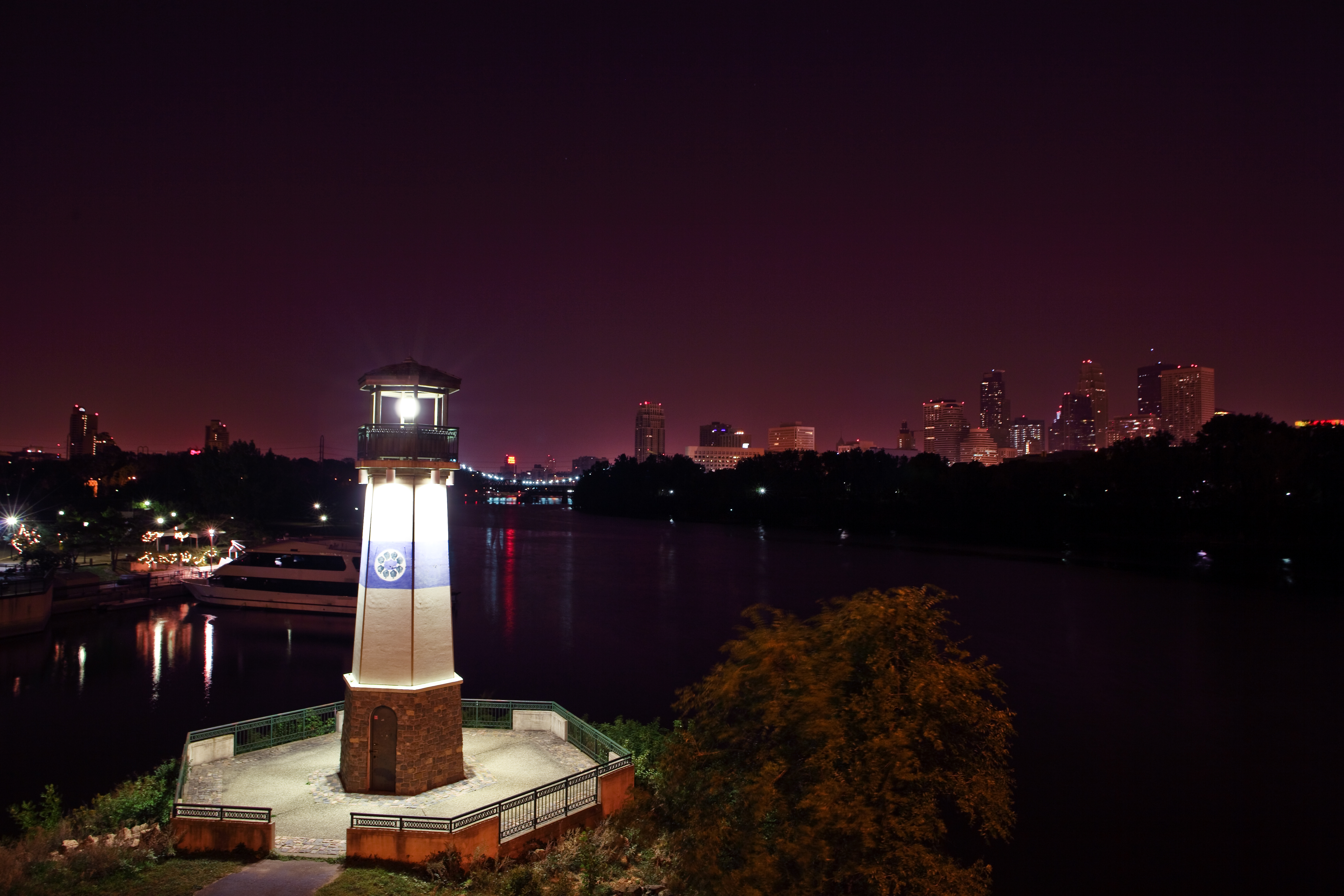
Boom Island Lighthouse in the Saint Anthony West Neighborhood of Minneapolis

Saint Anthony West is a neighborhood in the Northeast community of Minneapolis.

== History ==
The historic neighborhood was established in 1849 on the banks of the Mississippi River as the Village of Saint Anthony Falls. These falls were seen in 1680 by Father Louis Hennepin, a Franciscan priest who is credited with being the first European to explore the area that is now Minneapolis. He named the falls after his patron saint, St. Anthony of Padua. The neighborhood merged with the new city of Minneapolis in 1872.

== Geography ==
The neighborhood is within walking distance of downtown and the University of Minnesota. St. Anthony West is also host to Boom Island Park, a 14-acre (57,000 m^{2}) riverside park. Broadway Street NE is the northern boundary, and the neighborhood extends to Second Avenue on the south. The Mississippi River makes up the western extent and Washington and Fifth streets NE define the eastern boundary.

Saint Anthony West is located in Ward 3, currently represented by council member Michael Rainville.

== Demographics ==
Race/ethnicity
Race/ethnicity	2000		2010		2020	
Race/ethnicity	Number	%	Number	%	Number	%
White alone	2,121	79.56	1,784	79.54	2,042	78.21
Black alone	121	4.54	143	6.38	160	6.13
Hispanic or Latino (any race)	245	9.19	146	6.51	171	6.55
Native American alone	32	1.20	19	0.85	18	0.69
Asian alone	75	2.81	84	3.74	82	3.14
Other race alone	5	0.19	1	0.04	12	0.46
Pacific Islander alone	1	0.04	1	0.04	0	0.00
Two or more races	66	2.48	65	2.90	126	4.83
Total	2,666	100.0	2,243	100.0	2,611	100.0

== Growth ==
Despite its status as one of the city's oldest neighborhoods, Saint Anthony West is part of the transformation taking place along the river. Developers have discovered Northeast Minneapolis as a prime location for new upscale housing and commercial projects. To balance the new development in other Northeast neighborhoods, St. Anthony West residents in 2004 revived an arrangement with the Minneapolis Park and Recreation Board and the Minnesota Pollution Control Agency to reclaim the 12-acre (49,000 m^{2}) B.F. Nelson site as a public open space along the Mississippi riverfront.

Saint Anthony West is also home to the world headquarters of Graco Inc., a manufacturer of fluid handling systems and components.

== Neighborhood Organizations ==
The Saint Anthony West Neighborhood Organization (STAWNO) is the designated citizen participation organization for the neighborhood. Monthly meetings are open to the public.

== Political Representation ==
Saint Anthony West is represented by the following people:

- Mayor of Minneapolis: Jacob Frey
- Minneapolis City Council (3rd Ward): Michael Rainville
- Minneapolis Park & Recreation Board (District 1): Chris Meyer
- Hennepin County Commissioner (District 2): Irene Fernando
- Minnesota House of Representatives (District 60A): Sydney Jordan (since February 11, 2020)
- Minnesota Senate (District 60): Kari Dziedzic
- US House of Representatives (District 5): Ilhan Omar
- US Senate: Amy Klobuchar, Tina Smith

== See also ==
- Neighborhoods of Minneapolis
- Northeast Minneapolis
