= 2001 Minneapolis City Council election =

- November 6, 2001

All 13 seats on the Minneapolis City Council 7 seats needed for a majority
	Majority party	Minority party
Party	Democratic (DFL)	Green
Seats won	10	2
Seat change	▼2	▲1

The 2001 Minneapolis City Council elections were held on November 6, 2001, to elect the 13 members of the Minneapolis City Council for four-year terms.

== Electoral system ==
Members were elected from single-member districts. Municipal elections in Minnesota are officially nonpartisan, although candidates were able to identify with a political party on the ballot.

== Results ==
=== Summary ===
Party	Candidates	Votes		Seats
Party	Candidates	No.	%	Seats
Democratic–Farmer–Labor Party (DFL)	18	63,767	75.00	10
Green Party of Minnesota	4	8,318	9.78	2
Independent	3	11,178	13.15	1
Republican Party	1	1,229	1.45	0
Write-in		529	0.62	0
Total		85,021	100.00	13
Source: Minneapolis Elections & Voter Services

=== Ward 1 ===
Minneapolis City Council Ward 1
Party	Candidate	Votes	%
Democratic (DFL)	Paul Ostrow	4,123	61.76
Democratic (DFL)	Dave Ramstad	2,522	37.78
Write-in		31	0.46
Total votes		6,676	100

=== Ward 2 ===
Minneapolis City Council Ward 2
Party	Candidate	Votes	%
Democratic (DFL)	Paul Zerby	2,597	50.77
Green	Cam Gordon	2,489	48.66
Write-in		29	0.57
Total votes		5,115	100

=== Ward 3 ===
Minneapolis City Council Ward 3
Party	Candidate	Votes	%
Democratic (DFL)	Joe Biernat	2,770	63.16
Green	Shane M. Price	1,571	35.82
Write-in		45	1.03
Total votes		4,386	100

=== Ward 4 ===
Minneapolis City Council Ward 4
Party	Candidate	Votes	%
Democratic (DFL)	Barb Johnson	4,002	73.31
Democratic (DFL)	George Belmore	1,417	25.96
Write-in		40	0.73
Total votes		5,459	100

=== Ward 5 ===
Minneapolis City Council Ward 5
Party	Candidate	Votes	%
Green	Natalie Johnson Lee	2,405	50.47
Democratic (DFL)	Jackie Cherryhomes	2,333	48.96
Write-in		27	0.57
Total votes		4,765	100

=== Ward 6 ===
Minneapolis City Council Ward 6
Party	Candidate	Votes	%
Green	Dean Zimmerman	1,853	52.07
Democratic (DFL)	Dean Kallenbach	1,672	46.07
Write-in		34	0.96
Total votes		3,559	100

=== Ward 7 ===
Minneapolis City Council Ward 7
Party	Candidate	Votes	%
Democratic (DFL)	Lisa Goodman	6,363	82.22
Independent	Sean Flynn	1,345	17.38
Write-in		31	0.40
Total votes		7,739	100

=== Ward 8 ===
Minneapolis City Council Ward 8
Party	Candidate	Votes	%
Democratic (DFL)	Robert Lilligren	3,514	62.52
Democratic (DFL)	Vickie Ann Brock	2,075	36.92
Write-in		32	0.57
Total votes		6,676	100

=== Ward 9 ===
Minneapolis City Council Ward 9
Party	Candidate	Votes	%
Democratic (DFL)	Gary Schiff	5,704	81.84
Republican	Lucy Rosenbloom	1,229	17.63
Write-in		37	0.53
Total votes		6,970	100

=== Ward 10 ===
Minneapolis City Council Ward 10
Party	Candidate	Votes	%
Democratic (DFL)	Dan Niziolek	3,688	53.81
Democratic (DFL)	Doug Kress	3,025	44.13
Write-in		141	2.06
Total votes		6,854	100

=== Ward 11 ===
Minneapolis City Council Ward 11
Party	Candidate	Votes	%
Democratic (DFL)	Scott Benson	5,278	58.49
Democratic (DFL)	John Bernard Casserly	3,074	41.05
Write-in		42	0.47
Total votes		8,394	100

=== Ward 12 ===
Minneapolis City Council Ward 12
Party	Candidate	Votes	%
Democratic (DFL)	Sandy Colvin Roy	4,832	54.28
Independent	Wade Russell	4,055	45.55
Write-in		15	0.17
Total votes		8,902	100

=== Ward 13 ===
Minneapolis City Council Ward 13
Party	Candidate	Votes	%
Independent	Barret W.S. Lane	5,778	54.89
Democratic (DFL)	Greg Abbott	4,778	44.88
Write-in		25	0.24
Total votes		10,581	100
