= TakeAction Minnesota =

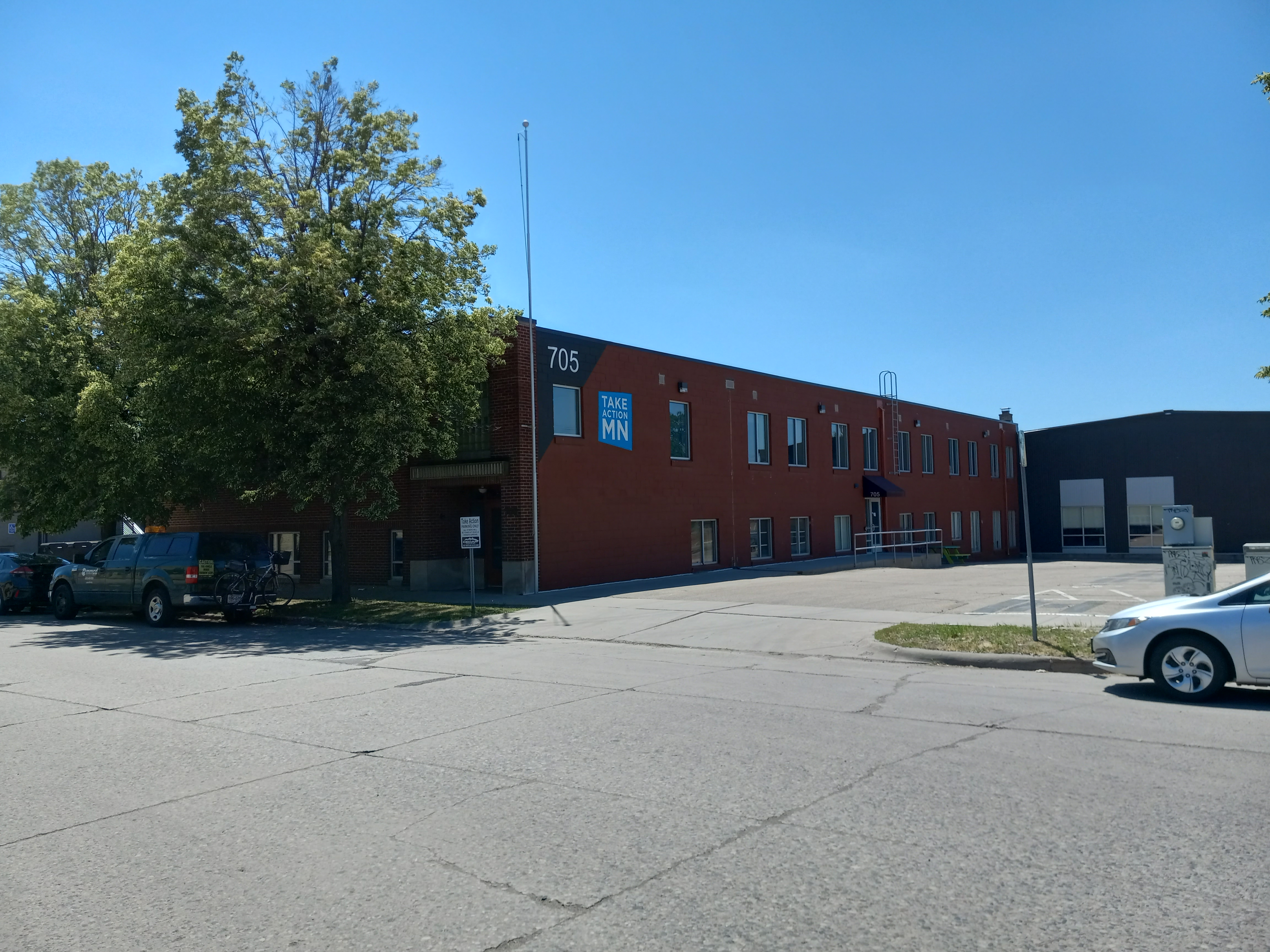
TakeAction Minnesota.jpg

TakeAction Minnesota is a social welfare organization and political advocacy group operating in the U.S. state of Minnesota. According to its mission statement, the group's goal is to "unite the power of diverse individuals, communities and organizations in active grassroots democracy that builds racial, social and economic justice. Minnesotan media have called it "a powerful advocate for liberal causes" and "a powerhouse in DFL politics".

== History and structure ==
TakeAction Minnesota was founded in 2006 as a merger of Progressive Minnesota and the Minnesota Alliance for Progressive Action. The group is incorporated as 501(c)4 (or "social welfare") organization—an organization legally considered to serve the purpose of promoting the general welfare of people in its community, but which is also allowed to engage in political activity. The group is a coalition of 20 different organizations, including labor unions and advocacy groups for such causes as environmental protection, education, and the prevention of sexual violence. TakeAction Minnesota claims 6,000 individual dues-paying members and a mailing list of 50,000 people. It is an affiliate of the national organizations People's Action and CPD Action.

The TakeAction Minnesota Education Fund is a separately incorporated 501(c)(3) organization (not engaging in politics); the two groups have different boards of directors and file their taxes separately.

== Political campaigns ==
TakeAction Minnesota campaigns at the state level for such issues as expanded access to healthcare, paid family and medical leave, transitioning Minnesota's energy infrastructure to renewable energy, and prevention of gun violence. In 2012, it was part of a successful campaign against Minnesota Amendment 2 (a proposed amendment to the Minnesota constitution that would have required voters to show photo ID), and in 2013 successfully lobbied (alongside the NAACP) for a ban the box initiative (a law prohibiting employers from asking about criminal convictions on job applications).

In addition, the organization makes endorsements in political campaigns, mostly at the state and local level. In 2013, it backed the successful mayoral candidacy of Betsy Hodges, and in 2018 it endorsed the unsuccessful gubernatorial bid of Erin Murphy. TakeAction Minnesota is also active among the large Hmong diaspora in Minnesota; Hmong Americans for Justice is one of the group's member organizations, and two Hmong-American TakeAction members (Dai Thao and Nelsie Yang) have been elected to the Saint Paul City Council. Thao and Yang were the first Hmong person and the first Hmong woman to serve on the council, respectively.

In 2020, the organization endorsed the presidential campaign of Bernie Sanders, its first ever endorsement of a candidate for president.

== See also ==
- 2021 Minneapolis Question 2
