= Minnesota Young DFL =

American political organization

- President: Quentin Wathum-Ocama
- Founded: 1947
- Headquarters: Saint Paul, Minnesota
- Ideology: Liberalism; Progressivism; Populism
- Mother party: Minnesota Democratic–Farmer–Labor Party
- National affiliation: Young Democrats of America
- Website: www.youngdfl.org

The Minnesota Young DFL (simply referred to as MYDFL, also YDFL) is the official youth caucus of the Minnesota Democratic–Farmer–Labor Party (DFL). The group's membership is open to any Minnesotan Democrat under the age of 36. The Minnesota Young DFL is nationally affiliated with the Young Democrats of America. Its current president is Quentin Wathum-Ocama.

== History ==
In 1944, the Minnesota Farmer–Labor Party and the Minnesota Democratic Party united to form the DFL.

The Minnesota Young DFL was formed in 1947 by University of Minnesota student William G. Kubicek, who became the YDFL's first chairman.

The young DFL was brought in a struggle between the left-wing and right-wing factions of the DFL. Under Kubicek, the YDFL would be dominated by the party's right. In contrast, the state leadership, led by Harold H. Barker, was dominated by the party's left. In December of 1947, the YDFL and Barker's DFL found themselves so divided, Barker considered taking legal action against the YDFL for failing to conform to the larger party's platforms and leadership. By late January of 1948, the YDFL had been rejected by the DFL leadership. The YDFL attempted to hold an independent convention separate from the DFL convention, which the DFL leadership considered illegal.

While still in this perilous position, it provided an early endorsement for then-Minneapolis Mayor (and unifying force in the party) Hubert H. Humphrey's U.S. Senate run. As Walter F. Mondale recalls (then a student at Macalester College):

In early 1948, hoping to earn the party's nomination for the Senate in November, Humphrey made one last push to consolidate the organization behind him. One of his first moves came at the convention of the Young DFL in Minneapolis.... The room was divided right down the middle, the United Front supporters on one side and our group on the other, and you could have cut the tension with a knife. I was afraid we were going to be outnumbered if it came to an endorsement vote, so I brought a big crowd over from the St. Paul college campuses – Macalester College, Hamline, and St. Thomas. We packed that place, and I think we caught the other side by surprise. The hard-left people got up and gave their speeches about how we were fascists, then Humphrey got up and brought the crowd to its feet. At one point, someone in the audience asked if he thought the United Front supporters were actually members of the Communist Party. he said, "Well, if they're not members, they are cheating it out of dues money."

Afterward, Mayor Humphrey received the endorsement and a month later at the state convention did the same. "He had the numbers and he won the crowd, and after that the party belonged to him."

By the end of 1949, Humphrey and his allies had successfully taken control of the DFL and reintegrated the YDFL without issue.

In 1951, the YDFL did a tour of the state, meeting with local college DFL clubs. At this time, Duane Emme was chairman.

By 1959, Michael O'Donnell was Chairman.

== Minnesota Young DFL leadership ==
The membership of the Minnesota Young DFL elects its officers at an annual convention. The most recent in-person convention was held on August 2nd, 2025, in St. Paul.

Its executive committee consists of a president, an executive vice president, three vice presidents for Greater Minnesota, a vice president for the Twin Cities, outreach officer, secretary, treasurer, political director, programming and finance director, communications director, and two national committee representatives not of the same gender identity. The Chair of the College Democrats of Minnesota and the Chair of the Minnesota High School Democrats also serve as ex-officio voting members of the MYDFL Executive Committee.

In addition to their duties within the Minnesota Young DFL, the President also serves on the DFL State Executive committee while the Executive Vice President serves on the DFL State Central Committee.

== See also ==
- Young Democrats of America
- College Democrats
- Young Democrats of America High School Caucus
