= OutFront Minnesota =

American LGBT rights organization

- U.S. State of Minnesota
- Formation: 1987; 39 years ago
- Location(s): 2446 University Ave W, Suite 112 St Paul, Minnesota 55114, U.S.
- Region served: Minnesota
- Key people: Executive Director: Kat Rohn (since 2022)
- Website: outfront.org

OutFront Minnesota is an LGBT rights organization in the state of Minnesota in the United States, founded in 1987. The organization is community-based and uses memberships and other fundraising to support its activities, as well as receiving support from foundations and corporations.

OutFront Minnesota is a member of United ENDA, a national campaign to ensure transgender persons are included in national employment nondiscrimination legislation. The organization works in coalition with approximately 30 state and national partners in the LGBT and progressive movements.

== Mission ==
OutFront Minnesota's Mission Statement is "to build power within Minnesota’s 2SLGBTQIA+ communities and address inequities through intersectional organizing, advocacy, education, and direct support services."

== Programs ==
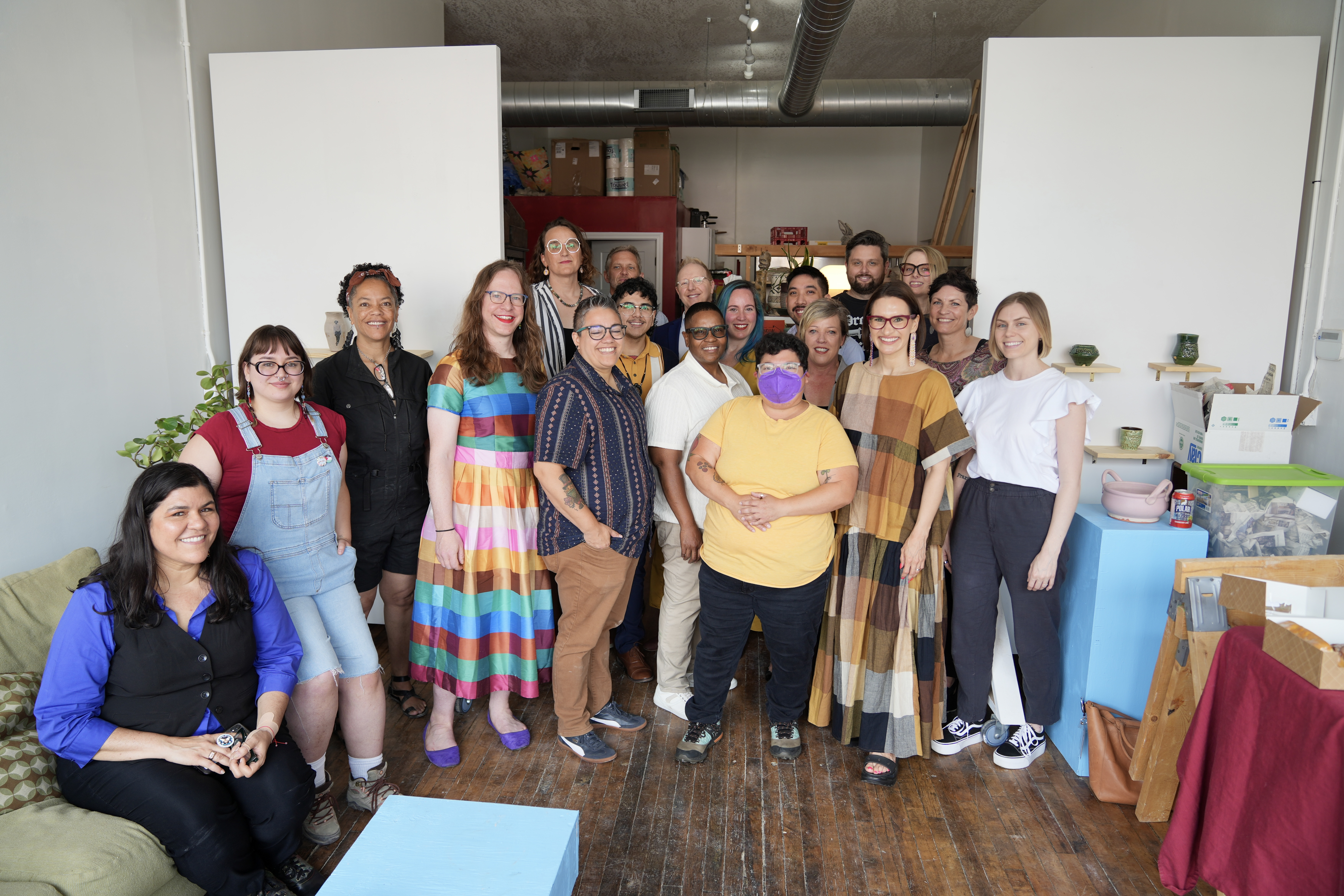
OutFront members and elected officials at a roundtable discussion in 2024

OutFront Minnesota provides several programs to support the LGBTQIA2S+ and allied community including Anti-Violence, Community Organizing, Legal, Education and Training, and Public Policy, which includes lobbying the state legislature.

=== Anti-Violence Program ===
The goal of the Anti-Violence Programs (AVP) is to end violence LGBTQIA2S+ community in the state of Minnesota. The AVP uses an inter-sectional lens to honor and understand survivor's experiences. The organization hopes to create a safe environment for all individuals but specifically focuses on issues relative to sexual orientation or gender performance. The AVP work to increase anti-violence education within the LGBTQIA2S+ community. Additionally, the AVP gives survivors the capabilities to file and report instances of violence.

=== Lobby day & youth summit ===
OutFront sponsors a lobby day in the state capitol in St. Paul, at which constituents from across Minnesota gather at the Minnesota State Capitol to meet with their representatives.

OutFront also tries to empower youth to get involved in their community by hosting a youth summit, organized and run by adolescent activists. Students gave lectures about the LGBTQIA2S+ community and activism examples of past lecture topics were: Mental Health, LGBTQ Movement beyond Marriage, Intersections of Identity, Black Lives Matter, etc.

=== Minnesota GSA Network ===
In 2015, OutFront Minnesota launched their "Minnesota School Pride GSA Network", a statewide GSA program created to connect queer youth within the state of Minnesota.

=== Needs assessments ===
OutFront Minnesota has participated in the creation of needs assessments for segments of the LGBTQIA+ community with other LGBTQIA+ advocacy organizations. The 2001 Bisexual Social and Community Needs Assessment was published by OutFront Minnesota, the Bisexual Organizing Project (BOP), and the University of Minnesota. The Bisexual Community Needs Assessment 2012 was published by BOP partnering with OutFront Minnesota, the PFund Foundation, and the Gender and Sexuality Student Services Office (GSSSO) at the Metropolitan State University. OutFront Minnesota also assisted the PFund Foundation with the 2012 Twin Cities LGBT Aging Needs and Assessment Survey Report.

== Actions ==
=== Marriage ===
OutFront Minnesota, with the support of Senator Allan Spear and Representative Karen Clark, led the effort to amend the state's Human Rights Act to include sexual orientation and gender identity, a change which was achieved in 1993.

OutFront Minnesota also led a successful three-year campaign to defeat an anti-equality constitutional amendment to bar Minnesota's same-sex couples from marrying. On May 14, 2013, there was a 37–30 bipartisan vote to allow same-sex couples to marry. Executive Director Monica Meyer stated on the matter, "We want to thank House Speaker Thissen, Senate Majority Leader Bakk and all of the legislators who voted yes – and, of course, Governor Dayton who has been so supportive of LGBT equality. We also want to thank each and every person who dedicated their time and energy to make this happen."

OutFront Minnesota worked with individuals to use personal stories to lobby the Minnesota legislature, helping Minnesota become the twelfth state to legalize same-sex marriage.

=== Safe schools ===
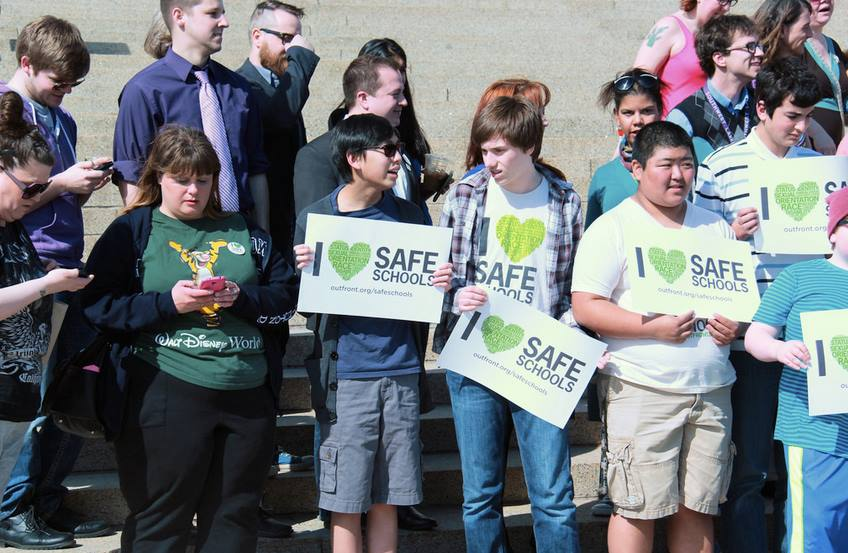
Youth at Mark Dayton Safe Schools Act signing

Before the Safe School Act was signed into law 2014, Minnesota had relatively weak anti-bullying policies. The "Safe and Supportive school Act" was passed on April 4, 2014, with a 36–31 vote after hours of debate in the Minnesota Senate.

OutFront Minnesota lobbied the state of Minnesota’s legislature for education reform. Anti-bullying legislation became a larger issue within the state of Minnesota, as a result of a string of bullying incidents within Anoka County. The bullying incidents became so severe within the county that the judiciary became involved. The Safe and Support School Act banned discrimination on the basis of race, religion, gender identity, and sexual orientation.

The act does not mandate private or home school to follow the law. After hours of debate the Safe and Supportive Act was passed. A compromise that occurred was that the law no longer required schools to report or record the date about bullying cases. Additionally under the compromise, school districts did not have train volunteers. Much of the opposition toward the legislation came from the Minnesota Republican Party. This contention spurred from the cost of the law, and inclusion of sexual orientation. The estimated cost of the Safe and Support Schools Act was to around $19 billion.

=== Transgender rights ===
The American Civil Liberties Union represented OutFront Minnesota and Evan Thomas in a case deciding whether Medical Assistance (MA), Minnesota's Medicaid program, covers gender affirmation surgeries for transgender individuals. A judge in the U.S. District Court in Minnesota ruled in their favor on November 14, 2016, that MA covers gender affirmation surgeries in the state of Minnesota.

OutFront Minnesota was also a part of passing the Trans Refuge bill into law in 2023.

== Leadership ==
A member of the Equality Federation, OutFront Minnesota's staff is overseen by a board of directors. In early 2008, OutFront Minnesota experienced the departure of its founding executive director, Ann DeGroot. Monica Meyer served as the executive director until 2021. The current director is Kat Rohn, who has served since 2022.

== See also ==
- LGBT rights in Minnesota
- List of LGBT rights organizations
- Same-sex marriage in Minnesota
