= Elliott Payne =

American politician

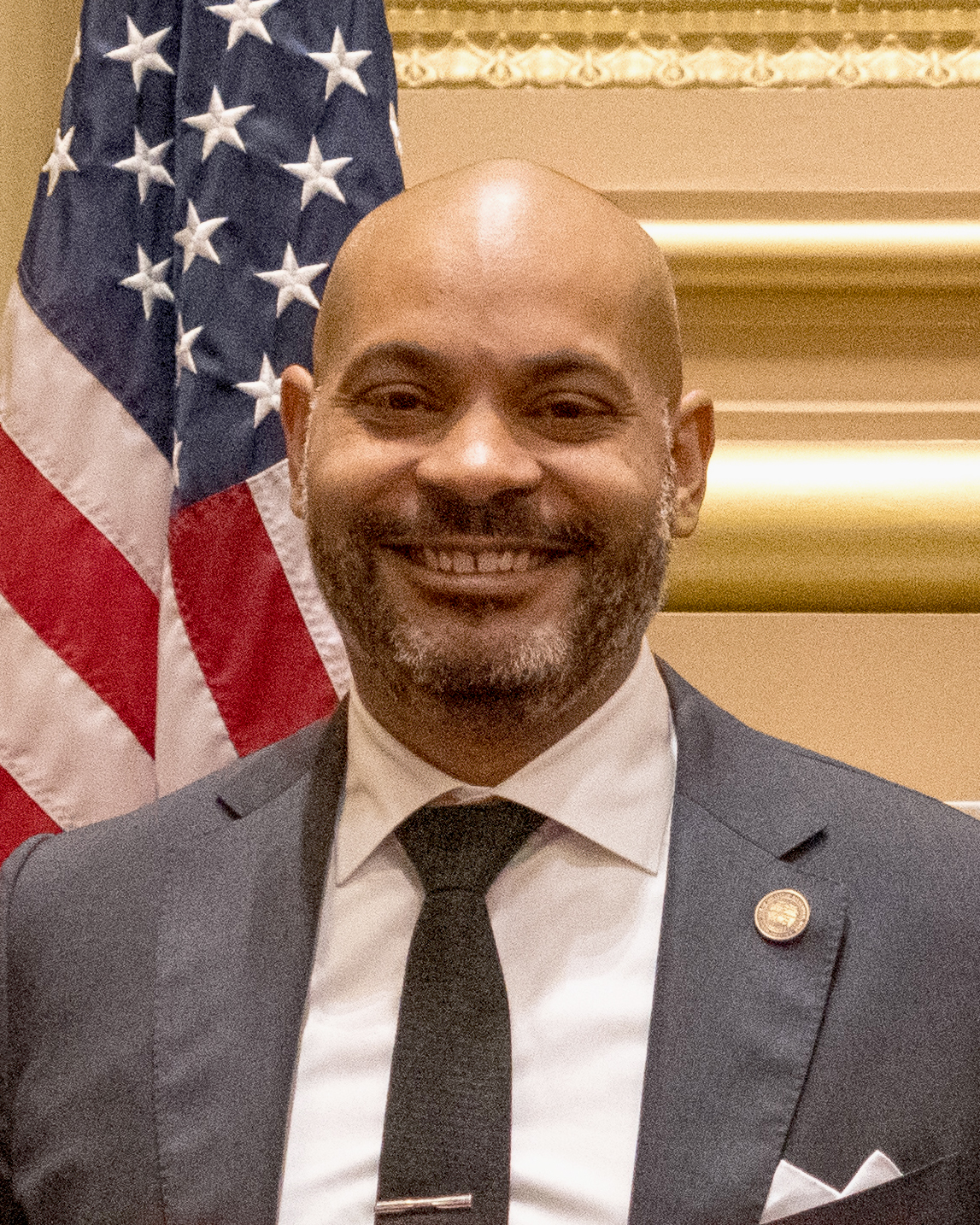
- Payne in 2024

President of the Minneapolis City Council
- Incumbent
- Assumed office January 8, 2024
- Vice President: Aisha Chughtai (2024-2025); Jamal Osman (since 2026)
- Preceded by: Andrea Jenkins

Member of the Minneapolis City Council from Ward 1
- Incumbent
- Assumed office January 3, 2022
- Preceded by: Kevin Reich

Personal details
- Born: Milwaukee, Wisconsin
- Party: Democratic (DFL)
- Education: University of Minnesota (BA); University of Minnesota- Carlson School of Management (MBA)
- Website: Campaign website

Elliott Payne is an American politician and consultant serving since 2022 as president of the Minneapolis City Council. A member of the DFL, he is the first Black council member to represent Ward 1, and the first Black man to serve as council president.

== Early life and education ==
Payne grew up on the north side of Milwaukee, raised by a single mother. He moved to Minneapolis, Minnesota, to pursue a bachelor's degree in engineering at the University of Minnesota. Payne received a master's degree in business administration from the Carlson School of Management in 2010.

== Career ==
=== Early career ===
Payne began his career as an engineer, then moved toward digital advertising and software design consulting. He briefly worked as an adjunct professor at the Minneapolis College of Art and Design.

In 2016, Payne joined the City of Minneapolis Office of Performance and Innovation. In his time at the OPI, he consulted on alternative public safety responses and helped establish the Behavioral Crisis Response team.

=== Minneapolis City Council ===
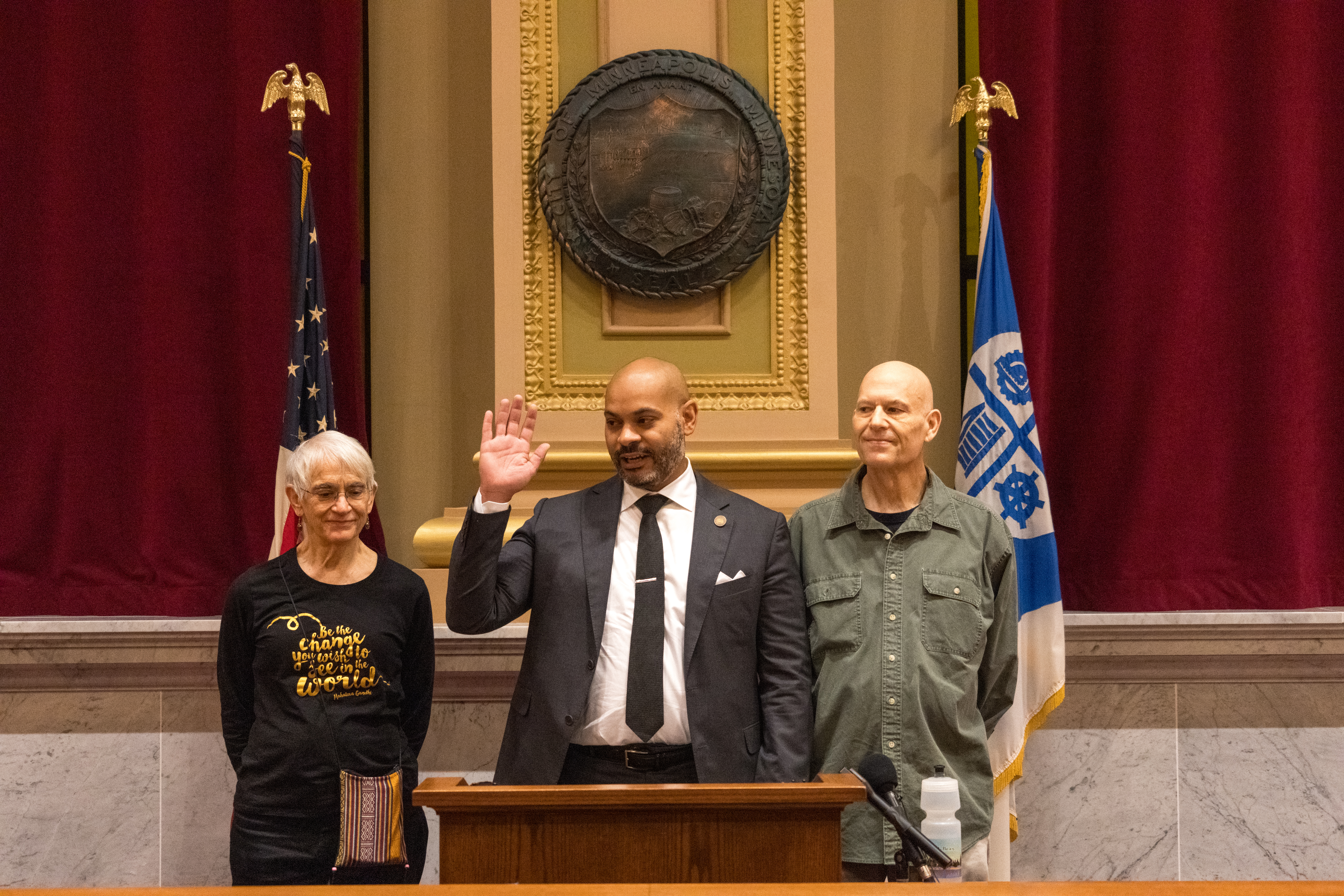
Payne taking the oath of office in 2024.

Payne ran for city council in 2021 against the more moderate incumbent Kevin Reich, with a platform based on racial equity and an overhaul of policing. He won the election in the second round of ranked-choice tabulation with 50.2% of the vote. He was sworn into office on January 3, 2022.

Payne was reelected in 2023 with 89.7% of the vote over challenger Edwin Fruit of the Socialist Workers Party. His reelection was part of a shift in the council's alignment: a left-wing coalition endorsed by Minneapolis for the Many and/or the Minneapolis DSA won a majority of city council seats. He was elected council president by a 10–3 vote in January 2024, serving alongside council vice president Aisha Chughtai. He also serves as the vice-chair of the Settlement Agreement & Consent Decree Subcommittee and is a member of the Public Health & Safety Committee.

== Personal life ==
Payne lives in Minneapolis's Audubon Park neighborhood with his wife, Lindsay. He is an avid cyclist and commutes to work via bicycle.
