= Esther Agbaje =

American state politician (born 1985)

Member of the Minnesota House of Representatives from district 59B (North Minneapolis)
- Incumbent
- Assumed office January 5, 2021
- Preceded by: Raymond Dehn

Personal details
- Born: March 19, 1985 (age 41) Saint Paul, Minnesota, U.S.
- Party: Democratic (DFL)
- Education: George Washington University (BA); University of Pennsylvania (MPA); Harvard University (JD)
- Occupation: Attorney
- Website: Campaign website

Esther Agbaje (/əɡ'bæd͡ʒeɪ̯/, əɡ-BAJ-ay; born March 19, 1985) is an American politician serving in the Minnesota House of Representatives since 2021. A member of the Minnesota Democratic–Farmer–Labor Party (DFL), Agbaje represents District 59B, which includes portions of north and downtown Minneapolis in Hennepin County, Minnesota.

== Early life, education, and career ==
Agbaje was born in Saint Paul, Minnesota, to parents who immigrated to Minnesota from Nigeria. She grew up in Brainerd and Faribault, and graduated from Shattuck-St. Mary's Boarding School.

Agbaje graduated from George Washington University with a bachelor of arts in political science, the University of Pennsylvania with a master of public administration, and Harvard University with a juris doctor. As a law student, she worked at Harvard's Legal Aid Bureau and volunteered for Volunteer Lawyers Network Housing Court Project.

Before law school, Agbaje worked at the United States Department of State as a Foreign Service Officer focusing on the Middle East. She is an associate attorney with Ciresi Conlin LLP, where she practices in general civil litigation and medical malpractice. She also did pro bono work helping renters dealing with housing insecurity and evictions.

== Minnesota House of Representatives ==
Agbaje was first elected to the Minnesota House of Representatives in 2020 and reelected in 2022 and 2024. In 2019, she challenged four-term DFL incumbent Raymond Dehn, winning the DFL endorsement and defeating Dehn in the primary election.

Agbaje serves as co-vice chair of the Ways and Means Committee, and sits on the Agriculture Finance and Policy and Housing Finance and Policy Committees. She served as an assistant majority leader from 2023 to 2024. Agbaje co-chairs the House People of Color & Indigenous (POCI) Caucus and is vice chair of the Black Maternal Health Caucus.

=== Bills chief authored that became law ===
==== Legislative Session 93 (2023-2024) ====
- HF0037 CROWN Act
- HF0366 Reproductive Freedom Defense Act
- SF0716 Minnesota African American Family Preservation and Child Welfare Disproportionality Act
- SF3492 Tenants Bill of Rights
- HF3589 In rem jurisdiction clarified for judicial proceedings.

=== Political positions ===
==== Housing and tenants' rights ====
Agbaje has called for greater investment in housing, calling housing a human right, and authored a bill that would provide $45 million in funding to Minneapolis to repair affordable housing units.

As vice chair of the Housing Committee, Agbaje authored many tenant protection provisions contained in the final housing budget, saying expungement of eviction filings was her top concern due to its impact on people's ability to find housing. She sponsored legislation that gave more rights and protections to those who use self-storage units, especially those who have recently been evicted.

==== The CROWN Act ====
Agbaje authored the Creating a Respectful and Open World for Natural Hair (CROWN) Act. The legislation adds a definition of race that includes natural hairstyles and protects Minnesotans from discrimination based on hairstyle. Agbaje testified about her experience straightening her hair for fear of losing a job or not being perceived as professional. The legislation passed the House in February 2022 but was not acted on by the Republican-controlled Minnesota Senate. In 2023 the bill passed both houses of the legislature and was signed by Governor Tim Walz.

==== Public safety and criminal justice reform ====
Agbaje signed on to a letter by U.S. Representative Ilhan Omar asking the Department of Justice to expand its investigation into the Minneapolis Police Department following the murder of George Floyd. Agbaje lived in the apartment building where Minneapolis police shot and killed Amir Locke and has been a longtime supporter of police reform, including banning no-knock warrants.

In 2023 she authored legislation to eliminate fees that state inmates pay for phone calls, saying it will help inmates stay connected with their families and reenter society after incarceration. She also wrote a law lowering the threshold for pardons and commutations from unanimous support of the state Board of Pardons to a two-thirds majority.

During the 2021 Minneapolis mayoral election, Agbaje did not endorse incumbent Jacob Frey, and signed on to a letter that advocated for a "new mayor" who would do more to end racial disparities and increase public safety. She supported voting "yes" on City Question 2, which would have renamed the Minneapolis Police Department the Minneapolis Department of Public Safety, removed minimum staffing levels for sworn officers, and shifted oversight of the new agency from the mayor's office to the city council.

==== Other political positions ====
Agbaje is pro-choice, and in 2023 authored a bill that offered legal protections to patients who travel to Minnesota for an abortion and the providers who treat them. She sponsored a bill that would allow undocumented immigrants to access MinnesotaCare, the state's health insurance for low-income families.

In 2023, Agbaje advocated against fully eliminating the state tax on Social Security income, saying it should be targeted to low- and middle-income seniors. She joined environmental advocates in pushing for the closing of a metal shredder in North Minneapolis after a stockpile caught fire.

== Electoral history ==
2020 DFL Primary for Minnesota State House − District 59B
Party	Candidate	Votes	%
Democratic (DFL)	Esther Agbaje	4,443	48.24
Democratic (DFL)	Raymond Dehn (incumbent)	3,839	41.65
Democratic (DFL)	Isaiah Whitmore	932	10.24
Total votes		9,211	100.0

2020 Minnesota State House − District 59B
Party	Candidate	Votes	%
Democratic (DFL)	Esther Agbaje	17,649	74.35
Republican	Alan Shilepsky	4,249	17.90
Green	Lisa Neal-Delgado	1,804	7.60
Write-in		37	0.16
Total votes		23,739	100.0
Democratic (DFL) hold			

2022 Minnesota State House − District 59B
Party	Candidate	Votes	%
Democratic (DFL)	Esther Agbaje (incumbent)	13,225	98.51
Write-in		200	1.49
Total votes		13,425	100.0
Democratic (DFL) hold			

2024 Minnesota State House − District 59B
Party	Candidate	Votes	%
Democratic (DFL)	Esther Agbaje (incumbent)	16,791	82.34
Republican	Kenneth Smoron	3,549	17.4
Write-in		52	0.26
Total votes		20,392	100.0
Democratic (DFL) hold			

== Personal life ==
Agbaje lives in Minneapolis, Minnesota.
