= 2017 Minneapolis mayoral election =

- November 7, 2017
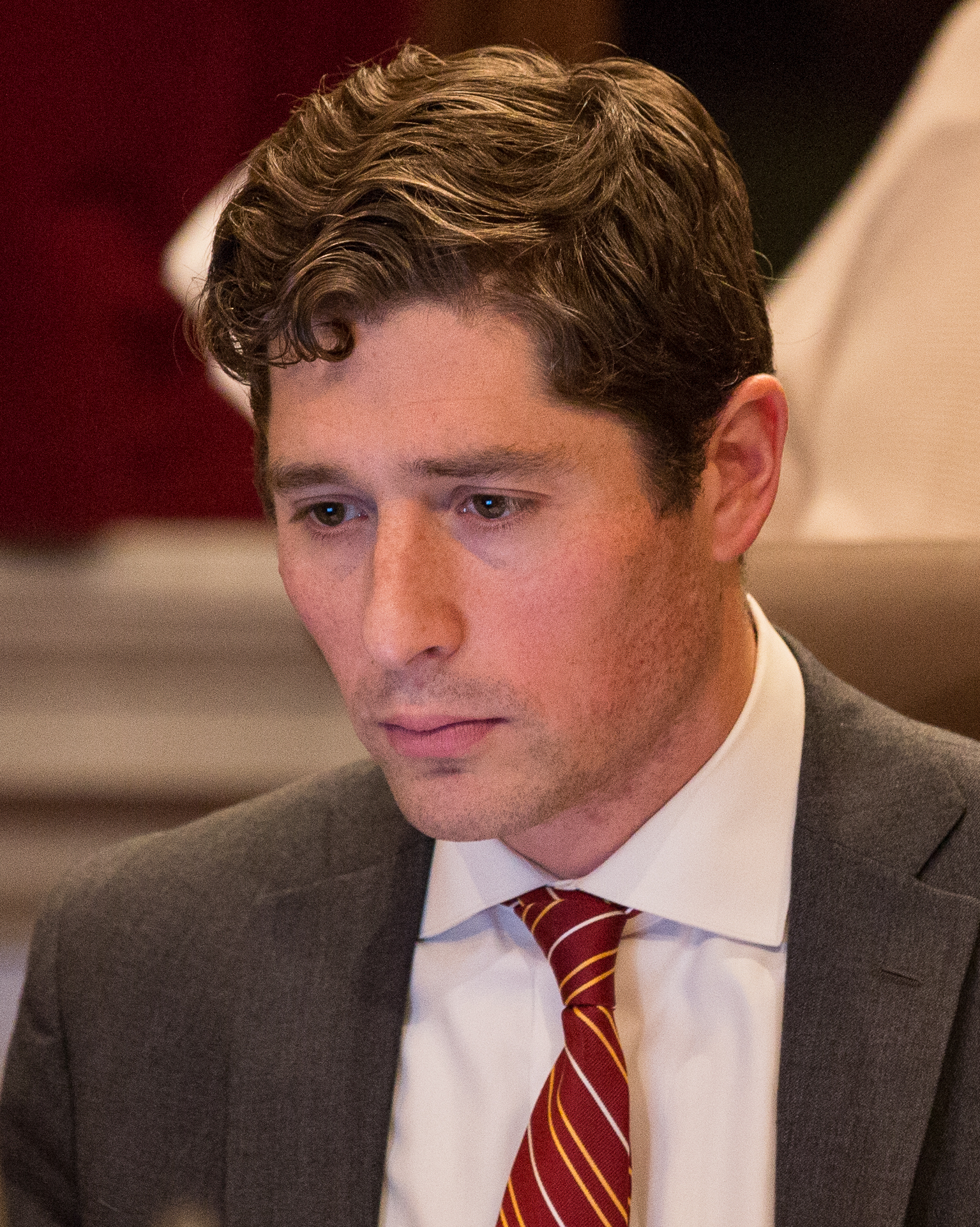

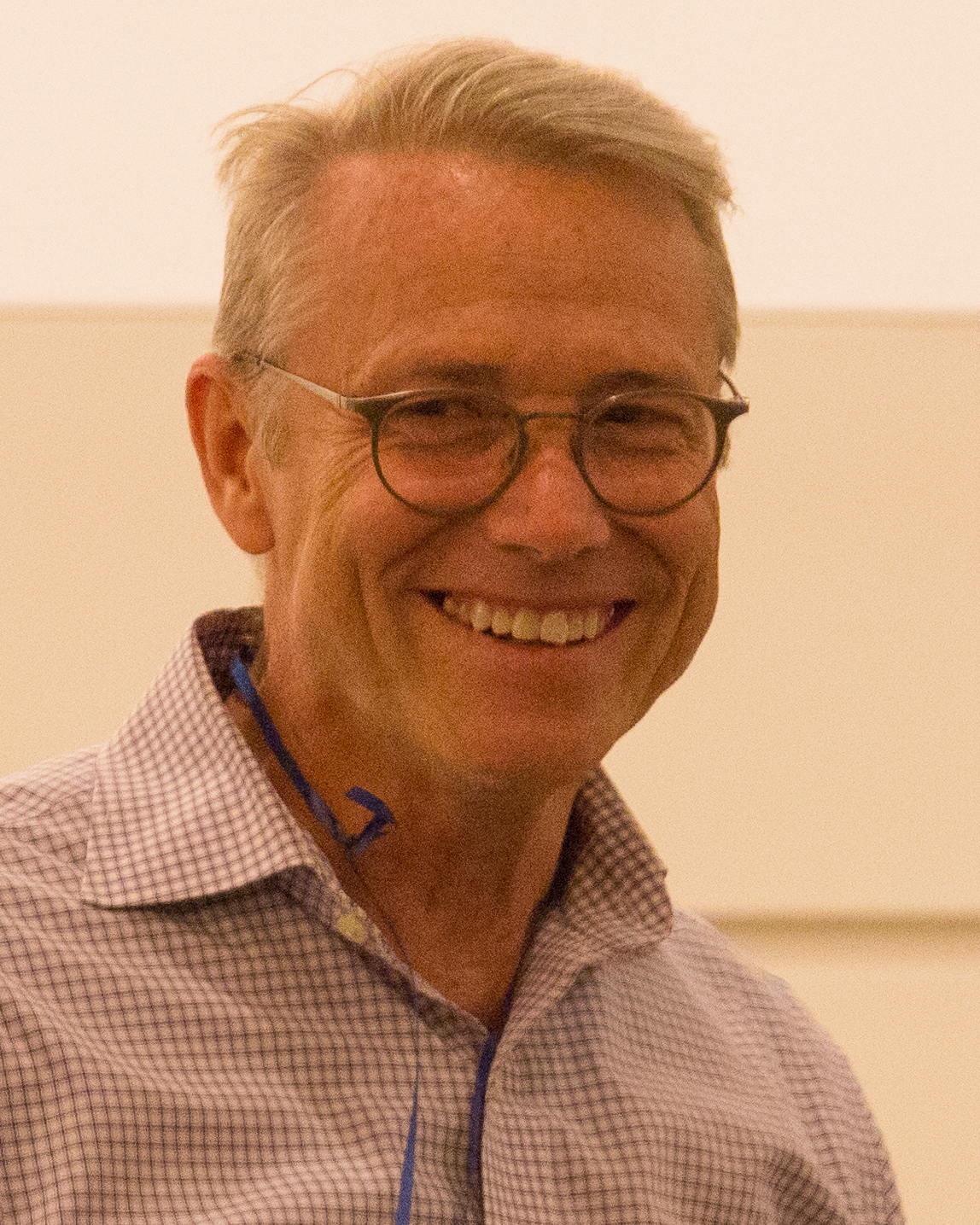

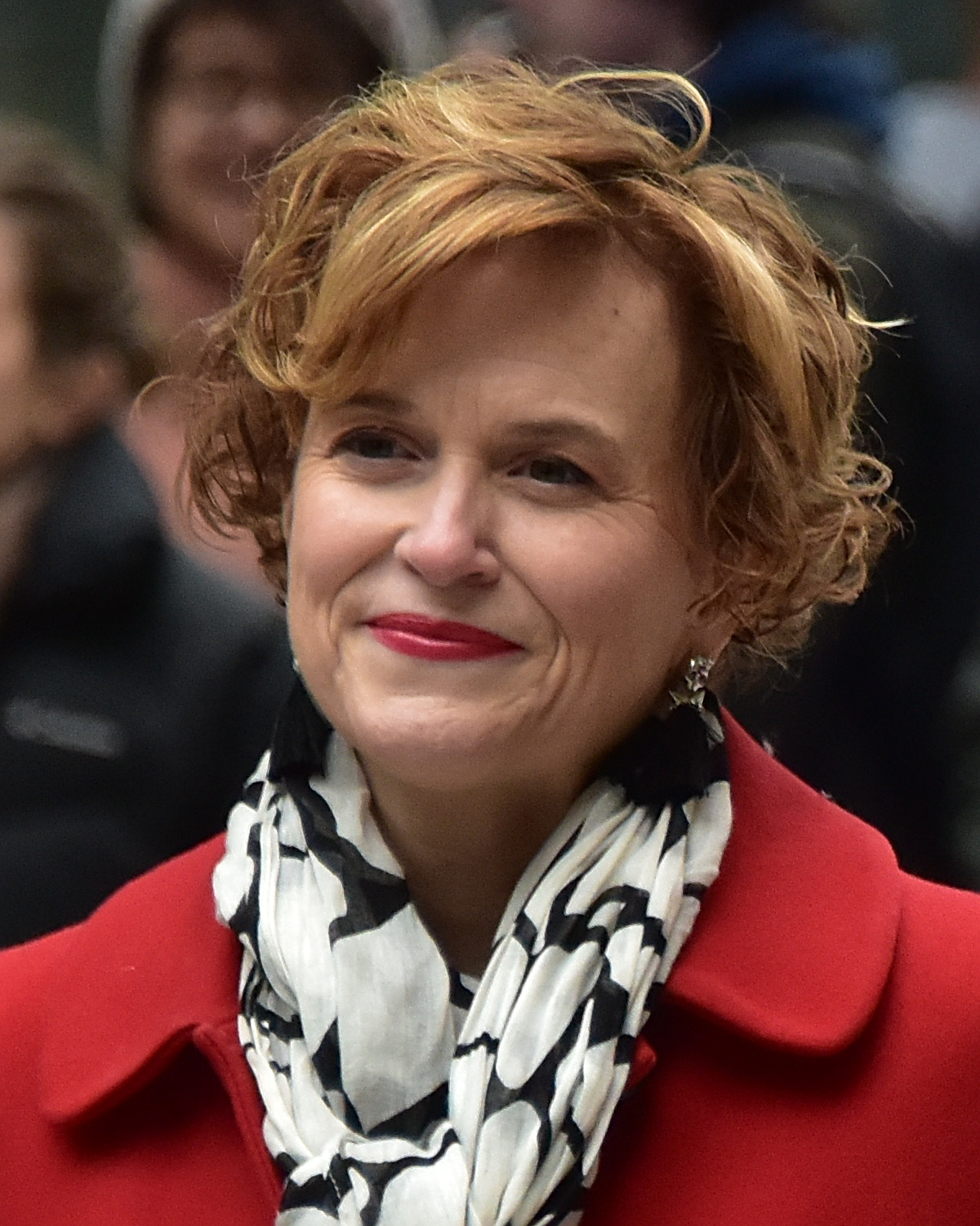

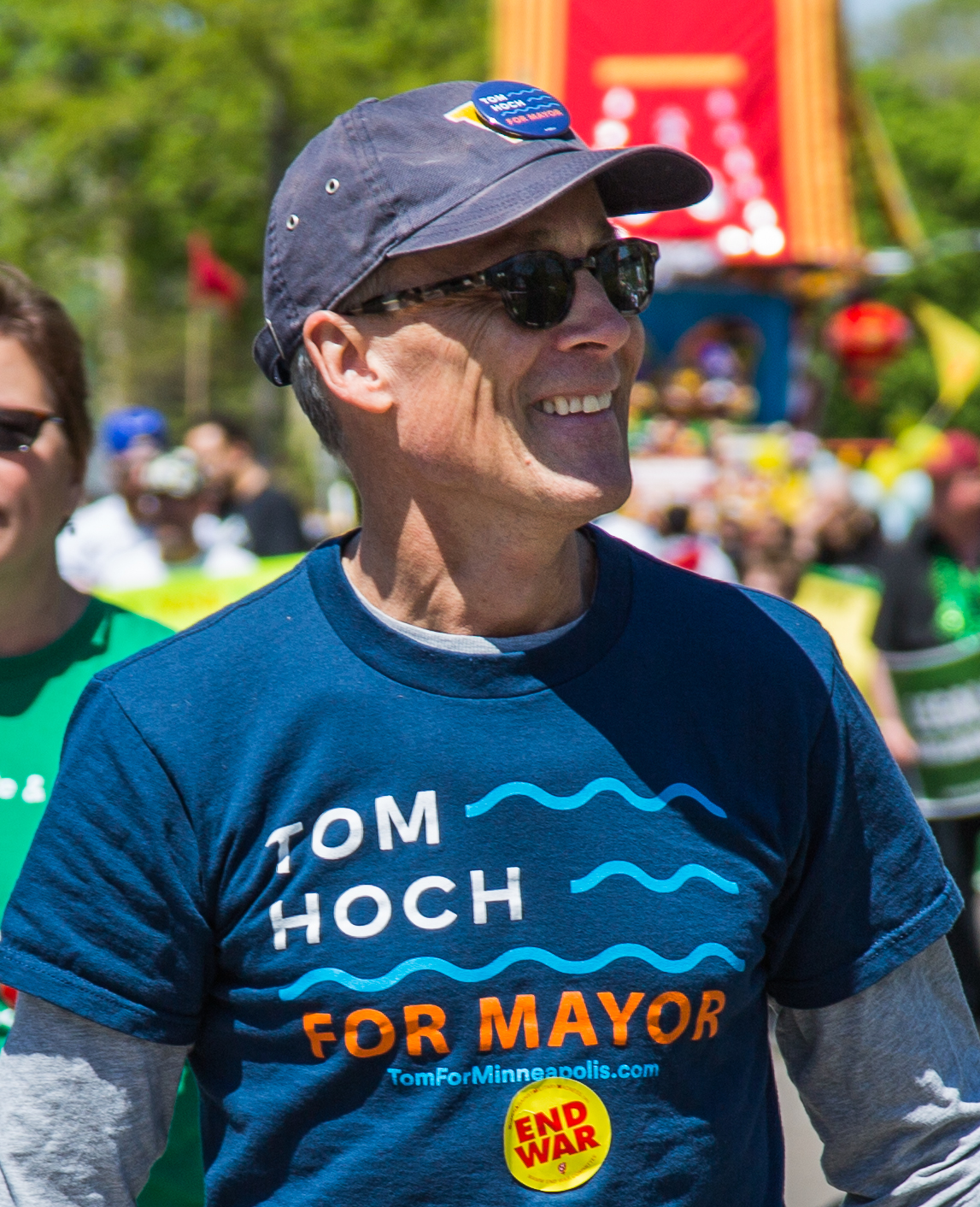

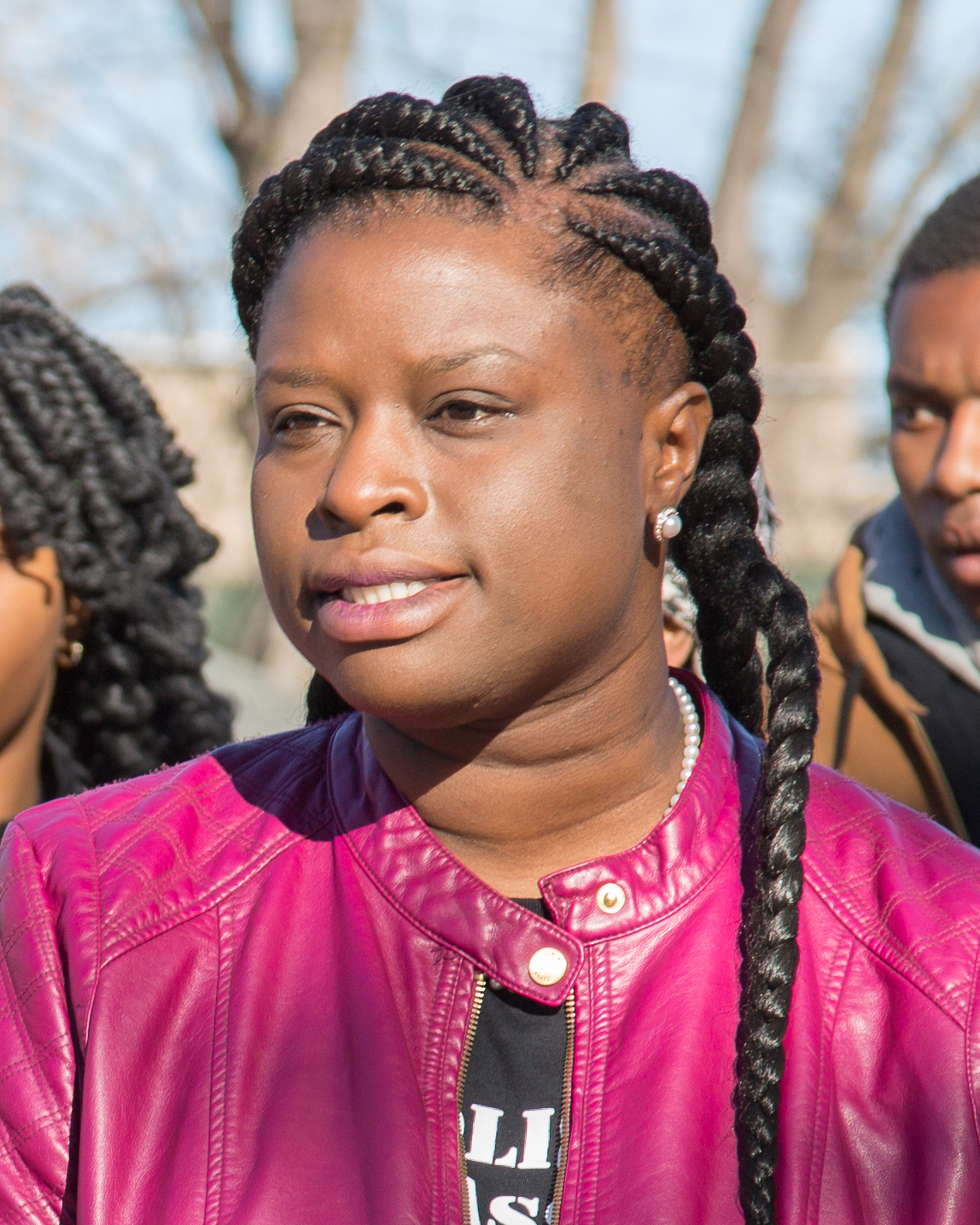
Candidate	Jacob Frey	Raymond Dehn	Betsy Hodges
Party	Democratic (DFL)	Democratic (DFL)	Democratic (DFL)
First round	26,116; 24.98%	18,101; 17.32%	18,915; 18.09%
Final round	46,716; 57.21%	34,791; 42.79%	Eliminated
Candidate	Tom Hoch	Nekima Levy-Pounds
Party	Democratic (DFL)	Democratic (DFL)
First round	20,125; 19.25%	15,716; 15.03%
Final round	Eliminated	Eliminated
- First preference votes by precinct Frey Dehn Hoch Hodges Levy-Pounds Tie
Mayor before election
Betsy Hodges
Democratic (DFL)
Elected Mayor
Jacob Frey
Democratic (DFL)

The 2017 Minneapolis mayoral election was held on November 7, 2017, to elect the mayor of Minneapolis. This was the third mayoral election in the city's history to use ranked-choice voting. Municipal elections in Minnesota are nonpartisan, although candidates were able to identify with a political party on the ballot.

No candidate achieved a majority in the first round of ballot counting on election night. Jacob Frey was declared the winner the next day after several rounds of vote tabulations.

== Background ==
=== 2013 election ===
Betsy Hodges was elected mayor of Minneapolis on November 5, 2013, out of a field of 35 candidates, with her term beginning on January 2, 2014. In response to the large candidate field, the Minneapolis Charter Commission approved a referendum increasing the filing fee from $20 to $500. The proposal was approved by voters on November 4, 2014.

=== Campaign ===
In a blog letter dated November 7, 2016, a housing activist and longtime Minneapolis resident known as Captain Jack Sparrow announced his candidacy for mayor in the 2017 election; this was his third election campaign for office in the past six years. Nekima Levy-Pounds, an attorney, civil rights activist, and former president of the Minneapolis NAACP, was one of the first candidates to begin their campaign, with an announcement on November 14, 2016. Hodges announced her re-election campaign on December 15, 2016. City Council member Jacob Frey and filmmaker Aswar Rahman entered in early January, while State Representative Raymond Dehn and theatre executive Tom Hoch announced their campaigns in February. David John Wilson, an active member of the Democratic Farmer-Labor (DFL) party, entered the race during the candidate filing period in August 2017, but he declined to identify by party affiliation in favor of the stated principle "Rainbows Butterflies Unicorns". Ian Simpson ran under the platform of the Idea Party, which asks the citizens of Minneapolis to pitch in their own creative solutions for change.

Formal candidate filing began on August 1, 2017. Political parties held caucuses and conventions in the spring and summer, deciding whether to endorse a candidate for election. The DFL did not endorse a Minneapolis mayoral candidate at its July 2017 convention.

On October 27, the Star Tribune editorial staff endorsed Jacob Frey for mayor. This was followed by an endorsement of Frey by the Minnesota Daily on October 30.

== Candidates ==
=== Democratic-Farmer-Labor ===
- Raymond Dehn, State Representative (District 59B)
- Al Flowers, community activist
- Jacob Frey, City Council member (Third Ward)
- Tom Hoch, former president of the Hennepin Theatre Trust, former deputy executive director of the Minneapolis Public Housing Authority
- Betsy Hodges, incumbent mayor
- Gregg Iverson, retired employee of Minnesota Department of Transportation
- Nekima Levy-Pounds, civil rights activist, former president of the Minneapolis NAACP, founding director of the Community Justice Project at the University of St. Thomas law school
- Jeffrey Sterling Olson
- Aswar Rahman, filmmaker, businessman
  - Suspended campaign on November 2, 2017, and subsequently endorsed Jacob Frey.

=== Independent ===
- L.A. Nik, author and podcast host

=== Farmer Labor ===
- Troy Benjegerdes

=== Basic Income Guarantee ===
- Captain Jack Sparrow, urban housing and Occupy movement activist

=== Socialist Workers Party ===
- David Rosenfeld

=== Libertarian ===
- Charlie Gers

=== Rainbows Butterflies Unicorns ===
- David John Wilson

=== The Idea Party ===
- Ian Simpson

=== Gallery ===
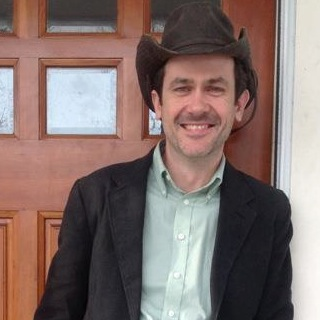
Troy Benjegerdes

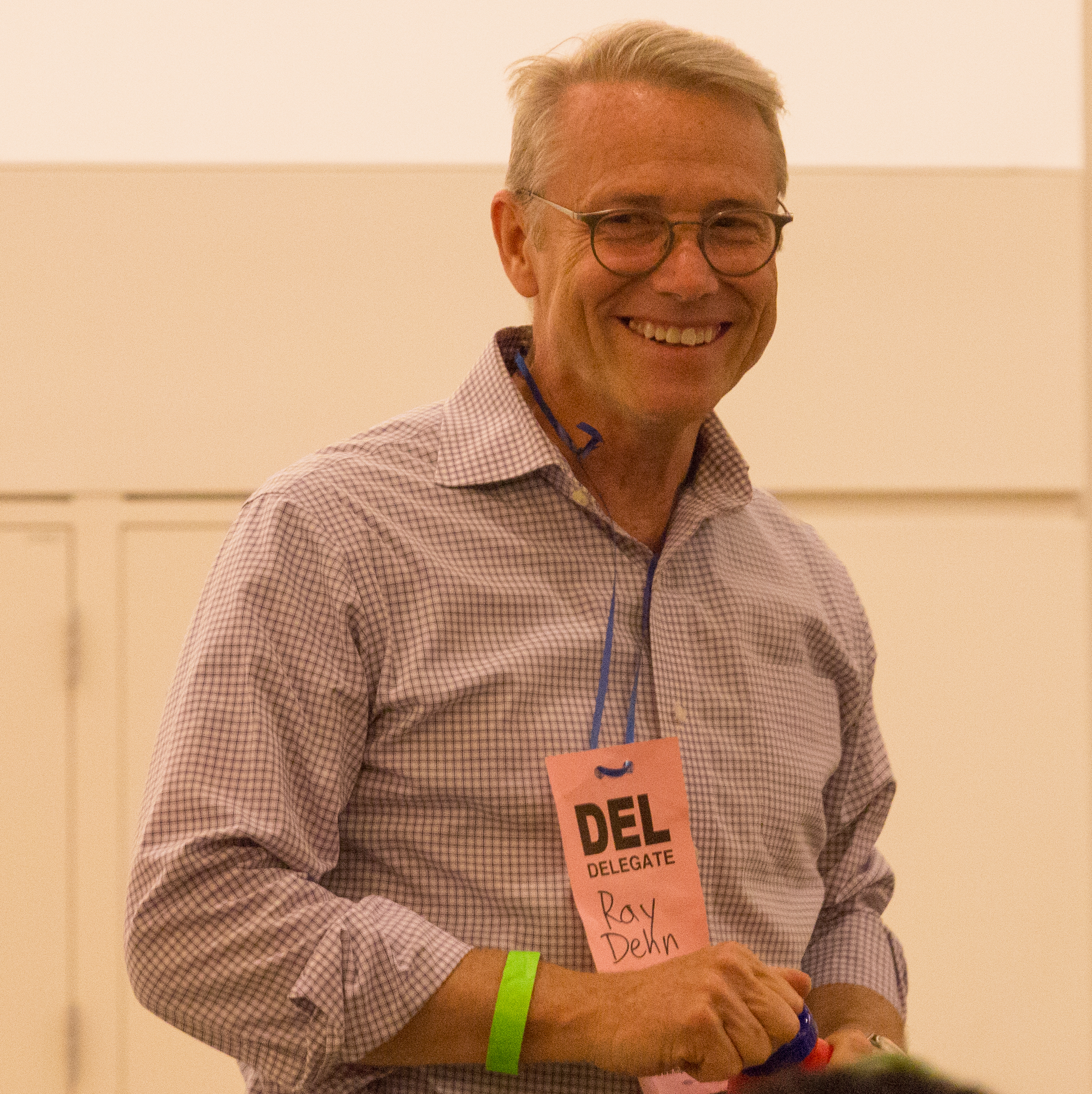
Raymond Dehn

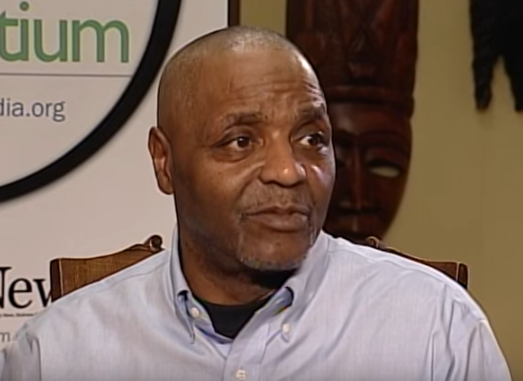
Al Flowers

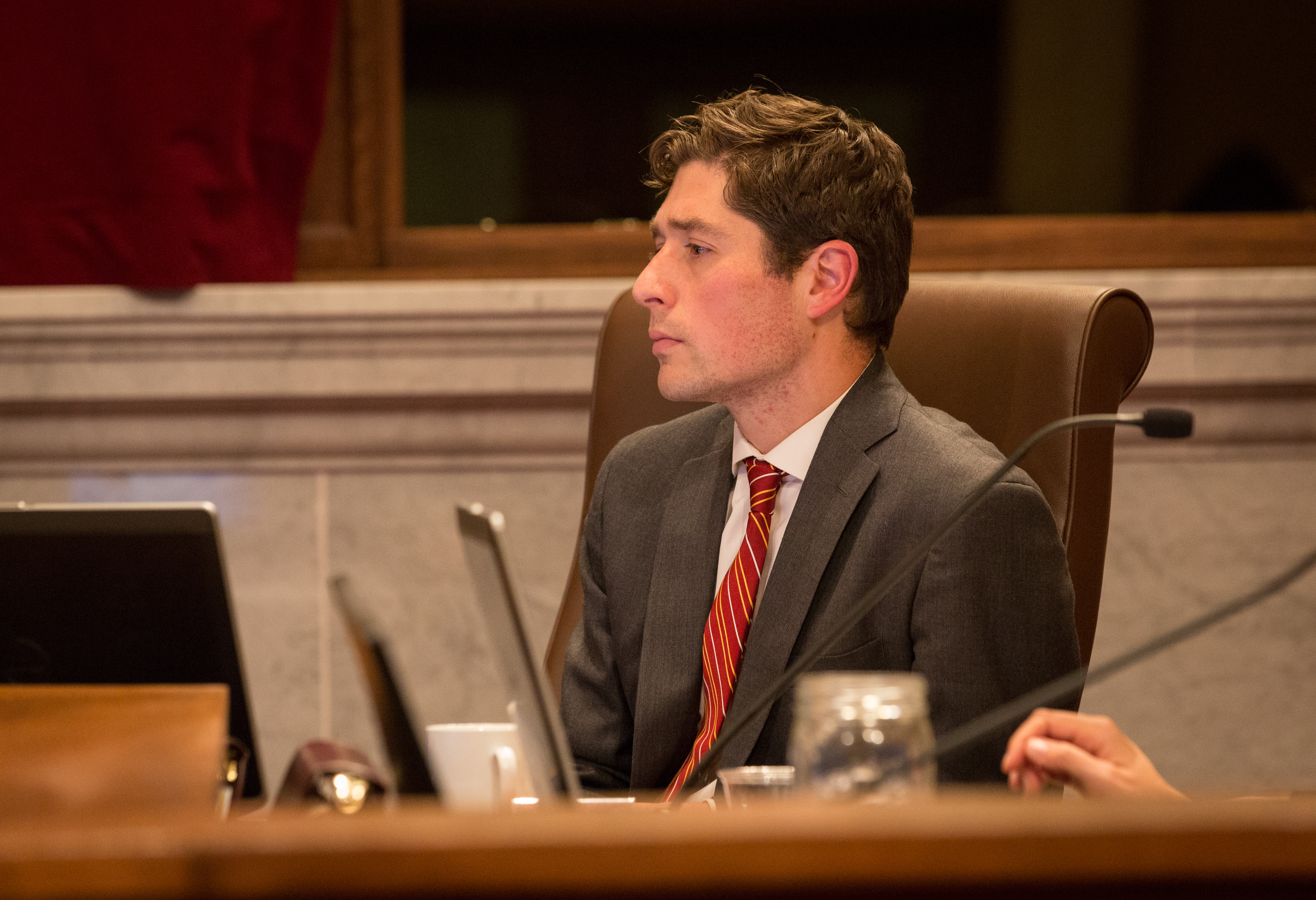
Jacob Frey

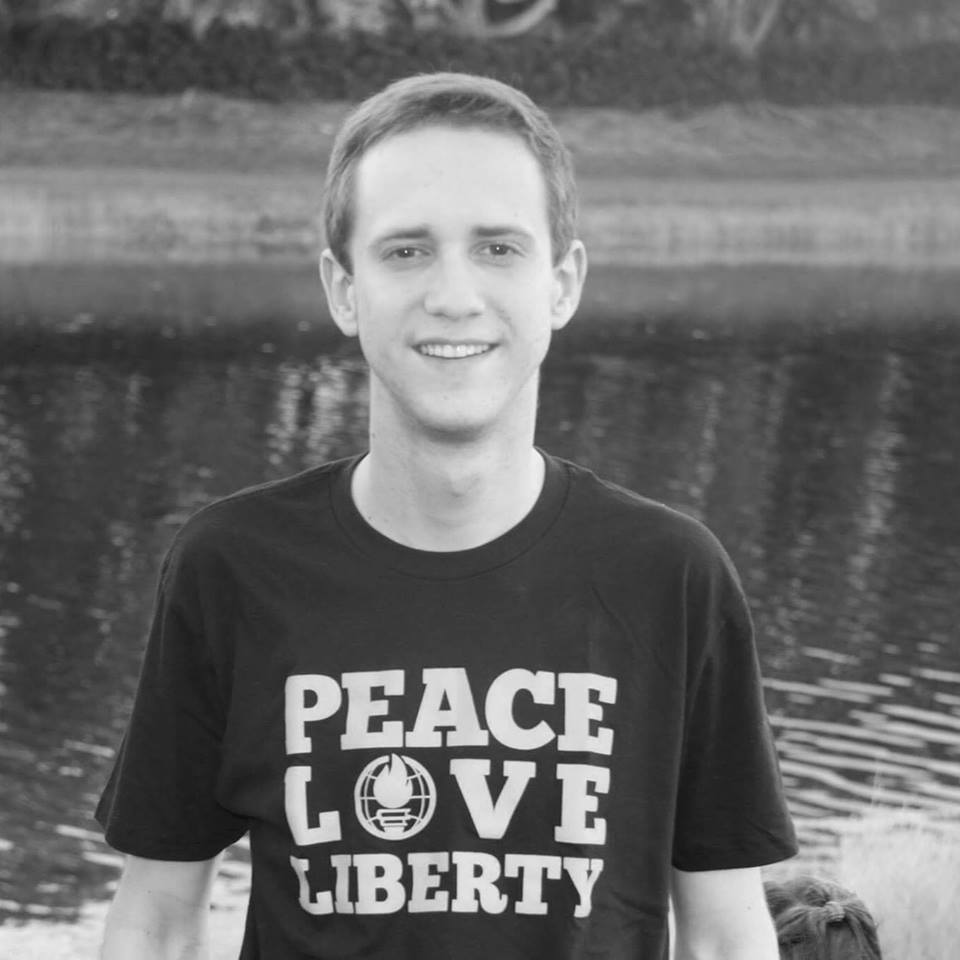
Charlie Gers

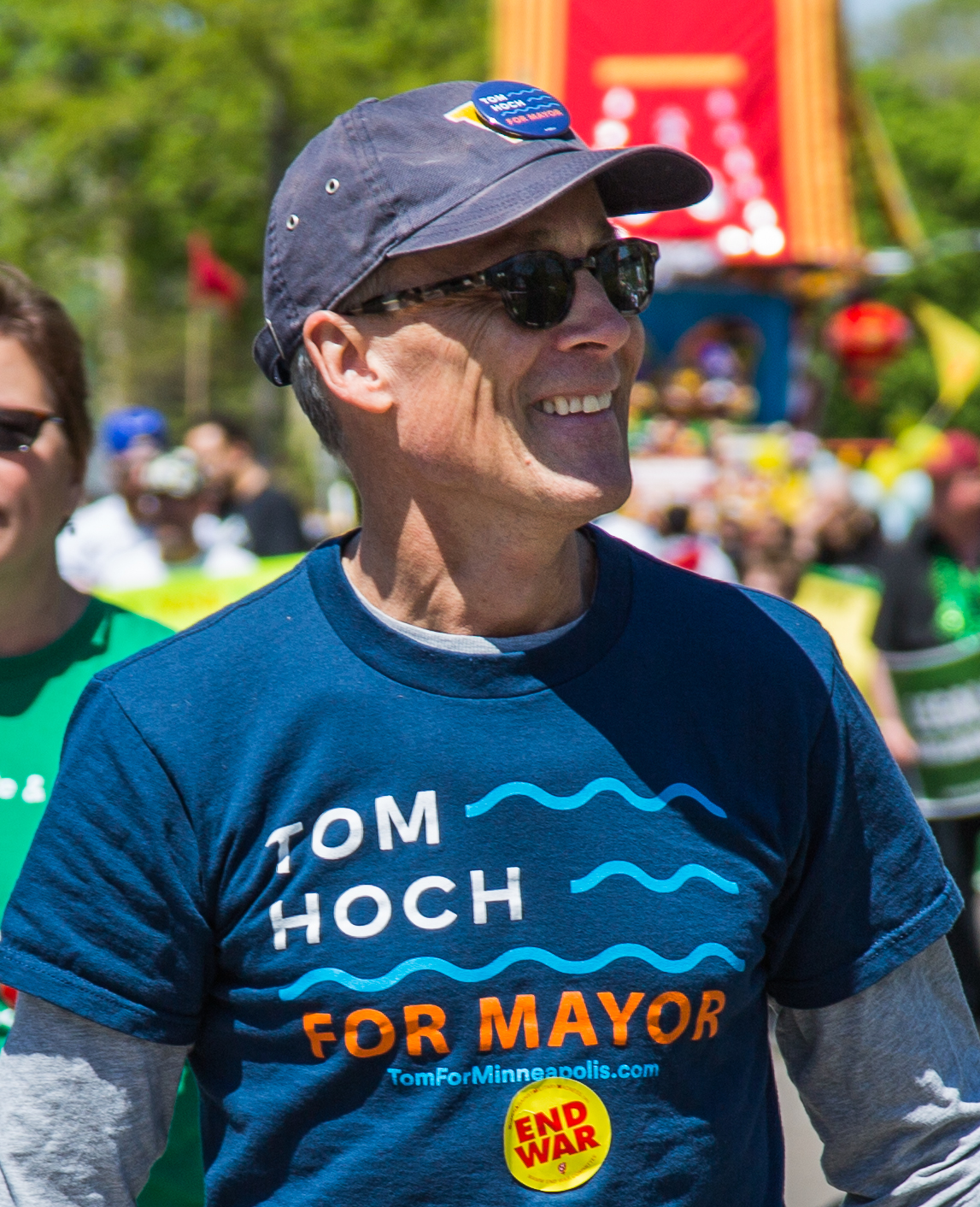
Tom Hoch

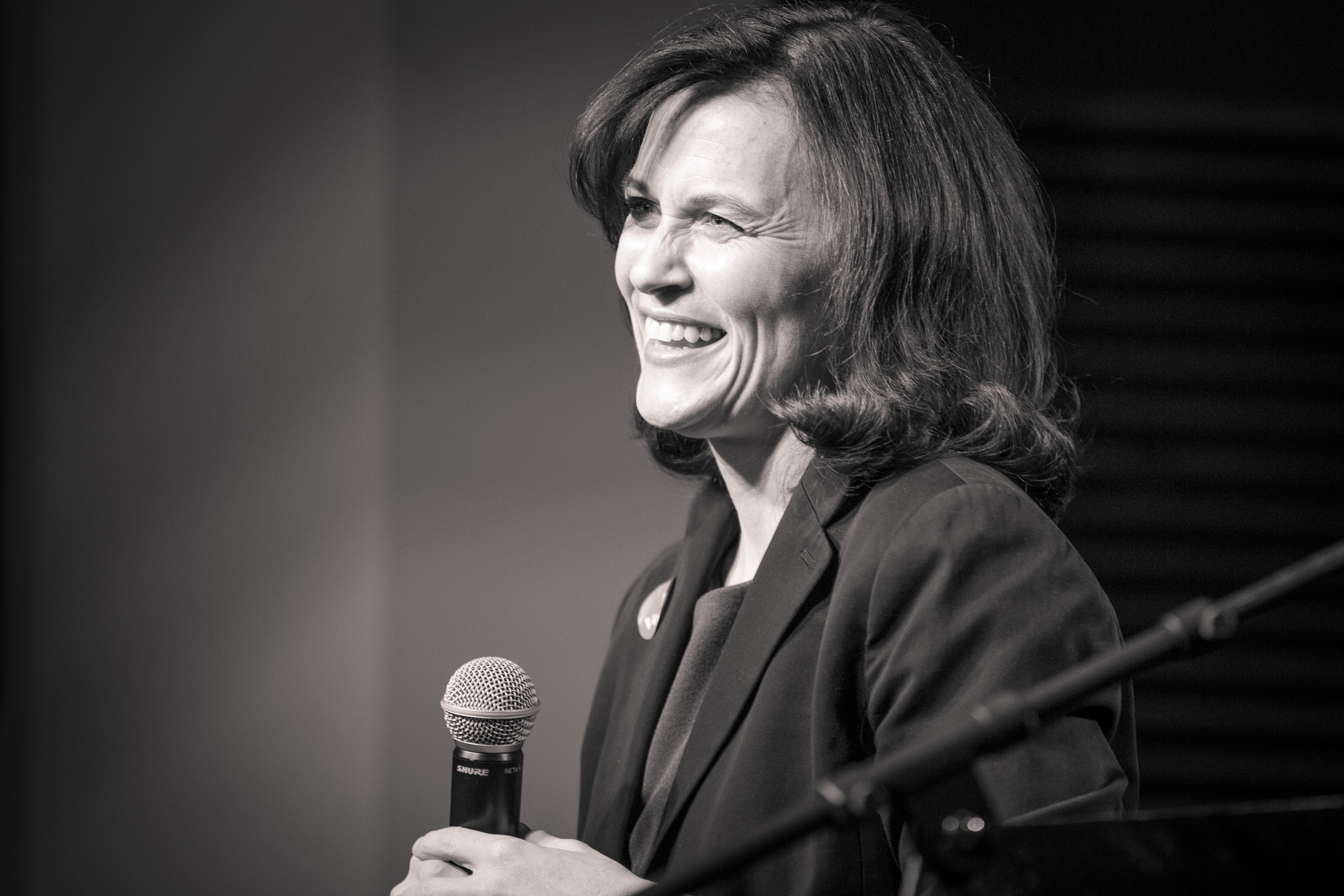
Betsy Hodges

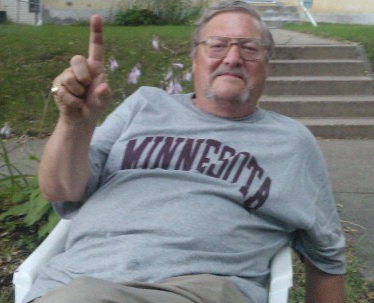
Gregg Iverson

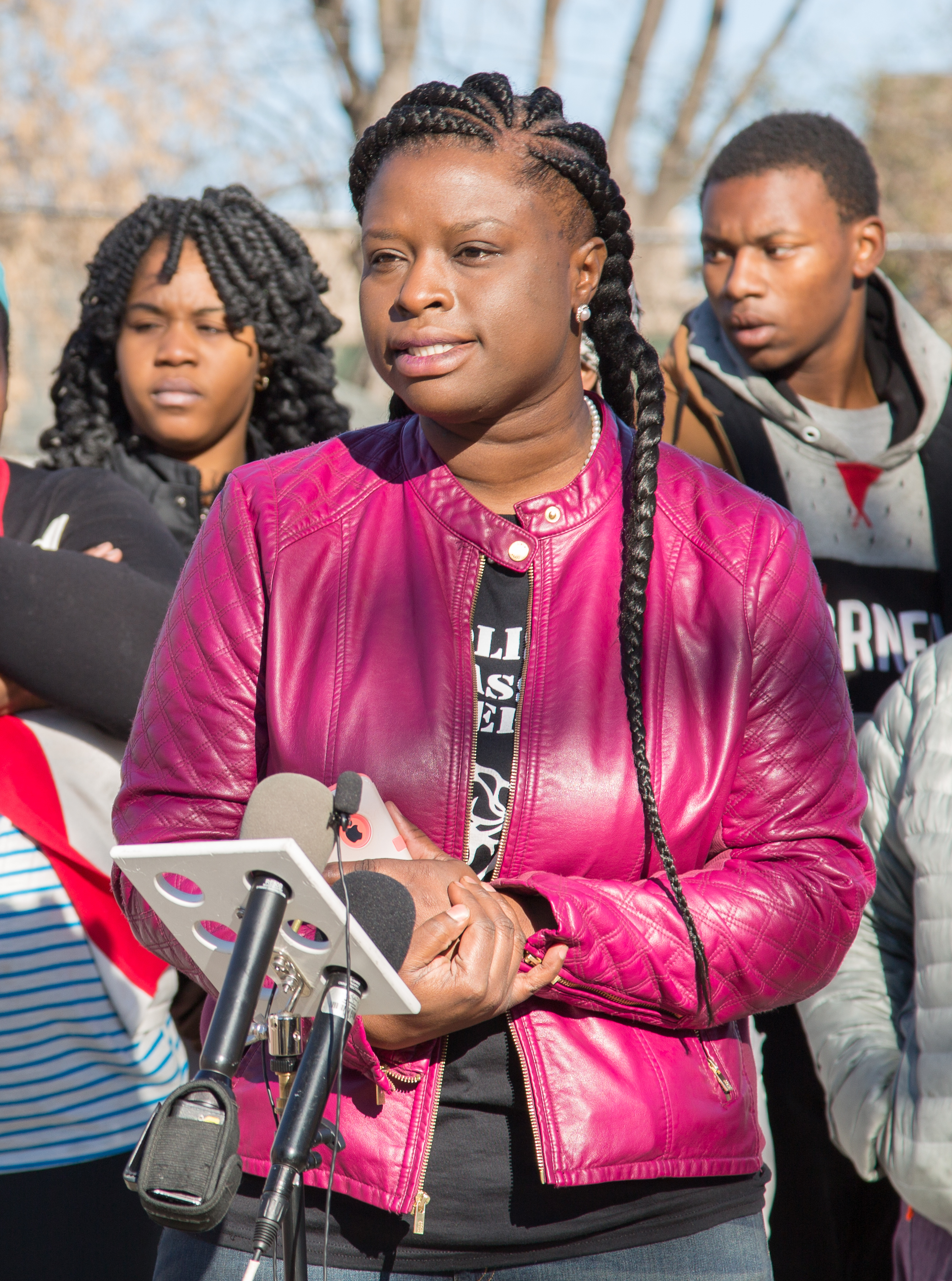
Nekima Levy-Pounds

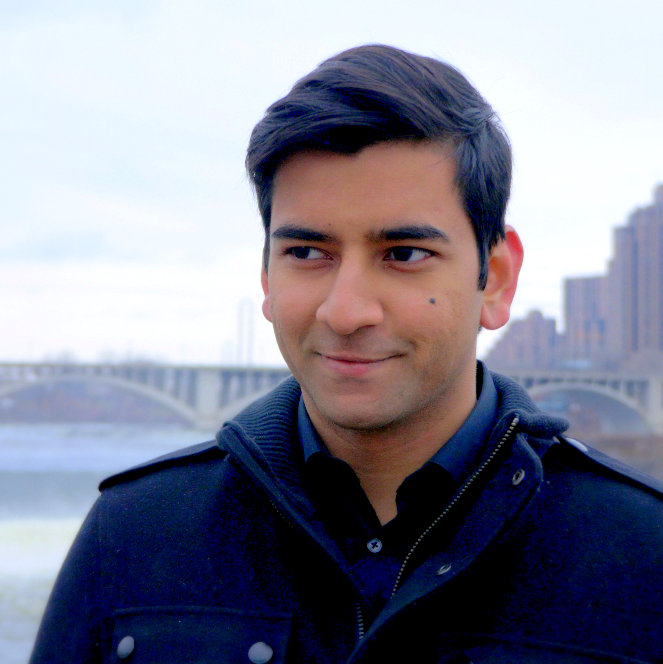
Aswar Rahman

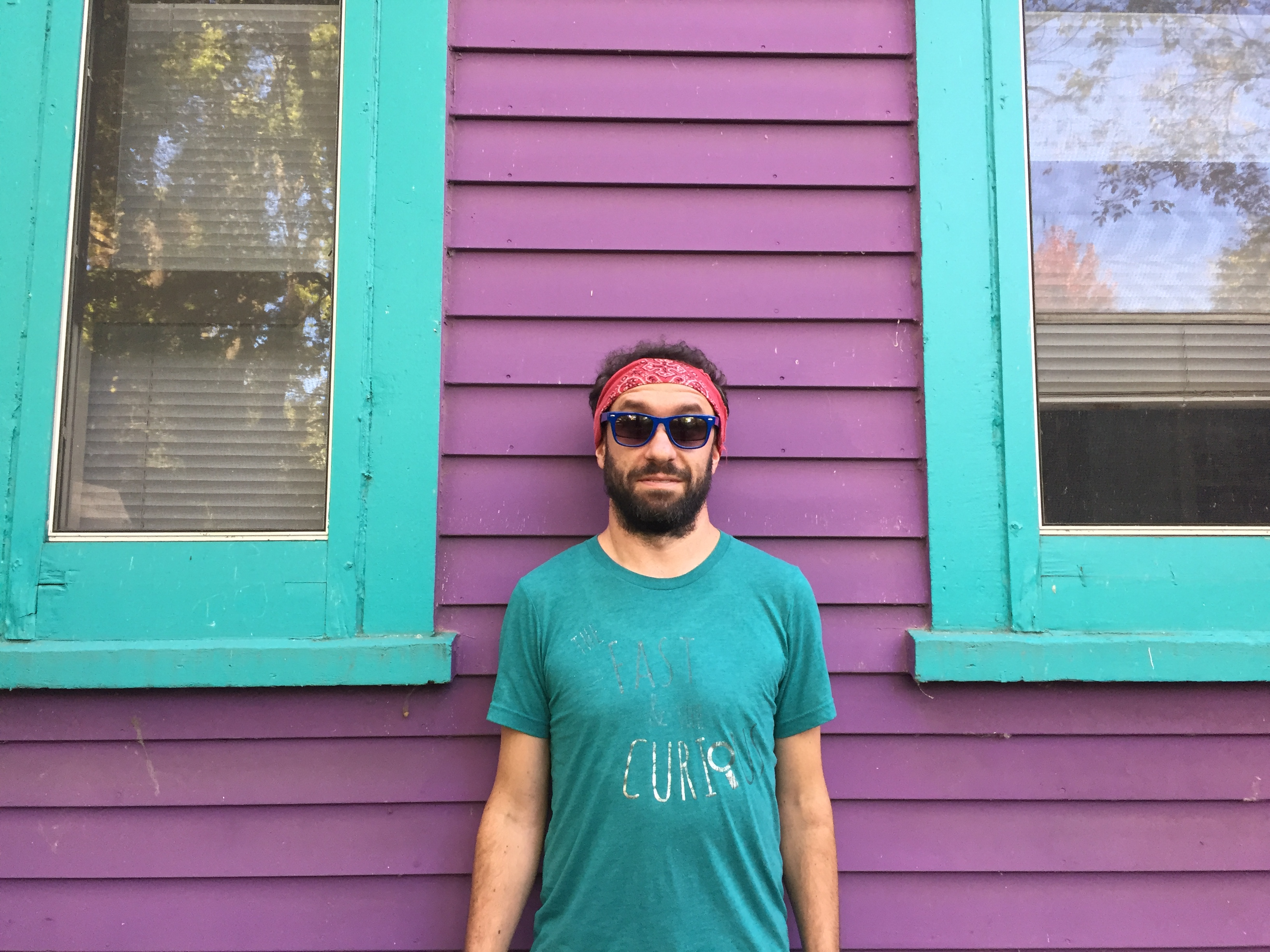
Ian Simpson

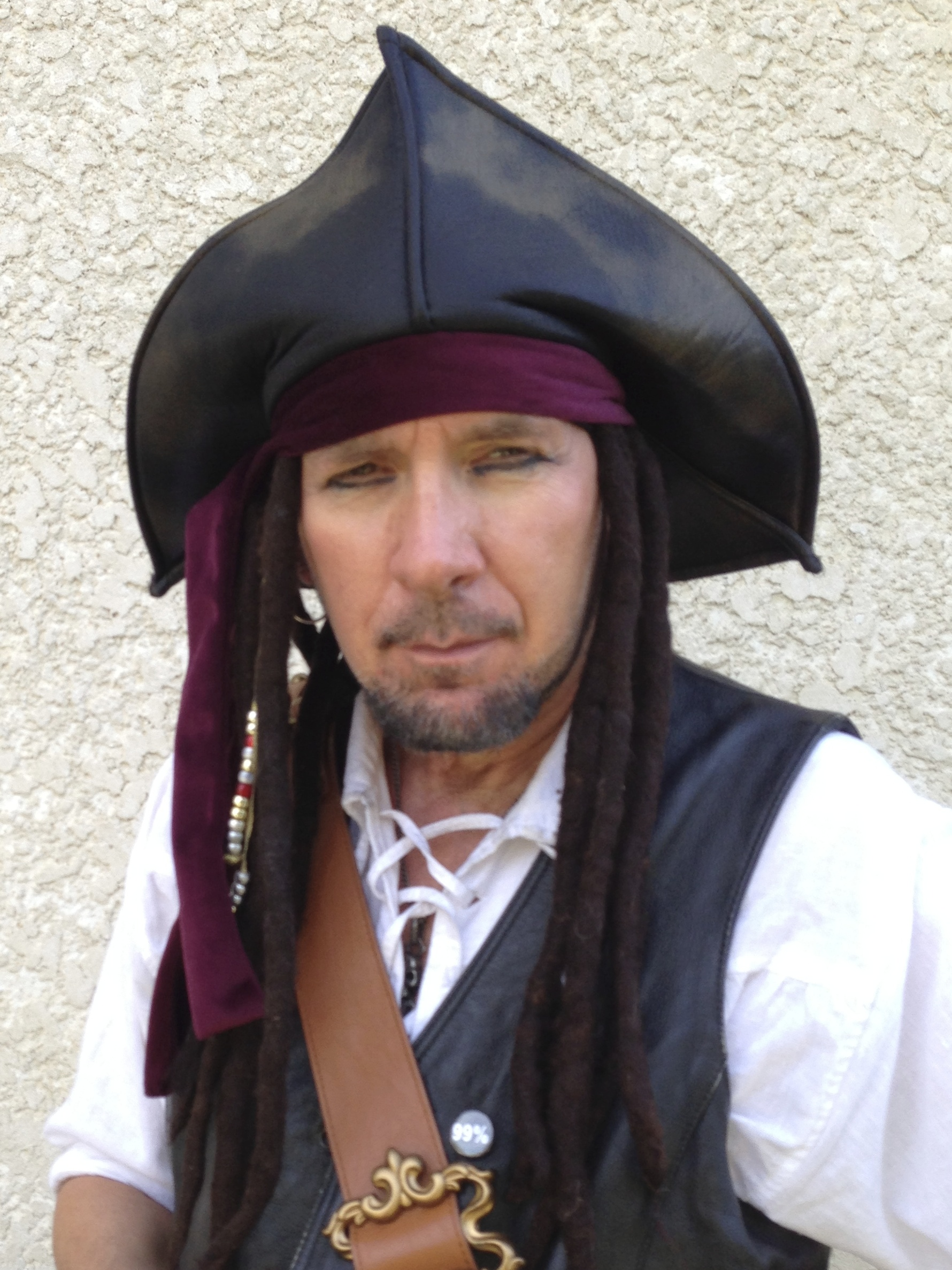
Captain Jack Sparrow

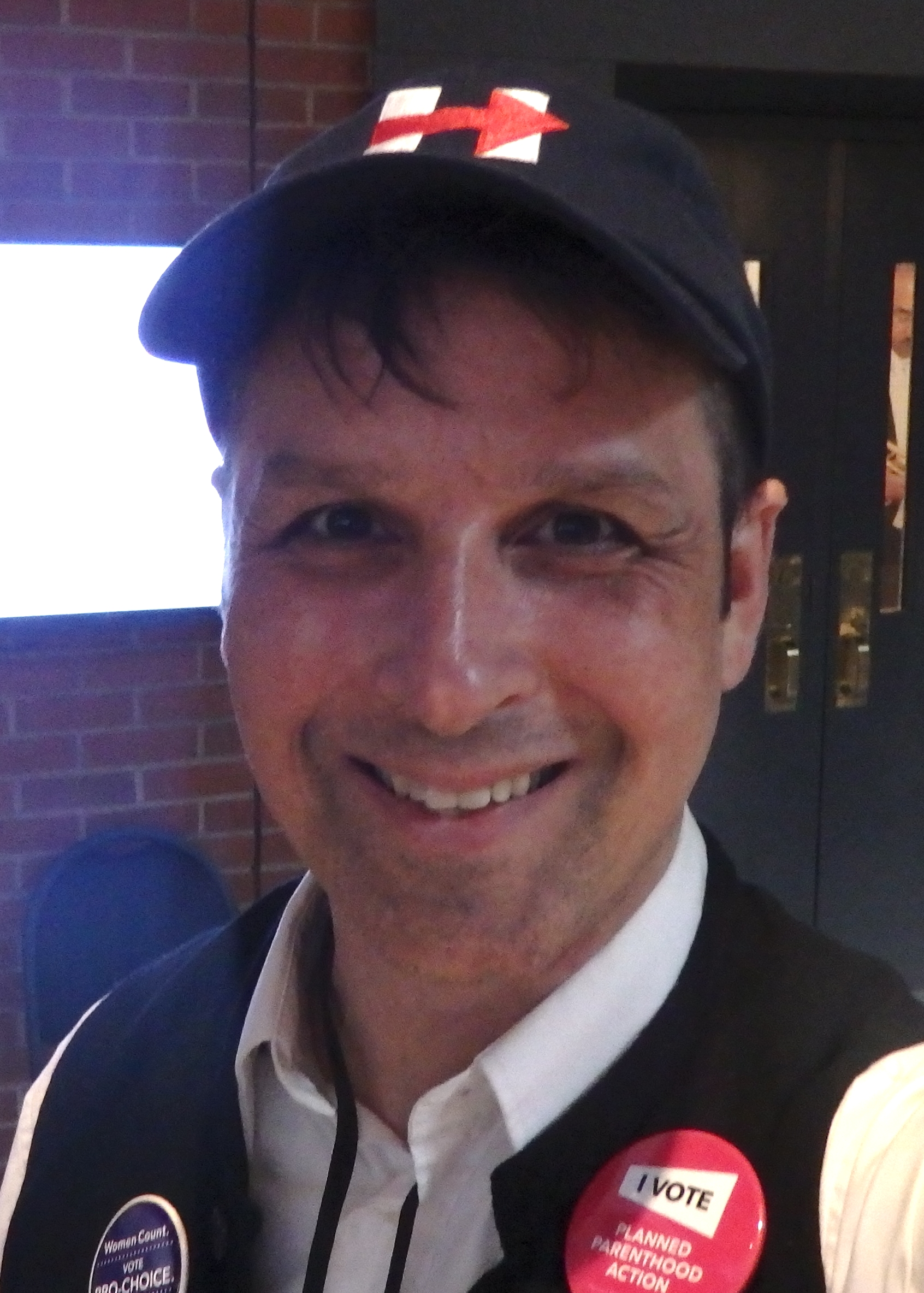
David John Wilson "Dave Unicorn"
- Not pictured: Jeffrey Sterling Olson, David Rosenfeld, L.A. Nik

== Results ==
No candidate achieved a majority in the first round on election night. Several rounds of vote transfers were necessary to determine a winner, a process which did not start until the next day.

Candidates whose total votes in all ranked positions are less than the highest votes in first rank are immediately eliminated. In 2017 five candidates remained for the sequential elimination process.

Votes by ranking of candidates above 2%
Candidate/votes by rank	1	2	3	Total
Jacob Frey	24.97%	19.90%	14.39%	59.26%
Tom Hoch	19.27%	18.67%	13.22%	51.16%
Betsy Hodges	18.08%	16.57%	21.57%	56.22%
Raymond Dehn	17.34%	16.51%	14.04%	47.89%
Nekima Levy-Pounds	15.06%	17.43%	16.31%	48.80%
Other or none	5.28%	10.92%	20.47%	

With four rounds of elimination, Jacob Frey was announced as the winner on Wednesday, November 8, at 2 pm, 18 hours after the polls closed.

Runoff round tabulation
Candidate	Round 1		Round 2			Round 3			Round 4			Round 5		
Candidate	votes (% of active)		transfer	votes (% of active)		transfer	votes (% of active)		transfer	votes (% of active)		transfer	votes (% of active)	
Jacob Frey	26,116	25.0%	+634	26,750	26.3%	+2,730	29,480	29.5%	+9,888	39,368	42.1%	+7,348	46,716	57.2%
Raymond Dehn	18,101	17.3%	+473	18,574	18.2%	+5,454	24,028	24.1%	+3,330	27,358	29.2%	+7,613	34,971	42.8%
Betsy Hodges (incumbent)	18,915	18.1%	+552	19,467	19.1%	+4,044	23,511	23.6%	+3,364	26,875	28.7%	−26,875		
Tom Hoch	20,125	19.3%	+787	20,912	20.5%	+1,842	22,754	22.8%	−22,754					
Nekima Levy-Pounds	15,716	15.0%	+473	16,189	15.9%	−16,189								
Charlie Gers	1,233	1.2%	−1,233											
Aswar Rahman	756	0.7%	−756											
Al Flowers	711	0.7%	−711											
L.A. Nik	612	0.6%	−612											
David Rosenfeld	477	0.5%	−477											
Captain Jack Sparrow	438	0.4%	−438											
Gregg A. Iverson	335	0.3%	−335											
Ronald Lischeid	325	0.3%	−325											
David John Wilson	220	0.2%	−220											
Troy Benjegerdes	184	0.2%	−184											
Undeclared Write-ins	138	0.1%	−138											
Ian Simpson	119	0.1%	−119											
Christopher Robin Zimmerman	1	0.0%	−1											
Theron Preston Washington	0	0.0%	0											
Active ballots (% of Valid)	104,522	100%		101,892	97.5%		99,773	95.5%		93,601	89.6%		81,687	78.2%
Exhausted ballots (% of Valid)	0	0.0%	+2,630	2,630	2.5%	+2,119	4,749	4.5%	+6,172	10,921	10.4%	+11,914	22,835	21.8%
Total valid ballots	104,522			104,522			104,522			104,522			104,522	

- Turnout: 105,928
- Undervotes: 1,406 (1.3%)
- Valid ballots: 104,522

Source: Minneapolis Elections & Voter Services

== See also ==
- Minneapolis City Council election, 2017
- Minneapolis municipal election, 2017
