= Nekima Levy Armstrong =

American lawyer and activist (born 1976)

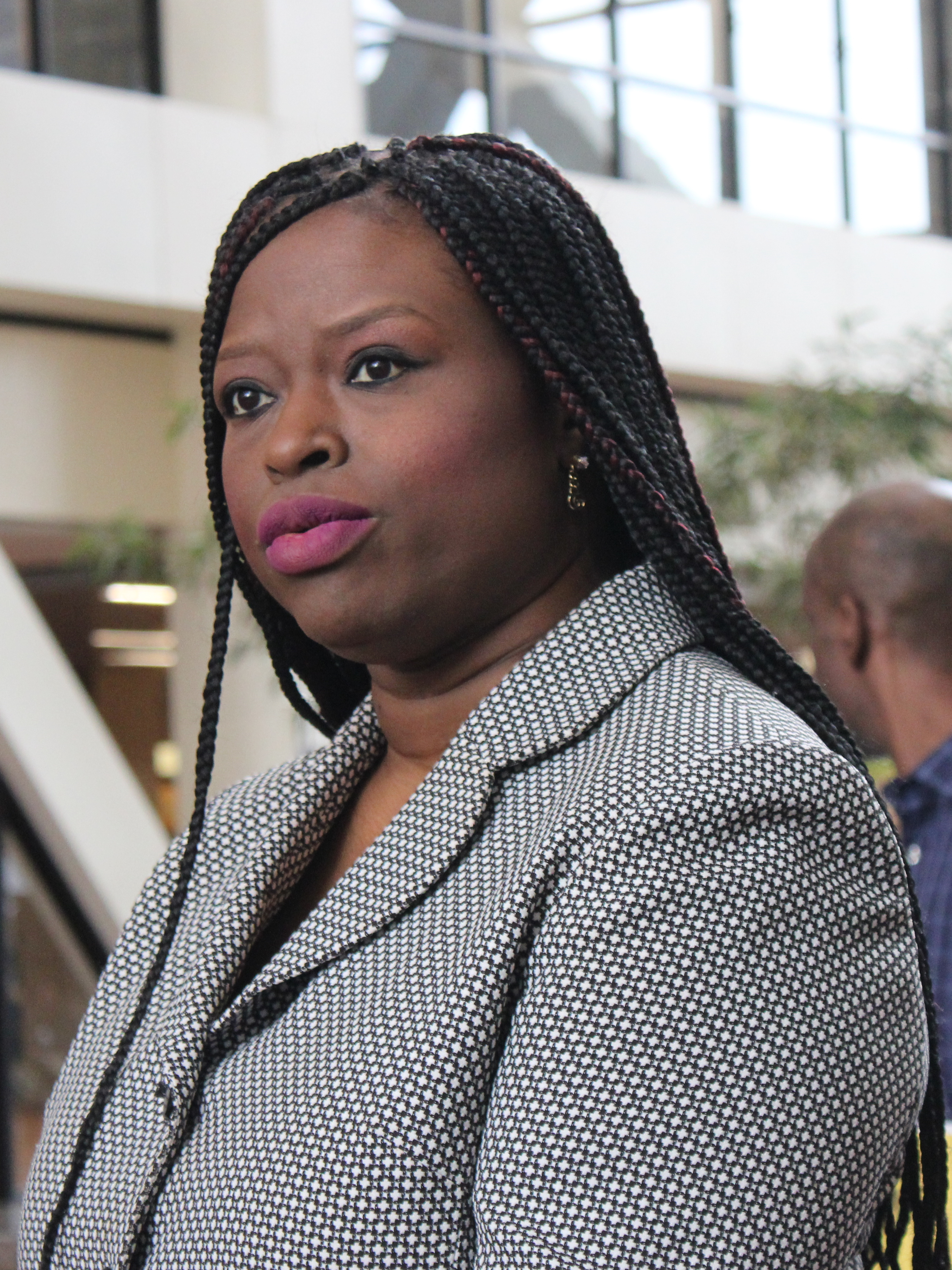
- Levy Armstrong in 2026
- Born: Nekima Levy-Pounds; June 27, 1976 (age 50); Jackson, Mississippi, U.S.
- Education: University of Southern California (BA); University of Illinois (JD)
- Occupation: Attorney
- Children: 5

Nekima Valdez Levy Armstrong (née Levy-Pounds, born June 27, 1976) is an American lawyer and social justice activist. She was president of the Minneapolis chapter of the NAACP from 2015 to 2016. She has led a variety of organizations that focus on issues of racial equality and disparity in the Minneapolis–Saint Paul area.

Levy Armstrong was a professor of law at the University of St. Thomas in Minneapolis from 2003 to 2016. After concluding her term as an NAACP chapter president and leaving her academic post, she campaigned unsuccessfully for mayor of Minneapolis in the 2017 election. She has been a prominent local activist in several protests over the killing of black Americans by police officers. She has been involved in lawsuits to prevent Minneapolis from eliminating single-family zoning, arguing that doing so would harm the environment and communities of color.

== Early life and education ==
Levy Armstrong was born on June 27, 1976, in Jackson, Mississippi, the eldest sister of five. She moved to South Central Los Angeles after spending the first eight years of her life in Mississippi, and at fourteen years old was accepted to attend the Brooks School of North Andover, Massachusetts, as a boarding student. She earned a Bachelor of Arts degree from the University of Southern California and a Juris Doctor degree from the University of Illinois College of Law. Levy Armstrong lived in Los Angeles until 2003 when she moved to the U.S. state of Minnesota.

== Career ==
=== Professorship and community projects ===
Levy Armstrong began as an associate law professor at the University of St. Thomas in 2003. She later attained tenure at the university and was granted full professorship in 2013. In 2006, Levy Armstrong founded the Community Justice Project, a partnership between the University of St. Thomas School of Law and the Saint Paul chapter of the NAACP, for law students interested in working with underserved communities.

In 2011, Levy Armstrong was the director of an African American history museum in South Minneapolis. The project garnered several large donations, loans from prominent community organizations like the Carl Pohlad Foundation, and the potential commitment of state bonding money. However, the project had financial difficulties that eventually led to its closure and the sale of its building at auction. Levy Armstrong co-founded Brotherhood Inc., an organization dedicated to helping young African American men stay away from gang activity and prison. She chairs the Minnesota State Advisory Committee to the United States Commission on Civil Rights and Everybody In, a nonprofit with the goal of closing race-based employment gaps in the Minneapolis–Saint Paul area.

=== Black Lives Matter movement ===
Levy Armstrong participated in the anti-police brutality protests in Ferguson, Missouri in mid 2014. She also took part in a Black Lives Matter protest of police brutality at the Mall of America in Bloomington, Minnesota in December 2014. She and ten other protesters were charged by the City of Bloomington with disorderly conduct and trespass which carried a maximum penalty of a fine up to $8,000 and a prison sentence of up to two years. Restitution charges for $40,000 against the protesters were later withdrawn by the city. In November 2015, a Hennepin County judge dismissed the charges against Levy Armstrong and the ten others charged by Bloomington.

=== Minneapolis NAACP presidency ===
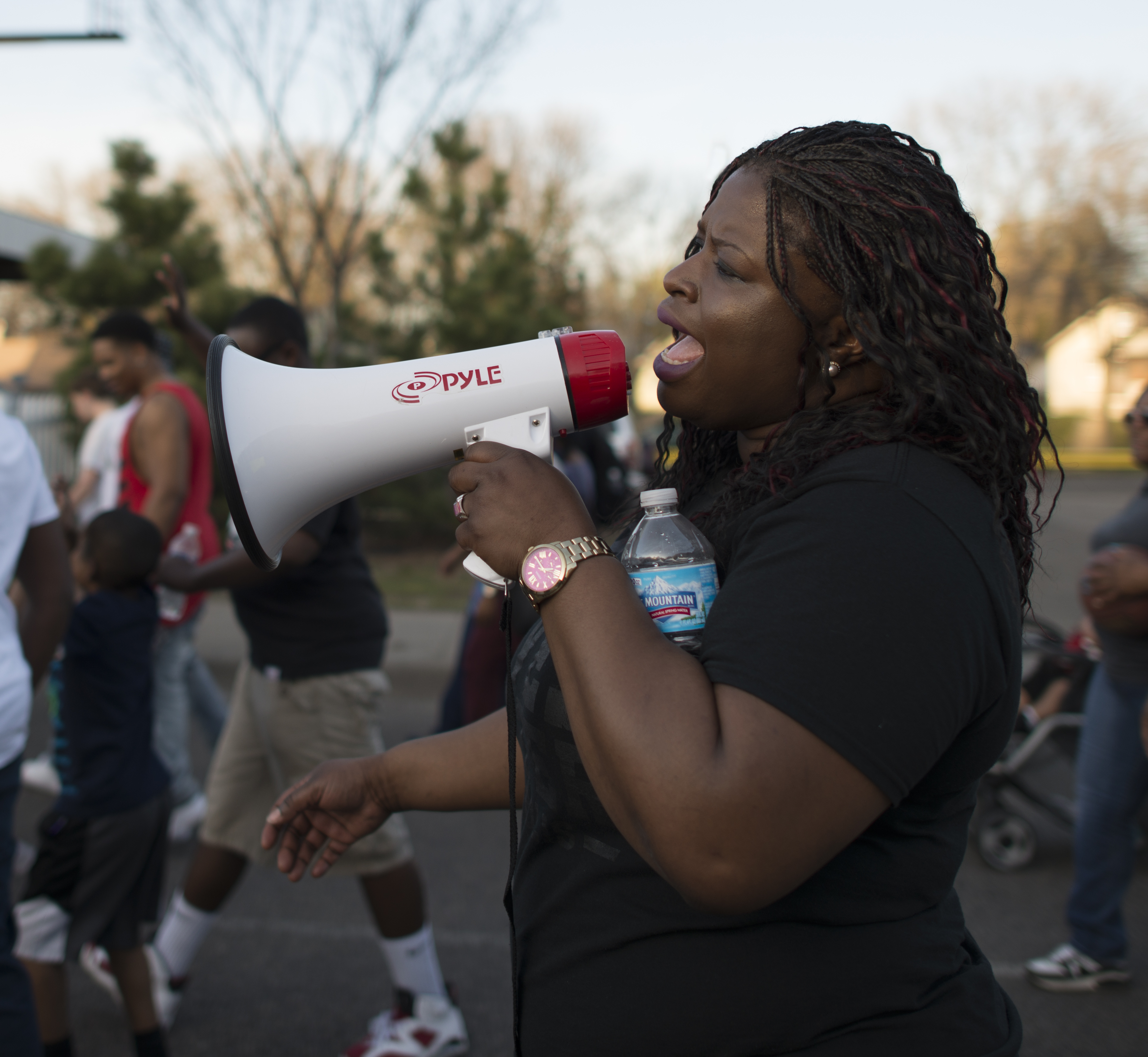
Levy Armstrong marching in 2015, protesting the shooting of Tania Harris

In 2015, Levy Armstrong became president of the Minneapolis chapter of the NAACP when outgoing president Jerry McAfee decided against seeking re-election. Though she won the election unopposed on the ballot, Levy Armstrong faced criticism from McAfee who contended that she was too focused on issues of police brutality to the neglect of concerns such as other violent crime against African Americans. Levy Armstrong stated that she hoped to increase youth engagement with the NAACP during her term with the organization. She has been critical of racial disparities in the Minneapolis–Saint Paul region, describing them as some of the nation's worst.

In November 2015, following the shooting death of Jamar Clark at the hands of Minneapolis police officers, Levy Armstrong was involved in a human blockade of Interstate 94. Of the approximately 40 protesters, Levy Armstrong was among the first arrested. She led some subsequent protests against Clark's killing. Levy Armstrong left her professorship with University of St. Thomas in 2016 to devote herself full-time to addressing issues of economic and racial justice. She announced in October of that year that she did not intend to seek a second term as president of the Minneapolis NAACP, but that she "plan[s] to have an even more visible presence in the community". Her successor at the chapter, Jason Sole, credited Levy Armstrong for aligning the more policy- and paperwork-oriented organization with the Black Lives Matter movement.

=== Mayoral campaign ===
A year after the death of Jamar Clark, Levy Armstrong announced her intention to run for mayor of Minneapolis in the city's 2017 election as a member of the Minnesota Democratic–Farmer–Labor Party. The announcement was held outside Minneapolis's fourth precinct police station, where protesters had demonstrated against Clark's killing for 18 days the year before. Levy Armstrong faced incumbent mayor Betsy Hodges, also a member of the Democratic–Farmer–Labor, and several other candidates. Although running as a member of the Democratic–Farmer–Labor, Armstrong opted to forego the party nomination process, citing what she described as the "confusing and unwelcoming" nature of the party's caucuses and convention. She lost to Jacob Frey in the November 2017 election, coming in fifth overall.

=== Community activism ===
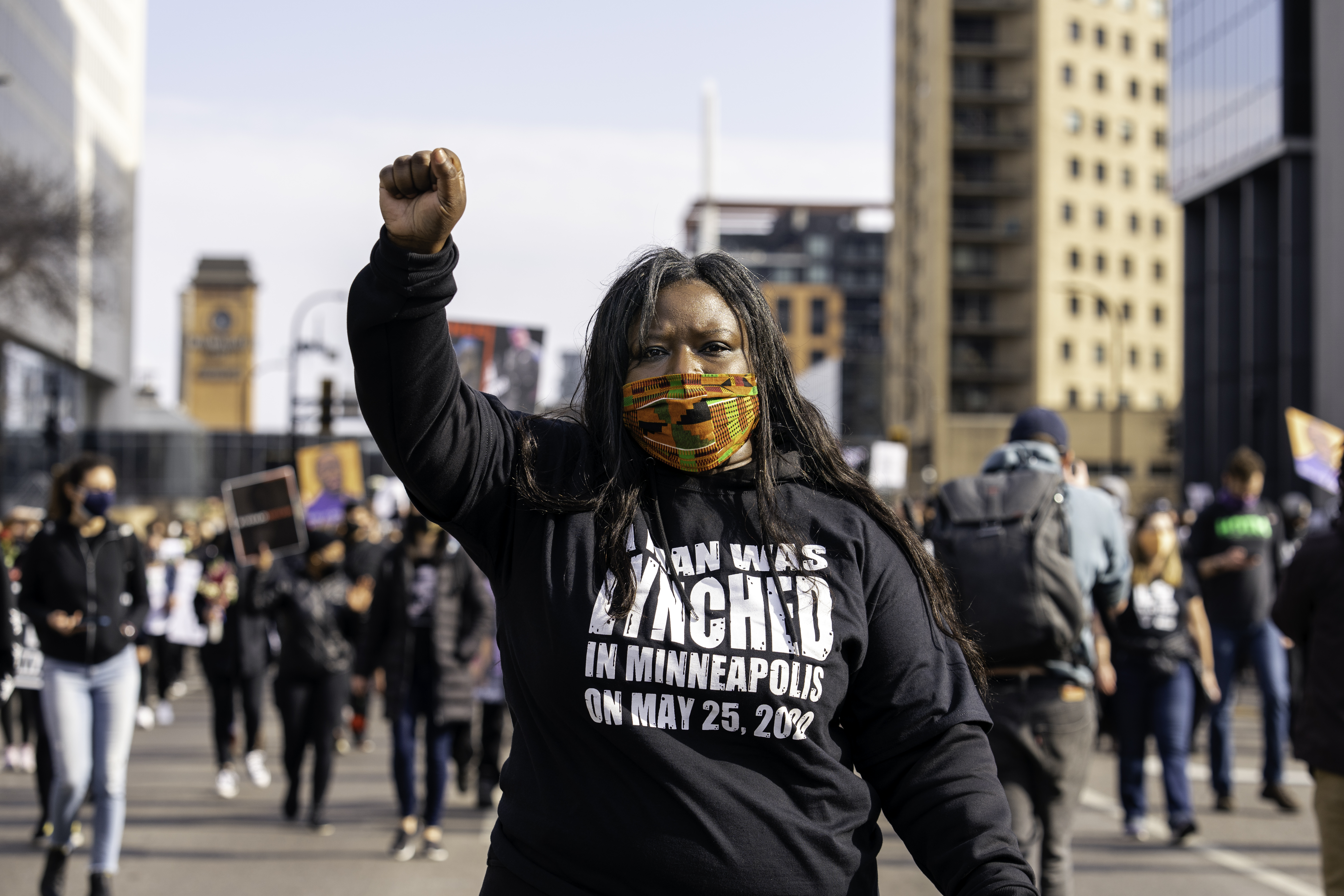
Levy Armstrong protesting against the murder of George Floyd in March 2021

In 2020, Levy Armstrong participated in local protests over the murder of George Floyd, an unarmed African-American man, by a white Minneapolis police officer. She was present when police officers fired tear gas on protesters without warning at the Minneapolis third police precinct station the afternoon of May 26 as a separate, smaller group of demonstrators were throwing objects at officers. The incident resulted in Levy Armstrong being a named party in a U.S. District Court complaint filed by the American Civil Liberties Union of Minnesota over the right to peaceful protest.

Levy Armstong was critical of Minneapolis police union leader Bob Kroll, and participated in protests calling for his resignation. A 100-person protest group led by Levy Armstrong's Racial Justice Network that gathered outside Kroll's home in Hugo, Minnesota, on August 15, 2020, drew controversy. In addition to calling for Kroll's resignation, the group criticized Kroll's partner, WCCO television reporter Liz Collin, for having a conflict of interest in stories about police violence. Some protesters bashed piñata effigies of Kroll and Collin, which was condemned by local media members for being a symbolic display of violence against a woman journalist.

In 2023, Levy Armstrong was a member of the legal team that sued Minneapolis for its 2040 Plan which eliminated single-family zoning in Minneapolis in order to alleviate the housing shortage in Minneapolis and reduce sprawl. Levy Armstrong argued that eliminating single-family zoning would harm the environment and communities of color, saying "Residents of color already face significant barriers to home ownership, which would have been exacerbated under the plan as a result of reduced access to and availability of single family properties." After District County Judge Joseph Klein ruled in favor of the lawsuit, forcing Minneapolis to rescind its plan to eliminate single-family zoning, Levy Armstrong celebrated the decision as a "major victory."

=== Cities Church protest, arrest and manipulated photo ===
On January 18, 2026, Levy Armstrong co-organized a protest at Cities Church in Saint Paul. One of the church's pastors is allegedly employed by the Department of Homeland Security (DHS) as the Acting Field Director for Immigration and Customs Enforcement (ICE) in Minnesota. Federal authorities began an investigation for possible violations of federal law (including laws barring physical obstruction of houses of worship and laws prohibiting conspiring to interfere with the free practice of religion) in connection with the protest. She was arrested on January 22 by DHS and FBI agents for playing a key role in the anti-ICE demonstration which disrupted the service. The charges allege that Armstrong conspired to deprive the congregation of its First Amendment freedom to worship. After her arrest, the official White House Twitter account posted a digitally manipulated photo of Levy Armstrong with darker skin and showing her sobbing. When asked to comment on the manipulated image, Kaelan Dorr, deputy White House communications director, posted to X, "Enforcement of the law will continue. The memes will continue." Writer Meagan Day called it, an image borne of ‘resurgent political sadism’, where ‘people in power indulge in open cruelty’.

== Personal life ==
Levy Armstrong lived in Brooklyn Park, Minnesota, until September 2015 when she moved to north Minneapolis. She is married and has five children, two of whom are adopted. In the mid-2010s, she preached at Minneapolis's First Covenant Church every other month.
