= Betsy Hodges =

American politician (born 1969)

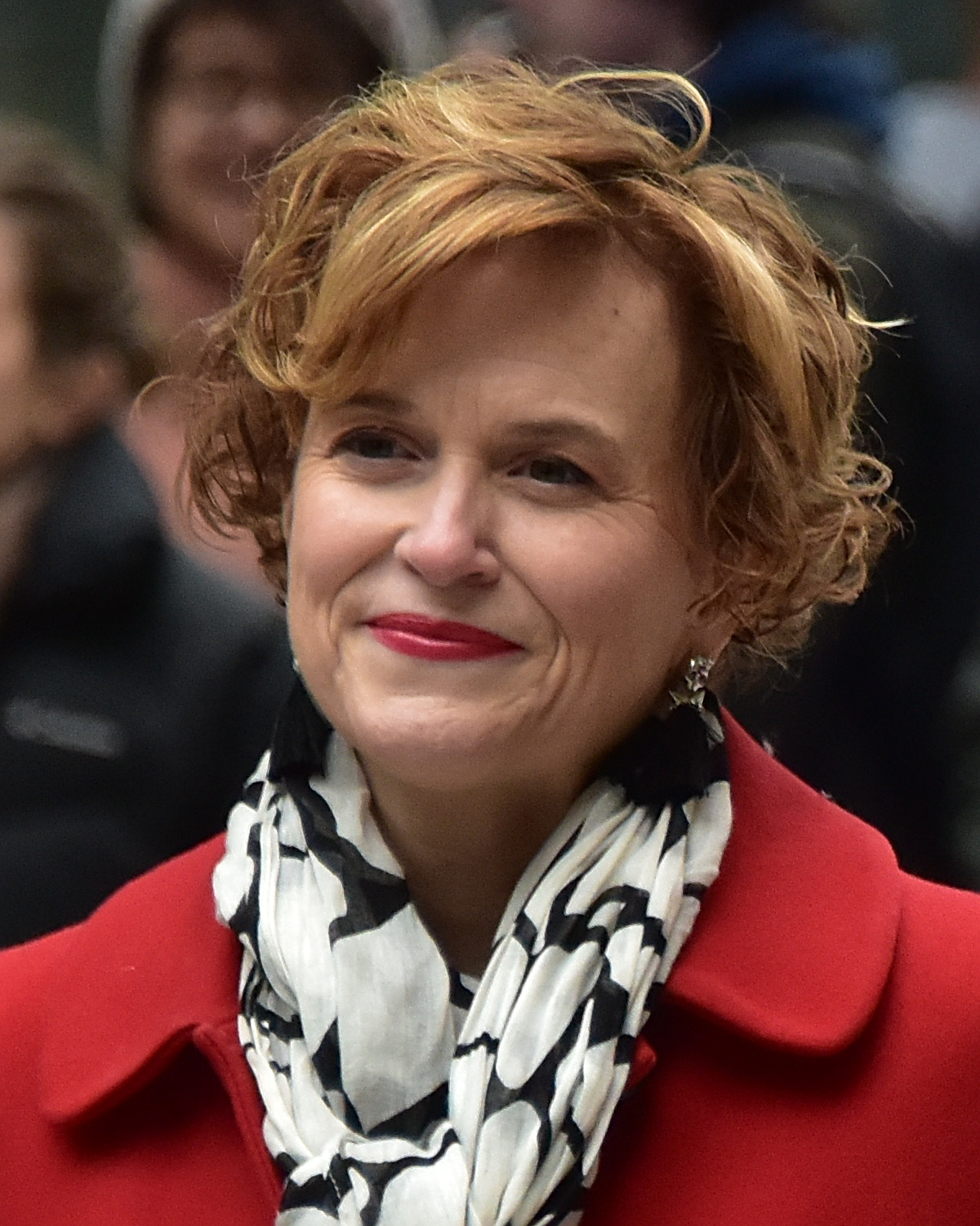
- Hodges in 2017

47th Mayor of Minneapolis
- In office January 2, 2014 – January 2, 2018
- Preceded by: R. T. Rybak
- Succeeded by: Jacob Frey

Member of the Minneapolis City Council from the 13th Ward
- In office January 1, 2006 – January 2, 2014
- Preceded by: Barret Lane
- Succeeded by: Linea Palmisano

Personal details
- Born: September 7, 1969 (age 57) Baltimore, Maryland, U.S.
- Party: Democratic (DFL)
- Spouse: Gary Cunningham
- Education: Bryn Mawr College (BA); University of Wisconsin (MA)

Elizabeth A. Hodges (born September 7, 1969) is an American politician who served as the 47th Mayor of Minneapolis from 2014 to 2018. A member of the Minnesota Democratic–Farmer–Labor Party (DFL), she represented Ward 13 on the Minneapolis City Council from 2006 January 2014.

Hodges was reelected to the city council in the 2009 municipal election. She won the 2013 mayoral election and was inaugurated on January 2, 2014. She ran for reelection in 2017, but lost to fellow Democrat Jacob Frey. She left office on January 2, 2018.

== Early life and education ==
Hodges grew up in Wayzata, Minnesota. She graduated from Wayzata High School in 1987. After graduating from Bryn Mawr College in 1991, she attended the University of Wisconsin–Madison, graduating in 1998 with a master's degree in sociology. Kaneaster Hodges Jr. was her uncle.

Hodges father was a cardiologist at Hennepin County Medical Center.

== Career ==
Hodges moved to southwest Minneapolis in 1998 and was the development director for the Minneapolis-based nonprofit Progressive Minnesota for a few years before serving on the staff of Hennepin County Commissioner Gail Dorfman. Hodges returned to fundraising work in 2003, working for the Minnesota Justice Foundation.

Hodges served on the Linden Hills Community Council from 2000 to 2005 and as co-chair of the council from 2003 to 2005. In November 2005, Hodges was elected to represent Ward 13 on the Minneapolis City Council, defeating Lisa McDonald.

From January 2006 until she became mayor in January 2014, Hodges represented Ward 13. She was the chair of the council's Intergovernmental Relations Committee, a position that lobbies for the city at the State Capitol, and chaired the Ways and Means Committee, which oversaw a budget of $1.2 billion in 2013. In 2011, Hodges was the council's point person on a pension-reform package. In 2012, she was one of six council members to vote against a controversial new stadium for the Minnesota Vikings. In 2013, Hodges ran for Minneapolis mayor against a field of 34 other candidates. Her platform emphasized economic and educational equality, municipal management efficiency, and infrastructure investment.

Hodges was named a 2014 Aspen Institute Rodel Fellow.

Hodges was also on the Board of Estimation and Taxation and spent four years on the Youth Coordinating Board.

Hodges met with Pope Francis on July 21, 2015. She joined eight other leaders from US cities and mayors from cities from around the world. They were invited to discuss climate change and human trafficking.

Hodges ran for reelection as mayor in the 2017 election and was eliminated in the fifth and final round of voting, finishing third among the five candidates who made it to the second round.

In 2020, Hodges published an editorial in The New York Times.

== Personal life ==
Hodges is married to Gary Cunningham. Cunningham served on the Metropolitan Council and worked for many government and non-profit organizations in Minneapolis. Hodges and Cunningham moved to Washington D.C. in 2019 for Cunningham's job as CEO of Prosperity Now.

== See also ==
- List of mayors of the largest 50 US cities

Political offices
Preceded by R. T. Rybak	Mayor of Minneapolis; 2014-2018	Succeeded by Jacob Frey
