= Minnesota Justice Foundation =

U.S. nonprofit organization

The Minnesota Justice Foundation (MJF) is a nonprofit organization that links Minnesotans who need legal aid with volunteer law students and attorneys. It was founded in 1982.

MJF does not provide direct legal assistance.
