= Raymond Dehn =

American politician

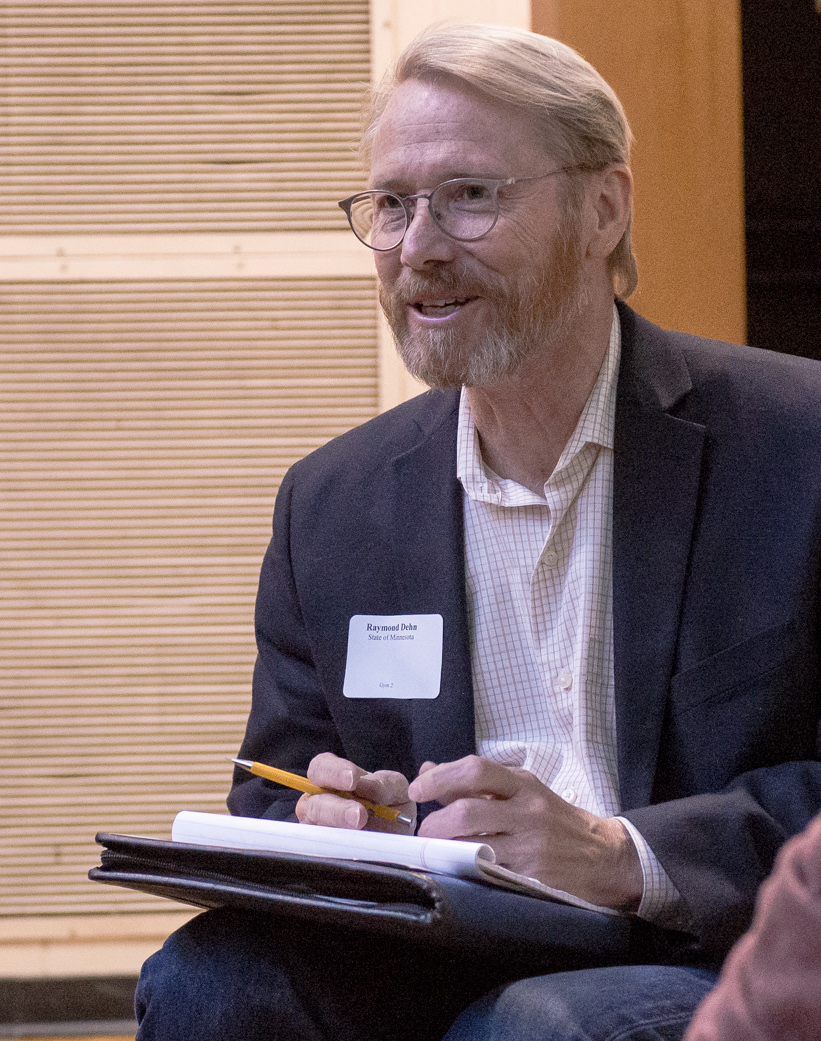

Member of the Minnesota House of Representatives from the 59B district
- In office January 8, 2013 – January 5, 2021
- Preceded by: Bobby Joe Champion (redrawn district)
- Succeeded by: Esther Agbaje

Personal details
- Born: September 14, 1957 (age 69)
- Party: Democratic
- Children: 1
- Education: University of Minnesota (BA, MArch)
- Occupation: Architect; Consultant

Raymond Howard Dehn (/diːn/ DEEN; born September 14, 1957) is an American politician and community organizer who served in the Minnesota House of Representatives from 2013 to 2021. A member of the Minnesota Democratic–Farmer–Labor Party (DFL), he last represented District 59B in Minneapolis. He was a candidate for mayor of Minneapolis in 2017.

== Early life and education ==
Dehn grew up in Brooklyn Park, Minnesota, in a working-class family. His father was a teamster, operating a forklift at a factory. His mother worked part-time at a company making toilet-paper wraps for American soldiers in Vietnam. In 1976, at age 19, Dehn was convicted of felony burglary. He served seven months at the Hennepin County Workhouse and was released to a drug treatment program due to his cocaine addiction. He has been sober since his rehabilitation. In 1982, Dehn applied for and was granted a full pardon for his felony by the State of Minnesota. He attended the University of Minnesota, graduating cum laude with a B.A. in architecture in 1993. He continued his education and received his master's of architecture from the University of Minnesota in 1996. In 2014, Dehn completed an Executive Education certificate at the Harvard Kennedy School of Government.

== Minnesota House of Representatives ==
Dehn was elected to the Minnesota House of Representatives on November 6, 2012, and reelected in 2014, 2016, and 2018. As of the 2019-20 biennium he served as the Chair of the Subcommittee on Elections, and is a member of the Capital Investment Division, Commerce Committee, and the Public Safety and Criminal Justice Reform Finance and Policy Division. As a state legislator, Dehn voted in favor of efforts such as HF 2091, raising the minimum wage without tip penalties, and enacting Minnesota Statute 364.021, legislation to Ban the Box.

In May 2020, Dehn lost the DFL endorsement to Esther Agbaje. On August 11, 2020, Agbaje won the primary election.

== Minneapolis mayoral candidacy ==
Dehn announced his candidacy for mayor on December 21, 2016. On February 2, 2017, he hosted an official campaign kickoff at the Public Functionary in Northeast Minneapolis. On July 8, he received 32.44% of the delegate vote at the DFL Minneapolis City Convention, the highest percentage of the mayoral candidates. None of the mayoral candidates received the 60% required for an endorsement at the convention. Dehn was criticized by the Star Tribune for his call to disarm some Minneapolis police officers. This call came from a statement Dehn made after the murder of Justine Damond in Minneapolis. The Star Tribune previously criticized his affirmative response to a question posed at an event on May 23, 2017: "Will you commit not to veto any City Council action supported by Our Revolution Twin Cities?"

In the November election, Dehn placed 4th in the first round, with 17.3% of the first-choice votes, and finished second in the fifth and final round, with 42.8% of the vote to winner Jacob Frey's 57.2%.
