= Jacob Frey =

Mayor of Minneapolis since 2018 (born 1981)

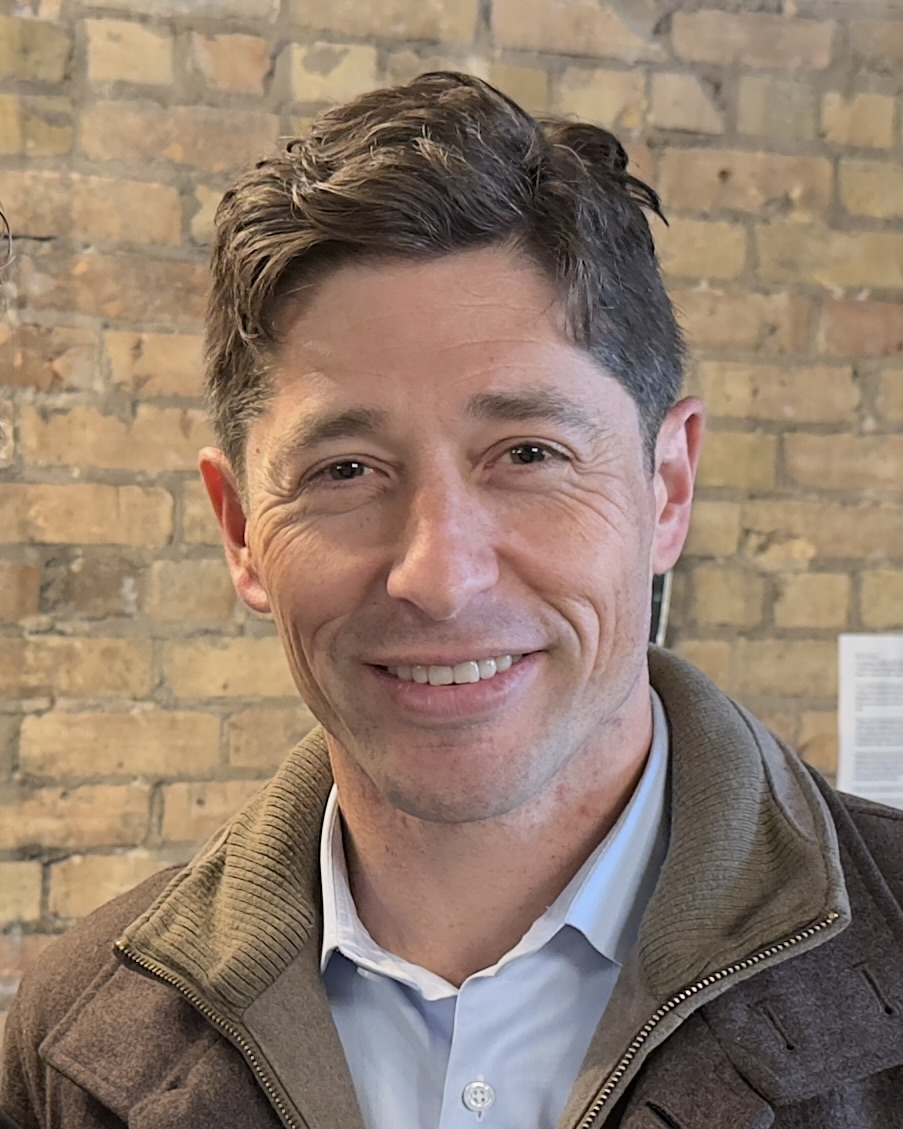
- Frey in 2025

48th Mayor of Minneapolis
- Incumbent
- Assumed office January 2, 2018
- Preceded by: Betsy Hodges

Member of the Minneapolis City Council from the 3rd ward
- In office January 2, 2014 – January 2, 2018
- Preceded by: Diane Hofstede
- Succeeded by: Steve Fletcher

Personal details
- Born: Jacob Lawrence Frey; July 23, 1981 (age 45) Arlington County, Virginia, U.S.
- Party: Democratic (DFL)
- Spouses: Michelle Lilienthal (m. 2009; div. 2014); Sarah Clarke (m. 2016)
- Children: 2
- Education: College of William and Mary (BA); Villanova University (JD)
- Website: Office website Campaign website

Jacob Lawrence Frey (Note: /fraɪ/ FRY;) (born July 23, 1981) is an American politician and attorney who has served since 2018 as the 48th mayor of Minneapolis. A member of the Minnesota Democratic–Farmer–Labor Party, he served on the Minneapolis City Council from 2014 to 2018 and was elected mayor of Minneapolis in 2017. He was reelected in 2021 and 2025.

Born and raised in Northern Virginia, Frey attended the College of William & Mary on a track and field scholarship. He later attended law school at Villanova University.

Frey was a distance runner in college and ran professionally, ranking in prominent races and receiving an athletic endorsement. After law school, he moved to Minneapolis, where he worked as an employment discrimination and civil rights lawyer before entering politics.

== Early life and education ==
Frey was born in Arlington County, Virginia, to a Jewish family. He grew up in nearby Oakton, a suburb of Washington, D.C., where his parents, Christopher and Jamie (née Goldstein) Frey, were professional modern ballet dancers. His mother is of Russian Ashkenazi Jewish ancestry. His father, who is of German and English ancestry, converted to Judaism. Frey graduated from Oakton High School and the College of William & Mary, receiving a Bachelor of Arts degree in 2004. At William & Mary, he was a distance runner on the track and field team and all-Colonial Athletic Association (CAA) cross-country runner. He competed at the 2002 NCAA Division I Cross Country Championships. Frey won the 2002 CAA 5,000-meter title in track.

== Career ==
After graduating from college, Frey received a contract from a shoe company to run professionally. He ran in several marathons across the country and competed for Team USA in the 2007 Pan American Games marathon, finishing in fourth place and with his personal record marathon time of 2:16:44. In 2008 he competed in the U.S. Olympic Team Trials, with a time of 2:18.19.

Frey moved to Minneapolis in 2009 after graduating cum laude from the Villanova University School of Law and joined the law firm Faegre & Benson to practice employment discrimination and civil rights law before moving on to the law firm Halunen & Associates. Frey gave his graduating class's commencement speech.

In late 2011, Frey ran in a special election for an open state senate seat and came in fifth in the party primary, ahead only of someone who had dropped out of the race.

In 2012, Frey founded and organized the first Big Gay Race, a 5K charity race to raise money for Minnesotans United for All Families, a political group organizing for marriage equality.

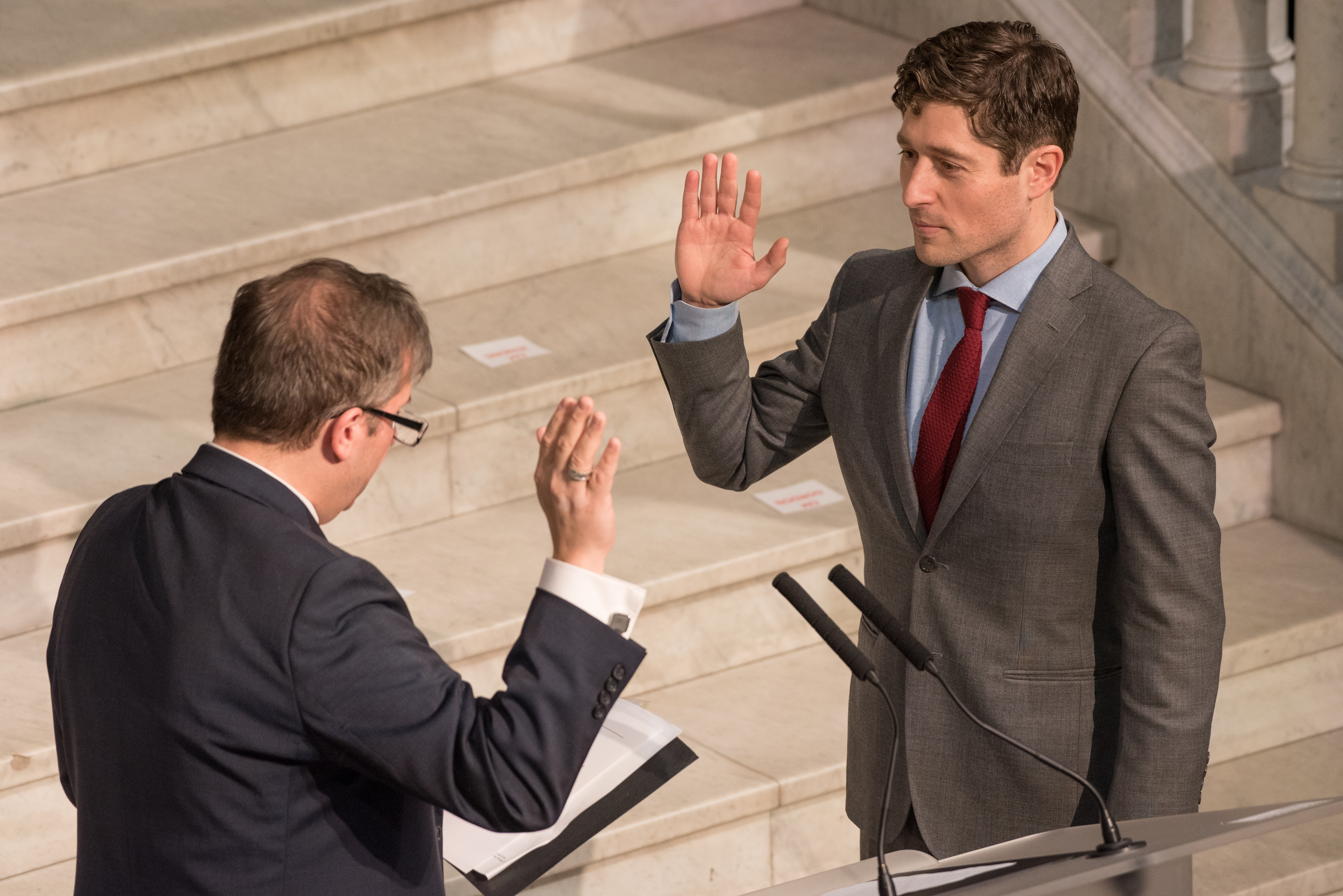
Frey being sworn in as mayor

Frey ran in the 2013 Minneapolis City Council election to represent Ward 3. He received the Democratic–Farmer–Labor endorsement, as well as endorsements from more than 40 elected officials and organizations. His platform promised better constituent services, to spur residential development, increase the number and variety of small and local businesses, push for full funding of affordable housing, and address climate change. He defeated incumbent Diane Hofstede with more than 60% of the vote and took office on January 2, 2014. He served one term on the Minneapolis City Council before becoming mayor.

=== Mayoral tenure ===
Frey announced his candidacy for mayor of Minneapolis in January 2017, campaigning on a platform of increasing support for affordable housing and improving police-community relations. He won the 2017 election, making him Minneapolis's second Jewish mayor and its second-youngest after Al Hofstede, who was 34 when he was elected in 1973.

Frey was reelected with 56.2% of the vote in 2021, defeating challenger Kate Knuth in the final round of ranked-choice voting. He is the first mayor to serve under the "strong mayor" system, a power reorganization that changed the city council from a governing body to a legislative body and gave the mayor direct control over 11 city departments. The change was approved as a charter amendment by ballot measure in 2021. Frey campaigned in favor of the strong mayor system.

On January 12, 2022, in a joint announcement with St. Paul mayor Melvin Carter, Minneapolis announced the beginning of a vaccine passport. The passport required anyone entering an establishment that served food to be vaccinated or provide a negative COVID-19 test. Unlike some cities that implemented the mandate, Frey reaffirmed the mask mandate along with the new restrictions. Restaurants and bars sued over the mandate, but it was upheld by a Hennepin county judge. The mandate was dropped on February 10.

In March 2022, Frey fired a senior policy aide, Abdi Salah, after learning he was being investigated in connection with the Feeding Our Future fraud investigation. Frey said he was unaware of Salah's activities, which included giving Frey talking points written by the organization's leader, Aimee Bock, for an event hosted for multiple elected officials.

Since the strong mayor system was implemented, Frey has issued eight executive orders. The first established Minneapolis as a safe haven for reproductive rights and healthcare after Roe v. Wade was overturned.

In 2024, Frey set a record for vetoes issued in a year—eight, with four sustained. Vetoed legislation included a resolution on the Israeli–Palestinian conflict, a minimum wage for rideshare drivers, a statement in support of amnesty for student protesters who damaged University of Minnesota property, and a resolution for a labor standards board to advise the city council on labor issues. The City Council rejected Frey's own proposal for a rideshare driver minimum wage and put forward a different version, after which Uber and Lyft threatened to cease serving the metropolitan area. A later state law, now in effect, is nearly identical to Frey's ordinance.

In January 2025, Frey announced his intention to run for a third term, saying it would be his last mayoral campaign. On July 19, the Minneapolis DFL endorsed state senator Omar Fateh over Frey. On August 21, in response to an appeal filed by Frey's campaign, the state DFL revoked the endorsement, citing issues with the city convention process, including an undercount of votes and the erroneous elimination of candidate DeWayne Davis.

In October 2025, it was reported that Frey uses one cellular phone for both personal and government business. Additionally, Frey was unable to fulfill records requests for governmental phone records between October 23 and October 28, the period immediately after the high-profile shooting of Davis Moturi, and those relating to a June 2025 Department of Homeland Security raid when there was substantial evidence to suggest pertinent communication had occurred. By Minnesota state law, city officials are allowed to delete "transitory" communications, but the term is not defined.

In December 2025, Frey responded to the expanded presence of U.S. Immigration and Customs Enforcement (ICE) agents in Minneapolis by signing an executive order banning federal officials from using city property for staging areas.

In January 2026, Frey dismissed a Department of Homeland Security claim that the shooting of a woman by an ICE agent was done in self-defense, calling it "bullshit". He also told ICE agents to "get the fuck out of Minneapolis" and criticized the Trump administration's decision to block the Minnesota Bureau of Criminal Apprehension from investigating the shooting. He also criticized a second ICE-involved shooting that took place on January 14, calling the ICE deployment to Minneapolis "unsustainable" and saying it put Minneapolis in an "impossible situation" while also urging that protests be peaceful.

== Political positions ==
=== Infrastructure ===
In March 2020, Frey approved the purchase of a K-Mart store on Nicollet Avenue that blocked the road and created transit issues between Lake Street and 29th Street. Upon announcing the acquisition, Frey put forward the New Nicollet initiative, with the stated goal of creating new businesses, housing and public spaces.

In 2022, Frey submitted his version of the Hennepin Avenue Redesign, an extension of the Transportation Action Plan that updates Hennepin Avenue between Lake St. and Douglas Ave. The City Council amended the redesign plan, adding language that would make the existing bus lane exclusive to buses 24/7. Frey vetoed that amendment. His veto was later sustained and he facilitated a compromise that dedicates the lane to buses during rush hour and adds an above-grade bike lane.

Frey has championed the idea of turning Nicollet Mall into a "pedestrian utopia" by rerouting bus traffic (car traffic is already prohibited) to neighboring streets and encouraging social programming. He has also supported open-container "social districts" in the city and attempts to turn underutilized downtown office buildings into housing.

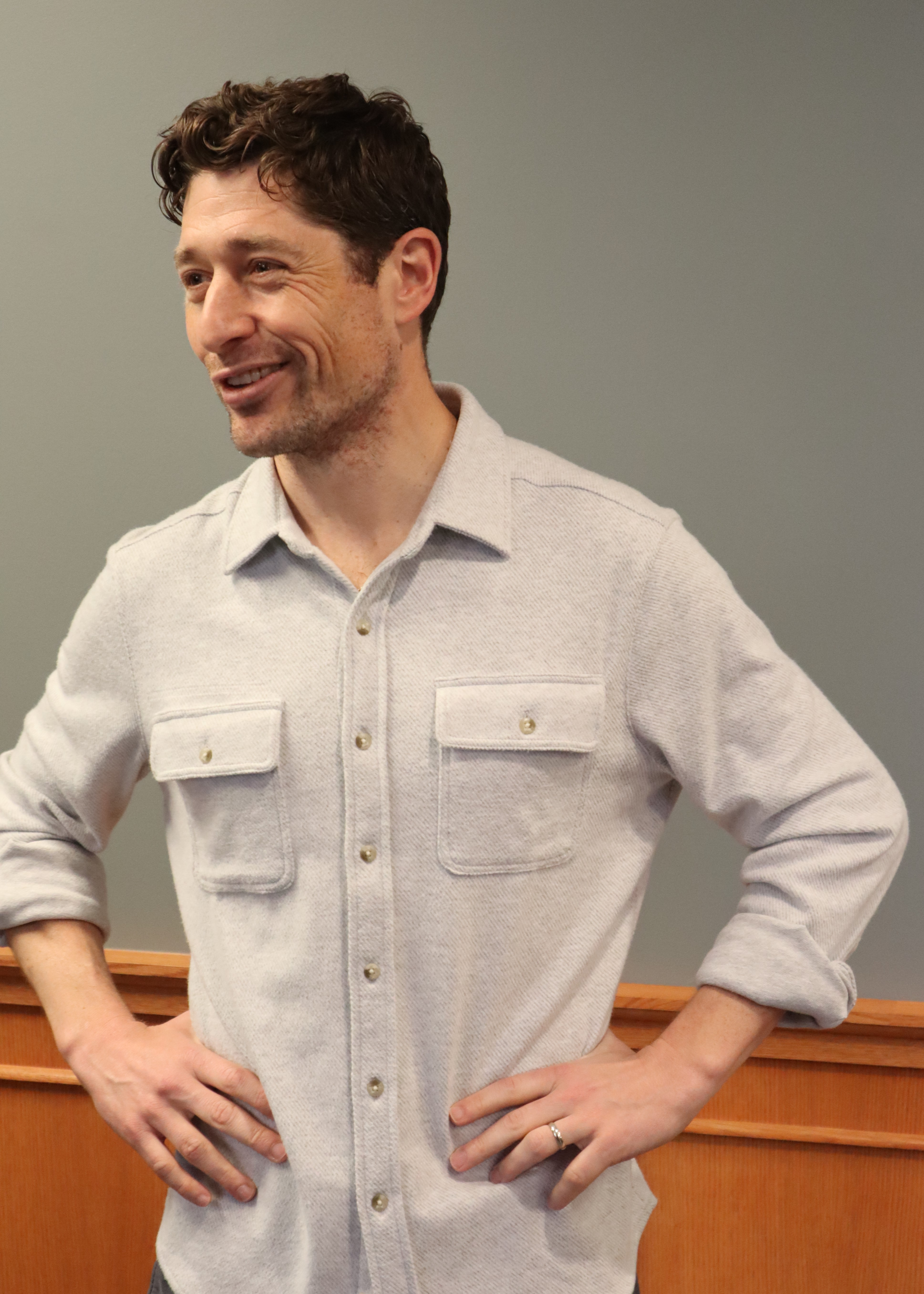
Frey at a city hall open house in 2025

=== Voting rights and access ===
As chair of the council's Elections Committee, Frey led the effort to pass an ordinance requiring landlords to give tenants voter registration information. The ordinance has served as a national model, with cities like Seattle and St. Paul following suit. A federal district court judge later struck down the ordinance as unconstitutional. Frey also led the effort to expand early voting access in Minneapolis ahead of the 2016 election, increasing the number of early voting sites in Minneapolis from one to five.

=== Housing and homelessness ===
Frey authored an amendment to the 2015 budget that increased funding for the city's Affordable Housing Trust Fund.

In 2018, Frey's first budget as mayor focused heavily on affordable housing. Its $40 million allocation to affordable housing was triple what the city previously spent on affordable housing. That year, the Minneapolis City Council approved the Minneapolis 2040 Comprehensive Plan, a state-mandated comprehensive rezoning reform plan. According to Slate, the plan would "permit three-family homes in the city's residential neighborhoods, abolish parking minimums for all new construction, and allow high-density buildings along transit corridors." Slate wrote that by implementing the plan, "Minneapolis will become the first major U.S. city to end single-family home zoning, a policy that has done as much as any to entrench segregation, high housing costs, and sprawl as the American urban paradigm over the past century."

In 2019, Frey launched the pilot program Stable Homes Stable Schools, a partnership between the City of Minneapolis, Minneapolis Public Schools, Hennepin County, the Minneapolis Public Housing Authority, and YMCA of the North to provide housing assistance to families with children enrolled in public schools who are experiencing or at risk of homelessness. In 2020, after serving more than 2,000 public school students, Frey expanded the program and made it permanent. By 2025, the program had served over 6,600 children and over 2,300 families.

Frey does not support rent control, particularly on new construction. He opposed a 2021 ballot question that would have allowed rent control ballot measures to be considered in future elections. In 2023, he threatened to veto a 3% limit on rent increases, citing the 80% decline in housing production after St. Paul implemented a similar policy.

In April 2025, Frey cited a city dashboard and claimed that 27 people in the city were experiencing unsheltered homelessness. He has championed clearing large encampments and attributes a reduction in homelessness to this. Frey received criticism for his role in closing Camp Nenookaasi, a large encampment that was home primarily to native people, after a shooting killed one person.

=== Police and police reform ===
Frey has consistently championed significant annual increases in the MPD budget. Community groups have protested these increases and the lack of significant investment in community-led safety alternatives.

Frey introduced reforms to the Minneapolis Police Department's body camera policy in April 2018, tying non-compliance to stricter disciplinary consequences. In 2019, Frey announced during his State of the City address the banning of "warrior" training for police officers, which had been taken by the officer who killed Philando Castile.

==== Response to the murder of George Floyd ====
On May 27, 2020, after the start of protests sparked by the murder of George Floyd, Frey backed the firing of the four police officers involved in the death. The next day, he called for criminal charges against Derek Chauvin, the arresting officer who pressed his knee on Floyd's neck, saying, "If you had done it or I had done it, we would be behind bars right now." On June 5, in response to the protests, Frey directed changes to the MPD that the City Council approved to go into effect immediately. These included banning chokeholds and neck restraints, requiring police officers to report and intervene against the use of excessive force by other officers, and requiring authorization from the police chief or deputy police chiefs before using crowd-control weapons such as chemical agents and rubber bullets.

On June 6, thousands of protesters pushing for the abolition of the MPD marched to Frey's apartment and demanded he come out to address the crowd. Protesters asked Frey, who was wearing a face mask with the words "I can't breathe" on it, whether he would commit to defunding the MPD. He answered, "I do not support the full abolition of police." Attendees chanted "go home" and "shame" at Frey as he left following his answer.

On April 20, 2021, after Derek Chauvin was found guilty of murder, Frey wrote on Twitter: "George Floyd came to Minneapolis to better his life. But ultimately his life will have bettered our city. The jury joined in a shared conviction that has animated Minneapolis for the last 11 months. They refused to look away and affirmed he should still be here today." This statement was heavily criticized and many called on Frey to fire his communications staff.

Frey has said that he lobbied Governor Tim Walz to deploy the National Guard to quell the 2020 uprising when Walz was hesitant to do so.

It has been documented that the force the Minneapolis Police Department used against protesters during the uprising caused substantial levels of injury, and the University of Minnesota found that it violated United Nations guidelines.

In October 2024, the Frey administration had proposed an overhaul of the area of George Floyd Square that would allow traffic to fully return to the street. In 2025, he vetoed a City Council measure to turn the square into a pedestrian mall, citing previous community engagement that supported his plan to allow car traffic.

In May 2025, after the US Justice Department withdrew the consent decree mandating reform to the MPD, Frey said the city would continue to implement the reforms laid out in the decree.

==== Later policing policies ====
In November 2020, Frey announced that the MPD had been banned from using no-knock warrants. In the wake of the killing of Amir Locke in early 2022, Frey admitted that no such ban had actually been implemented. He was further criticized for walking out of a press conference on the subject.

In August 2022, it was announced that the MPD, while under Frey's control, had "decided to use drones". The purchase of drones and drone use policy continued despite criticism at the city council committee meeting where it was discussed.

In July 2023, Frey signed an executive order instructing the MPD to make enforcement of laws concerning entheogenic plants, such as psychoactive mushrooms, the "lowest law enforcement priority". Frey has also consistently supported cannabis legalization.

==== Public safety training center ("Cop City") ====
In March 2026, the Minneapolis City Council delayed the Frey administration's plan to build a $48 million public safety training center on a 4.7-acre property in Windom. The project had been in the works for more than five years and had remained a top priority for a city council vote. Backed by Frey, Police Commander Kris Brown, and Public Safety Commissioner Todd Barnette, the project would provide space for training and wellness services for police, firefighters, 911 dispatchers, violence prevention workers, emergency management, Neighborhood Safety, and others. If approved, the city would begin construction on the facility in late 2027 or early 2028, and it would open in late 2029 or early 2030.

Police currently train at a former elementary school in north Minneapolis, the Hamilton Special Operations Center, which has incurred costs over $20 million since 2006. The police department's Health and Wellness Unit also operates out of the building and was overcrowded in the wake of the Annunciation Catholic Church shooting and Operation Metro Surge.

Opponents, including some city council members, argue that the center is akin to Atlanta's Cop City and/or that the money should be otherwise used. Supporters on the council point to the project's small size.

=== Sanctuary city status ===
In January 2025, after the University of Minnesota said it would comply with Immigration and Customs Enforcement (ICE), Frey told the media that the City of Minneapolis would not aid in identifying undocumented immigrants and that the MPD would not aid ICE. In March 2025, Frey said that Minneapolis would remain a sanctuary city for undocumented immigrants.

On June 4, 2025, the Minneapolis Police Department performed crowd control during a Homeland Security operation in South Minneapolis with uniformed ICE agents present. An independent report by the Minneapolis City Auditor found that the Minneapolis Police Department did not violate the city's separation ordinance, which bans police from directly participating in immigration enforcement.

=== Environment ===
In 2016, Frey authored an ordinance requiring polluters to pay fees based on the amount of pollution they produce. The fees are used to support green business improvements. Frey and the City of Minneapolis were honored at the 2018 U.S. Conference of Mayors for the program's success.

=== Roof Depot ===
In 2016, the City of Minneapolis purchased the Roof Depot property in the Phillips neighborhood, the former site of a pesticide producer, for $6.8 million, with plans to expand its Public Works campus. The project was intended to replace an aging waterworks facility.

The site was known to be extensively contaminated by arsenic, which led to community concern about health risks from the demolition that would be needed to repurpose the site. Frey said the demolition could proceed safely with strict precautions, but local residents remained opposed. Residents of Little Earth, a Native American neighborhood near the site, were critical of the project. Opposition to the demolition was led by the East Phillips Neighborhood Institute (EPNI), which advocated transforming the property into an urban farm, complete with sustainable agriculture and community spaces.

In 2022, after a contentious City Council vote to suspend the project, Frey issued a veto that kept the demolition plans on track.

In February 2023, activists staged a brief occupation of the Roof Depot site in an attempt to halt the demolition. Frey’s administration directed the MPD to clear the occupation, resulting in the arrest of six protesters, many of whom were involved in the American Indian Movement. Shortly after the demonstration, the Minnesota Court of Appeals temporarily blocked the demolition, offering activists a brief window to pursue an appeal. But Frey has shown little inclination to halt the project, emphasizing the city’s commitment to the public works campus. Frey has made offers to split the property for both public works and community use, but EPNI and other activist groups argue that such a compromise would still prioritize industrial development over area residents' health.

In August 2025, Frey was scheduled to meet with EPNI about a looming deadline to purchase the Roof Depot for $16 million. EPNI had raised more than $10 million and disputed the purchase price on the grounds that a recent appraisal of the property had found it to have a market value of roughly $3.7 million. Frey canceled the meeting after learning that the Climate Justice Committee, an unrelated local environmental organization, was planning a rally supporting EPNI's purchase of the Roof Depot that would have ended outside his residence. The rally was moved at the behest of EPNI staff, but the meeting was not rescheduled.

=== Labor relations ===
Frey was involved in drafting the council's 2016 paid sick leave ordinance and 2017 minimum wage ordinance. He was one of the first council members to support a city minimum wage increase. Frey authored an amendment to the minimum wage ordinance that gave small businesses a longer phase-in than large businesses to implement the minimum wage.

During his 2023 State of the City address, Frey pleaded with workers to return to their downtown offices at least three days a week.

In early 2024, Frey told attendees of the Minneapolis Downtown Council annual meeting that people who work from home for more than three months become "losers", possibly signaling support of return-to-office efforts to commercial real estate interests. Frey has said that this was a misconstrued joke. Also in early 2024, he vetoed two pieces of legislation intended to ensure that rideshare services like Uber and Lyft provide compensation equal to at least the city minimum wage.

In September 2024, Frey vetoed the establishment of a labor standards board that would have offered policy recommendations to the City Council. A group of almost 400 business owners wrote an open letter asking Frey to veto the proposed board, saying it would make business harder to conduct. Frey had supported the idea two years earlier, but vetoed it when businesses pulled out, unwilling to serve on a board they called one-sided.

=== Responses to pro-Palestinian activism ===
In early 2024, Frey vetoed a ceasefire resolution the City Council developed in response to the Gaza war following the October 7 attacks, calling the passed version "one-sided" because it "all but erases [the history] of Israeli Jews". Frey put together his own version of the ceasefire resolution that endorsed a two-state solution.

In December 2024, Frey vetoed a statement of support for amnesty for students who occupied and damaged a University of Minnesota campus building in hopes of getting the university to divest from Israeli securities and weapons manufacturers and were punished for it. Frey said he vetoed the resolution "without hesitation" because he did not support "damaging property and endangering the safety of others".

=== Plans to rebuild the third precinct ===
In October 2024, after a visit by JD Vance to the site of Minneapolis's 3rd Police Precinct, which was burned during the 2020 uprising, Frey urged the City Council to approve a plan that replaced the existing structure with a "democracy center", which would house the city's election offices alongside a space for a community organization. Critics of the plan expressed dismay that solicited proposals for alternative uses submitted by community groups were dismissed without due consideration of the democracy center.

The mayor's office performed community engagement to aid in deciding where the 3rd Precinct should be rebuilt, reported results of which pointed toward not rebuilding at the same location. The public engagement process was heavily criticized as designed to manufacture consent for a predetermined plan to rebuild the precinct by way of not allowing respondents to say they did not want the precinct rebuilt at all.

=== Self-driving cars ===
In October 2026, Frey vetoed a resolution requiring human safety drivers in robotaxis.

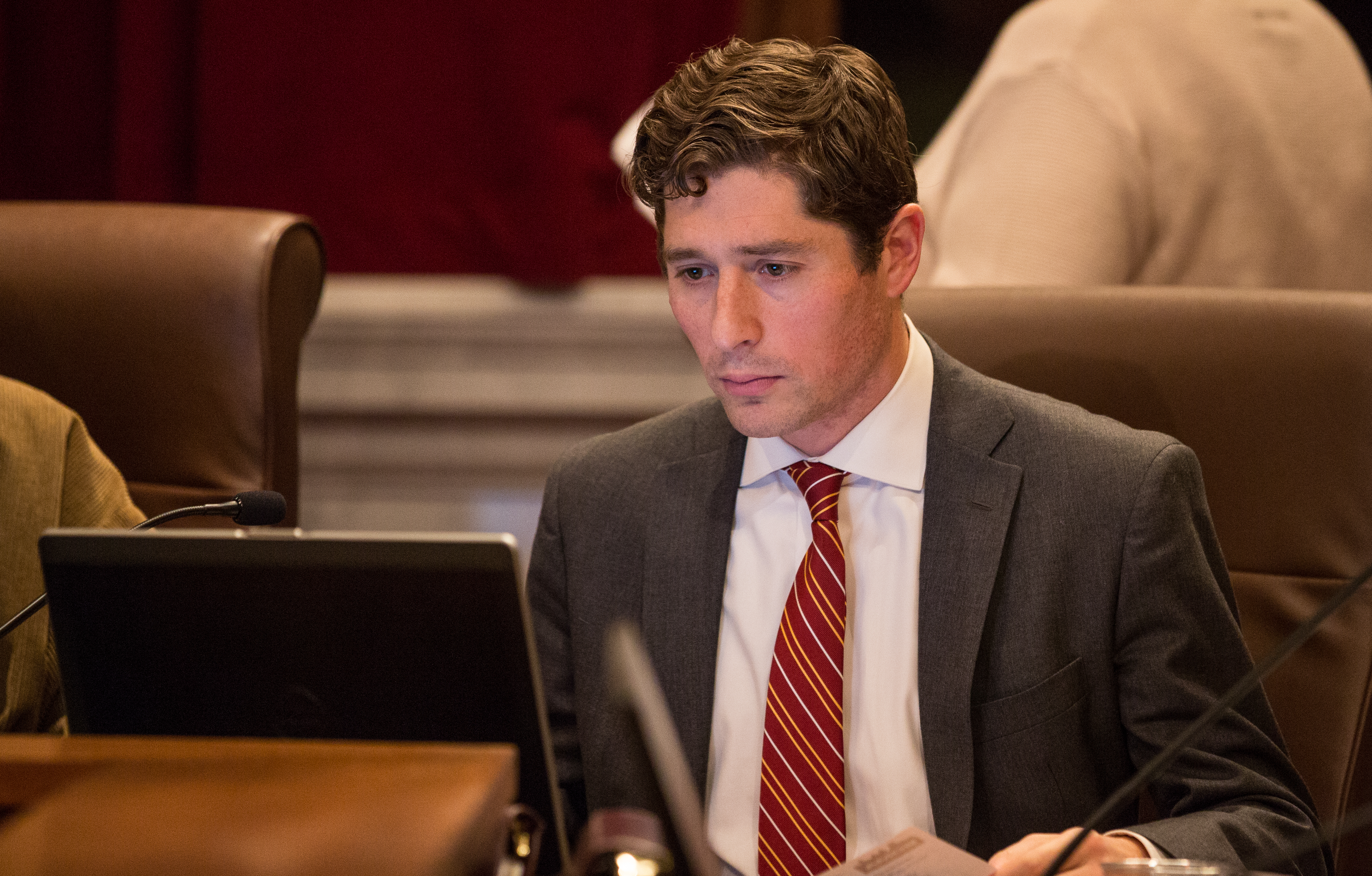
Frey at a Minneapolis City Council budget hearing in 2015

== Electoral history ==
=== 2025 Minneapolis mayoral election ===
Frey was reelected to a third term in 2025.

He sought the Minneapolis DFL endorsement alongside DeWayne Davis, Omar Fateh, Jazz Hampton, and Brenda Short at the endorsing convention on July 19, 2025. The convention endorsed a mayoral candidate in a contested race for the first time since 1997, with Fateh winning the endorsement after receiving 43.58% of the vote in the first round and over 60% in the second. Frey's supporters allegedly participated in a walkout during the second vote, a tactic intended to break quorum. Frey's campaign appealed Fateh's victory to the state party.

On August 21, the Minnesota DFL revoked Fateh's endorsement, citing failures in the voting process, including an error in ballot software usage and a poorly secured registration spreadsheet. The state DFL placed the Minneapolis DFL on a two-year probation and forbade it from holding a second convention or otherwise endorsing in the 2025 mayoral election. The Minneapolis DFL appealed, citing conflicts of interest and claiming that the committee that made the determination was acting outside of its authority. The appeal failed and the DFL upheld its decision to revoke Fateh's endorsement.

As of July 28, Frey had raised $538,000 in campaign funds, the most of any candidate in the race, ahead of Fateh's $213,000. He was endorsed by All of Minneapolis, a political action committee dedicated to advancing centrist democrats for political office in Minneapolis.

On November 4, Frey was elected to a third term. After two rounds of tabulation, Frey had 50.03% of the vote, enough to win outright after second- and third-choices were transferred. Fateh stood at 44.37%, while around 5.5% of votes were exhausted after the voters' preferences were eliminated.

2025 Minneapolis mayoral general election
Party	Candidate	Maximum round	Maximum votes	Share in maximum round	Maximum votes First round votes Transfer votes
Democratic (DFL)	Jacob Frey (incumbent)	2	73,723	50.03%	
Democratic (DFL)	Omar Fateh	2	65,377	44.37%	
Democratic (DFL)	DeWayne Davis	1	20,414	13.85%	
Democratic (DFL)	Jazz Hampton	1	15,339	10.41%	
Various	All others (Note: Candidates receiving under 1% of the vote)	1	3,432	2.33%	
Write-in		1	113	0.08%	

=== 2021 Minneapolis mayoral election ===
2021 Minneapolis mayoral general election
Party	Candidate	Maximum round	Maximum votes	Share in maximum round	Maximum votes First round votes Transfer votes
Democratic (DFL)	Jacob Frey (incumbent)	2	70,669	56.2%	
Democratic (DFL)	Kate Knuth	2	55,007	43.8%	
Democratic (DFL)	Sheila Nezhad	1	30,368	21.1%	
Democratic (DFL)	A.J. Awed	1	6,860	4.8%	
Republican	Laverne Turner	1	4,620	3.2%	
Democratic (DFL)	Clint Conner	1	4,309	3.0%	
Republican	Bob Carney	1	2,788	1.9%	
Various	All others	1	6,796	4.60%	
Write-in		1	145	0.1%	

=== 2017 Minneapolis mayoral election ===
2017 Minneapolis mayoral election
Party	Candidate	Maximum round	Maximum votes	Share in maximum round	Maximum votes First round votes Transfer votes
Democratic (DFL)	Jacob Frey	5	46,716	57.2%	
Democratic (DFL)	Raymond Dehn	5	34,971	42.8%	
Democratic (DFL)	Betsy Hodges (incumbent)	4	26,875	28.7%	
Democratic (DFL)	Tom Hoch	3	22,754	22.8%	
Democratic (DFL)	Nekima Levy-Pounds	2	16,189	15.9%	
Libertarian	Charlie Gers	1	1,233	1.2%	
Various	All others	1	4,178	4.00%	
Write-in		1	138	0.1%	

=== 2013 Minneapolis City Council ward 3 election ===
2013 Minneapolis City Council Ward 3 election, first round
Party	Candidate	Votes	%
Democratic (DFL)	Jacob Frey	3,722	61.31%
Democratic (DFL)	Diane Hofstede	1,614	26.59%
Libertarian	Michael Katch	363	5.98%
Green	Kristina Gronquist	357	5.88%
Write-in		15	0.25%
Total votes		6,071	100.00%
Turnout		6,206 (Note: Includes valid votes, overvotes, and undervotes.)	30.99%

=== 2012 Minnesota Senate district 59 special election ===
2012 Minnesota Senate district 59 special election, DFL primary
Party	Candidate	Votes	%
Democratic (DFL)	Kari Dziedzic	1,965	32.11%
Democratic (DFL)	Mohamud Noor	1,626	26.57%
Democratic (DFL)	Peter Wagenius	1,089	17.80%
Democratic (DFL)	Paul Ostrow	792	12.94%
Democratic (DFL)	Jacob Frey	473	7.73%
Democratic (DFL)	Alicia Frosch	36	0.59%
Total votes		5,981	100.00%

== Personal life ==
Frey married his first wife, world-class long distance runner Michelle Lilienthal in 2009. They divorced in 2014.

Frey married his second wife, Sarah Clarke, in 2016. Clarke is a lobbyist for Hylden Advocacy & Law, where she represents businesses, nonprofits, and community organizations at the Minnesota legislature and executive branch agencies. In 2020, the couple had their first child. Their second child was born in July 2025.

Frey follows Reform Judaism and attends a Reform synagogue in Minneapolis, Temple Israel, together with his wife, a convert to Judaism.

In November 2025, Frey revealed that his parents had become Minneapolis residents.

== See also ==
- 2020–2021 Minneapolis–Saint Paul racial unrest
- List of mayors of the 50 largest cities in the United States

== Notes ==
Political offices
Preceded by Betsy Hodges	Mayor of Minneapolis; 2018–present	Incumbent
