= Szabó =

Szabó (Hungarian: [ˈsɒboː]) is a common Hungarian surname, meaning "tailor". In 2019, it occurred in 203,126 names, making it the fourth most frequent Hungarian surname.

In Czech and Slovak, a female form is Szabóová.

== Origin ==
It is usually originated from the present participle form ("szabó") of the verb "szab", meaning to "cut cloth to size", which then became a noun denoting the occupation of a tailor. It is also thought that the other meaning of the verb "kiszab", denoting the act of imposing fines, levying taxes etc. could have also led to the creation of the noun "szabó", meaning an occupation similar to a judge's or magistrate's. The existence of the two meanings could also justify why this surname could become so wide-spread.

== People with this name ==
- Attila Szabó, several people
- Bence Szabó (fencer) (born 1962), fencer
- Brett Szabo (born 1968), American basketball player
- Claire Szabó (born 1979), New Zealand politician
- Dávid Szabó (born 1990), volleyball player
- Dezső Szabó (writer) (1879–1945), Hungarian writer
- Dezső Szabó (athlete) (born 1967), decathlete
- Ecaterina Szabo (born 1966), Hungarian-born Romanian gymnast
- Ervin Szabó (1877–1918), Hungarian Marxist
- Ferenc Szabó, several people
- Gabriela Szabo (born 1975), Romanian athlete
- Gabriella Szabó (born 1986), canoer
- Gábor Szabó (1936–1982), jazz guitarist
- Herma Szabo (1902–1986), Austrian figure skater
- István Szabó, several people
- John Szabo (born 1968), City Librarian of Los Angeles
- Joseph Szabo (born 1944), American photographer
- Joseph C. Szabo, Administrator of the United States Federal Railroad Administration (2009-2015)
- József Szabó (born 1969), swimmer
- József Szabó de Szentmiklós (1822–1894), geologist
- Yozhef Sabo, Ukrainian footballer, coach and functionairy of Hungarian descent
- Karolina Szabó (born 1961), Hungarian long-distance runner
- Károly Szabó (1916–1964), employee of the Swedish Embassy in Budapest
- Károly Ferenc Szabó (1943–2011), Hungarian-born Romanian politician
- Krisztina Szabó, Hungarian-Canadian mezzo-soprano
- László Szabó, several people
- Lőrinc Szabó (1900–1957), poet and literary translator
- Magda Szabó (1917–2007), writer
- Magda Szabo (born 1934), painter of miniatures
- Matyas Szabo (born 1991), German fencer of Hungarian origin
- Miklós Szabó, several people
- Nick Szabo, computer scientist, legal scholar and cryptographer
- Nikolett Szabó (born 1980), javelin thrower
- Paul Szabo (fencer) (born 1954), Romanian fencer at the 1976 Summer Olympics
- Paul Szabo (politician) (1948–2024), Canadian politician
- Paul Szabo (rugby union) (born 1962), Canadian rugby union player
- Rose Szabo, American author of What Big Teeth
- Sándor Szabó, several people
- Stephen Szabo, prominent scholar of transatlantic relations
- Szilvia Szabó (born 1978), canoer
- Vilmoș Szabo (1964), fencer and fencing coach
- Violette Szabo (1921–1945), secret agent
- Zoltán Szabó, several people
- Zsuzsanna Szabó-Olgyai (born 1973), Hungarian pole vaulter
- Zsuzsanna Szabó (footballer) (born 1991), Hungarian footballer
- Mélinda Jacques-Szabo (born 1971), Hungarian-French handball player

== See also ==
- Sabo (disambiguation)
