= Phillips West, Minneapolis =

Neighborhood in Minneapolis, Minnesota

Coordinates: 44°57′15″N 93°16′00″W

Phillips West
- Neighborhood
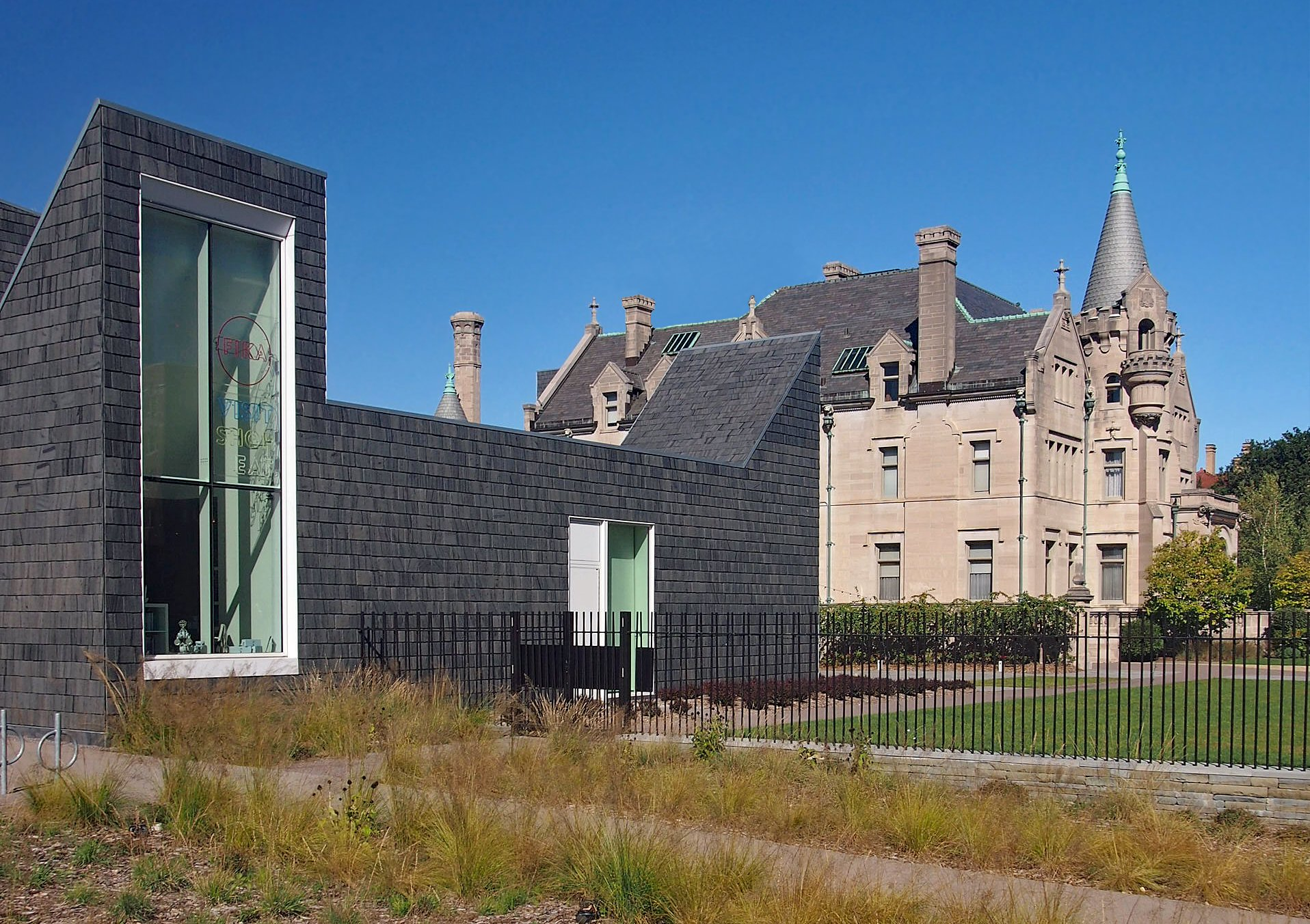
- The American Swedish Institute in Phillips West

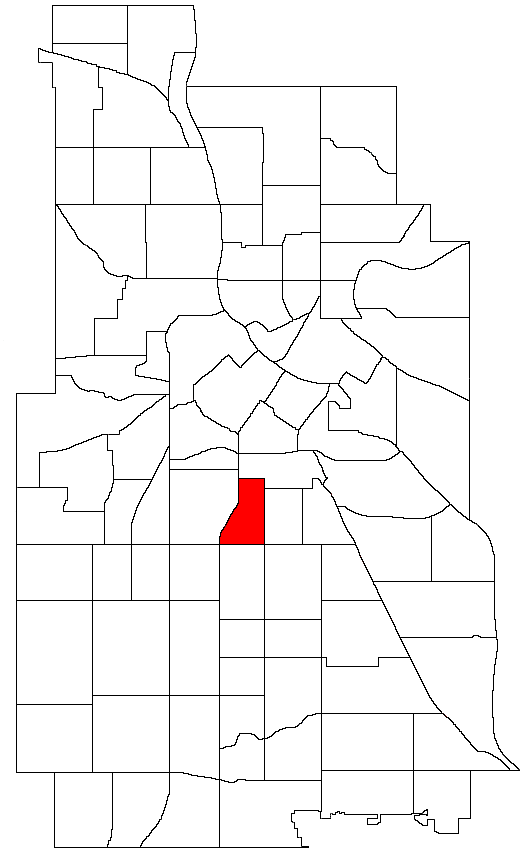
- Location of Phillips West within the U.S. city of Minneapolis
- Interactive map of Phillips West
- Country: United States
- State: Minnesota
- County: Hennepin
- City: Minneapolis
- Community: Phillips
- Founded: 1849
- City Council Ward: 6

Government
  - Council Member: Jamal Osman

Population (2020)
  - Total: 5,056
- Time zone: UTC-6 (CST)
  - Summer (DST): UTC-5 (CDT)
- ZIP code: 55404, 55407, 55408
- Area code: 612

Historical population
Census	Pop.	Note	%±
2000	4,771		—
2010	4,727		−0.9%
2020	5,056		7.0%

Phillips West is a neighborhood within the Phillips community in Minneapolis. Its boundaries are East 22nd Street to the north, Chicago Avenue to the east, East Lake Street to the south, and Interstate 35W to the west. It is entirely located within Minneapolis City Council Ward 6, represented by Jamal Osman.

The Phillips community has only been subdivided into smaller neighborhoods within the last two decades; the boundaries of Phillips West were officially designated on April 29, 2005. As this change has been fairly recent, most residents still refer to the area as just "Phillips".

The Phillips West Neighborhood Organization (PWNO) holds monthly community meetings (on the 1st Thursday of each month) and PWNO board meetings (on the 4th Monday of each month). The PWNO also plans and hosts the annual Phillips West Winter Social and National Night Out events and participates in the Phillips West and Phillips Clean Sweep events.

== Demographics ==
Race/ethnicity
Race/ethnicity	2000		2010		2020	
Race/ethnicity	Number	%	Number	%	Number	%
White alone	1,551	32.51	1,195	25.28	1,040	20.57
Black alone	1,577	33.05	2,025	42.84	2,338	46.24
Hispanic or Latino (any race)	904	18.95	1,083	22.91	1,313	25.97
Native American alone	171	3.58	113	2.39	76	1.50
Asian alone	235	4.93	125	2.64	101	2.00
Other race alone	13	0.27	15	0.32	16	0.32
Pacific Islander alone	0	0.00	2	0.04	4	0.08
Two or more races	320	6.71	169	3.58	168	3.32
Total	4,771	100.0	4,727	100.0	5,056	100.0
