= Zsuzsanna Szabó =

Zsuzsanna Szabó may refer to:

- Zsuzsanna Szabó-Olgyai (born 1973), Hungarian pole vaulter
- Zsuzsanna Szabó (footballer) (born 1991), Hungarian footballer
