= Midtown Phillips, Minneapolis =

Midtown Phillips
- Neighborhood
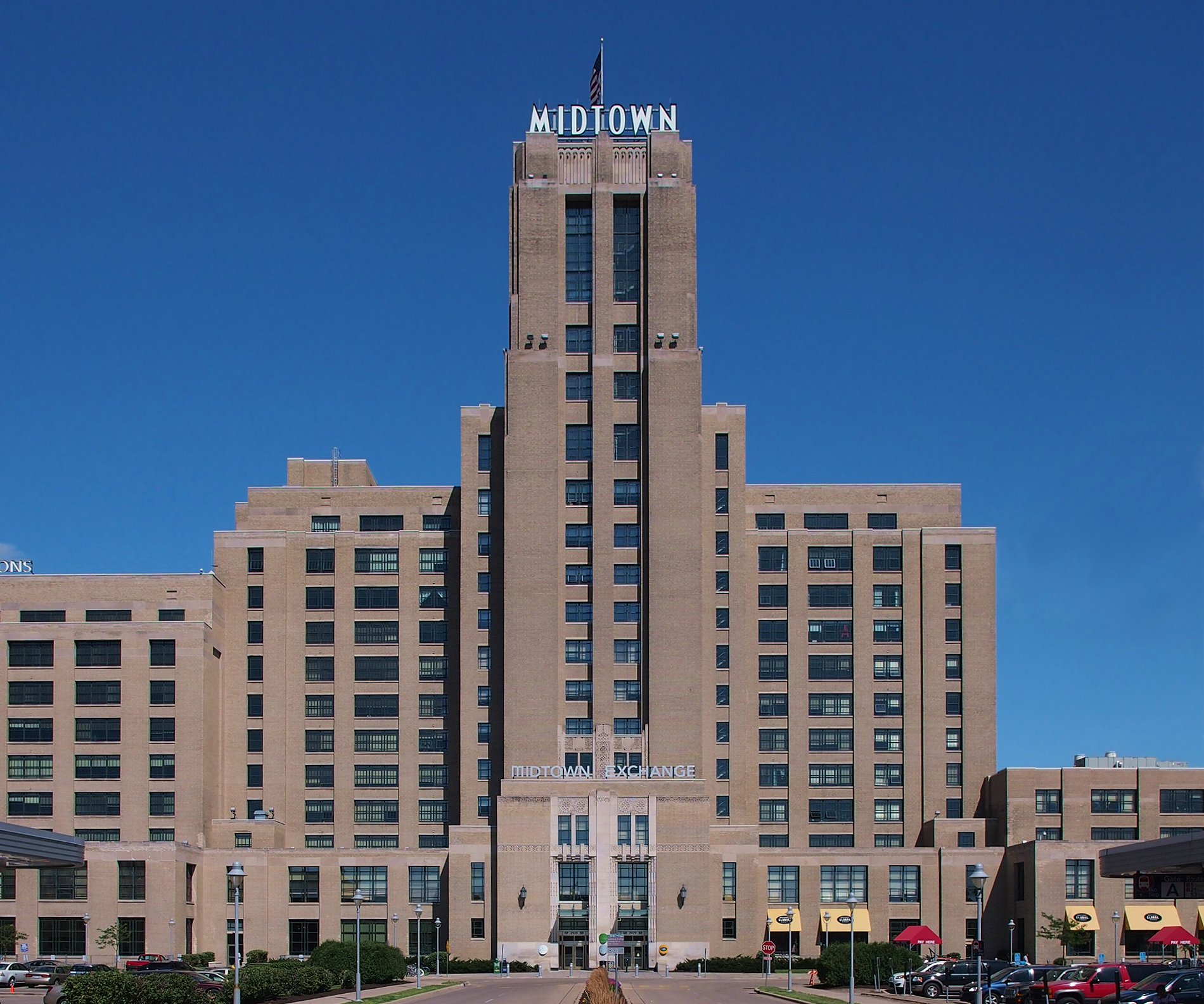
- The Midtown Exchange in Midtown Phillips

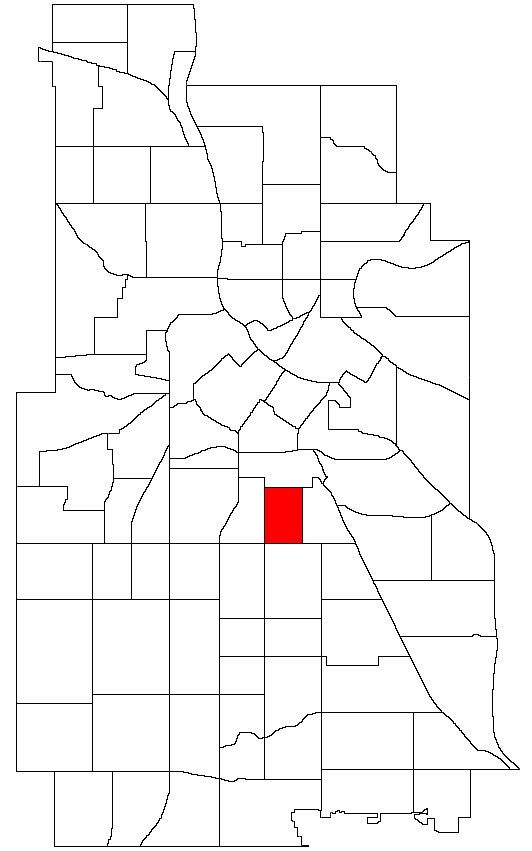
- Location of Midtown Phillips within the U.S. city of Minneapolis
- Interactive map of Midtown Phillips
- Coordinates: 44°57′14″N 93°15′26″W
- Country: United States
- State: Minnesota
- County: Hennepin
- City: Minneapolis
- Community: Phillips
- Founded: 1849
- City Council Ward: 9

Government
  - Council Member: Jason Chavez

Area
  - Total: 0.375 sq mi (0.97 km^{2})

Population (2020)
  - Total: 5,208
  - Density: 13,900/sq mi (5,360/km^{2})
- Time zone: UTC-6 (CST)
  - Summer (DST): UTC-5 (CDT)
- ZIP code: 55404, 55407
- Area code: 612

Historical population
Census	Pop.	Note	%±
2000	4,118		—
2010	4,782		16.1%
2020	5,208		8.9%

Midtown Phillips is a neighborhood within the Phillips community in Minneapolis, Minnesota, United States. Its boundaries are East 24th Street to the north, Bloomington Avenue to the east, East Lake Street to the south, and Chicago Avenue to the west.

The community is primarily residential by land use, and is home to over 4,700 residents from diverse backgrounds, according to the 2010 Census. It is a part of Ward 9, currently represented by city council member Jason Chavez.

== Education ==
Stewart Park and Andersen United School are located in the core of Midtown Phillips. According to niche.com, Andersen School has 1,086 students in grades PK and K-8. According to state standards, 28% of students at this school are considered proficient in math or reading. According to the McKnight Foundation website, Andersen United School has a student body which is 95% low income, or students of color, or bilingual.

== Landmarks and attractions ==
Prominent employers include the Children's Hospital of Minnesota Minneapolis location, Abbot Northwestern Hospital, and Allina Healthcare Services. Approximately 11,800 people work in Midtown Phillips, according to the 2010 Census. Cultural institutions include the Midtown Global Market, Saint Paul's Church, Abubakar As-Sadique Islamic Center, and the Heart of the Beast Theater.

The $189 million redevelopment of the vacant Sears building at Chicago Avenue and Lake Street into a mixed-use development of offices, hotel, retail and housing located in Midtown Phillips called the Midtown Exchange is one of the most important projects undertaken in Minneapolis in recent times.

Health institutions in Midtown Phillips include Abbott Northwestern Hospital, Children's Hospital of Minnesota, Allina Health, and numerous private practices. Chicago Avenue, which borders the west end of Midtown Phillips, was proclaimed a wellness corridor by the Minneapolis adapted corridor plan titled the Chicago Avenue Corridor Plan.

== Demographics ==
Race/ethnicity
Race/ethnicity	2000		2010		2020	
Race/ethnicity	Number	%	Number	%	Number	%
White alone	1,036	25.16	1,085	22.69	1,098	21.08
Black alone	956	23.22	1,183	24.74	1,784	34.25
Hispanic or Latino (any race)	1,065	25.86	1,949	40.76	1,883	36.16
Native American alone	454	11.02	264	5.52	138	2.65
Asian alone	354	8.60	123	2.57	90	1.73
Other race alone	21	0.51	11	0.23	40	0.77
Pacific Islander alone	8	0.19	10	0.21	0	0.00
Two or more races	224	5.44	157	3.28	175	3.36
Total	4,118	100.0	4,782	100.0	5,208	100.0

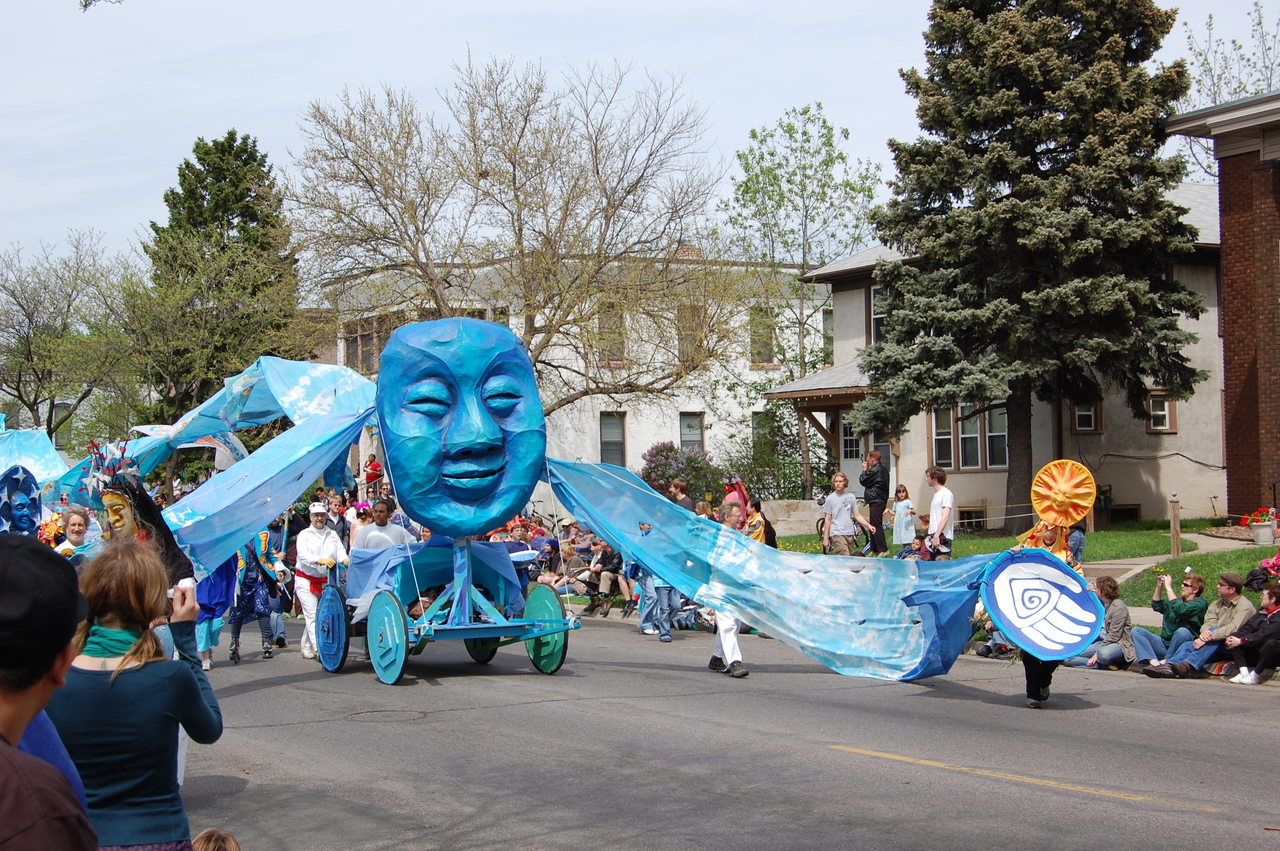
May Day Parade

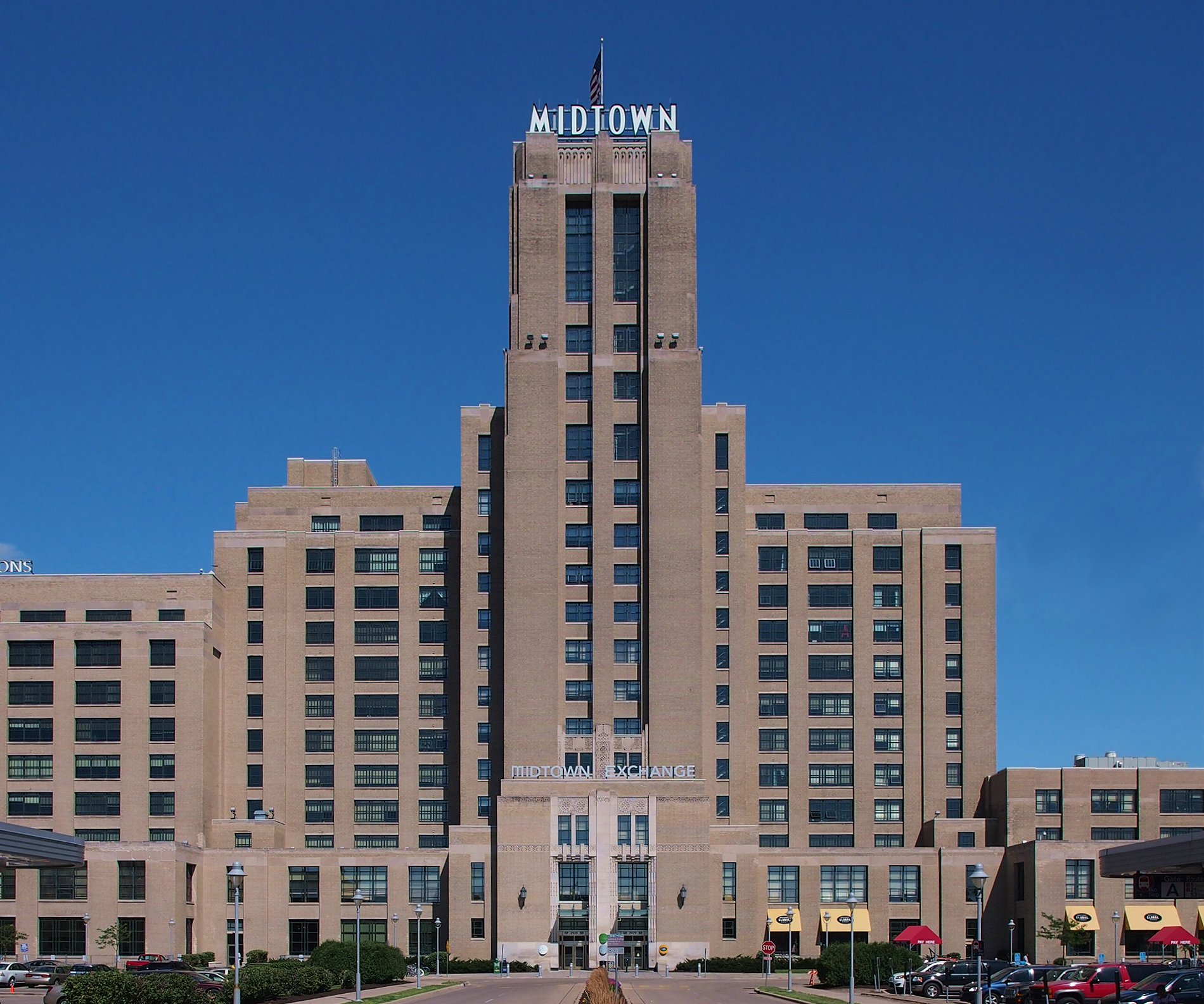
The Midtown Exchange

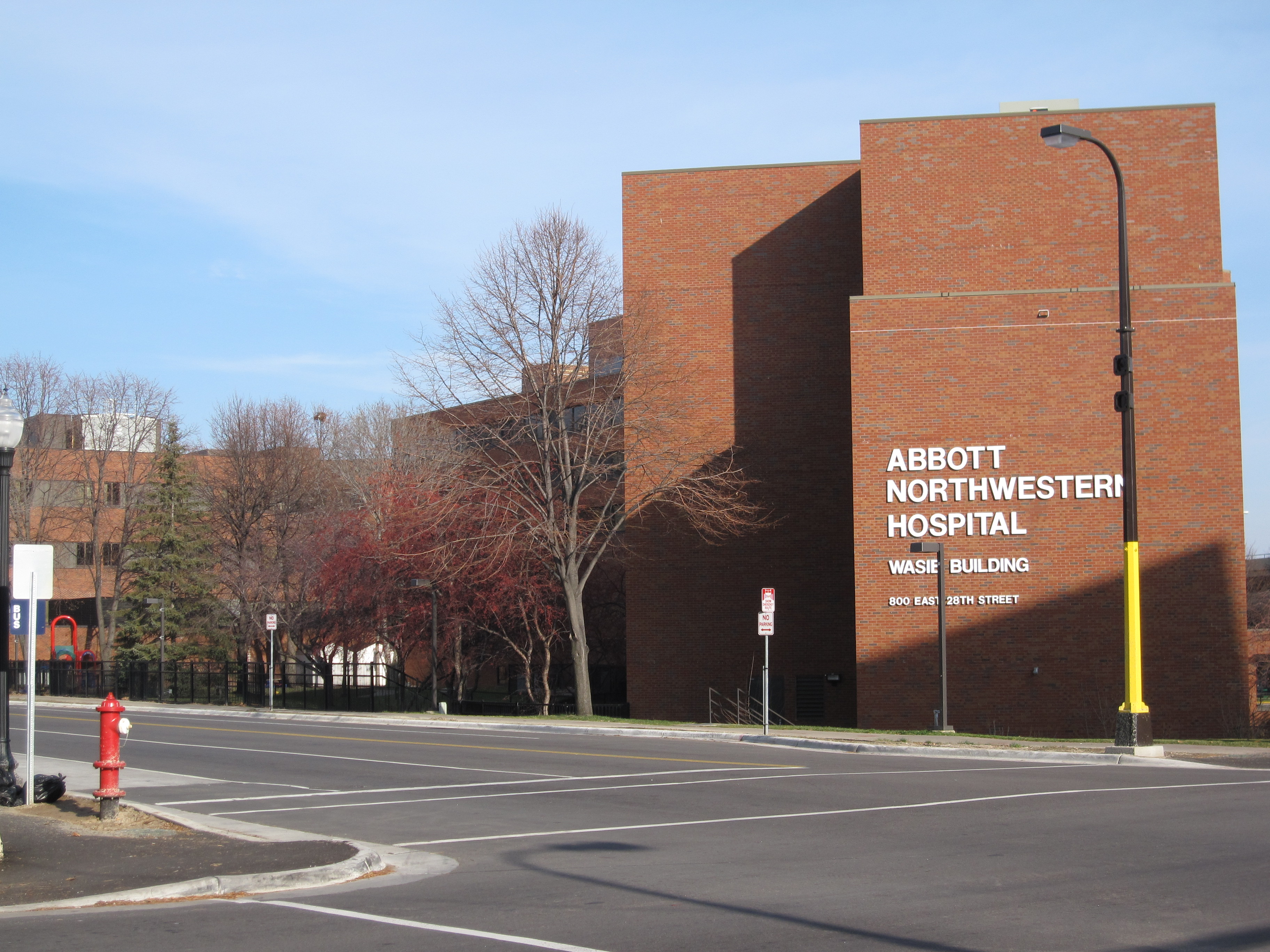
Abbott Northwestern Hospital
