= Martin Olav Sabo Bridge =

Suspension bridge for a shared-use path in Minneapolis

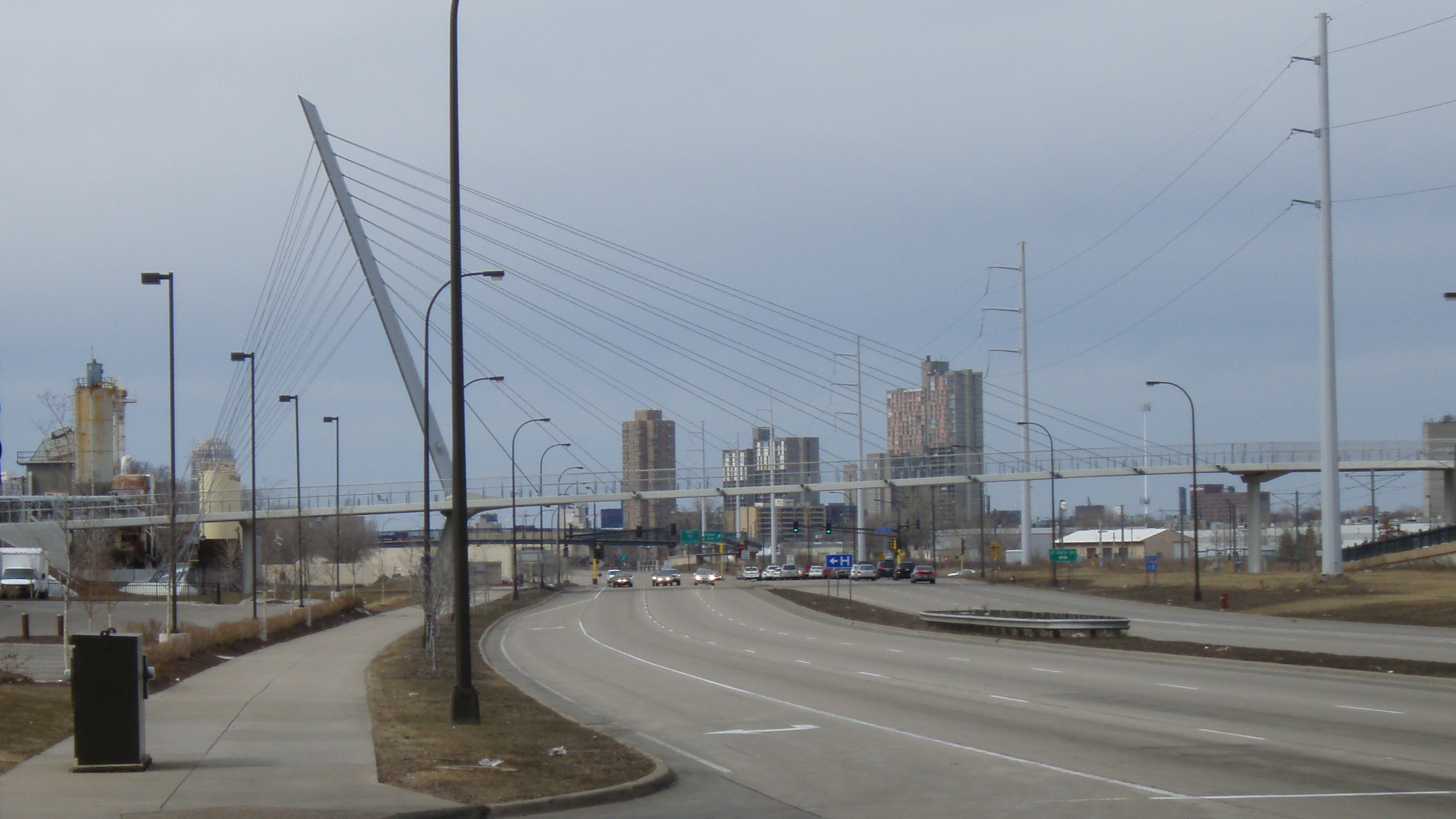
- The Martin Olav Sabo Bridge viewed from the south, from around 28th Street.
- Coordinates: 44°57′17″N 93°14′33″W
- Carries: Pedestrian and bicycle
- Crosses: Minnesota State Highway 55 (Hiawatha Avenue) and METRO Blue Line
- Locale: Minneapolis
- Official name: Martin Olav Sabo Bridge
- Maintained by: Minneapolis Public Works

Characteristics
- Design: cable-stayed suspension
- Total length: 2,200 feet (671 m)
- Height: 100 feet (30 m)
- Longest span: 220 feet (67 m)

History
- Opened: Ribbon cutting November 8, 2007, at 4:00PM CDT

Location
- Interactive map of Martin Olav Sabo Bridge

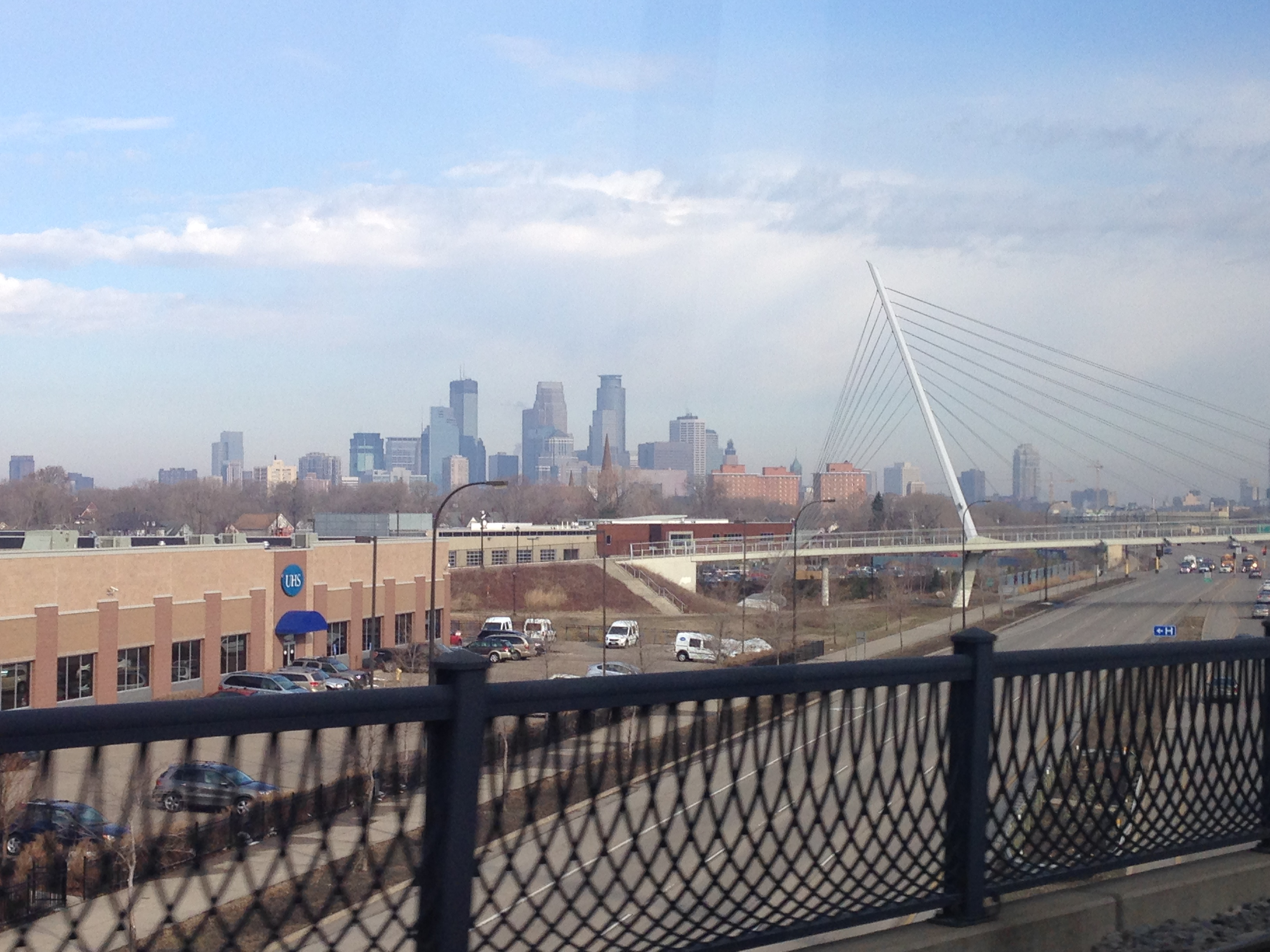
Downtown Minneapolis and the Martin Olav Sabo Bridge from the Hiawatha Avenue bridge over Lake Street, on the METRO Blue Line light rail train.

The Martin Olav Sabo Bridge is a bridge in the city of Minneapolis and the first cable-stayed suspension bridge in the U.S. state of Minnesota. Formerly the Midtown Greenway Pedestrian Bridge, it was renamed in honor of former Representative Martin Olav Sabo, a fourteen-term member of Congress from Minnesota.

Opened and dedicated in November 2007, the bridge crosses Hiawatha Avenue (Trunk Highway 55) north of 28th Street East and just south of 26th Street East, joining Phase 2 and Phase 3 of the Minneapolis Midtown Greenway at Hiawatha Avenue, allowing a continuous biking connection across the city. The bridge also links Longfellow community (Longfellow and Seward neighborhoods) to Phillips community (East Phillips neighborhood), and connects users to the north-south Hiawatha LRT Trail and Little Earth Trail.

The bridge was built by Hennepin County and transferred to the City of Minneapolis, which owns and maintains the bridge.

The bridge was closed on February 20, 2012 when two of the cables that support the bridge fell due to cracks in their attachment points; additional significant cracks were subsequently found in two other support plates. The bridge, supported with temporary bracing, was reopened June 1, 2012. A summary report of the failure analysis released June 8, 2012 determined that unaccounted for wind-induced cable vibrations led to the failures of the attachment points. The bridge was again closed for repairs on September 23, 2012. Repairs were completed, and the bridge reopened, on November 19, 2012.

== Configuration ==
The bridge eliminates the need for bicyclists and pedestrians to cross busy Hiawatha Avenue with a stoplight at grade-level. Instead, the bridge rises one block north, over the highway, and back south, to a grade-level crossing of 28th Street East just west of Hiawatha. There is also an at-grade crossing at Hiawatha.

== Structure ==
The bridge has a total length of 2,200 feet. Its main span passes 220 feet over Hiawatha Avenue, with the cable-stay tower rising 100 feet above the bridge-deck level. The Martin Olav Sabo Bridge is the first true cable-stayed suspension bridge in the State of Minnesota. Its design was the product of engineering consulting firm URS, with community input.

== History ==
During Congressman Martin Olav Sabo's tenure, he earmarked $2.9 million in federal funding to the project. He is also recognized for acquiring federal funding to complete many capital improvements throughout Minneapolis. City advisory boards and committees forwarded the recommendation to rename the bridge after Sabo in 2005, which was done by the City Council. Hennepin County provided additional funding to total $5.1 million for the final project.

== 2012 structural failures ==
Late on the night of February 19, 2012, the two longest support cables on the bridge were found detached and lying across the bridge deck below. The bridge was closed shortly thereafter to all traffic. The portion of Hiawatha Avenue that passes underneath the bridge was also closed, and light rail service was suspended on the tracks that pass beneath the bridge.

The light rail resumed service on February 24, 2012, after emergency supports were placed underneath the bridge and a second pair of cables were removed due to cracks in their anchor points. Hiawatha Avenue was reopened to traffic underneath the bridge on February 27, 2012.

The original cable failure was due to cracks in diaphragm plates that anchor the ends of the cables to the steel tower, and significant cracks have subsequently been found in three of those anchorages. The engineering firm Wiss, Janney, Elstner Associates, Inc. was hired to investigate how the diaphragm plates became compromised. On June 8, 2012, a summary report of the investigation was released in which the failure was attributed to wind-induced "cable vibrations that induce damaging stress range cycles at fatigue sensitive details in the cable diaphragm plates." The effect of cable vibrations caused by wind was not included in the original design package for the bridge.

The bridge reopened for bicycle and pedestrian traffic on June 1, 2012, with temporary support structures in place. New plates were designed, and the bridge was closed once more between September 23, 2012, and November 19, 2012, to allow them to be retrofitted as permanent repairs.

== 2023 Repairs ==
An inspection in 2020 found voids and rusting in the concrete around two of the cable points on the side of the bridge. Starting on May 15, 2023 and completing in September, 2023, the cable points were reinforced by adding steel reinforcements to the anchors. During the repairs, traffic below the bridge on Hiawatha Ave S was reduced to one or two lanes.
