= East Phillips Neighborhood Institute =

- Date: 2014–present
- Location: Minneapolis, Minnesota, United States
- Also known as: EPNI
- Cause: Environmental racism against minorities
- Motive: Anti-racism and environmental protection
- Outcome: Multiple protests in Minneapolis; Numerous arrests of protestors

The East Phillips Neighborhood Institute (EPNI) is a social movement that was established to identify and highlight pollutant concerns and the risks of proposed construction projects within the East Phillips neighborhood of Minneapolis, Minnesota. The movement was founded in 2014, initially, to address relocation efforts of two factories within the neighborhood that were considered sources of pollution. Upon learning that the city intended to purchase a different site within East Phillips to construct a public works truck facility, EPNI refocused their efforts to stop the construction from occurring.

Activists representing the neighborhood have argued that construction would result in significant arsenic exposure to its residents, who already experience elevated levels of asthma and heart conditions. With the demographic of its residents belonging mostly to minority groups, activists have used the proposed project as evidence of the city implementing environmental racism. The city, however, disagrees with EPNI's findings and states that the project would be developed in a safe manner.

== Organization ==
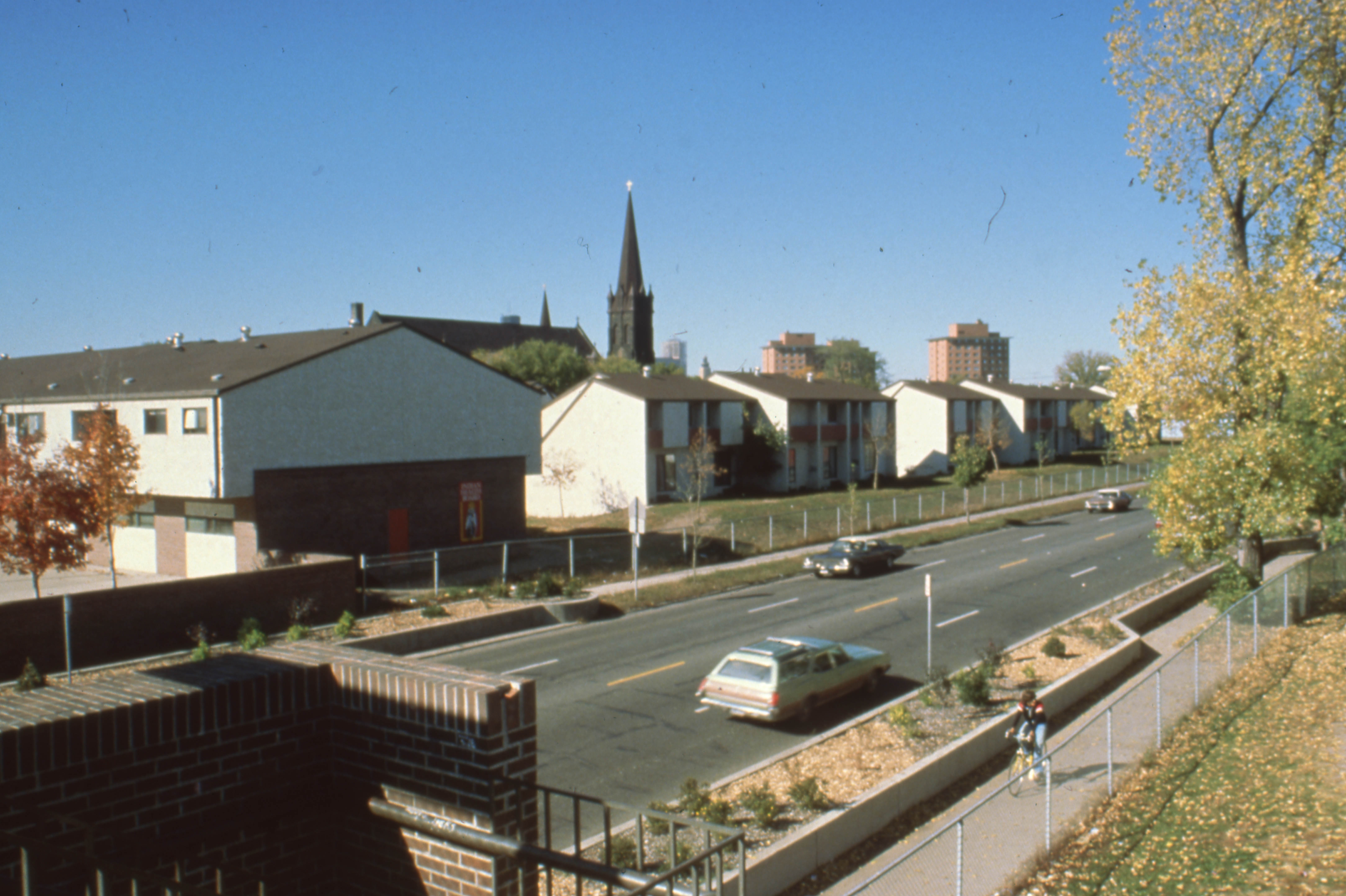
A photograph of the East Phillips neighborhood in 1980.

Historically, the demographics of the East Phillips neighborhood are primarily minority-dominated, with a large percentage of its residents belonging to Little Earth, a community of indigenous Americans. Activists in support of the institute have stated that the neighborhood's residents have been subject to environmental racism, citing reports that they experience elevated levels of asthma and cardiovascular disease. Additionally, the neighborhood has been recognized for being the poorest in the city, with approximately 48 percent of its residents living below the poverty threshold as of 2016. In 2016, the city of Minneapolis expressed interest in purchasing a site within the neighborhood, formerly used as a production warehouse by Sears and colloquially referred to as the Roof Depot, to construct a new waterworks and trucking facility. Dr. Nathan Chomilo, the medical director for the state's Medicaid chapter, used the project as evidence of the city deliberately introducing structural racism within the community.

While focusing their efforts on attempting to relocate Bituminous Roadways and Smith Foundry, an asphalt plant and iron foundry, respectively, EPNI learned of the city's demolition plans for the Roof Depot, and refocused the subject of their activism. As a result, the neighborhood proposed a large-scale urban farm project at the site. The neighborhood's president, architect Dean Dovolis, suggested that rather than deconstructing the current building, it could be revitalized with "green architecture [and] a green community with jobs, local ownership and opportunity". Among Dovolis' other visions for the space included a community market and suitable housing for the homeless. Minneapolis ultimately purchased the site in 2016, but construction attempts on-site have been halted for years.

== History and timeline ==
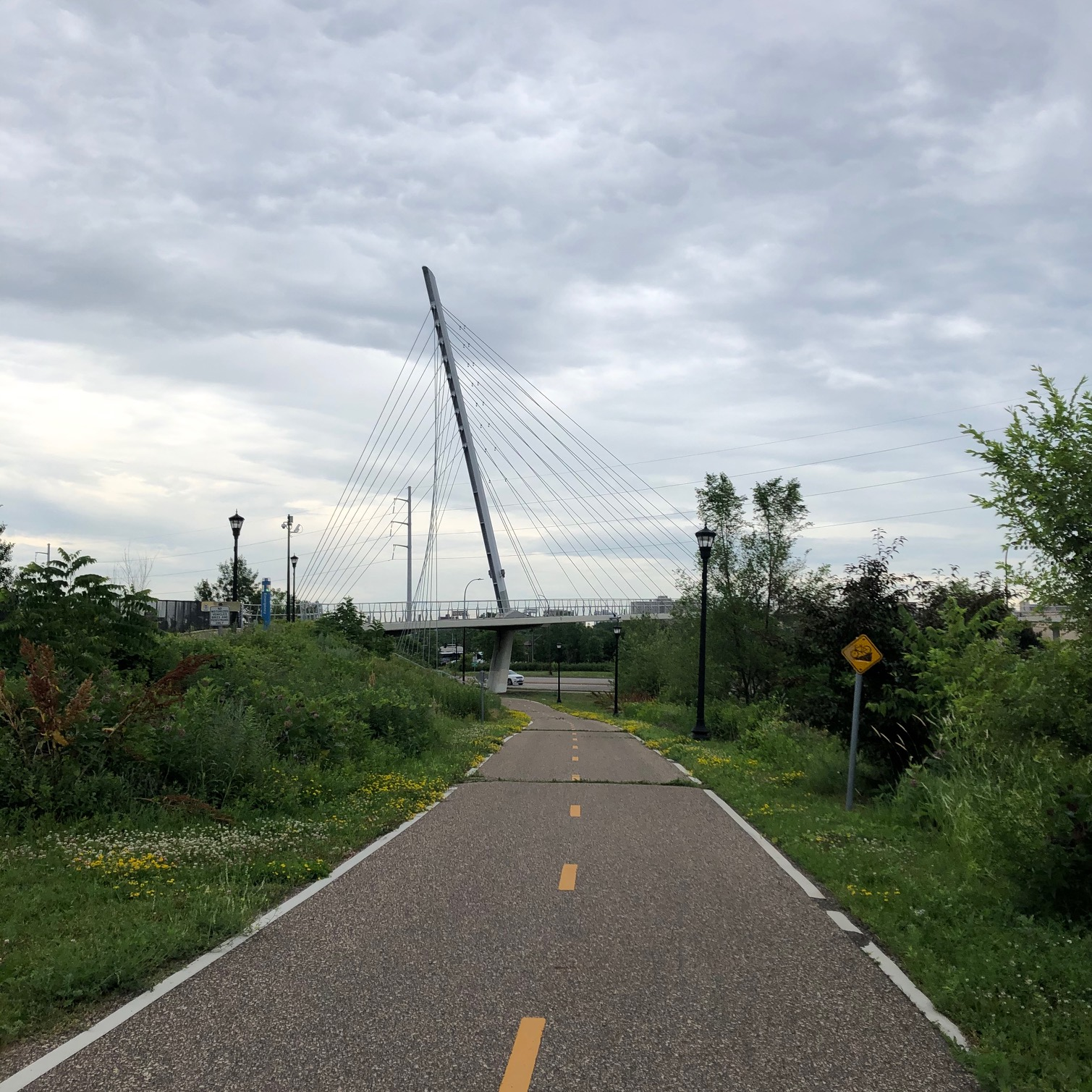
Large amount of arsenic trioxide were discovered in areas surrounding the East Phillips neighborhood during construction of adjacent transportation modes in the 1990s.

Throughout 2022 and 2023, several city council meetings concerning the fate of the Roof Depot were interrupted by protestors seeking to bring attention to the site's listing as a Superfund project. The formal listing, South Minneapolis Residential Soil Contamination, was made after discovering higher than average amounts of arsenic in both local soil and groundwater during nearby construction projects in 1994; the arsenic was traced back to the site's use as a pesticide manufacturing plant in the 1960s, when U.S. Borax operated and leased the structure. According to the United States Environmental Protection Agency, arsenic trioxide would be released into the neighboring East Phillips residences during heavy winds. In 2007, the South Minneapolis Residential Soil Contamination listing was added to the National Priorities list, and clean-up pursuits continued from 2009 to 2011, with its US$20 million funding stemming from the then recently-passed American Recovery and Reinvestment Act of 2009.

On February 24, 2023, a judge ruled to stall any construction attempts at the site until an appeals court decision could be made, which delayed the city's initial demolition attempts. EPNI considered the ruling to be a win, but were required to cooperate with city officials and avoid trespassing as part of the decision; they issued the following statement: "This month's huge swell of support shows a clear path forward for East Phillips, a path towards healing past environmental injustices and ensuring a healthier future for residents." During the same month, activists occupied the roof depot site, still owned by the city, resulting in several arrests and three city council members requesting legal action due to threats and intimidation. Minneapolis police arrested six protestors at this time and issued a warning claiming that the property was "not safe for individuals to congregate at and anyone on the site is trespassing". Robin Wonsley, a Minneapolis city official who agrees with EPNI, stated the city's desire to transform the site "continues to show just how disconnected city leadership is from the realities of working-class people. Leaders in this city think that this course of action is good for everyone involved, while it's our residents who are fearful that the city is literally about to poison them." In response, Minneapolis Public Works Director Margaret Anderson Kelliher stated: "We would not be going forward with this project if the city of Minneapolis did not believe it was a safe project and a project that is going to improve the area."

In April 2023, an open letter was presented to city officials, with signatures from over 270 local medical professionals arguing that the construction of the public works facility would result in substantial environmental pollution; the City of Minneapolis' sustainability division had previously recognized that the addition of diesel trucks would raise emissions locally. Following a meeting with Minneapolis city officials on April 19, the city agreed to sell the site of the Roof Depot to EPNI for US$16.7 million, with state assistance, under the conditions that the neighborhood would be the sole purchaser. The neighborhood would have until May 22 of that year, the end of the current legislative session, to make their decision.
