= Little Earth Trail =

Shared-use path in Minneapolis

Coordinates: 44.9557°N 93.2434°W

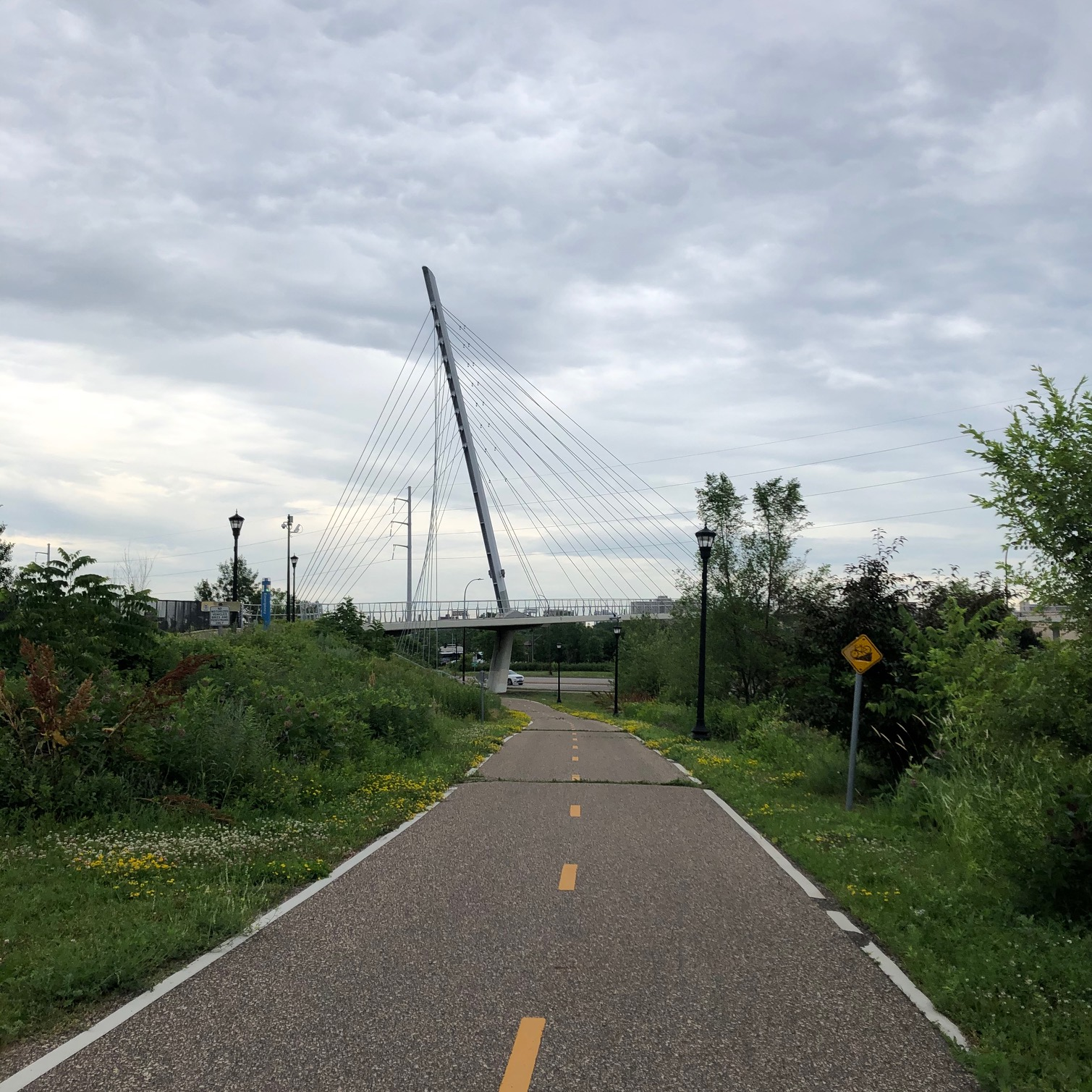
- Southern entrance to Little Earth Trail in Minneapolis, June 2020.
- Length: 1 mi (1.6 km)
- Location: Minneapolis, Minnesota, United States
- Trailheads: Franklin Avenue/16th Avenue South (north); Midtown Greenway (south)
- Use: Cycling, Pedestrians
- Season: Year-round
- Sights: City skyline views
- Hazards: Traffic intersections
- Surface: Concrete and asphalt

Little Earth Trail is an approximately 1-mile (1.6 km), multi-use bicycle path in Minneapolis, Minnesota, United States, that links several neighborhoods, parks, businesses, and trails in the Phillips community. The trail begins at its northern end near the intersection of East Franklin Avenue and 16th Avenue South and eventually follows the west side of Hiawatha Avenue to the Midtown Greenway and Martin Olav Sabo Bridge. Named after the nearby Little Earth community, the shared-use pathway provides transportation and recreation opportunities, and is a frequent location of activism on social justice issues in Minneapolis.

== Route description ==
Little Earth trail is located entirely within the Phillips community, running along the easternmost edge of its East Phillips and Ventura Village neighborhoods. The northern terminus of the trail is near many businesses and services on East Franklin Avenue. Going southward, the trail follows the Hiawatha Avenue transit corridor to East Phillips Park. At that point, cyclists and pedestrians can cross over the Hiawatha Avenue transit corridor eastward on a non-vehicular traffic bridge, and connect to East 24th Street, Hiawatha LRT Trail, and the nearby Franklin Avenue Station. If continuing southward on Little Earth Trail, people are able to connect to the Midtown Greenway trail, and the Martin Olav Sabo Bridge offers trail users another opportunity to cross the Hiawatha Avenue transit corridor eastward. After reaching Little Earth Trail's southern terminus, people can reach Lake Street/Midtown Station or continue southward past East Lake Street on Hiawatha LRT Trail.

== History of the trail ==
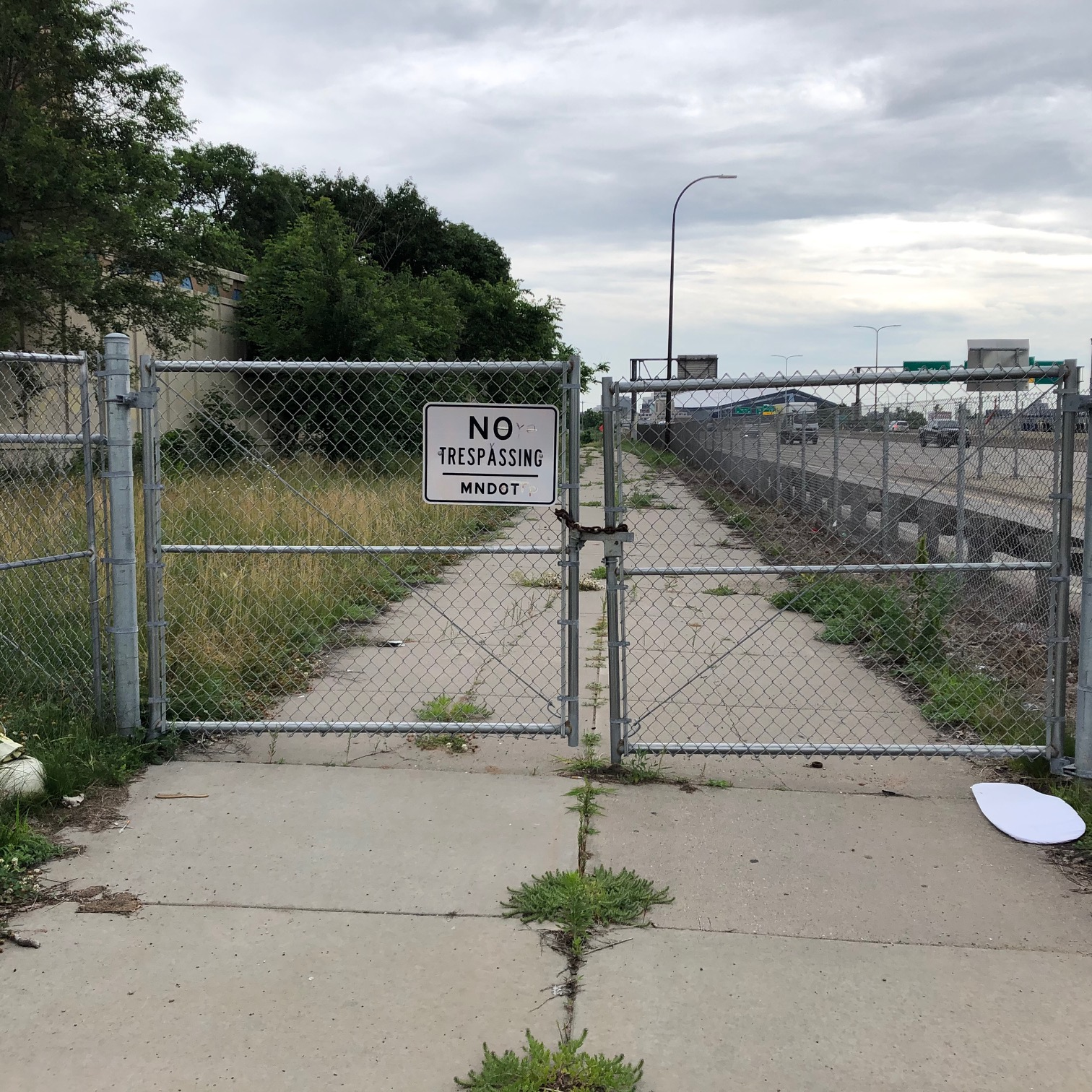
Northern portion of Little Earth Trail in Minneapolis closed at East 22nd Street, June 2020

The name of the trail is borrowed from the Little Earth community in Minneapolis, a 9.4 acre, 212-unit housing complex at approximately East 24th Street and Cedar Avenue that is home to nearly 1,000 residents.

Construction of Hiawatha Avenue in 1999 included a 12-foot (3.7 m) wide, shared-use path along the west side of the highway, which was later named and signed as Little Earth Trail. As part the broader Midtown Minneapolis trail system, it serves as an important conduit for people to move through neighborhoods and reach community and regional destinations. In the 2010s, the City of Minneapolis included Little Earth Trail in its efforts to improve signage and amenities for mixed-use paths.

In 2018, Little Earth Trail was the location of a sprawling 70-tent, 120-person homeless camp that represented social problems in the area, such as historic displacement of American Indian people, lack of affordable housing, and ineffective social services. The camp along Hiawatha Avenue closed in December 2019. Some grassy areas next to the trail were fenced off with "NO TRESPASSING" signs, but portions of Little Earth Trail remained open to bicyclists and pedestrians. People in the Phillips community refer to the area as "The Wall of Forgotten Natives," which literally represents a large, concrete sound barrier along the Hiawatha Avenue transit corridor and the issues facing former camp residents.

In 2019, opioid harm reductionists hung a banner on the 24th Street bridge from Little Earth Trail to advocate for safe use spaces in Minneapolis.

== See also ==
- Hennepin County
- List of shared-use paths in Minneapolis
- Metro Transit
- Minnesota Department of Transportation
