= László Szabó =

László Szabó may refer to:

== Sportspeople ==
- László Szabó (canoeist) (1953–2016), Hungarian sprint canoer
- László Szabó (fencer), Hungarian fencing master
- László Szabó (footballer) (born 1989), Hungarian football defender
- László Szabó (handballer, born 1946) (1946–2024), Hungarian handball player who competed in the 1972 Olympics
- László Szabó (handballer, born 1955) (1955–2017), Hungarian handball player who competed in the 1980 and 1988 Olympics
- László Szabó (motorcyclist) (1934–2020), Hungarian Grand Prix motorcycle road racer
- László Szabó (rower) (1908–1992), Hungarian Olympic rower
- László Szabó (wrestler) (1946–2010), Hungarian wrestler

== Other people ==
- László Szabó (actor) (born 1936), Hungarian actor, film director and screenwriter
- László Szabó (chess player) (1917–1998), Hungarian chess grandmaster
- László Szabó (diplomat) (born 1965), Hungarian diplomat and politician
- László Rác Szabó (born 1957), ethnic Hungarian politician in Serbia
- Lajos Szabó a founder of the Budapest Dialogical School

== See also ==
- Szabó
