= Ferenc Szabó =

Ferenc Szabó can refer to:

- Ferenc Szabó (composer) (1902–1969), Hungarian composer
- Ferenc Szabó (footballer, 1921–2009), Hungarian footballer
- Ferenc Szabó (footballer, born 1956), Hungarian footballer
- Ferenc Szabó (judoka) (1948–2025), Hungarian Olympic judoka
- Károly Ferenc Szabó (1943–2011), Romanian politician
