= Phillips, Minneapolis =

Community of Minneapolis

Coordinates: 44.9583°N 93.2538°W

Phillips
- Community
- Mosaic benches at Peavey Field Park

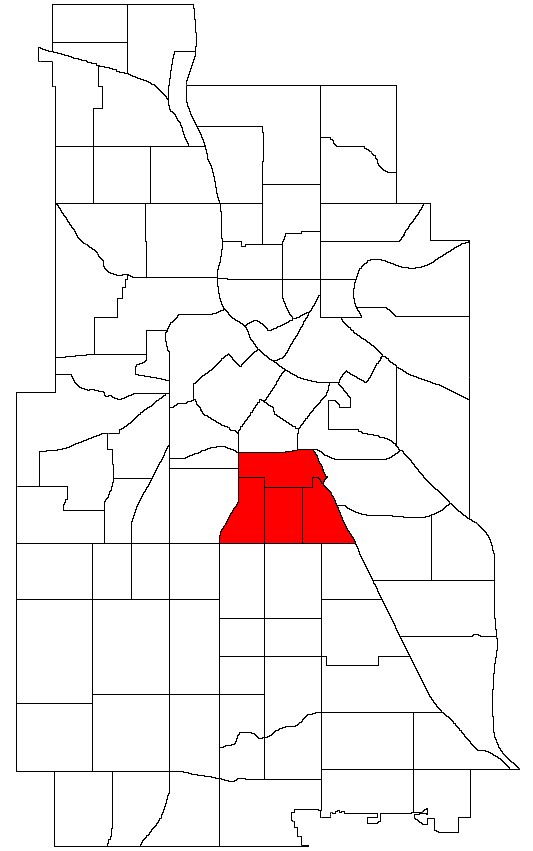
- Location of Phillips within the U.S. city of Minneapolis
- Interactive map of Phillips
- Country: United States
- State: Minnesota
- County: Hennepin
- City: Minneapolis
- Established: 1849
- City Council Wards: 6, 9
- Neighborhoods: List: East Phillips; Midtown Phillips; Phillips West; Ventura Village

Government
  - Council Member, Ward 6: Jamal Osman
  - Council Member, Ward 9: Jason Chavez

Area
  - Total: 1.569 sq mi (4.06 km^{2})

Population (2020)
  - Total: 22,218
  - Density: 14,160/sq mi (5,467/km^{2})
- Time zone: UTC-6 (CST)
  - Summer (DST): UTC-5 (CDT)
- ZIP code: 55404, 55407, 55408
- Area code: 612

Historical population
Census	Pop.	Note	%±
1980	17,413		—
1990	17,247		−1.0%
2000	19,805		14.8%
2010	20,315		2.6%
2020	22,218		9.4%

Phillips is a community in Minneapolis, just south of downtown. Traditionally, it was both a community and a neighborhood (in Minneapolis, a neighborhood is a subdivision of a community). Phillips is a diverse area in many ways: its population includes people of many nationalities; it has a mix of residential, commercial and industrial uses; and it is home to several large employers such as Abbott Northwestern Hospital, Wells Fargo Mortgage and Allina Health Care Services, along with small neighborhood businesses.

== History ==
On May 9, 2002, Phillips neighborhood was subdivided into four smaller neighborhoods. The official neighborhoods are now known as Ventura Village, Phillips West, East Phillips, and Midtown Phillips. Though not an officially designated neighborhood, Phillips also includes the Little Earth residential area. The boundaries of the Phillips community are Interstate 94 to the north, Hiawatha Avenue to the east, Lake Street to the south, and Interstate 35W to the west.

Phillips contains part of City Council Ward 6, represented by Jamal Osman, and Ward 9, represented by Jason Chavez.

The neighborhood was named after Wendell Phillips, a 19th century abolitionist. It was in this neighborhood that the American Indian Movement was founded in 1968.

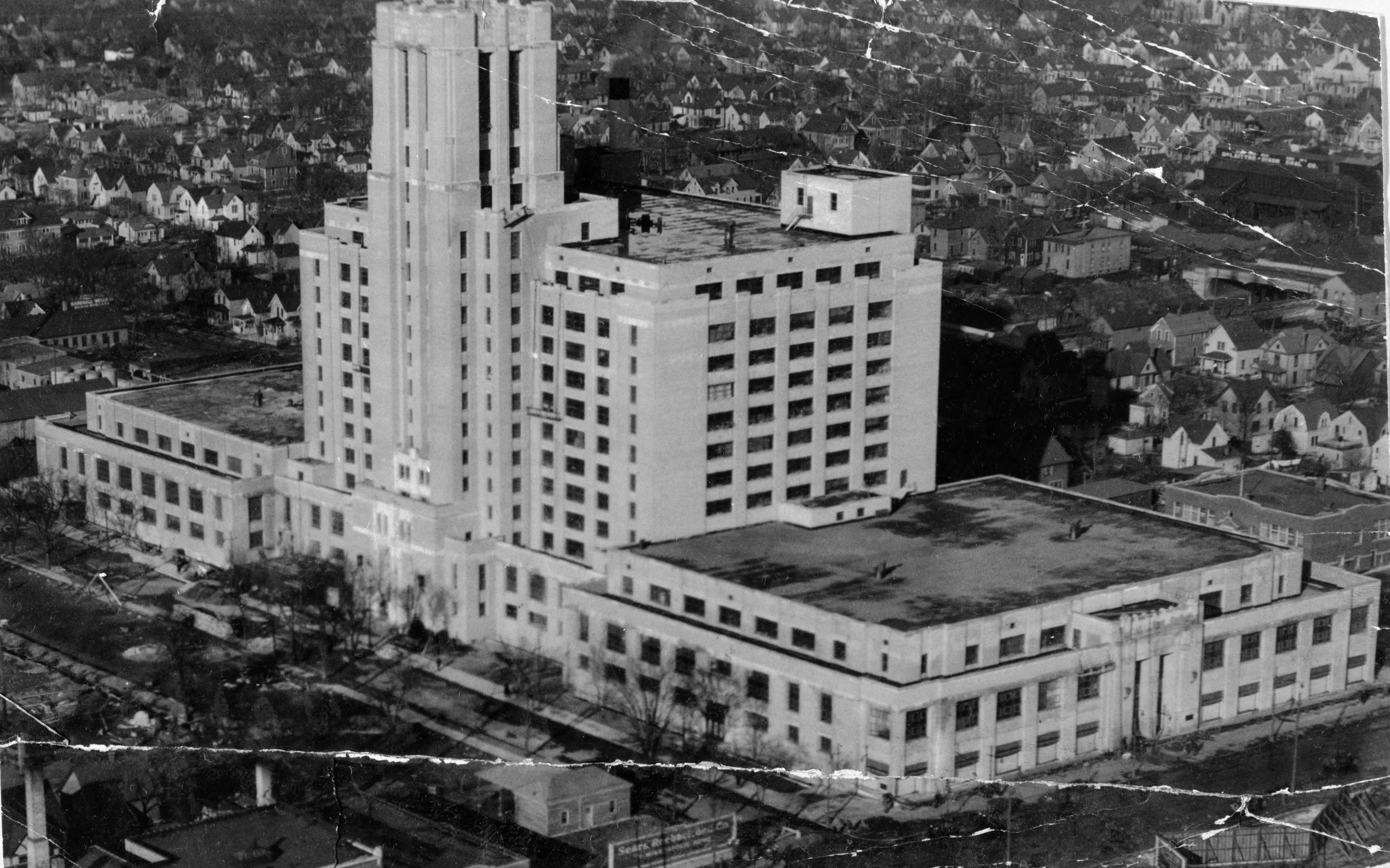
Aerial view of the Sears building on Lake Street just after completion in 1928.

The $189 million redevelopment of the vacant Sears building at Chicago Avenue and Lake Street into a mixed-use development of offices, hotel, retail and housing located in Midtown Phillips is one of the most important projects undertaken in the city in recent times. At the east side of the community, along the Hiawatha Avenue transit corridor, the Little Earth Trail connects many smaller neighborhoods, parks, businesses, and multi-use trails.
