= Zoltán Szabó =

Zoltán Szabó may refer to:

- Zoltán Szabó (botanist) (1882–1944), floristics, plant systematics, plant physiology
- Zoltán Szabó (mathematician) (born 1965), Hungarian mathematician and professor at Princeton University
- Zoltán Szabó (Minister of Defence) (1858–1934), Hungarian politician and Minister of Defence of Hungary
- Zoltán Szabó (surgeon) (1929–2015), Hungarian cardiac surgeon
- Zoltan Sabo (born 1972), Serbian-born Hungarian football manager and retired player
- Zoltán Szabó (footballer, born 1980), Hungarian football player
- Zoltán Szabó (serial killer), Hungarian serial killer
