= Ventura Village, Minneapolis =

Neighborhood of Phillips, Minneapolis

Coordinates: 44.9617°N 93.2579°W

Ventura Village
- Neighborhood
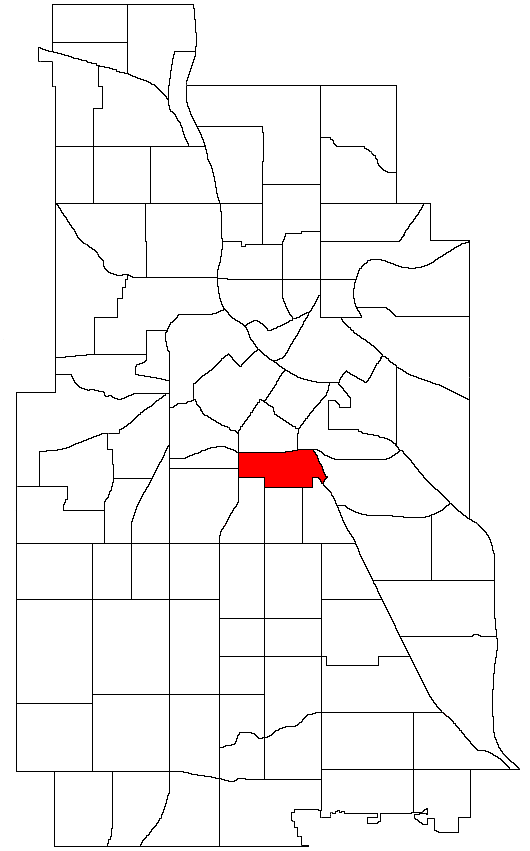
- Location of Ventura Village within the U.S. city of Minneapolis
- Interactive map of Ventura Village
- Country: United States
- State: Minnesota
- County: Hennepin
- City: Minneapolis
- Community: Phillips
- Founded: 1849
- City Council Ward: 6

Government
  - Council Member: Jamal Osman

Population (2020)
  - Total: 7,050
- Time zone: UTC-6 (CST)
  - Summer (DST): UTC-5 (CDT)
- ZIP code: 55404
- Area code: 612

Historical population
Census	Pop.	Note	%±
2000	6,769		—
2010	6,537		−3.4%
2020	7,050		7.8%

Ventura Village is a neighborhood in Minneapolis's Phillips community. Its boundaries are Interstate 35W to the west, Interstate 94 (including the I-94/I-35W bottleneck) to the north, and Hiawatha Avenue to the east. The southern boundary runs (from west to east) along East 22nd Street from I-35W to Chicago Avenue, along East 24th Street from Chicago Avenue to 17th Avenue South, and then back up to 22nd Street from 17th Avenue to Hiawatha Avenue (this portion is only about a block long). Franklin Avenue, which runs east–west, is the neighborhood's main commercial artery.

Ventura Village is in Minneapolis City Council Ward 6, represented by Jamal Osman.

== Demographics ==
As of 2020, the population of Ventura Village was 7,050, split 51.0% male and 49.0% female. 5,160 were of voting age. 58.6% of residents were at least a high school graduate (or equivalent), and 14.5% had earned a bachelor's degree or higher.

37.3% of the population were foreign-born residents, and 57.6% spoke a language other than English at home. According to the American Community Survey's 2016-2020 five-year estimate, the top non-English languages spoken in Ventura Village were Spanish (spoken by 18.2% of the population), Somali (6.1%), Oromo (2.2%), Amharic (1.7%), and Vietnamese (1.3%). 34.1% of residents spoke English less than "very well".

36.1% of households had no access to a vehicle. Among workers age 16 and older, 60.0% commuted to work via car, 16.9% used public transit, and 23.0% walked, biked, worked at home, or used some other method. The median household income was $32,131. 37.9% of residents lived below the poverty line, and 9.0% were unemployed. 84.4% of housing in the neighborhood was renter-occupied.

Race/ethnicity
Race/ethnicity	2000		2010		2020	
Race/ethnicity	Number	%	Number	%	Number	%
White alone	1,631	24.10	1,424	21.78	1,312	18.61
Black alone	2,282	33.71	2,738	41.88	3,676	52.14
Hispanic or Latino (any race)	1,295	19.13	1,549	23.70	1,222	17.33
Native American alone	640	9.45	413	6.32	367	5.21
Asian alone	295	4.36	136	2.08	145	2.06
Other race alone	11	0.16	27	0.41	53	0.75
Pacific Islander alone	6	0.09	2	0.03	10	0.14
Two or more races	609	9.00	248	3.79	265	3.76
Total	6,769	100.0	6,537	100.0	7,050	100.0
