= István Szabó (disambiguation) =

István Szabó is a Hungarian film director.

István Szabó may also refer to:

- István P. Szabó (born 1972), Hungarian filmmaker and writer
- István Szabó (footballer, born 1967), Hungarian football manager
- István Szabó (handballer) (born 1950), former Hungarian handball player
- István Szabó (canoeist) (born 1950), Hungarian sprint canoeist
- István Szabó de Nagyatád (1863–1924), Hungarian politician
