= Sabo =

Sabo may refer to:

== People ==
- Sabo (street artist)
- Sabo Bobaljević
- Sabo Romo, musician
- Albert F. Sabo (1920–2002), judge
- Chris Sabo (born 1962), baseball player
- Dave Sabo (born 1964), musician
- Erik Sabo (born 1991), Slovak footballer
- Jean-Philippe Sabo (born 1987), French footballer
- John P. Sabo (1900-1958), American college football and basketball coach
- László Rác Szabó
- Leslie H. Sabo, Jr., Medal of Honor recipient
- Martin Olav Sabo (1938–2016), American politician
- Michael Sabo (born 1930), identity theft consultant
- Nassirou Sabo, Nigerian politician
- Radu Sabo (born 1971), Romanian footballer
- Yozhef Sabo (born 1940), Ukrainian footballer
- Zoltan Sabo (1972–2020), Serbian footballer
- Sabo Bakin Zuwo (1934–1989), Nigerian politician

== Places ==
- Al Sabo Preserve
- Martin Olav Sabo Bridge
- Sabo Quarter, Migrant Hausa settlements in Yorubaland
- Sabo River

== Other uses ==
- Sabo, turnip milk
- Sabo, a saboteur or shortened form of sabotage
- Sabo (web series), a reality prank web series produced by Toggle, Singapore
- Sabo (One Piece), a fictional character from One Piece
