= István P. Szabó =

Istvan P. Szabo
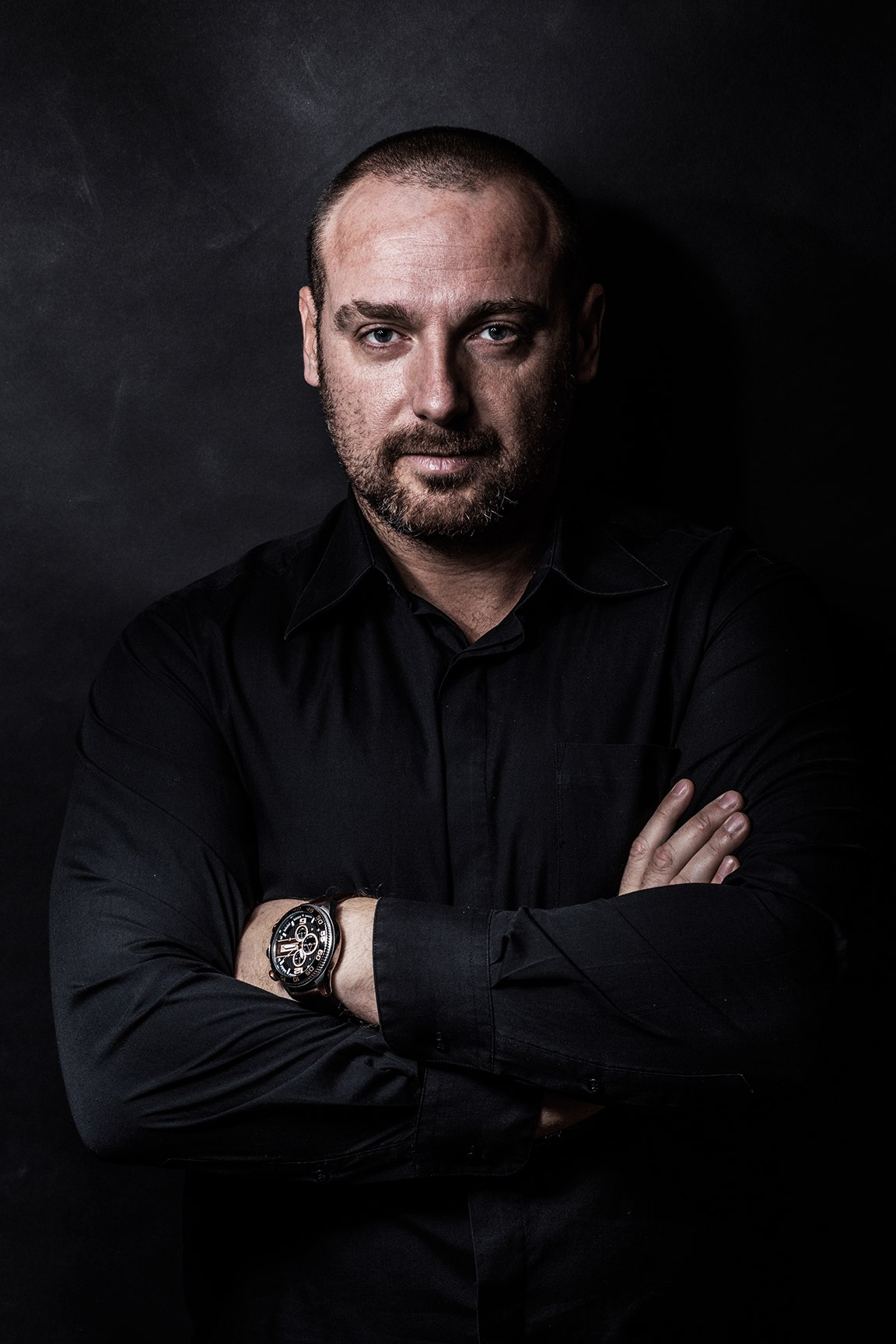
- Born: 10 December 1972 (age 53); Szolnok, Hungary
- Occupations: Film director, producer, screenwriter, writer, dancer, fitness instructor, nutritionist
- Years active: present

Istvan P. Szabo (born 10 December 1972 in Szolnok) is a Hungarian show business professional, film director, producer, screenwriter, writer, fitness instructor and nutritionist.

== Career ==
He was born as Istvan Gulyas but he decided to take his mother's (Etelka Eva Szabo) last name for family reasons. He already went by the name Istvan Szabo when he wrote his first movie screenplay (for the movie Halalkeringo, 2010). He received some negative criticism for taking the name Istvan Szabo as there is also an Academy Award winning Hungarian director with exactly the same name. As a result of this he took the middle name Peet (his former stage name) and he became Istvan P. Szabo.

He started his professional career as a dancer, choreographer, and dance instructor. He trained under such renowned artists as Iván Markó, Joe Alegado, Pál Frenák, Tamás Juronics, etc. Up until 2007 he took part in a number of Hungarian and international (predominantly French) dance productions. Between 2003 and 2010 he took courses in screenwriting (in film and television-writing), acting, journalism and film directing (both basic and master level courses).

In the 2000s he published two novels under the pseudonym Peet Goodman. He also wrote and published lyrics under the name Peet. His one-man comedy, Panelninja, has been playing in Hungarian theatres since 2012. He started his career in the television and film industry as a screenwriter for the popular Hungarian crime drama series "Tuzvonalban". He wrote and directed the movie titled "Indian", a drama with elements of dark humor. Before its Hungarian release date "Indian" was already chosen as one of the official feature films for both the "13. Hungarian Film Festival of Los Angeles" and the "Hungarian Film Week of Bucharest".

Some of his photographs

Since 2011 he has been involved in photography. Since 2012 he has been a fitness instructor. Since 2014 he was a Miami-based portrait, fashion, sport-fitness and event photographer. Then he moved to Malta and then back to Hungary. Since 2014 he is a nutritionist too. In 2018 he wrote an e-book on this topic.

== Filmography ==
- Halálkeringő / Death Waltz (Writer, 2010)
- Indián (Writer, director, producer, 2013)

.

Short

- Prelude (Writer, 2007)
- Game Over (Writer, director, actor, 2009)
- Victim (Writer, director, actor, 2010)
- From 9 to 10 (Writer, director, 2010)
- atokeletes_ferfi.blog.hu (Writer, director, 2011)
- The Girl in the Corner (Writer, director, actor, 2011)

== Sources ==
- P.hotography about, gigmasters.com

This article contains a translation of P. Szabó István from hu.wikipedia

- Szinhaz.hu/Szeged Contemporary Ballet: Délután - P. Szabó István darabja - ″Mert ez itt egy ilyen alkalom, nem!?″; 11 November 2010 (in Hungarian)
- Who is who Magyarországon 2013 - P. Szabó István (in Hungarian)
- 7ora7 P. Szabó István (in Hungarian)
- Naky: Michael Douglas vs. Robert De Niro; ZebrArt Studio > coverage March 2011 (in Hungarian)
- Fidelio.hu P. Szabó István (in Hungarian)
- vidorfest.hu Panelninja 2013 (in Hungarian)

Centrál Színház Panelninja 2013 (in Hungarian)

- 13th Hungarian Film Festival of Los Angeles Indian Oktober 2013
- Balassi Institute - Hungarian Cultural Centre Bukarest 7. Magyar Filmhét programja 2013 November (in Hungarian)
- pszaboistvan.blog.hu

Peet's lyrics 9 November 2010 (in Hungarian)

- Csapattag bemutatása: P. Szabó István, oxygenfay.hu (in Hungarian)
- Egyél rendesen!, books.google.hu; 24 February 2018 (in Hungarian)
