= East Phillips, Minneapolis =

Neighborhood of Phillips, Minneapolis

Coordinates: 44.9510°N 93.2526°W

East Phillips
- Neighborhood
- East Phillips Park

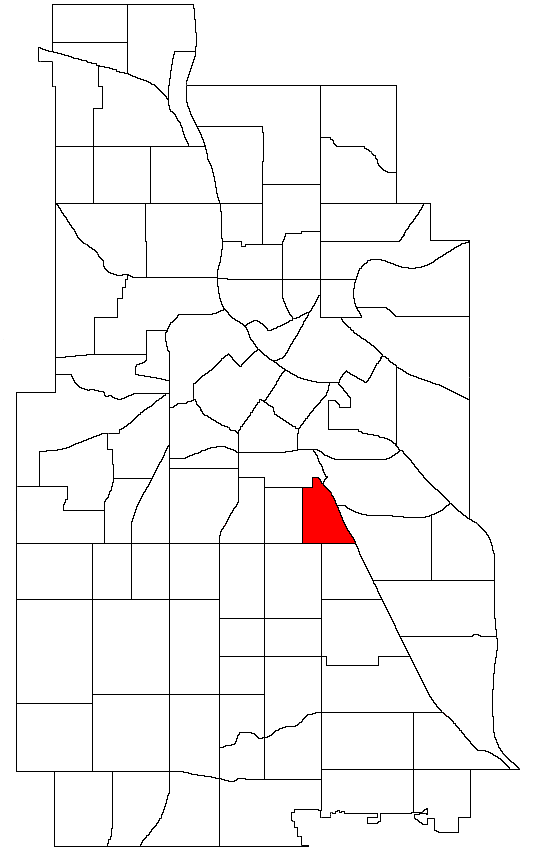
- Location of East Phillips within the U.S. city of Minneapolis
- Interactive map of East Phillips
- Country: United States
- State: Minnesota
- County: Hennepin
- City: Minneapolis
- Community: Phillips
- Founded: 1849
- City Council Ward: 9

Government
  - Council Member: Jason Chavez

Population (2020)
  - Total: 4,904
- Time zone: UTC-6 (CST)
  - Summer (DST): UTC-5 (CDT)
- ZIP code: 55404, 55407
- Area code: 612

Historical population
| Census | Pop. | Note | %± |
|---|---|---|---|
| 2000 | 4,147 | | — |
| 2010 | 4,269 | | 2.9% |
| 2020 | 4,904 | | 14.9% |

East Phillips is a neighborhood in the city of Minneapolis, Minnesota. Its northern boundary runs along East 24th Street from Bloomington Avenue to 17th Avenue South, then runs along East 22nd Street from 17th Avenue South to Little Earth Trail and Hiawatha Avenue. Its other boundaries are Hiawatha Avenue to the east, East Lake Street to the south, and Bloomington Avenue to the west. It is a part of Ward 9, currently represented by city council member Jason Chavez.

== History ==
On May 9, 2002, the Phillips neighborhood was subdivided into four smaller neighborhoods, with the southeastern quarter becoming the neighborhood of East Philips. The boundaries of East Philips are defined by Interstate 94 to the north, Hiawatha Avenue to the east, Lake Street to the south, and Interstate 35W to the west. These boundaries were officially designated on December 23, 2005.

Though not an officially designated neighborhood, East Phillips includes the Little Earth residential area, an association of 39 different Native American tribes centered around affordable housing areas that cater to Native American residents.

In 2023 and 2024, several vacant lots and parcels near the Midtown Greenway were set up host to homeless encampments organized by Camp Nenookaasi, a Minneapolis-based community organization. The camps were frequently dispersed by the Minneapolis city government, with residents property often being damaged in the process. Concordant with the surrounding demographics, most of the camps occupants were homeless Native American residents.

=== Roof depot ===
Though the neighborhood is primarily residential, there is a history of industrial and commercial activity in the area. In 2014, residents of the neighborhood formed the East Phillips Neighborhood Institute (EPNI) to address several pollutant concerns and the risks of proposed construction projects in the community. Throughout 2023, EPNI's activism was largely publicized for its involvement in Minneapolis' proposed Roof Depot project, centering on a large vacant warehouse near Highway 55 that was scheduled for demolition by the city of Minneapolis. Due to the past operation of a fertilizer plant in the area, the soil at the Roof Depot site is contaminated with arsenic, prompting the EPNI to oppose demolition or new construction on the grounds that this pollution would be dispersed from the soil to the surrounding neighborhood in the process.

These efforts culminated in the city agreeing to sell the property to the EPNI, provided they raise the required funds by September 2025. Further efforts by the EPNI also concentrated on two other industrial sites in the neighborhood; Smith Foundry Co., an iron working facility, and Bituminous Roadways, a producer of asphalt. Both of these sites have also been closed as of 2024 following EPA inquiries. In May 2026, the Minnesota House of Representatives approved $4 million to fund a new water distribution facility for Minneapolis, to offset the EPNI’s costs to buy the site. The northern half of the depot property will be used by the city and the southern half by the EPNI for farming and education classes.

== Demographics ==
As of 2020, the population of East Phillips was 4,904, split 51.8% male and 48.2% female. 60.1% of residents were at least a high school graduate (or equivalent), and 22.5% had earned a bachelor's degree or higher.

29.7% of the population were foreign-born residents, and 55.9% spoke a language other than English at home. 23.9% of residents spoke English less than "very well".

36.4% of households had no access to a vehicle. Among workers 16 years and older, 56.0% commuted to work via car, 18.0% used public transit, and 26.0% walked, biked, worked at home, or used some other method. The medium household income in East Phillips was $47,139. 30.1% of residents lived below the poverty line, and 6.7% were unemployed. 51.2% of housing in the neighborhood was renter-occupied.

Race/ethnicity
| Race/ethnicity | 2000 | | 2010 | | 2020 | |
| Race/ethnicity | Number | % | Number | % | Number | % |
|---|---|---|---|---|---|---|
| White alone | 618 | 14.90 | 709 | 16.61 | 754 | 15.36 |
| Black alone | 961 | 23.17 | 869 | 20.36 | 1,396 | 28.47 |
| Hispanic or Latino (any race) | 1,121 | 27.03 | 1,621 | 37.97 | 1,651 | 33.67 |
| Native American alone | 879 | 21.20 | 777 | 18.20 | 741 | 15.11 |
| Asian alone | 300 | 7.23 | 126 | 2.95 | 154 | 3.14 |
| Other race alone | 9 | 0.22 | 9 | 0.21 | 27 | 0.55 |
| Pacific Islander alone | 9 | 0.22 | 3 | 0.07 | 0 | 0.00 |
| Two or more races | 250 | 6.03 | 155 | 3.63 | 181 | 3.69 |
| Total | 4,147 | 100.0 | 4,269 | 100.0 | 4,904 | 100.0 |
