= Pál Frenák =

- Born: 4 May 1957 (age 68); Budapest, Hungary
- Known for: dancer, choreographer
- Website: www.frenak.hu

Pál Frenák (Budapest, May 4, 1957 - ) is a Hungarian dancer, director and choreographer. His aesthetic is influenced by sign language, architecture, cinema, Butoh, and by the work of French philosopher, Gilles Deleuze. His company was founded at the height of European Post-Dramatic Theater, and came to the fore during Hungary's transition from communism.

Frenák has received many awards, prizes, and grants, and his life has been the subject of many books, including Péter Márta's Frenak (2009).

== Studies ==
In the seventies he studied classical ballet, folk, and modern dance in Budapest, with Endre Jeszenszky whom he considered his master. In 1982, Frenák immigrated to Paris and studied ballet, Cunningham and Limon techniques, and contemporary dance with Gilber Mayer, Germaine Silva, Janine Charrat, Francois Dupuy, Karine Wener, J.C. Ramsayer, and Peter Goss.

== Career ==
In 1989 he established Compagnie Pál Frenák, working as a choreographer at the International Visuel Théatre (Theatre of the Deaf) and at the Théatre de Chatillon. In 1990, he returned to Hungary to teach contemporary dance, but he continued maintaining his work in France in developing a movement therapy program for physically challenged and autistic children at the Amiens University Hospital. He obtained his diploma from IFEDEM, Paris, for teaching classical ballet and contemporary dance. From 1993 to 1998 he toured in France, Romania, Russia, the Baltic States, and Israel. In 1998, after he received the Choreographer's Prize from Villa Kujoyama Artist's Retreat in Kyoto, he spent 6 months in Japan. In 1999, Compagnie Pal Frenak celebrated its 10th anniversary, and the company established two headquarters in both Paris and Budapest. Since 2000, Frenák has won numerous awards and prizes, such as the Order of Merit, Knights Cross from the Hungarian Cultural Minister or the prestigious Kossuth Prize in 2021.

== Creations ==
- Secret Souls (1991)
- Terre (1992)
- Les Palets (1994)
- Sainte Rita (1996)
- Sauvageries (1998)
- Out of the Cage (1999)
- Tricks & Tracks (1999)
- Ito and Szajuri (2000)
- MenNonNo (2000)
- Festen (2001)
- ChaOs (2002)
- Blue Spring (2003)
- The Hiden Men (2004)
- Credo Hysterica (2004)
- Trace I. (2005)
- Frisson - Apocalypse(2005)
- MILAN (2006)
- Tra-ce II. (2007)
- Instinct (2007)
- InTimE (2008)
- Twins (2009)
- Seven (2009)
- k.Rush (2010)
- Wings (2010)
- Hymen (2012)
- ChaOtica (2013)
- X&Y (2013)
- Tricks & Tracks 2. (2014)
- Birdie (2015)
- Rost & Frenák
- fa_UN (2016)
- Lutte (2016)
- The Wooden Prince (2017)
- HIR-O (2017)
- W_all (2018)
- Bolero (2019)
- CAGE (2019)
- Spid_er (2020)
- Fig_Ht (2021)
- Secret Off_Man (2022)

== Awards & Prizes ==
- Choreographer's Award of Villa Kujoyama Artist's Retreat, Kyoto (1998)
- Grand Prize of Veszprém Dance Festival (2000)
- Grand Prize of Soros Studio Theatre Days (2000)
- Harangozó Award for excellence in dance by the Hungarian Ministry of Cultural Heritage (2002)
- Phillip Morris Hungarian Ballet Prize (2005)
- Rudolf Lábán Prize for his Choreography entitled Fiúk/The Hidden Man (2006)
- Order of Merit, Knights Cross from the Hungarian Cultural Minister (2006)
- Imre Zoltán Foundation's Choreography Prize (2007)
- Rudolf Lábán Prize for his choreography entitled Instinct (2008)
- "For Budapest Award" for the excellence in dance and being the cultural ambassador of the city of Budapest worldwide (2014)
- Moholy-Nagy Award (2015)
- Sándor Hevesi Award (2016)
- "Érdemes Művész" State Award for Excellence in Art (2018)
- Jeszenszky Award for Pedagogy (2018)
- Kossuth Prize (2021)

== More Information ==
- Official Website
- Official Archive
- Compagnie Pal Frenak - Facebook Page
- Compagnie Pal Frenak - Youtube Channel
- Compagnie Pal Frenak - Instagram profile
