= Miklós Szabó =

Miklós Szabó is a male Hungarian name that may refer to:

- Miklós Szabó (judoka) (born 1955), Australian judoka
- Miklós Szabó (middle-distance runner) (1908–2000), Hungarian middle-distance runner
- Miklós Szabó (long-distance runner) (1928–2022), Hungarian long-distance runner
- Miklós Szabó (sport shooter) (born 1938), Hungarian sports shooter
