= László Szabó (fencer) =

Hungarian fencer

László Szabó (born 1905 in Târgu Mureș, date of death unknown) was a Hungarian fencing master. He got known for his book Fencing and The Master, which is until this day important literature for fencing coaches. Szabó wrote it after accumulating broad knowledge during his lifetime such as from his maestro Italo Santelli.

== Fencing and The Master ==
In his book Fencing and The Master he describes correct fencing positions and the important details for the coach. In particular, he mentions the importance of loose muscles for quick flexibility and reaction.
