= Zoltán Szabó (serial killer) =

Hungarian serial killer

- Born: 1968; Hungarian People's Republic
- Died: December 5, 2016 (aged 47–48); Szeged, Hungary
- Cause of death: Suicide by hanging
- Other name: "The Balástya Monster"
- Conviction: Murder
- Penalty: Life imprisonment

Details
- Victims: 4–6+11
- Span of crimes: 1998–2001
- Country: Hungary
- State: Csongrád County
- Date apprehended: March 6, 2002

Zoltán Szabó (1968 – December 5, 2016), known as The Balástya Monster, was a Hungarian serial killer who killed women for monetary purposes. He was convicted of killing four people out of his 5 confirmed murders, but could possibly have upwards of 6 victims.

== Early life ==
Szabó was born into a farmer's family in 1968, and had lived on a farm since his youth. He studied until the eighth grade in elementary school, refusing to study any more. His father died early, and his brother who lived on the farm died by suicide. Szabó already had a criminal record at the time of the murders, as he was convicted for the rape of a 60-year-old woman. He also behaved violently towards his partner, who broke off the relationship with him because of this. He then began living alone on his farm doing occasional farm work. In addition to this, he also participated in organizing seasonal workers from Romania during the agricultural season, finding work and accommodations for them. During the second half of the 1990s, the traffic near Balástya grew, as the civil war in Yugoslavia had recently ended and many passed through the 5th Highway along the settlement. The increasing turnover of the highway attracted businesses, criminals, merchants and prostitutes to the settlement, including some of Szabó's future victims.

== Confirmed murders ==
Szabó's first proven murder was of a woman working in a bar, with whom he met on April 28, 1998. He managed to persuade her to stay on his farm on the outskirts of Balástya. Upon their arrival, the woman was hit with a heavy object several times, dying from the severe head injuries. Szabó then dismembered his victim and buried her body in a pit 50 meters away from the farm, in which he also placed her clothes. The second murder took place in a similar fashion. Szabó met another woman whom he persuaded to come to his farm. When she came, he hit her with heavy object on the head and neck, with the woman dying from the heavy blows. The body was then dismembered and placed in the same pit as before, the only difference being that the second victim's head was never discovered.

In February 2000, on the pretext of joint theft of fire syringes, Szabó lured and killed Teresia K. The woman was strangled in an orchard, and was then mutilated and burned. Her clothes were never found either.

The fourth proven murder led to Szabó's downfall. In August 2001, he convinced a female dealer, who used to sell cell phones, that she would get a large amount of phones at a favorable price. The woman believed him, and on August 25 she collected 300,000 forints from the bank. The woman then drove to Szabó's farm, where she was strangled by him. The murderer then disposed of the evidence and the woman's small motorbike in a nearby water hole. However, the authorities were closely monitoring the disappearances, and when the phone dealer disappeared, they searched through her call lists, where they found Zoltán Szabó's number. When questioned, he confessed to the murder. Later on, when more corpses were discovered, he confessed to these murders as well.

== Unconfirmed murders ==
On August 25, 1998, Szabó supposedly forced prostitute Mónika K. to leave the 5th Highway car park and go to his farm. There, he strangled her in a nearby orchard and dragged the body to a track near the Cegléd-Szeged railway line. Subsequently, a freight train and two other trains ran over the body, completely crushing it. Although Szabó was last seen in her company, the court could not definitely prove that he was the culprit, and he was not convicted of Mónika K.'s murder.

Szabó also mentioned a sixth murder, which he claimed to have not committed but simply knew of. The investigators doubted his claim of innocence, but the post-mortem investigation proved ineffective, and so this case was included in the indictment.

The police investigator who led the investigation also stated that he was certain Szabó was responsible for more murders. The detective, referring to a witness' testimony, wrote that Szabó was responsible for the disappearances of a Romanian family of five. He was so confident of his opinion that he offered 500,000 forints to Szabó for each new corpse he showed the location to.

== Investigation, trial and prison ==
After Szabó's capture, extensive research began for the killer's victims. Following his testimony, the surrounding area was searched, and in the specified places, excavations of an unprecedented scale, almost of landscaping, began. During the search, four corpses from Szabó's testimonies were located, but no remnants of other murders were found. Despite this, the prosecution suspected him of murdering five women.

The Csongrád County court, hearing the case at first instance, found Zoltán Szabó guilty of all four murders and sentenced him to life imprisonment in November 2003. On September 10, 2004, the Szeged Court Judge sentenced to life imprisonment for a final time. The Trial Chamber could not find any evidence that Szabó's murders involved sexual aberration, and there was no mention of this other despicable reason in the judgment.

The farm where Szabó's offenses were committed still stands as of 2015. The offender was detained in the secluded area of the Star Prison in Szeged. On December 5, 2016, the suicidal Szabó and his cellmate hanged themselves.

== See also ==
- List of serial killers by country
