= Sándor Szabó =

Sándor Szabó, anglicized as Sandor Szabo, may refer to:

- Sándor Szabó (wrestler) (1906–1966), Hungarian-born American wrestler
- Sándor Szabó (actor) (1915–1997), Hungarian actor
- Sándor Szabó (fencer) (1941–1992), Hungarian Olympic fencer
- Sándor Szabó (pentathlete), Hungarian pentathlete
- Sándor Szabó (musician) (born 1960), Hungarian concert pianist and music director
- Sándor Szabó (swimmer) (1951–2021), Hungarian Olympic swimmer
- Sándor Andó-Szabó, Hungarian football referee
