= Károly Ferenc Szabó =

Romanian politician (1943–2011)

Károly Ferenc Szabó (August 29, 1943 – January 25, 2011) was a Hungarian-Romanian politician and Member of the European Parliament. He was a member of the Democratic Union of Hungarians in Romania (UDMR), and served as Senator for Satu Mare County from 1990 to 2008. Szabó became an MEP as part of the European People's Party–European Democrats, on January 1, 2007, with Romania's accession to the European Union.

He was born in Désakna, Kolozs County, Kingdom of Hungary (today part of Dej in Cluj County, Romania), two years later, after the Second World War II he became a Romanian citizen. He graduated from the Cluj Polytechnic Institute. First elected to the Senate during the 1990 suffrage, which followed the Romanian Revolution, he was reelected in 1992, 1996, 2000 and 2004, serving as head of the UDMR group in Parliament. During his mandates, he has served on the Defense, Public Order and National Safety Board, as well as on the Culture, Arts and Mass-Media Board.
