= Jason Chavez =

American politician

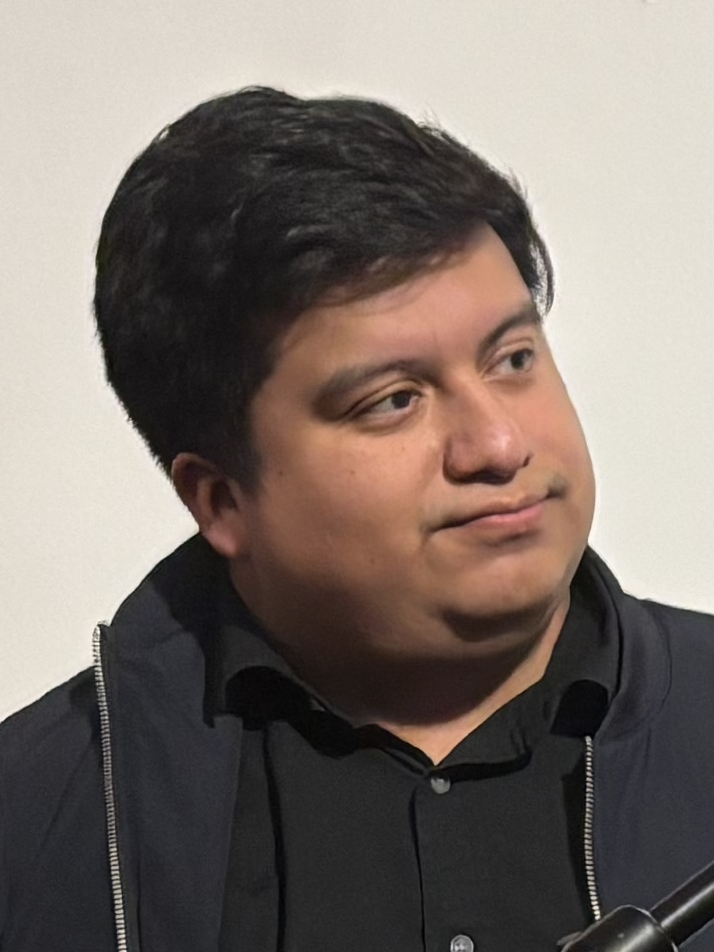
- Chavez in 2023

Member of the Minneapolis City Council from the 9th Ward
- Incumbent
- Assumed office January 3, 2022
- Preceded by: Alondra Cano

Personal details
- Born: 1994 or 1995 (age 30–31) Minneapolis, Minnesota
- Party: Democratic
- Other political affiliations: Minnesota Democratic Socialists of America (Note: Democratic Socialists of America is not a registered political party, instead, it is a political organization for those with democratic socialist ideologies.)
- Website: Official website

Jason Chavez (born 1994/1995) is an American politician who has served on the Minneapolis City Council, representing the 9th ward, since 2022. He is a member of Minnesota's Democratic–Farmer–Labor Party.

== Early life ==
Chavez was born in Minneapolis to Mexican immigrants. He turned to crime at age 13 after his parents lost their home in the 2008 financial crisis, but later enrolled in high school, graduating in 2014.

Chavez graduated from College of Saint Scholastica with a Bachelor’s degree in 2018.

== Career ==
After graduating, Chavez served as a Committee Legislative Aide to state representatives Carlos Mariani and Mohamud Noor. He worked on both the Public Safety and Criminal Justice Reform Committee and the Workforce and Business Development Committee at the Minnesota House of Representatives.

=== Minneapolis City Council ===
Chavez was first elected to the Minneapolis City Council in 2021, succeeding Alondra Cano. He was re-elected in the 2023 election, receiving 78.94% of the vote in the first round of tabulation. As of 2025, Chavez serves as the Vice-Chair of the Committee of the Whole, as well as the Race and Equity Committee.

== Personal life ==
Chavez lives in the East Phillips neighborhood in south Minneapolis. He has described himself as “the only out LGBTQ+ person” on the Minneapolis City Council.
