= Zsuzsanna Szabó (footballer) =

Hungarian footballer

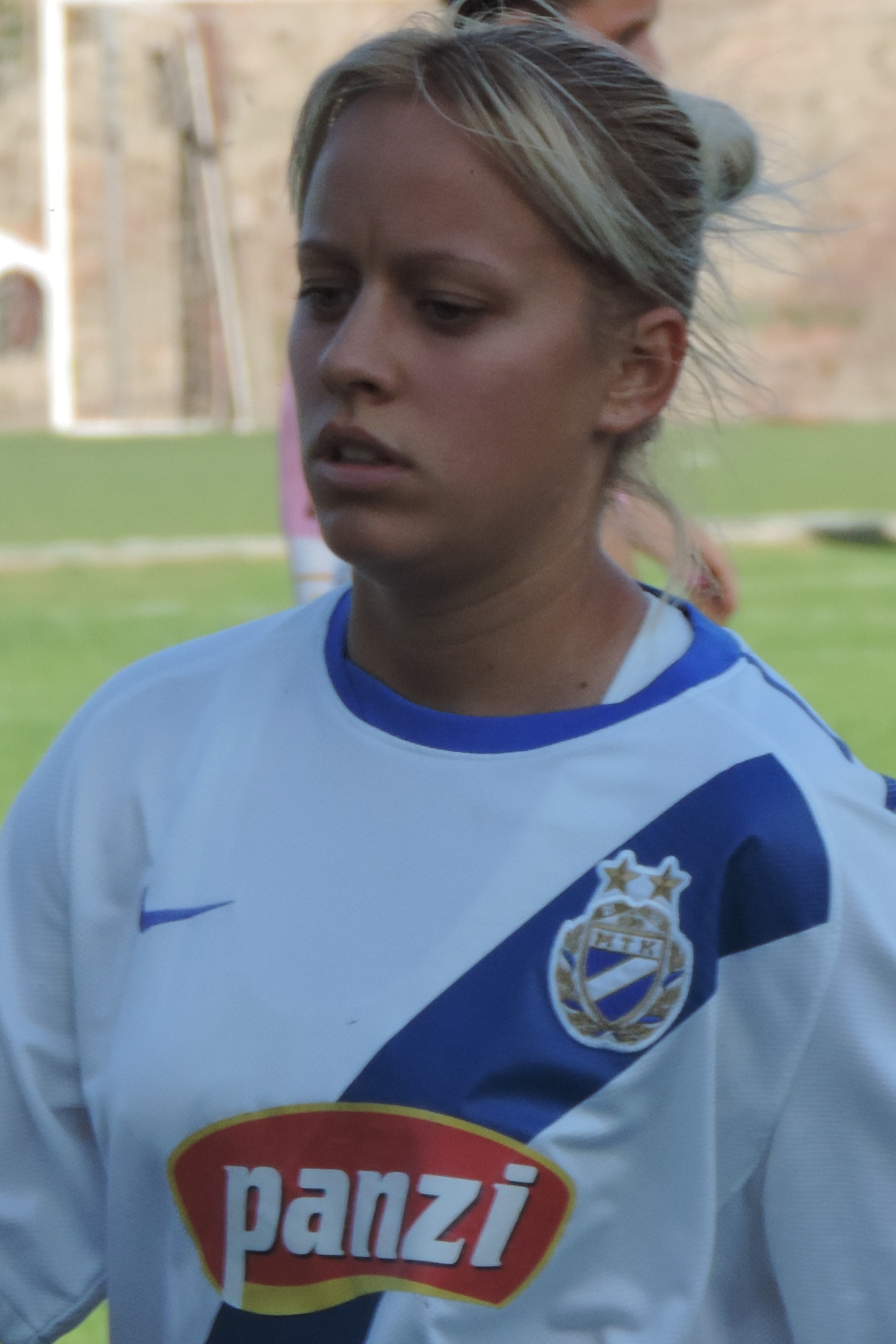

Personal information
- Full name: Zsuzsanna Szabó
- Date of birth: 3 April 1991 (age 35)
- Place of birth: ?, Hungary
- Position: Midfielder

Senior career*
Years	Team	Apps	(Gls)
2006–	MTK		

International career^{‡}
2013–	Hungary	3	(0)
- * Club domestic league appearances and goals ‡ National team caps and goals as of 2 June 2013

Zsuzsanna Szabó (born 3 April 1991) is a Hungarian football midfielder currently playing in the Hungarian First Division for MTK Hungária, with whom she has also played the Champions League.
