= Little Earth =

Residential area in Minneapolis, Minnesota, US

- Residential Community
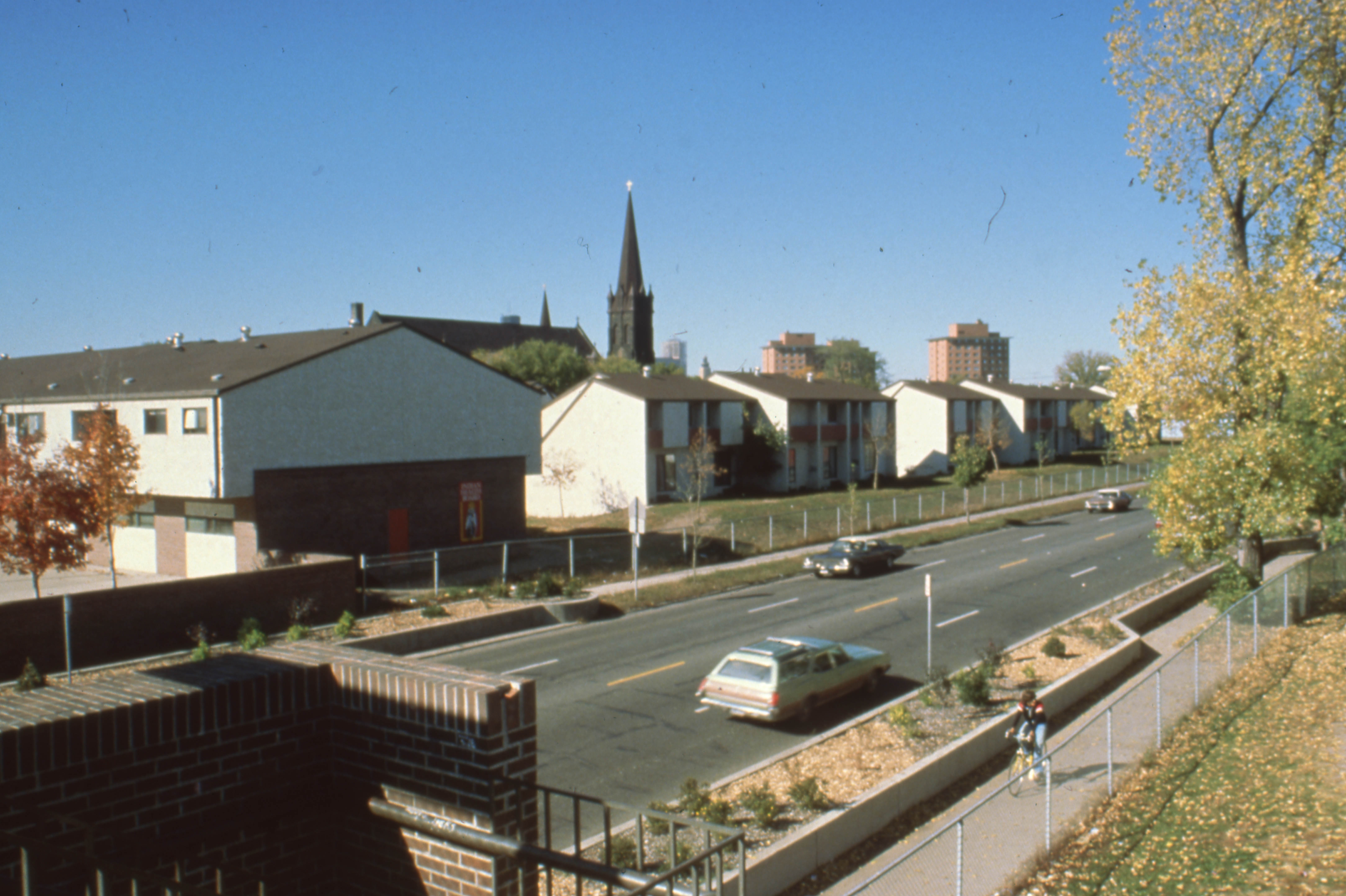
- Little Earth community in Minneapolis, 1980
- Country: United States
- State: Minnesota
- County: Hennepin
- City: Minneapolis
- Founded: 1973

Area
  - Total: 2.3 sq mi (6.0 km^{2})

Population (2010)
  - Total: 1,500
  - Density: 650/sq mi (250/km^{2})
- Time zone: UTC-6 (CST)
  - Summer (DST): UTC-5 (CDT)
- ZIP code: 55404
- Area code: 612
- Website: https://www.littleearth.org/

Little Earth is a residential housing area in Minneapolis, Minnesota, United States, that is home to nearly 1,000 people, many of whom are Native American. The residential housing association at Little Earth considers itself a united people of 39 different Native American tribes, but the area is not an urban reservation, a common mischaracterization. Little Earth is located in the Phillips community of Minneapolis. While being a notable district, it is not one of the officially designated neighborhoods in the city.

== Demographics ==
In the 2010s, the population of Little Earth fluctuated between 1,200 and 1,500 people, with children comprising half the total. Almost all of the households had a reported income of less than $10,000 per year. Little Earth has been described as being at the heart of Minneapolis' Native American community. Native American people represent 7 percent of the broader Phillips area in the southern part of Minneapolis, which is also the city's poorest area with 48 percent of people living in poverty.

== History ==
Little Earth was founded in 1973 as an affordable housing project in Minneapolis. The residential community was built out in the 1970s, becoming a 9.4-acre (3.8 ha), 212-unit housing complex at approximately East 24th Street and Cedar Avenue in the South Minneapolis area. Beginning soon after its founding, Little Earth and the surrounding community have been at the center of the American Indian Movement.

As of the 2010s, the Little Earth housing complex was the only Native American–preference, project-based Section 8 rental assistance community in the United States. The community's residential association, Little Earth of United Tribes, has filled a need for social services to residents by offering empowerment counselors, bike rentals, family therapy, tutoring, and homeownership opportunities.

During the George Floyd protests in Minneapolis–Saint Paul in May and June 2020, community members organized safety patrol during the nights of heavy rioting, arson, and looting. Located less than one mile (1.6 km) from Lake Street, residents set up barricades to keep protesters from marching through the neighborhood, fearing it would result in property destruction and law enforcement actions. The effort was credited with saving more than 20 businesses on Franklin Avenue. Residents also organized nightly safety patrols, paid for lights at a park, and trained community members in de-escalation tactics, efforts some hoped would serve as a new model for policing in the city.

== Geography ==
The Little Earth community is located within the Phillips area of Minneapolis. On the eastern edge of the community along the Hiawatha transit corridor, the Little Earth Trail, a multi-use pedestrian and bicycle path, connects people to business and services from Franklin Avenue to East Lake Street. Several Native American organizations are in the broader Little Earth area, such as Minneapolis American Indian Center, the Native American Community Clinic, the Native American Community Development Institute, and the Minnesota Indian Women’s Resource Center.

== See also ==
- Indian Relocation Act of 1956
- Urban Indian
