= Jamal Osman (politician) =

American politician

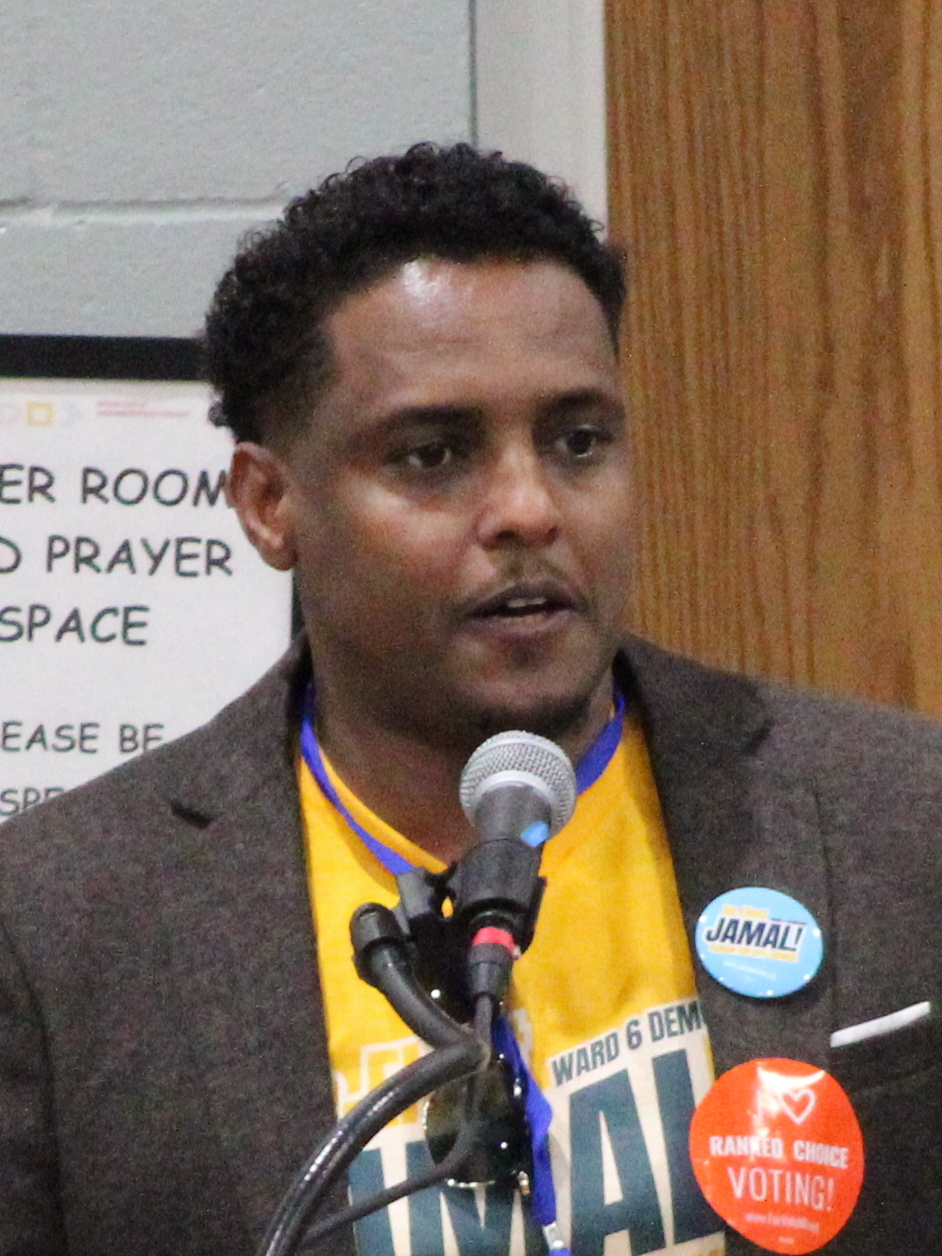
- Osman in 2025

Vice President of the Minneapolis City Council
- Incumbent
- Assumed office January 6, 2026
- President: Elliott Payne
- Preceded by: Aisha Chughtai

Member of the Minneapolis City Council from the 6th ward
- Incumbent
- Assumed office August 28, 2020
- Preceded by: Abdi Warsame

Personal details
- Born: 1983 or 1984 (age 41–42) Somalia
- Party: Democratic
- Children: 5
- Website: Official website

Jamal Osman is an American politician. A member of Minnesota's Democratic–Farmer–Labor Party, has served in the Minneapolis City Council since his 2020 election, representing the 6th ward. Since 2026, he has been the council's vice president. Ward 6 includes Cedar-Riverside, Elliot Park, Stevens Square, much of Phillips, and parts of Seward.

== Early life ==
Osman was born in Somalia and was a refugee in Kenya before coming to the United States when he was 14. After arriving in Minnesota, he lived in public housing.

== Career ==
Prior to his political career, Osman worked as a Resident Advocate for CommonBond Communities, a nonprofit affordable housing organization, where he assisted tenants and helped connect them with social services. He also worked as a community organizer, focusing on issues such as housing, education, and social services within Minneapolis's East African community.

=== Minneapolis City Council ===
Osman was first elected to the Minneapolis City Council in a special election on August 11, 2020, succeeding Abdi Warsame. He was re-elected in 2021 and again in 2023. In the 2023 election, he won with 48.3% of the vote after the second round of ranked-choice voting tabulation.In the 2025 election, Osman won re-election against challenger Mohamoud Hassan (DFL), winning 58.7% of the vote in the first round.

In their first meeting in January 2026, the council elected Osman as vice president. He currently chairs the Business, Housing and Zoning committee.

== Personal life ==
Osman is Somali-American and was born in Somalia. He fled the civil war there as a child and grew up in refugee camps in Kenya before immigrating to the United States as a refugee. He and his family live in the Phillips West neighborhood with their children. As a teenager, he lived in public housing after arriving in Minnesota, an experience that he states inspired him to pursue a career in community service and helping others.

Osman is married to Ilo Amba, the founder of the nonprofit organization Urban Advantage Services (UAS). They have five children. According to Osman, the family has resided in the Cedar Riverside neighborhood, but questions arose about his having had a Maplewood residential address during his 2020 campaign.

In 2022, Osman apologized for making antisemitic and anti-gay comments that he made on Facebook between 2011 and 2013. His apology stated that the posts did not reflect his current beliefs and values.

=== Feeding Our Future connection ===
On February 17, 2025, federal prosecutors presented evidence connecting Osman's former nonprofit, Stigma-Free International, to the large-scale fraud case centering Feeding Our Future. Prosecutors alleged that Osman, his wife Ilo Amba, and two others, founded the nonprofit as a shell company before transferring it to others who were able to commit fraud under the nonprofit's name. Amba operated a Feeding Our Future food site, which received more than $450,000 in reimbursements from the program. Neither Osman nor Amba has been charged with any crime.

About a month after turning Stigma-Free over to new directors, Amba incorporated another nonprofit, Urban Advantage Center. Urban Advantage Center was shut down for civil violations in a settlement with state attorney general Keith Ellison, who alleged that Amba created a “sham” charity to enrich herself.

== Electoral history ==
=== Results ===
2025 Minneapolis City Council election, ward 6
Party	Candidate	Round 1	
Party	Candidate	Votes	%
Democratic (DFL)	Jamal Osman (incumbent)	4,164	58.78%
Democratic (DFL)	Mohamoud Hassan	2,837	40.05%
Write-in	Write-ins	83	1.17%
Total active votes		7,084	100.0%

2023 Minneapolis City Council election, ward 6
Party	Candidate	Round 1		Round 2		
Party	Candidate	Votes	%	Transfer	Votes	%
Democratic (DFL)	Jamal Osman (incumbent)	2,317	44.73%	+183	2,500	58.18%
Democratic (DFL)	Kayseh Magan	1,553	29.98%	+244	1,797	41.81%
Democratic (DFL)	Tiger Worku	1,127	21.76%	-1,120	Eliminated	
Republican	Guy Gaskin	174	3.36%	-174	Eliminated	
Write-in	Write-ins	9	0.17%	-9	Eliminated	
Total active votes		5,180	100.00%	-883	4,297	82.95%

2021 Minneapolis City Council election, ward 6
Party	Candidate	% 1st Choice	Round 1
Minnesota Democratic–Farmer–Labor Party	Jamal Osman (incumbent)	59.41%	3,722
Minnesota Democratic–Farmer–Labor Party	Abdirizak Bihi	39.39%	2,468
Write-in	N/A	1.20%	75
Total votes			6,871
Threshold			3,436
Turnout		43.5%	6,871
Source: Minneapolis Elections & Voter Services

Minneapolis City Council Ward 6 special election, 2020
Political party/principle	Candidate	Round 1	% 1st Choice	Final round (Round 4)	Final round %
DFL	Jamal Osman	2,131	27.51	2,795	55.01%
DFL	AJ Awed	1,722	22.23	2,286	44.99%
DFL	AK Hassan	1,066	13.76	Eliminated	
DFL	Abdirizak Bihi	1,002	12.94	Eliminated	
DFL	Michael P. Dougherty	391	5.05	Eliminated	
DFL	Alex Palacios	384	4.96	Eliminated	
DFL	Saciido Shaie	333	4.30	Eliminated	
Exhausted				2,665	34.40
Total active ballots		7,746	100.0%	5,081	65.60%
