= Beltrami, Minneapolis =

Beltrami
- Neighborhood
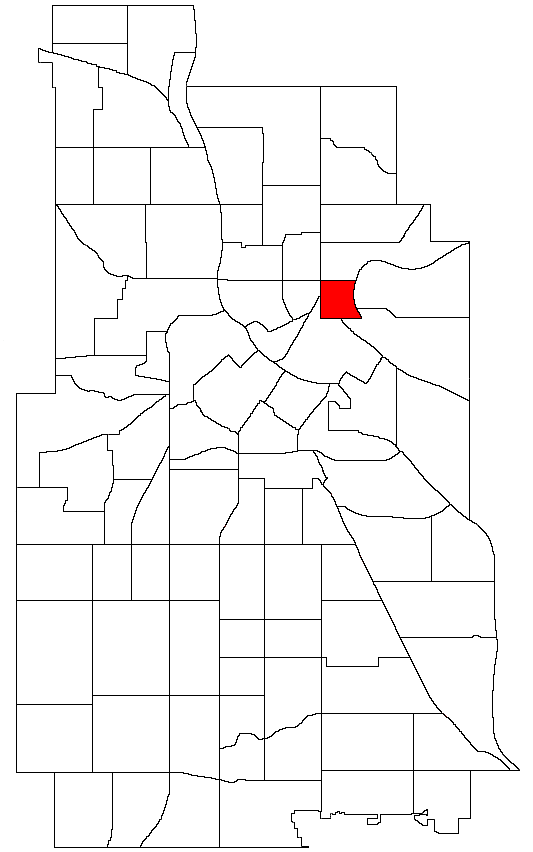
- Location of Beltrami within the U.S. city of Minneapolis
- Interactive map of Beltrami
- Country: United States
- State: Minnesota
- County: Hennepin
- City: Minneapolis
- Community: Northeast
- City Council Ward: 3

Government
  - Council Member: Michael Rainville

Area
  - Total: 0.267 sq mi (0.69 km^{2})

Population (2020)
  - Total: 1,226
  - Density: 4,590/sq mi (1,770/km^{2})
- Time zone: UTC-6 (CST)
  - Summer (DST): UTC-5 (CDT)
- ZIP code: 55413, 55414
- Area code: 612

Historical population
Census	Pop.	Note	%±
1980	996		—
1990	1,202		20.7%
2000	1,277		6.2%
2010	1,248		−2.3%
2020	1,226		−1.8%

Beltrami is a neighborhood in the Northeast community in Minneapolis. Its boundaries are Broadway Street NE to the north, Interstate 35W to the east, East Hennepin Avenue to the south, and Central Avenue and Harrison Street NE to the west. The Beltrami neighborhood and park is named after Giacomo Constantino Beltrami, an early 19th-century Italian jurist, scholar and explorer.

Beltrami covers an area of 0.267 square miles, and has a population of approximately 1,312. Beltrami is located in City Council Ward 3, currently represented by council member Michael Rainville.

In 2023, the Beltrami and Northeast Park neighborhood associations voted to merge into the new Lower Northeast Neighborhoods Association. The two associations sought the merger to combine resources. Financial assistance from the city of Minneapolis had been declining. The nearby neighborhood associations of Logan Park and St. Anthony East declined to join the merged organization.

== Demographics ==
Beltrami's ethnic makeup has changed since 1980. Every ethnic group except whites saw an increase in population between 1980 and 2000. White residents, who made up 92 percent of the neighborhood population in 1980, made up 61 percent in 2000. While there were 141 fewer white residents in 2000 than in 1980, there were 143 more black residents. The black population increased from a fraction of a percent in 1980 to 11 percent in 2000. The percentages for Hispanic and Asian populations also grew during this time, from 2 percent and 1 percent respectively to 10 percent each. In 1999, 24 percent of Beltrami residents lived below the poverty level, compared to 17 percent of Minneapolis residents.

Race/ethnicity
Race/ethnicity	2000		2010		2020	
Race/ethnicity	Number	%	Number	%	Number	%
White alone	775	60.69	614	48.08	759	61.76
Black alone	146	11.43	232	18.17	154	12.53
Hispanic or Latino (any race)	126	9.87	230	18.01	178	14.48
Native American alone	57	4.46	37	2.90	15	1.22
Asian alone	124	9.71	72	5.64	43	3.50
Other race alone	0	0.00	0	0.00	5	0.41
Pacific Islander alone	0	0.00	0	0.00	0	0.00
Two or more races	49	3.84	63	4.93	75	6.10
Total	1,277	100.0	1,248	100.0	1,229	100.0
