= Northeast Park, Minneapolis =

Coordinates: 45.0031°N 93.2413°W

Northeast Park
- Neighborhood
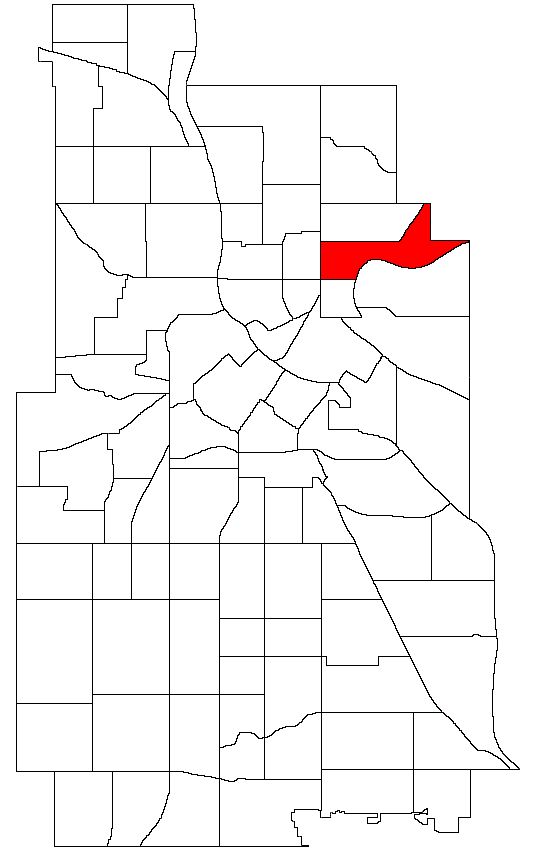
- Location of Northeast Park within the U.S. city of Minneapolis
- Interactive map of Northeast Park
- Country: United States
- State: Minnesota
- County: Hennepin
- City: Minneapolis
- Community: Northeast
- City Council Ward: 1

Government
  - Council Member: Elliott Payne

Area
  - Total: 0.704 sq mi (1.82 km^{2})

Population (2020)
  - Total: 797
  - Density: 1,130/sq mi (437/km^{2})
- Time zone: UTC-6 (CST)
  - Summer (DST): UTC-5 (CDT)
- ZIP code: 55413, 55418
- Area code: 612

Historical population
| Census | Pop. | Note | %± |
|---|---|---|---|
| 1980 | 761 | | — |
| 1990 | 722 | | −5.1% |
| 2000 | 882 | | 22.2% |
| 2010 | 672 | | −23.8% |
| 2020 | 797 | | 18.6% |

Northeast Park is a neighborhood in the Northeast community in Minneapolis, Minnesota. Its boundaries are 18th Avenue NE and New Brighton Boulevard to the north, the city limits to the northeast, Interstate 35W to the southeast, Broadway Street NE to the south, and Central Avenue to the west. It is one of ten neighborhoods in Ward 1 of Minneapolis, currently represented by Council President Elliott Payne.

The Quarry shopping center is located in this neighborhood. Northeast Athletic Field Park resides in the neighborhood with various baseball fields, soccer fields and playgrounds. In 2018, A new Recreation center was built in the Northeast Athletic Field Park.

In 2023, the Northeast Park and Beltrami neighborhood associations voted to merge into the new Lower Northeast Neighborhoods Association. The two associations sought the merger to combine resources. Financial assistance from the city of Minneapolis had been declining. The nearby neighborhood associations of Logan Park and St. Anthony East declined to join the merged organization.

== Demographics ==
Race/ethnicity
| Race/ethnicity | 2000 | | 2010 | | 2020 | |
| Race/ethnicity | Number | % | Number | % | Number | % |
|---|---|---|---|---|---|---|
| White alone | 633 | 71.77 | 446 | 66.37 | 500 | 62.97 |
| Black alone | 90 | 10.20 | 61 | 9.08 | 80 | 10.08 |
| Hispanic or Latino (any race) | 92 | 10.43 | 86 | 12.80 | 103 | 12.97 |
| Native American alone | 17 | 1.93 | 20 | 2.98 | 20 | 2.52 |
| Asian alone | 30 | 3.40 | 29 | 4.32 | 17 | 2.14 |
| Other race alone | 0 | 0.00 | 1 | 0.15 | 4 | 0.50 |
| Pacific Islander alone | 0 | 0.00 | 0 | 0.00 | 0 | 0.00 |
| Two or more races | 20 | 2.27 | 29 | 4.32 | 70 | 8.82 |
| Total | 882 | 100.0 | 672 | 100.0 | 794 | 100.0 |
