= Waite Park, Minneapolis =

Coordinates: 45.0311°N 93.2339°W

Waite Park
- Neighborhood
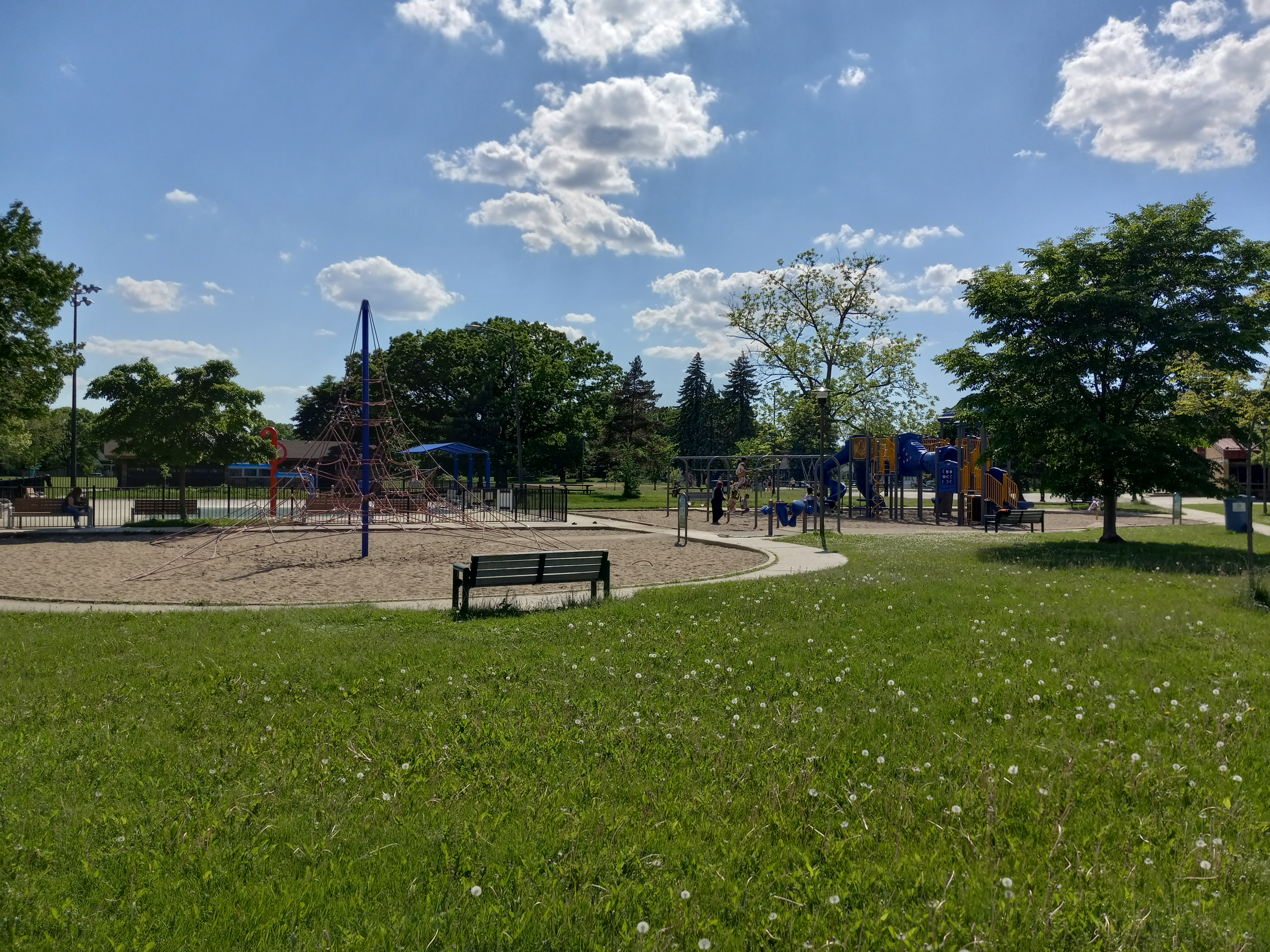
- Waite Park, the namesake of the Minneapolis neighborhood

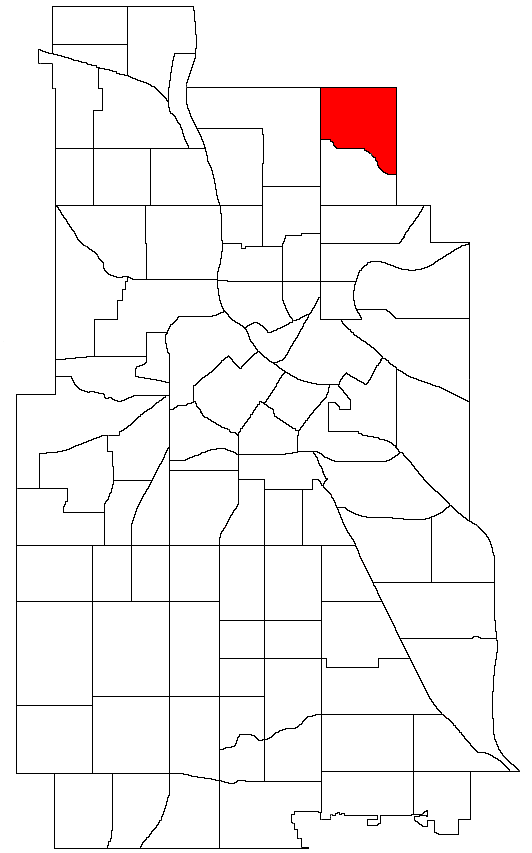
- Location of Waite Park within the U.S. city of Minneapolis
- Interactive map of Waite Park
- Country: United States
- State: Minnesota
- County: Hennepin
- City: Minneapolis
- Community: Northeast
- City Council Ward: 1

Government
  - Council Member: Elliott Payne

Area
  - Total: 0.88 sq mi (2.3 km^{2})

Population (2020)
  - Total: 5,550
  - Density: 6,300/sq mi (2,400/km^{2})
- Time zone: UTC-6 (CST)
  - Summer (DST): UTC-5 (CDT)
- ZIP code: 55418, 55421
- Area code: 612

Historical population
Census	Pop.	Note	%±
1980	6,192		—
1990	5,707		−7.8%
2000	5,205		−8.8%
2010	5,244		0.7%
2020	5,550		5.8%

Waite Park is a neighborhood in the Northeast community in Minneapolis, Minnesota. Its boundaries are 37th Avenue NE to the north, NE Stinson Boulevard to the East, Saint Anthony Parkway to the south, and NE Central Avenue to the west. It is the furthest northeast neighborhood within Minneapolis. It is one of ten neighborhoods in Ward 1 of Minneapolis, currently represented by Council President Elliott Payne, and falls under the jurisdiction of the second precinct of the Minneapolis Police Department.

== History ==
Waite Park was among the last areas of northeast Minneapolis to be developed into urban neighborhoods in the last part of the nineteenth century. The area was mostly farmland until the 1880s and 1890s. The completion of Saint Anthony Parkway through the neighborhood in 1924 increased the pace of development. Although many of the homes in the neighborhood were built in the decades between the completion of the parkway and World War II, the neighborhood was not fully developed until the postwar housing boom.

The neighborhood is named after Edward Foote Waite, a former judge in Hennepin County.

Waite Park Neighborhood and Columbia Park Neighborhood were the last areas of East Minneapolis to be developed. The land between 27th Avenue and 37th Avenue was incorporated into the city by 1887. Most farmers in the area sold their land to developers soon afterwards. Their former fields were platted into house lots and streets. By 1892 one-third of the land in Waite Park had been platted. Some farmers continued to hold against the advancing city, the last being the Ritchels who remained until the 1940s.

The Minneapolis St Paul and Sault Ste Marie Railway, which still runs through the neighborhood, was also completed in 1887. The railroad built a large repair facility on the shores of Lake Sandy. The lake disappeared in the early twentieth century, but the Shoreham Yards facility remains. New Boston, centered at Lowry and Central was a thriving commercial center at this time.

Despite railroad access and proximity to a commercial center, Waite Park grew slowly in these years. 30 years after incorporation, two-thirds of the land had been platted for houses, but only 160 built. Although the total population of Minneapolis 80 years ago was almost the same as it is today Waite Park had less than 7% of the 2400 homes in the neighborhood today. Central Avenue was the focus of the area; two-thirds of the houses in Waite Park in 1914 were within 3 blocks.

In May 1915, the St. Anthony Commercial Club proposed to build a parkway across Northeast Minneapolis. This would help to complete the Grand Rounds Scenic Byway, a belt of parks and parkways encircling the city, first envisioned in the 1880s. They also hoped it would stimulate economic development in the area. This idea received a boost when the Armour company donated a mile-and-a-half-long strip of land in St. Anthony township, and offered to pay the costs of constructing a parkway along that route. Armour had purchased the land for a meatpacking plant, later they decided South Saint Paul would be a better location.

The original plan for extending the Grand Rounds was to extend Stinson Boulevard into what is now Columbia Heights, and follow the Reservoir Boulevard back to Columbia Park (which had been purchased in 1892). Now the plan was to build St. Anthony Boulevard along a meandering path across Northeast Minneapolis. The new parkway was named 'St. Anthony' because it ran through St. Anthony Township for much of its length. Land was also donated to extend the parkway to East Hennepin Avenue, along what is now Industrial Boulevard. In the 1930s this southern extension of the parkway would be swapped for Ridgeway Road to provide room for a gravel pit. The stretch between the end of Ridgeway Road and the Mississippi river trails that start at the University of Minnesota East Bank remain the only gap in the Grand Rounds.

To build St Anthony Parkway the city had to purchase the land between Stinson and Columbia Park, which was mostly empty lots. However, as the Secretary of the Park Board admitted at the time "No time has been set for beginning the actual work of constructing the boulevard nor is any money for the work now available." The outbreak of World War I further delayed construction, which isn't completed until 1924. The total cost of the boulevard was estimated at $910,000 in 1923. This money came from a variety of sources. Armour's donation of land and materials was valued at $160,000. $300,000 was raised in bonds, and $150,000 from general city funds. The remaining $300,000 was assessed against property in East Minneapolis, which worked out to about $15 per lot.

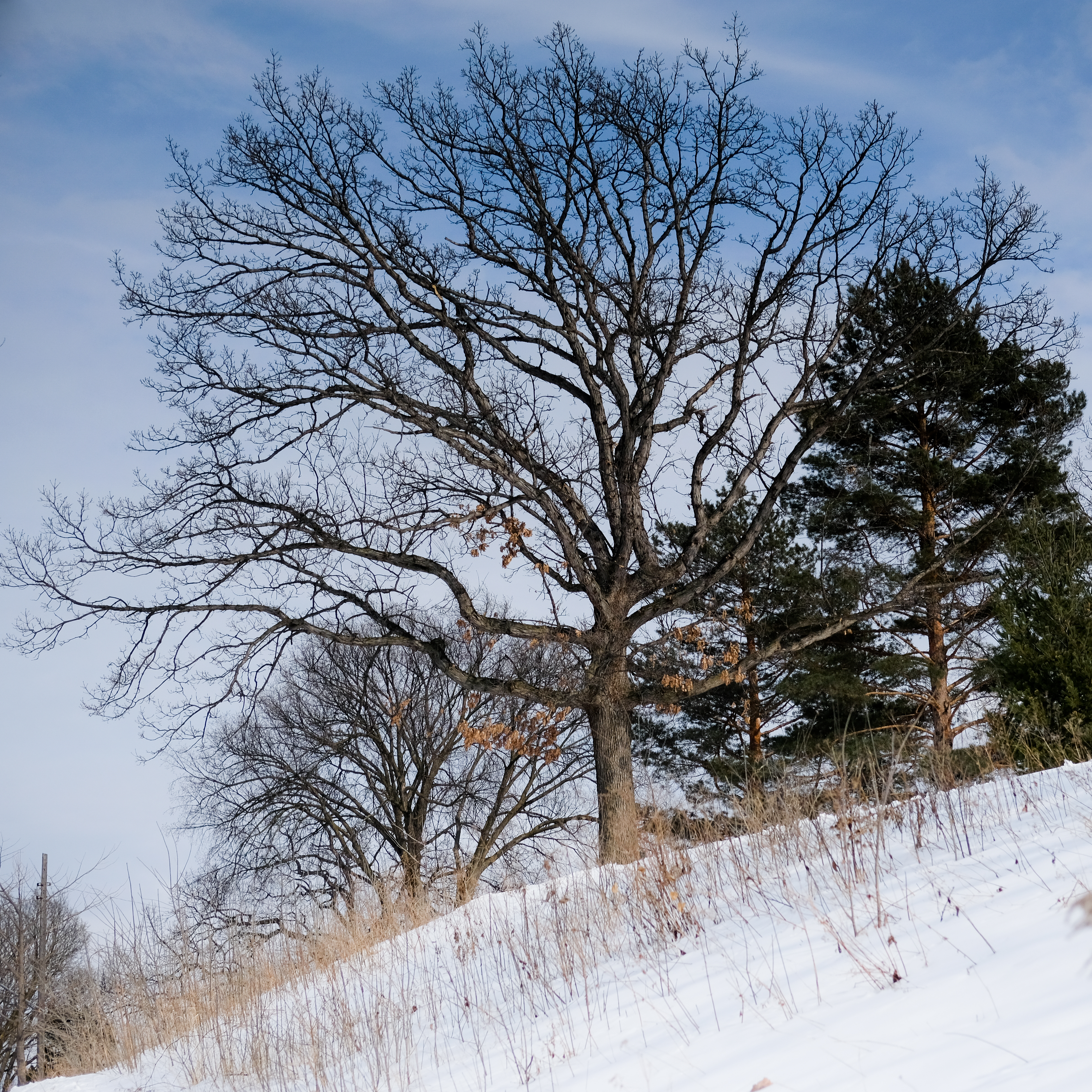
Deming Heights Park

In November 1923 Armour offered to build a golf course on their land east of the parkway, and sell it to the city for $200,000. Greens fees would pay for the acquisition so it was a good deal for the city. In 1924 another $50,000 in bonds was issued to complete St. Anthony Boulevard and Grandview Park (renamed to Deming Heights Park in the 1930s). In September 1924 early settlers of the area celebrated the grand opening of the Boulevard with a parade, and speeches. Businesses in the area were closed for half a day so everyone could attend the festivities. Also in 1924 the Johnson Streetcar line was extended from 29th to 33rd, which improved access and spurred house construction in Waite Park. In October 1924 Alderman Gisele was quoted in the local paper, "The corner of 33rd and Ulysses is in a section which is coming to the front as a very desirable locality for modern homes. It is not very far from the beautiful new St. Anthony Boulevard."

By 1940 three-quarters of all houses in Waite Park were within three blocks of St. Anthony Boulevard. The number of houses had increased fourfold in 25 years, but there were still only a quarter of the present number of houses. It would take the post-WWII housing boom to completely fill out the neighborhood. Contrast this with the Audubon Park Neighborhood, just south of St. Anthony Boulevard, where three-quarters of existing houses were built before 1939.

== Demographics ==
Race/ethnicity
Race/ethnicity	2000		2010		2020	
Race/ethnicity	Number	%	Number	%	Number	%
White alone	4,584	88.07	4,301	82.02	4,280	76.84
Black alone	156	3.00	222	4.23	237	4.25
Hispanic or Latino (any race)	116	2.23	347	6.62	518	9.30
Native American alone	33	0.63	24	0.46	51	0.92
Asian alone	197	3.78	197	3.76	151	2.71
Other race alone	5	0.10	11	0.21	24	0.43
Pacific Islander alone	12	0.23	1	0.02	0	0.00
Two or more races	102	1.96	141	2.69	309	5.55
Total	5,205	100.0	5,244	100.0	5,570	100.0

== Notable features ==
Saint Anthony Parkway runs along the southern border of the Waite Park neighborhood and is part of the Minneapolis Grand Rounds Scenic Byway. Parks in the neighborhood include Waite Park, Deming Heights Park, and Cavell Park.
