= Northeast, Minneapolis =

Community of Minneapolis

Northeast
- Community
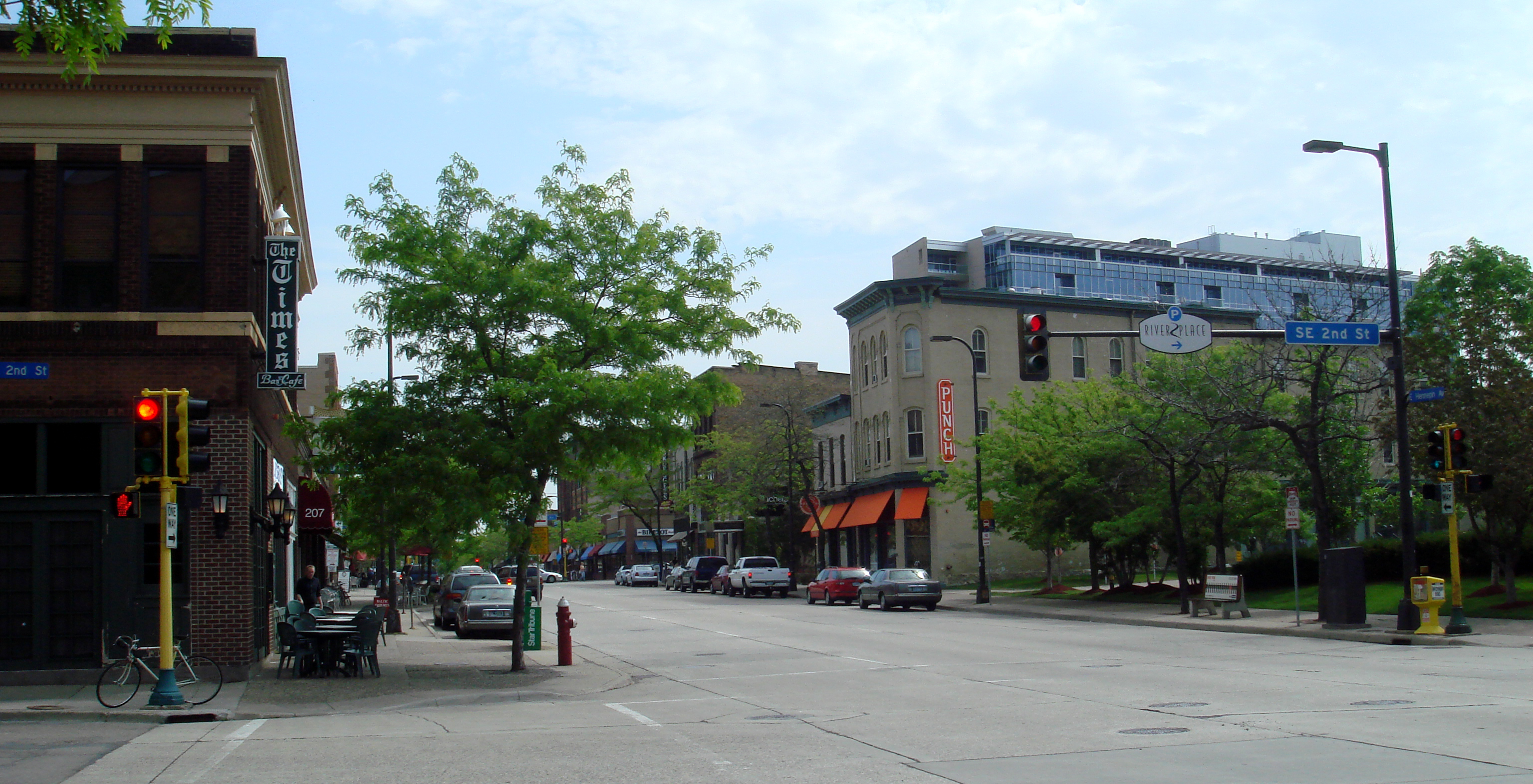
- East Hennepin Avenue, looking north to the birthplace of Nordeast
- Nicknames: Nordeast, Old St. Anthony
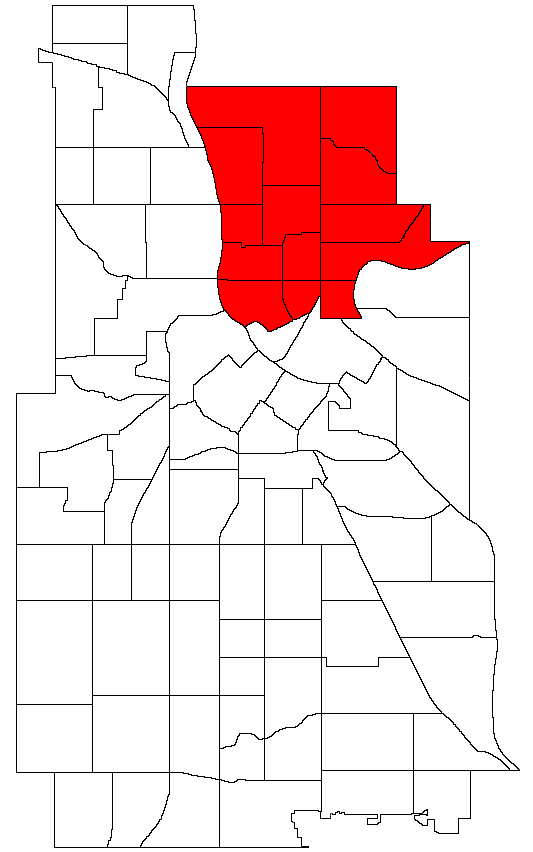
- Northeast Community location within the City of Minneapolis
- Interactive map of Northeast
- Coordinates: 44°59′14″N 93°15′16″W
- Country: United States
- State: Minnesota
- County: Hennepin
- City: Minneapolis
- Founded: 1848
- Founder: Franklin Steele
- Named for: Saint Anthony Falls
- City Council Wards: 1, 3
- Neighborhoods: List: Audubon Park; Beltrami; Bottineau; Columbia Park; Holland; Logan Park; Marshall Terrace; Northeast Park; Sheridan; St. Anthony East; St. Anthony West; Waite Park; Windom Park

Government
  - Council Member, Ward 1: Elliott Payne
  - Council Member, Ward 3: Michael Rainville

Area
  - Total: 7.502 sq mi (19.43 km^{2})
- Elevation: 974 ft (297 m)

Population (2020)
  - Total: 38,410
  - Density: 5,120/sq mi (1,977/km^{2})
- Time zone: UTC-6 (CST)
  - Summer (DST): UTC-5 (CDT)
- Postal code: 55413, 55414, 55418, 55421
- Area code: 612
- Website: https://www.ci.minneapolis.mn.us/neighborhoods/

Northeast is one of the eleven official communities of the U.S. city of Minneapolis, Minnesota. It is composed of 13 smaller neighborhoods whose street addresses end in "NE". Unofficially, it also includes the neighborhoods of the University community which have "NE" addresses, and the entirety of the Old Saint Anthony business district, which sits on the dividing line of "NE" and "SE" addresses. In the wider community, this business district, which is the oldest settlement in the city, is often identified as the heart of Northeast, in part because it lies across the Mississippi River from Downtown Minneapolis. Northeast is sometimes referred to as "Nordeast", reflecting the history of northern and eastern European immigrants and their language influence.

The modern community includes commercial districts stretching along the major corridors of University Avenue, Central Avenue, East Hennepin Avenue, Broadway Street, and Stinson and New Brighton Boulevards towards the city limits. Blending a heritage of old architecture, classic housing, bustling commercial streets, and industrial work centers, along with new residential high-rises, suburban cul-de-sacs, big-box retail, and a popular art scene, Northeast offers diverse amenities as part bedroom neighborhood and job center for the city of Minneapolis. The prominent features of Northeast include ornate Eastern European influenced churches and massive grain silos and mills. Mostly built around the late 19th to early 20th century, these structures shadow the landscape of modest Victorians and four story apartments.

The area was the City of St. Anthony before it was annexed into Minneapolis, and is thus sometimes confused with the city named Saint Anthony which abuts Northeast Minneapolis on the northeast, or Saint Anthony Park, a Saint Paul neighborhood that is located to the southeast.

== History ==
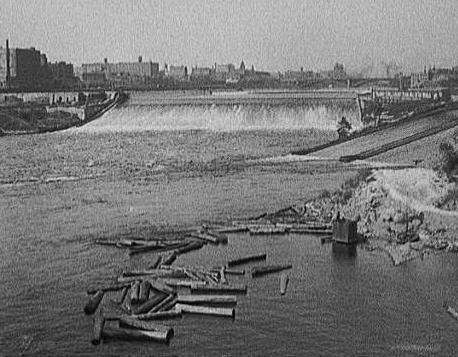
Saint Anthony Falls, 1908

In 1848, Franklin Steele purchased the land that would become St. Anthony and, with the help of Ard Godfrey, built the first commercial mill at Saint Anthony Falls on the east bank. This place marked the original northernmost navigable point of the Mississippi River. The falls provided a dependable power source and soon many mills had been constructed there and the nickname "Mill City" was born. The land west of the Mississippi was opened for settlement in 1852, and when people started settling it, St. Anthony found it had a competitor across the river. St. Anthony was incorporated in 1855, twelve years before neighboring Minneapolis. St. Anthony and Minneapolis existed as separate cities until 1872 when they agreed to merge under the name of Minneapolis. The former St. Anthony became Northeast Minneapolis and a township north of the city incorporated under the name St. Anthony.

Northeast has undergone several reinvestment periods of infrastructure. In the 1970s, the area approached nearly a hundred years of settlement earlier than the rest of the city. The next few decades carried massive condo development which echoed the rising architecture in downtown Minneapolis. Starting in 1990, the Neighborhood Revitalization Program assisted neighborhood organizations, residents, and businesses to utilize grants and loans to complete construction, alteration or improvement projects and the city invested in new streets and urban landscaping.

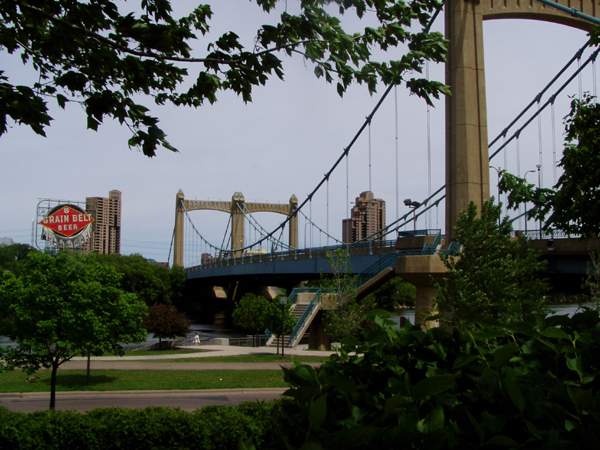
The gateway to Northeast: the Hennepin Avenue Bridge and the landmark Grain Belt Beer sign.

The area also has a history of historic preservation. In the 1960s, a proposal to build a freeway through the area was fought. The proposed freeway, Interstate 335, would connect I-94 in north Minneapolis to I-35W north of the University of Minnesota. Land was bought and cleared with residents relocating before the project was finally defeated by local residents and activists. Ultimately new housing and industrial buildings were built on the cleared land. Soon after, a historic preservation district was enacted on the site of the Pillsbury A Mill, stretching east to nearby Marcy Holmes.

In the 1980s and 1990s, artists leaving the North Loop due to increasing costs of living flocked to Northeast, moving to warehouses to make dual spaces for work and living. When the Surly Law allowed breweries in Minnesota to open tap rooms in 2011, the area saw an influx of breweries. Following these changes, the area has been highlighted in studies of gentrification.

== Geography ==
The community is bounded by the city limits of Minneapolis on the north and east, by the Mississippi River on the west, and irregularly by a combination of streets and rail lines on the south. It does not include the Old Saint Anthony business district, which is entirely located within the University community. These official borders are established policy by the city. The Neighborhood Revitalization Program follows these borders.

The community is mostly located within City Council Ward 1, though parts in the south of the community are located in Ward 3. Ward 1 is currently represented by Elliott Payne and Ward 3 by Michael Rainville.

The name "Northeast" originally came from the city's street-naming system. Streets suffixed "North", "South", "East", and "West" are all located west of the Mississippi River, while streets east of the river are suffixed "Northeast" and "Southeast". The dividing line between these two suffixes is East Hennepin Avenue. Under this scheme, Northeast does not include all of the Old Saint Anthony business district, as much of that area (which includes landmarks such as Nye's Polonaise Room) is on the "Southeast" side of that street. The Northeast Minneapolis Chamber of Commerce only identifies with the northeast streets.

The business district of Old Saint Anthony is commonly known as Northeast. The business association changed its name from the Old Saint Anthony Association to the NorthEast Business Association in 2007, even though it does not include businesses in most of the Northeast community.

A spot at 974 feet (297 m) in or near Waite Park in Northeast Minneapolis is corroborated by Google Earth as the highest ground in all of Minneapolis.

== Demographics ==
Historical population
Census	Pop.	Note	%±
1980	37,507		—
1990	36,515		−2.6%
2000	36,913		1.1%
2010	36,255		−1.8%
2020	38,410		5.9%

Northeast Minneapolis has been a traditionally working class area populated by immigrants of Lebanese, Polish, Finnish, German, Slovak, Russian, and Ukrainian descent who were drawn into the area first by employment opportunities that the grain mills and sawmills along the river offered, and later by rail and factory jobs across the city. By 1930, immigrants made up nearly 60% of Northeast's total population. The Eastern European immigrants, particularly the Poles with whom Northeast is most often associated, had a profound influence on the cultural life of Minneapolis.

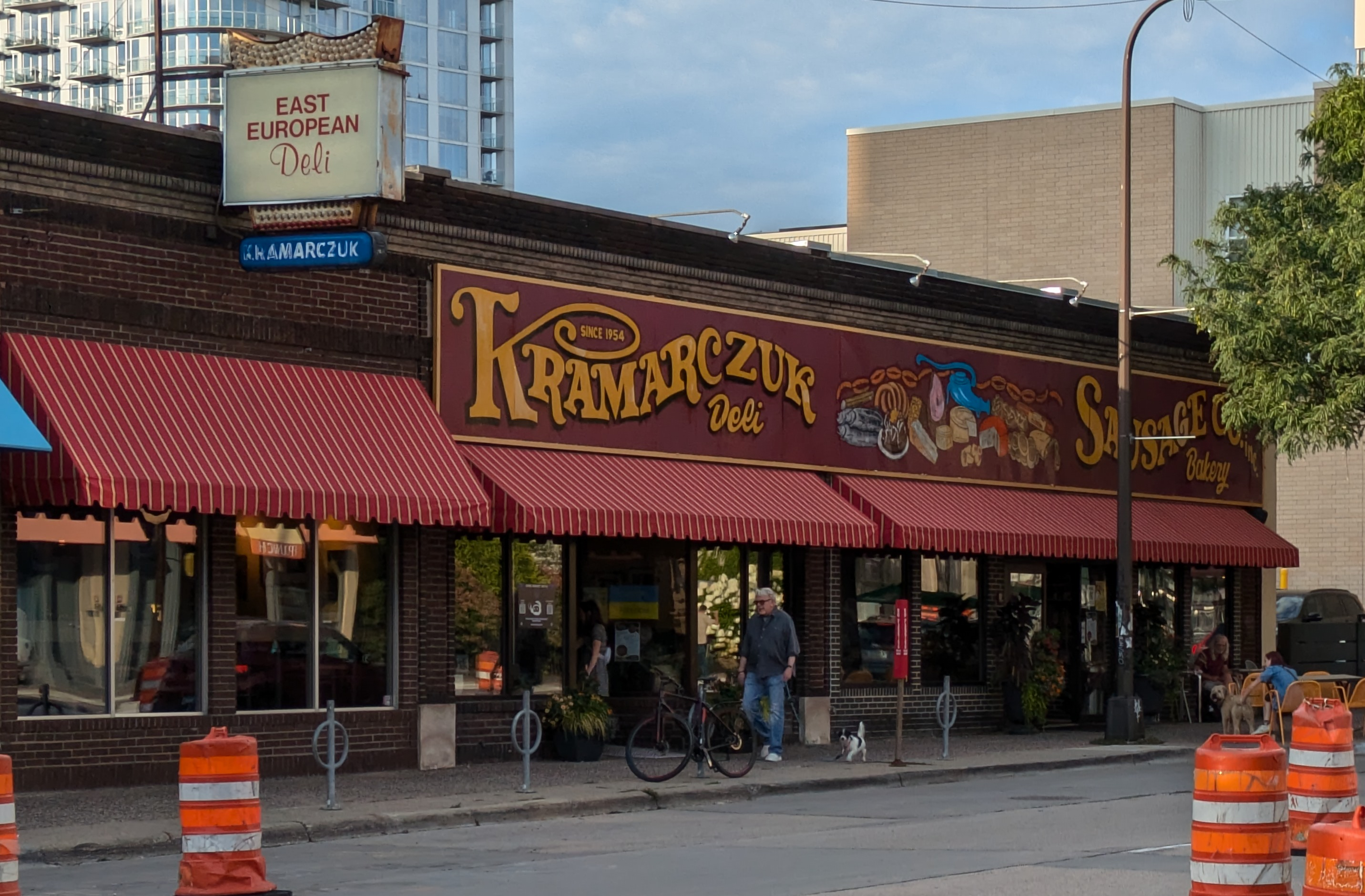
Kramarczuk's Deli

The Polish presence in "Nordeast" remains strong, including the names of local businesses that still bear the mark of the area's Eastern European population such as Kramarczuk's Deli, Siwek Lumber, Sentyrz Market and Surdyk's Liquors. The Adam Mickiewicz Polish Saturday School holds classes during the school year at Holy Cross Church. For many years, the Polish American Cultural Institute of Minnesota library and headquarters were located in Northeast Minneapolis on Central Avenue, but have moved to a location in the old Saint Anthony riverfront that has an "SE" address within the Nicollet Island/East Bank neighborhood of the University community. After some years of absence, the famous Twin Cities Polish Festival returned to the area the weekend of August 15–16, 2009. The festival is operated largely due to volunteer work from the Dolina Polish Folk Dancers, a performing group whose members are deeply interwoven with the Northeast Polish community.

The Ukrainian American Community Center (UACC) is located in Northeast, near B.F. Nelson Park. The UACC hosts an annual festival celebrating Ukrainian culture and food.

In recent years, the demographics of Northeast have changed, the population becoming younger and more diverse, while retaining a stable base of old "Nordeast" families, often in their third or fourth generation. Students attending the nearby University of Minnesota frequently rent and many have settled. Seventy-nine percent of housing in the area is owner-occupied, which has continued to contribute to the stability of neighborhoods. African Americans have migrated from the north side to Northeast's more stable neighborhoods and affordable housing opportunities. New immigrant groups of a variety of nationalities, especially Somalis and Latin Americans, have continued the tradition of Northeast as a haven for immigrants. In particular, Northeast Minneapolis is a center of Minneapolis's Ecuadorian community, one of the largest in the nation, with an influx of Ecuadorian immigrants and refugees to Northeast leading to some areas being designated as an ethnic enclave nicknamed "Little Cuenca", after the city of origin of many of the migrants. A large number of Tibetan immigrants live in Northeast and the nearby suburb Columbia Heights, originally refugees from political upheaval in their homeland. Minnesota now has the second largest concentration of Tibetans in the United States.

== Economy ==
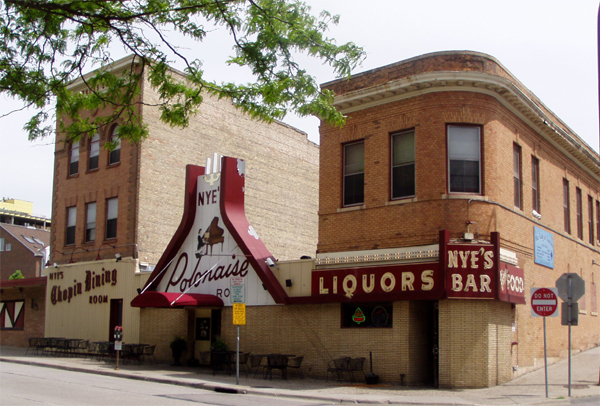
Nye's Polonaise Room, a longtime polka bar, was demolished in 2017

Northeast has long been a blue-collar part of the Twin Cities. Its industrial base has shrunk, but it remains a major part of the area's economy. Major industrial facilities in Northeast include Canadian Pacific Railway's Shoreham Yards, Burlington Northern's rail yards, fluid handling systems manufacturer Graco's world headquarters, Xcel Energy's Riverside power plant, and a Honeywell Aerospace plant.

One of the major changes in the 1990s and 2000s is the conversion of industrial infrastructure to residential, office or arts use. All of the major artists' studio complexes in Northeast are former industrial spaces, as are several major residential projects (such as the Madison Lofts between Monroe and Madison Avenues, and the Cream of Wheat Lofts at Stinson Boulevard and Broadway Ave). Other buildings along Stinson Boulevard and East Hennepin Avenue, and in the Riverfront area, have been converted from industrial to office space.

Starting in the late 1990s, restaurants and shops catering to an audience outside the long-established local population have re-energized many business districts in Northeast Minneapolis. These newer businesses often operate side by side with older establishments from the earlier era (for example long-time Northeast institutions such as Kramarczuk's Sausage Company in the Old St Anthony district sit near more recent arrivals).

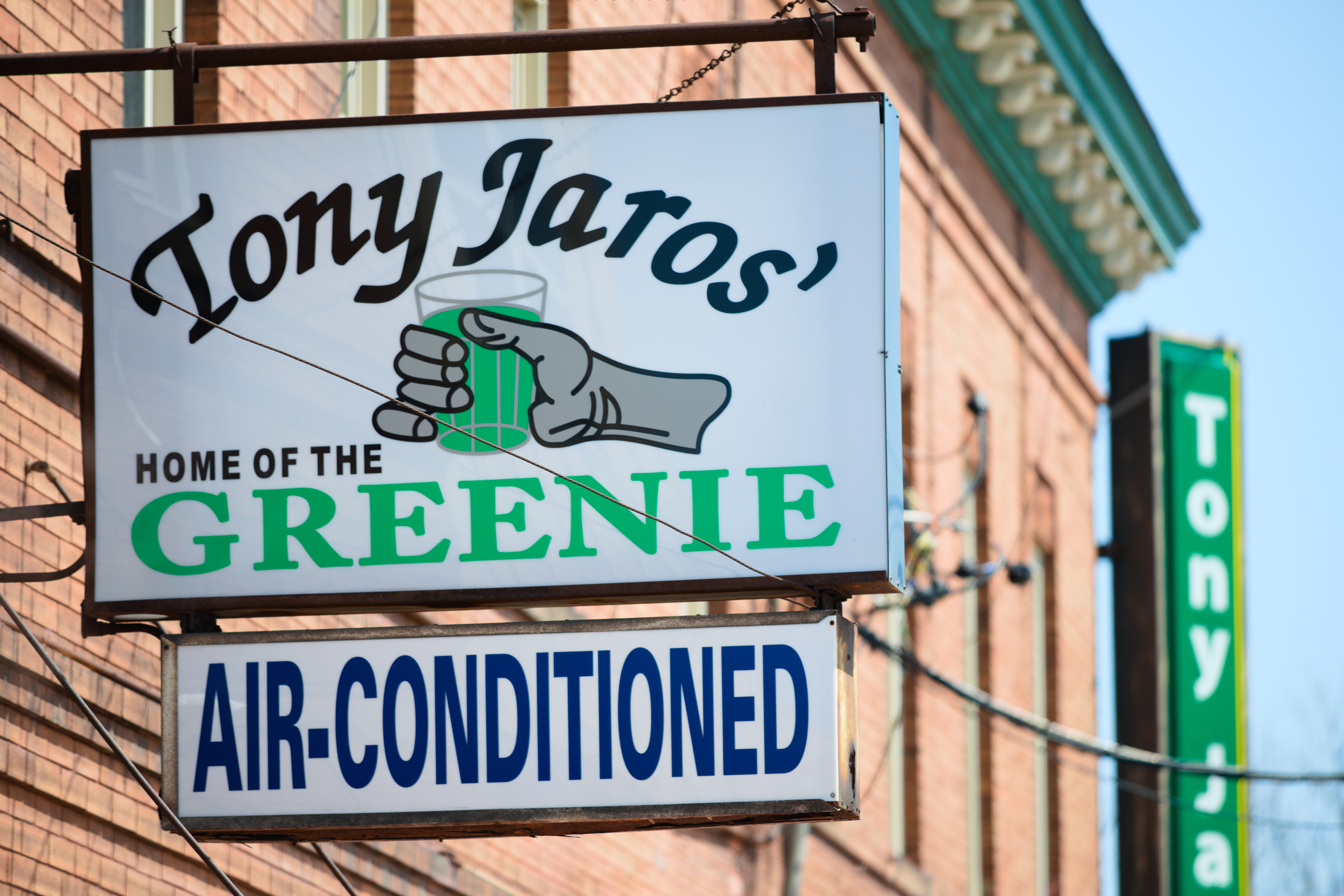
Tony Jaros' River Garden, in the Marshall Terrace neighborhood of Northeast

Other shopping districts in Northeast with significant new energy from newer restaurants, boutiques, and galleries are 13th Avenue between 2nd Street and 4th Street (the commercial heart of the Arts District) and the 29th Avenue and Johnson Street area. Neighborhood bars were and still are a prominent feature of the community. Of particular note are Gasthof zur Gemütlichkeit/Mario's Keller Bar, and Tony Jaros' River Garden. Nye's Polonaise (named the "Best Bar in America" by Esquire Magazine) was a longtime favorite bar of the community, from 1949 until closing in April 2016.

The new orientation of Northeast Minneapolis to welcome "outsiders" is perhaps best seen in the 1991 Hennepin Avenue Bridge. The new suspension bridge is styled after the first permanent bridge across the Mississippi River (at the same site), also a suspension bridge.

The stretch of Central Avenue between 18th Avenue and 27th Avenue is more mixed in its redevelopment. Since 2000, several major new mixed-use developments have been made (and more are in development), and many new restaurants, mostly featuring foreign cuisines, have joined an already eclectic mix. Specialty food markets are also a major feature of the area, including major Latin American, South Asian, and Middle Eastern markets and the Eastside Food Co-op. However, many retail spaces continue to alternate between vacancy and short-lived retail, and much of the older physical infrastructure has become run down. The revitalization has also spread into neighboring Columbia Heights. Much of which can be attributed to the Heights Theater. Some new coffee shops and eateries have popped up on the Minneapolis side of 37th Avenue NE.

The Johnson Street Quarry, an abandoned brownfield site bounded by Johnson Street on the west, 18th Avenue on the north, New Brighton Boulevard on the east, and I-35W on the south, was remediated in 1996 and the Quarry Shopping Center opened a year later with big-box stores such as Rainbow Foods (in 2014 converted to Cub Foods), Target and Home Depot. The band The Hold Steady mentions the Quarry in its song "Southtown Girls".

== Arts ==
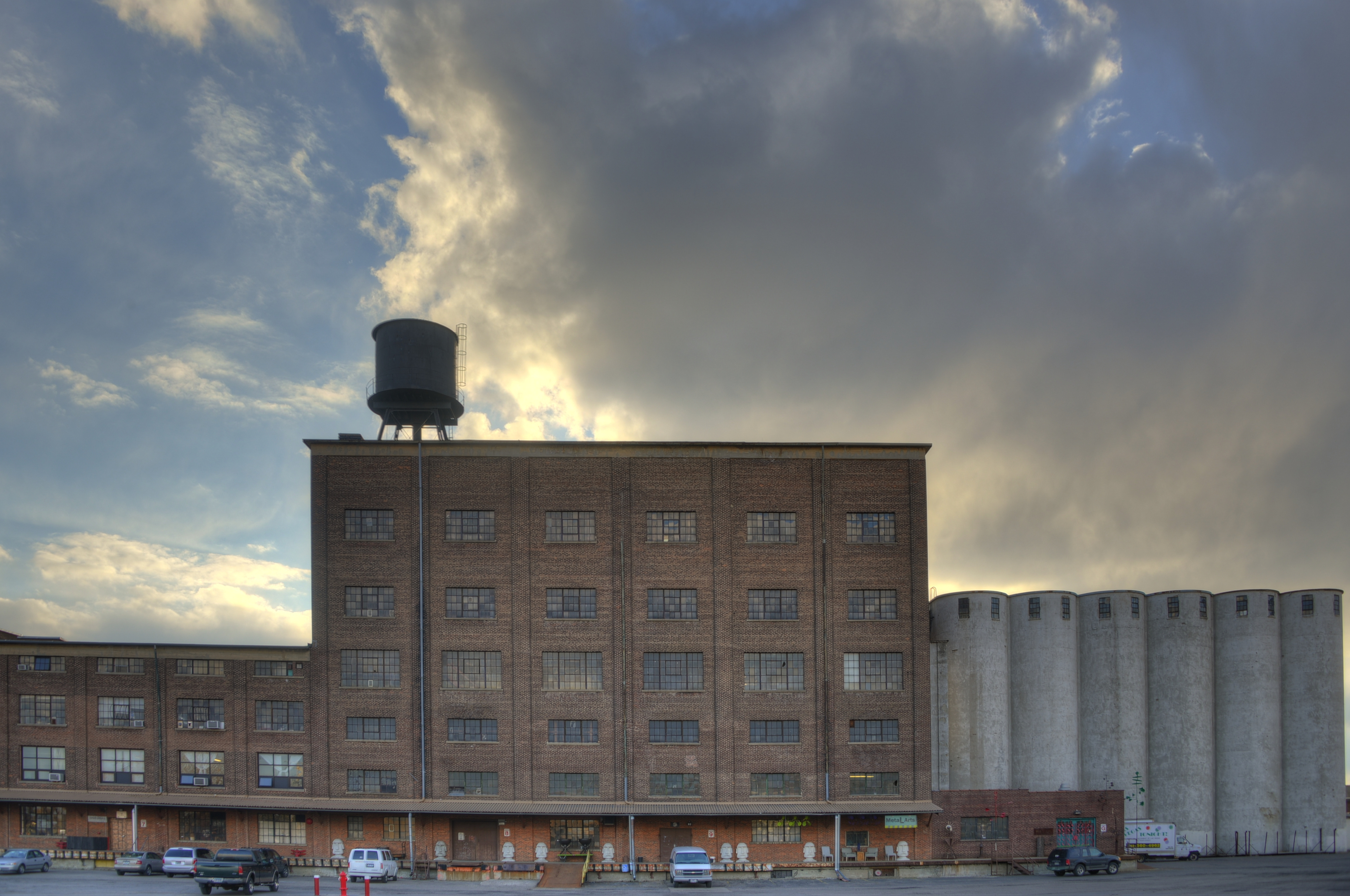
Northrup-King's former Jackson Street facility, now home to art studios and art galleries.

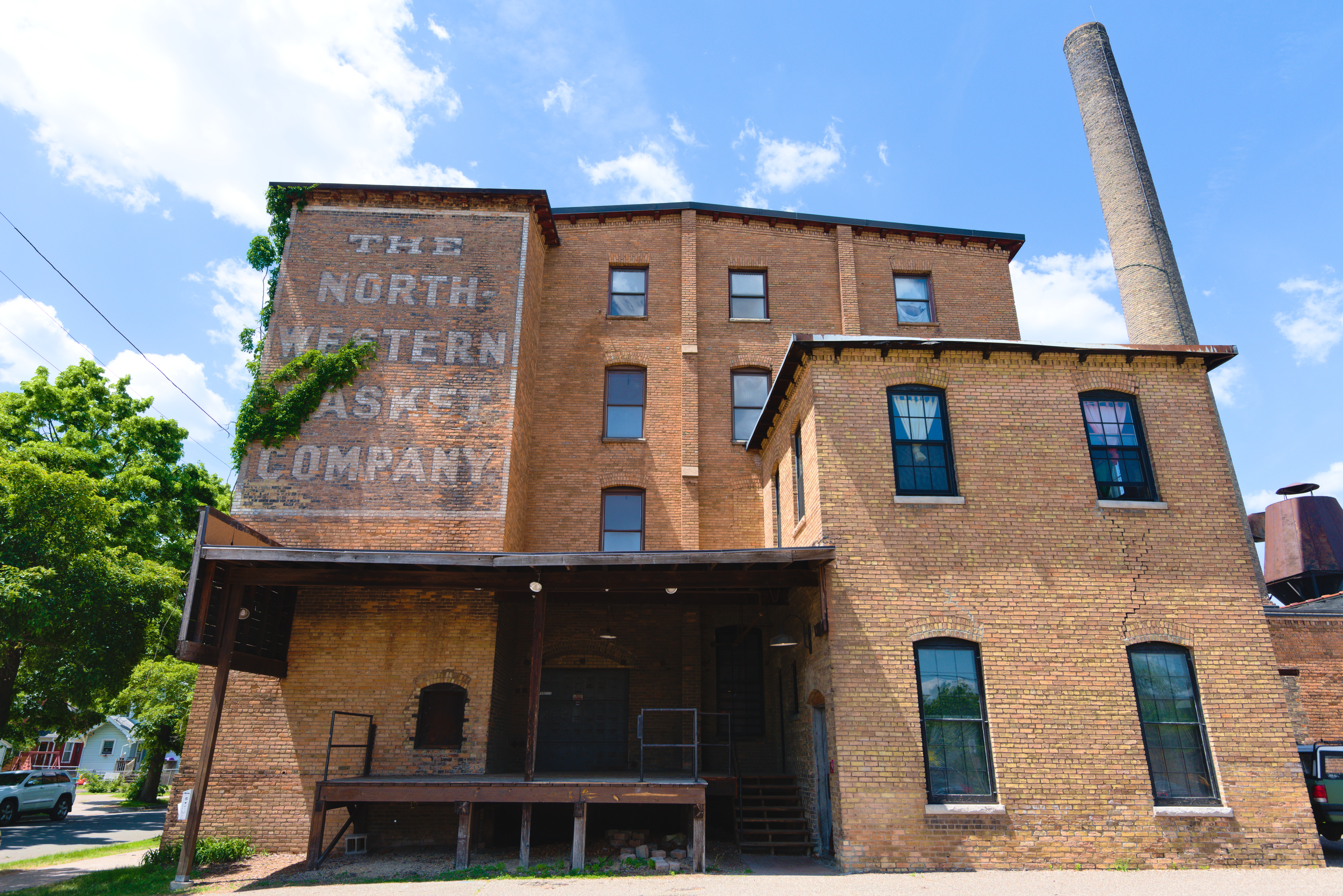
Casket Arts Building.

In the past decades, Northeast has developed an artist community. Galleries and studios now occupy many historic industrial buildings including the Northrup King Building. The structure started in 1917 for the Northrup-King & Co. seed company and finally comprised 10 interconnected buildings that shipped seeds across the United States. Now, it is the home of over 135 tenants, including 100 artists and including small business and nonprofit organizations. Other buildings with large numbers of art and design related tenants include the Grain Belt Brewery complex, the California Building, Thorp Building, the 2010 Artblok, and the Casket Arts Building.

Another notable arts building is on Quincy Street, the Q'arma Building, which houses Altered Esthetics, an art gallery that works to sustain the historical role of artists as a true voice of society through exhibits and special programs. The gallery hosts new art shows each month with themes as varied as Day of the Dead, Video Game Art, and The Art of Service. Local and international artists alike compete for space in the juried and non-juried artistic shows.

The recent arts influence is expressed by "Art-A-Whirl", an art crawl the third week of May that has existed for 30 years, encompassing 400 art studios. The Northeast Minneapolis Arts Association (NEMAA), which has run Art-A-Whirl since 1996, was instrumental in establishing the Northeast Minneapolis Arts District, bounded by Central Avenue, Broadway, the Mississippi River and 26th Avenue. This geographic area was officially recognized as an Arts District by declaration of the City of Minneapolis in 2002.

In performing arts, the Ritz Theater, on 13th Avenue Northeast, is home to Theater Latté Da, a musical theatre company presenting original and reimagined musical theatre. The historic venue, renovated in 2006, has brought life to the 13th Avenue Business District and seen the addition of many shops and restaurants since its renovation.

== Religion ==
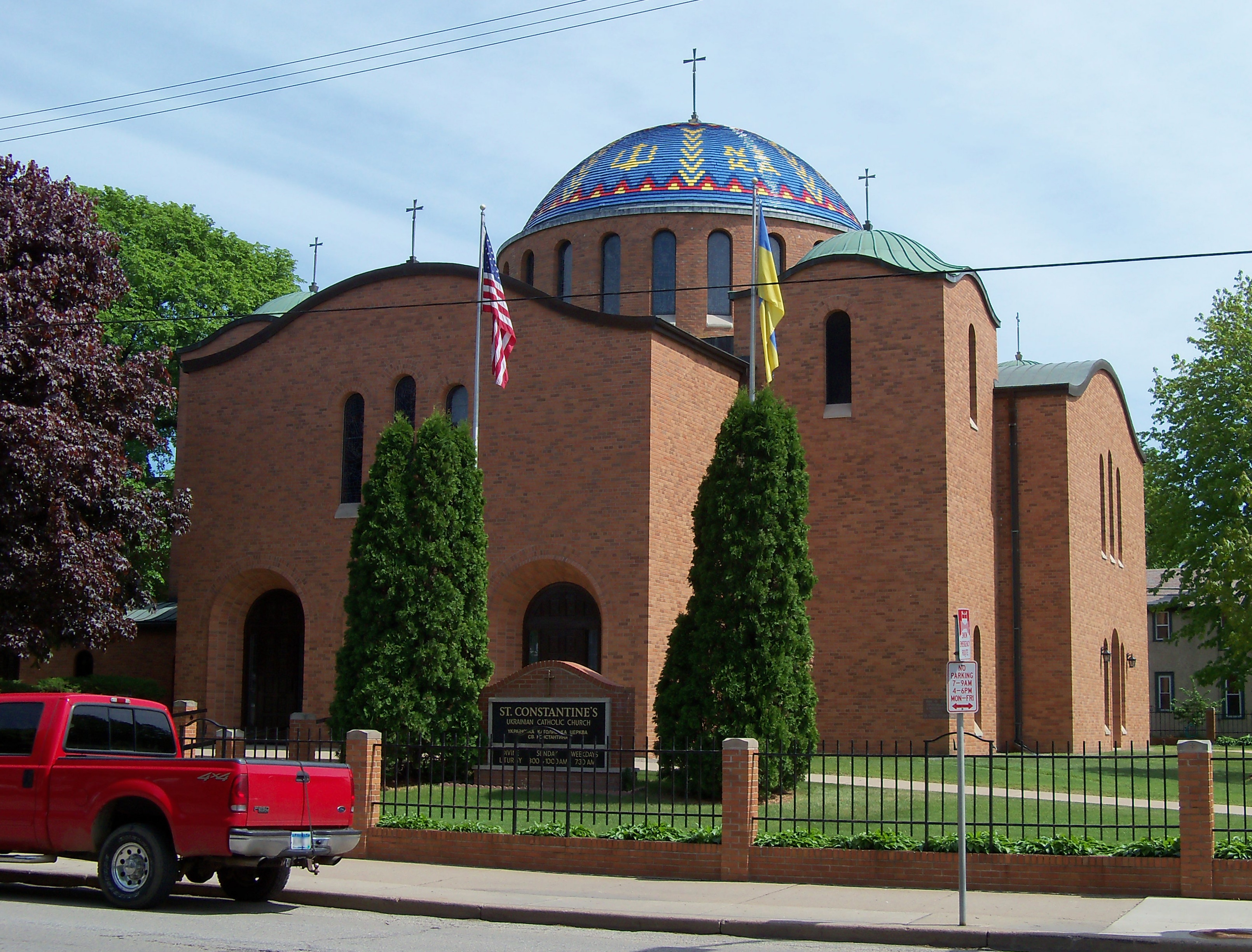
St. Constantine's Ukrainian Catholic church.

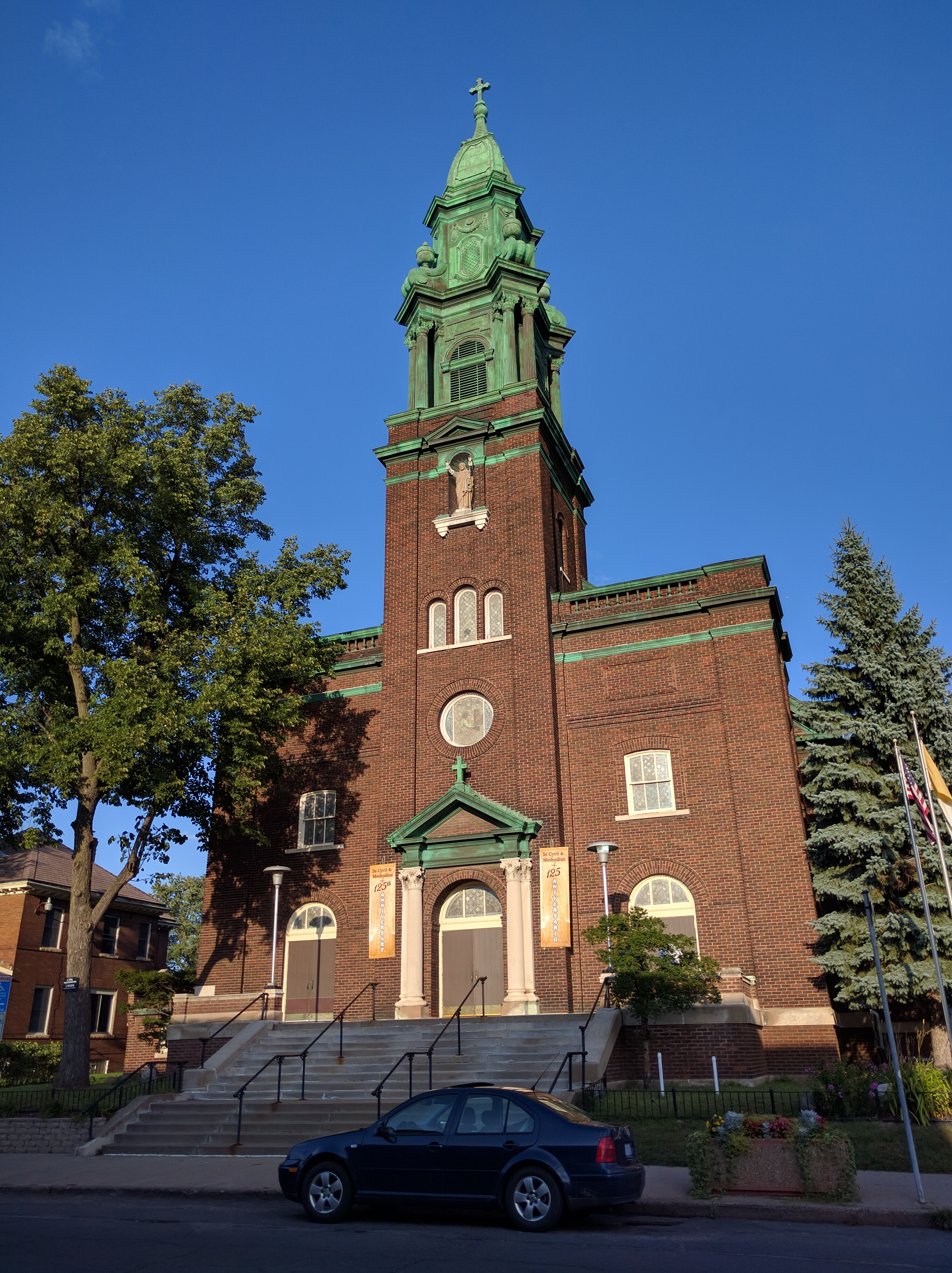
St. Cyril and Methodius Catholic Church

Northeast Minneapolis also became known for its large number of churches, including Minneapolis' first church, Our Lady of Lourdes Church built on land donated by Pierre Bottineau and founded in 1849 as the First Universalist Society; the church was purchased by French Canadians and became Catholic in 1877. Four of Minneapolis' five historical Polish churches are in Northeast: Holy Cross, All Saints, St. Hedwig, and Sacred Heart of Jesus Polish National Catholic Church. Holy Cross has a thriving Polish ministry staffed by the Society of Christ and continues to have Mass in Polish. A significant number of Polish Americans also belonged to St. Anthony of Padua, as well as those of Irish descent. The Italian community is associated with Our Lady of Mount Carmel and St. Clement. The Slovak community and a growing Latino community are associated with Ss. Cyril & Methodius. Other ethnic Catholic churches include St. Maron (Lebanese), St. John's Byzantine Rite (Rusyn), St. Constantine's (Ukrainian), and St. Boniface (German).

In October 2010, the Archdiocese of Saint Paul and Minneapolis announced a Strategic Plan which would merge Holy Cross, St. Hedwig and St. Clement into St. Anthony of Padua. The decision was met with significant opposition, with a number of appeals being sent to Archbishop John C. Nienstedt. One appeal, organized by the Polish Committee at Holy Cross, was signed by over 400 people. As a result, Archbishop Nienstedt issued a new decree on November 15, 2010, which extended the deadline for the merger to be enacted until July 2013, emphasized that Mass in Polish would continue in the merged parish, and ordered that after the merger that St. Anthony change its name to Holy Cross. Parishioners from St. Hedwig and Holy Cross appealed this second decree, requesting that their parishes be left out of the merger. Approximately 800 people signed this second appeal. In a December 27, 2010, letter, Archbishop Nienstedt rejected this appeal. As a result, Holy Cross parishioners organized an appeal to the Vatican's Congregation for Clergy. Over 1,000 people signed this appeal. In January 2011, the Congregation accepted the appeal for consideration. In late July, the Congregation found that Archbishop Nienstedt's decree did not violate canon law. This decision was appealed to the Apostolic Signature, which upheld the Congregation's ruling in mid-2012. Formal appeals exhausted, some continued to call upon Archbishop Nienstedt to remove Holy Cross and St. Hedwig's from the merger. He declined to do so and suggested that such appeals were based more on nationalism than on concern for the Catholic faith. The merger of the four parishes was finalized on July 1, 2013, with the merged parish being named Holy Cross.

The Polish-American media, notably the Polish American Journal and Kurier Polski of Minnesota, covered the opposition to the Holy Cross merger extensively. Minnesota media also reported on an August 6, 2011, public rally against the merger of parishes in front of the St. Paul Cathedral. Approximately 75 people participated in the rally, mostly Holy Cross supporters, while some were from St. Austin Parish in North Minneapolis (which was absorbed by St. Bridget Parish on January 1, 2012). This rally was the largest public expression of opposition to the Archdiocese's Strategic Plan. The Northeaster newspaper printed an editorial critical of the Holy Cross merger on August 10, 2011. Leaflets against the merger were distributed in Northeast on at least three occasions.

Northeast was also the site of significant developments in the history of the Orthodox Church in the United States. It was here that St. Alexis Toth founded the first Orthodox seminary in the United States at St. Mary's Orthodox Cathedral. St. Alexis had been an Eastern Rite (Ruthenian) Catholic priest, who after a confrontation with the Roman Catholic Archbishop of St. Paul, John Ireland, converted to the Russian Orthodox Church. St. Alexis is responsible for the conversion of approximately 20,000 Eastern Rite Catholics to Orthodoxy. The Orthodox Church in America canonized St. Alexis in 1994. There are no known efforts underway to canonize Archbishop John Ireland in the Roman Catholic Church. Presently, there are two Orthodox churches in Northeast: St. Mary's Orthodox Cathedral (associated with St. Alexis) and St. Michael and St. George Ukrainian Orthodox Church.

Gyuto Wheel of Dharma Monastery, on Taylor Street in Northeast, is the first Tibetan Gyuto Monastery in the United States.

The Sacred Heart of Jesus Polish National Catholic Church was destroyed by a fire on April 19, 2021, which was investigated as a possible arson.

== Education ==
Minneapolis Public Schools (MPS) serves Northeast. MPS students are able to attend community schools, based on their home address, or magnet schools for specific identities or interests. The following schools are located in Northeast or contain parts of Northeast in their attendance area:

=== Public elementary schools ===
- Las Estrellas Dual Language Elementary School
- Pillsbury Elementary School
- Waite Park Elementary School
- Webster Elementary School

=== Public middle school ===
- Northeast Middle School

=== Public high schools ===
- Edison High School
- Camden High School and North Community High School give second priority to students in Edison's attendance area.
- Menlo Park Alternative School
  - an MPS contract alternative school located in East Side Neighborhood Services.
- VOA High School
  - an MPS contract alternative school run in collaboration with Volunteers of America, located at 2300 Kennedy Street NE.

=== Charter schools ===
- Spero Academy (K-6)
- Banaadir Elementary (K-5)
- New City School
- Exploration High School
- Yinghua Academy (K-8)

== Media ==
The Northeaster, the longest-established community newspaper in the area, serves not only Northeast Minneapolis, but also the neighboring suburbs of Columbia Heights, Hilltop, and St Anthony.

== Official neighborhoods of Northeast community ==
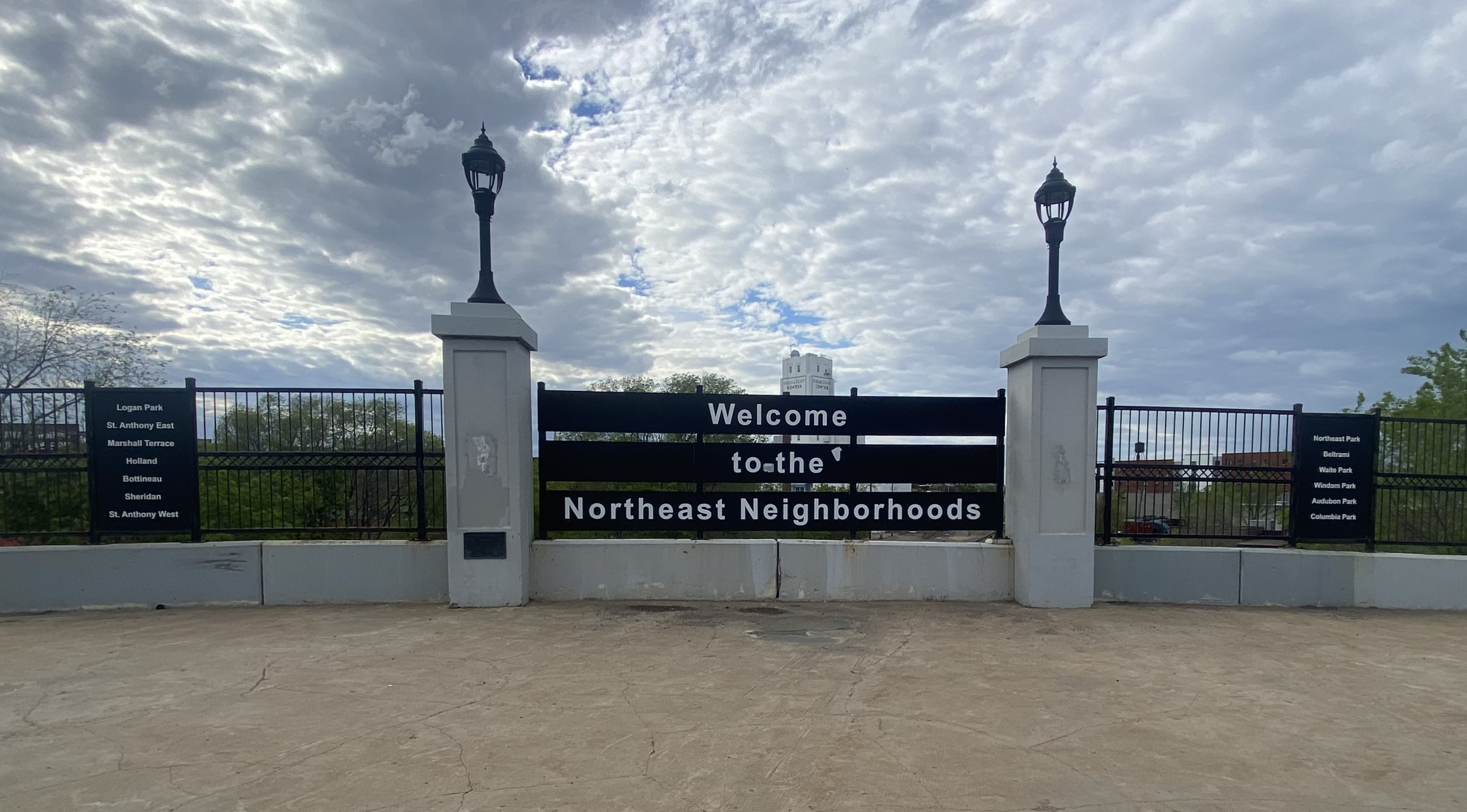
A sign on Central Avenue NE and Broadway Street NE welcomes visitors and lists the neighborhoods of Northeast

- Audubon Park
- Beltrami
- Bottineau
- Columbia Park
- Holland
- Logan Park
- Marshall Terrace
- Northeast Park
- St. Anthony East
- St. Anthony West
- Sheridan
- Waite Park
- Windom Park
