= Sheridan, Minneapolis =

Coordinates: 45.0023°N 93.2664°W

Sheridan
- Neighborhood
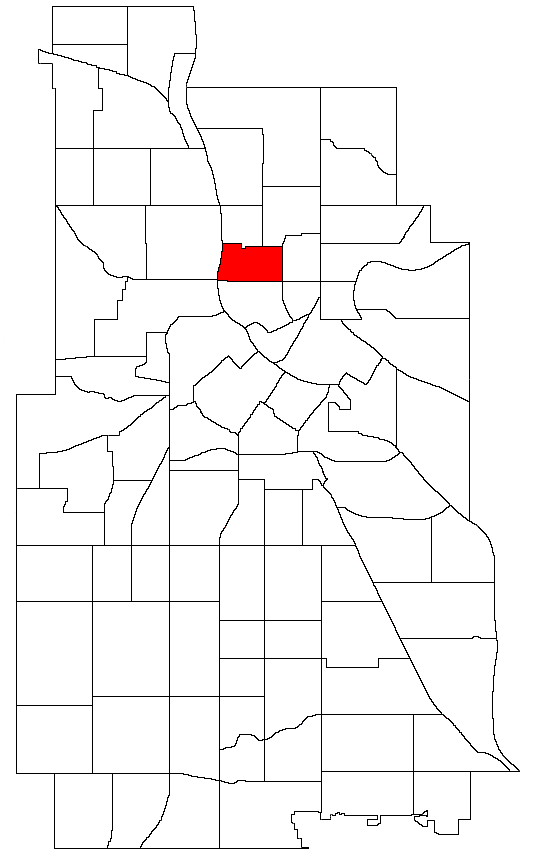
- Location of Sheridan within the U.S. city of Minneapolis
- Interactive map of Sheridan
- Country: United States
- State: Minnesota
- County: Hennepin
- City: Minneapolis
- Community: Northeast
- City Council Ward: 3

Government
  - Council Member: Michael Rainville

Area
  - Total: 0.314 sq mi (0.81 km^{2})

Population (2020)
  - Total: 3,302
  - Density: 10,500/sq mi (4,060/km^{2})
- Time zone: UTC-6 (CST)
  - Summer (DST): UTC-5 (CDT)
- ZIP code: 55413, 55418
- Area code: 612

Historical population
Census	Pop.	Note	%±
1980	2,900		—
1990	2,752		−5.1%
2000	2,703		−1.8%
2010	2,884		6.7%
2020	3,302		14.5%

Sheridan is a neighborhood in the Northeast community of Minneapolis.

== Location and characteristics ==
Sheridan's boundaries are 17th and 18th Avenues NE to the north, Washington Street to the east, Broadway Street NE to the south, and the Mississippi River to the west. It is located in Ward 3, currently represented by council member Michael Rainville. Sheridan is also considered part of the Northeast Minneapolis Arts District.

Sheridan has a community garden with rentable plots and a mega-plot that's used to grow organic food for the community.

== History ==
Sheridan is named for Civil War general Philip Sheridan.

Portions of the Sheridan neighborhood were actually part of the former city of St. Anthony, Minnesota which was annexed by Minneapolis in 1872. Many of the area's initial settlers were immigrants from Eastern and Northern Europe who worked in nearby industries including grain mills, lumber mills, breweries and railroads.

The neighborhood's housing was largely built between the 1890s and 1930s and includes a mixture of single and multi-family homes. More recently, many of the neighborhood's industrial spaces have been redeveloped into artist studios and the commercial strip along 13th Avenue NE has been revitalized.

== Demographics ==
Race/ethnicity
Race/ethnicity	2000		2010		2020	
Race/ethnicity	Number	%	Number	%	Number	%
White alone	2,006	74.21	1,857	64.39	2,410	72.26
Black alone	142	5.25	472	16.37	455	13.65
Hispanic or Latino (any race)	303	11.21	339	11.75	228	6.84
Native American alone	75	2.77	53	1.84	19	0.57
Asian alone	80	2.96	52	1.80	55	1.65
Other race alone	6	0.22	5	0.17	14	0.42
Pacific Islander alone	7	0.26	4	0.14	0	0.00
Two or more races	84	3.11	102	3.54	153	4.59
Total	2,703	100.0	2,884	100.0	3,334	100.0

== Landmarks ==
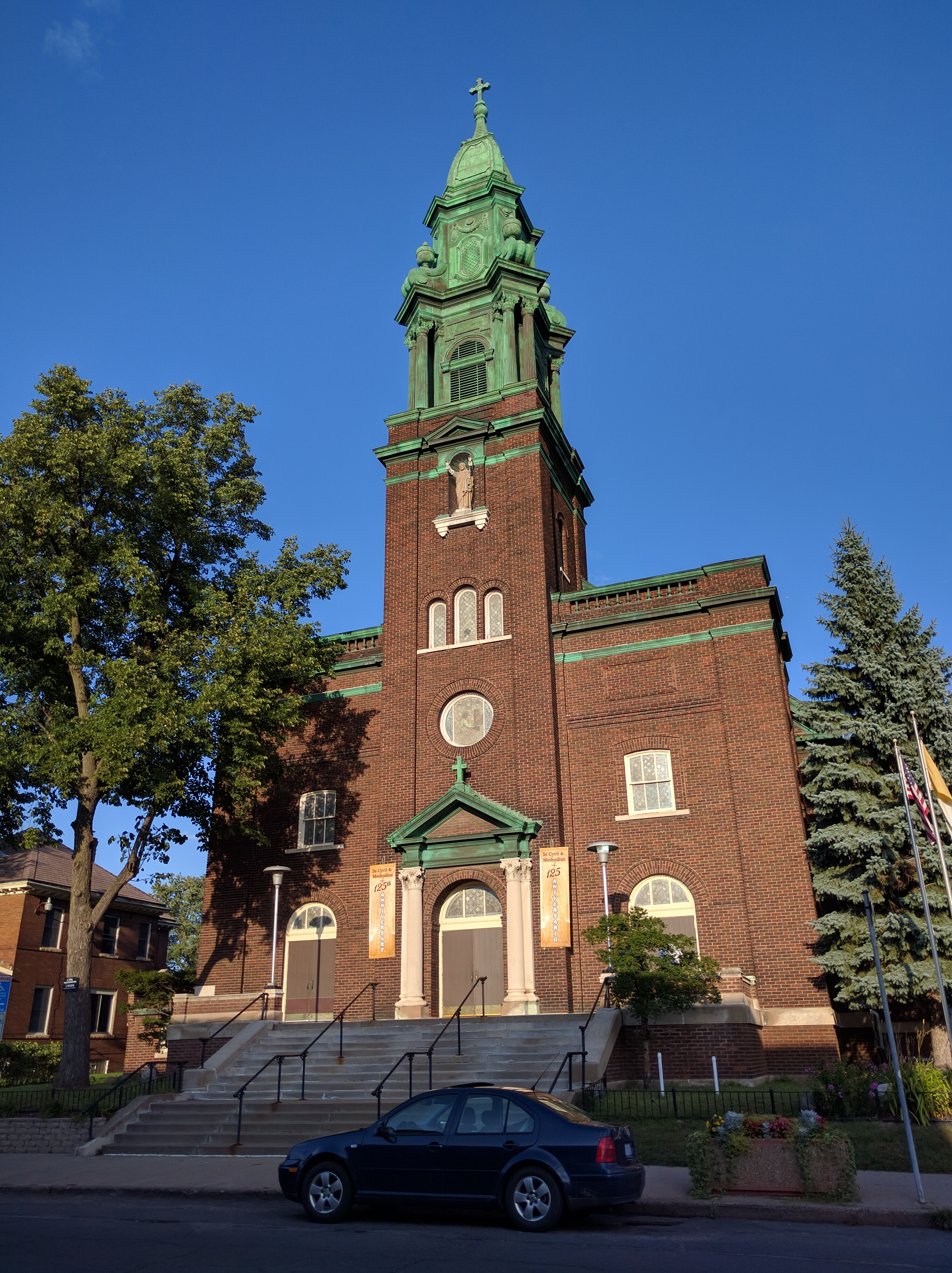
St. Cyril and Methodius Catholic Church

Sheridan is home to Sheridan Global Arts and Communication School (K-8) as well as the New City Charter School (K-8).

13th Avenue NE is the neighborhood's commercial center. In the early 2000s, the street has seen a revival with many formerly empty spaces being converted into restaurants, bars, galleries and small businesses.

The former Minneapolis Brewing Company complex has been redeveloped into offices, studios, apartments and the Pierre Bottineau branch of the Hennepin County Library. Sheridan Memorial Park is located behind the Minneapolis Brewing Company complex on the Mississippi River.

== Transportation ==
Sheridan is served by Metro Transit bus routes 11 (2nd Street NE), 17 (Washington Street) and 30 (Broadway Street). 5th Street NE is a bicycle boulevard and a short separated bike path runs along 18th Ave NE.
