= Altered Esthetics =

Altered Esthetics is a non-profit, community-based art gallery and arts advocacy organization in the Northeast Minneapolis Arts District. According to its mission statement, its goal is to support and expand the vibrant Minneapolis arts community by hosting exhibitions, creating and sponsoring various art programs, and participating in community art events.

== History and development ==
Altered Esthetics was originally conceived as an exhibition venue where the focus would be on "art for art's sake" as opposed to art for profit. Founded by Jamie Schumacher, it opened in April 2004 in Minneapolis with the inaugural exhibition "The Art of War", featuring the work of 15 local artists.

The organization has grown significantly since 2004. Its staff of about 100 are all volunteers. Its board of directors has 18 active members. Due to its contributed growth since 2004, it was moved in late 2006 to the Q'arma Building in Northeast Minneapolis' arts district. In May 2007, it received 501(c)3 non-profit status. In addition to its physical gallery, it maintains an online gallery featuring additional artists.

== Exhibitions and internship programs ==
Over the past six years, Altered Esthetics has hosted over 50 group exhibitions focusing on fine art, music, poetry, performance art and film. It has presented the work of over 1,000 national and international artists, including such notable artists as Manuel Ocampo and J.M. Culver. Its exhibitions have addressed such diverse themes as banned books, comic art, gender, and activism in the arts.

In 2007, Altered Esthetics began a curatorial internship program to offer artists, students and community members hands-on experience in the arts. In 2008, a Gallery Director internship program was created whose goal is to provide participants with experience in grant writing, fundraising, and other aspects of running non-profit arts organizations.

== Community presence ==
In 2009, Altered Esthetics hosted 14 exhibits, drawing over 2,000 people to the Minneapolis arts district. It is also a participant in the arts district's Art-A-Whirl, the country's largest open-studio tour, attended by over 20,000 people.
