= Columbia Park, Minneapolis =

Coordinates: 45.0258°N 93.2589°W

Columbia Park
- Neighborhood
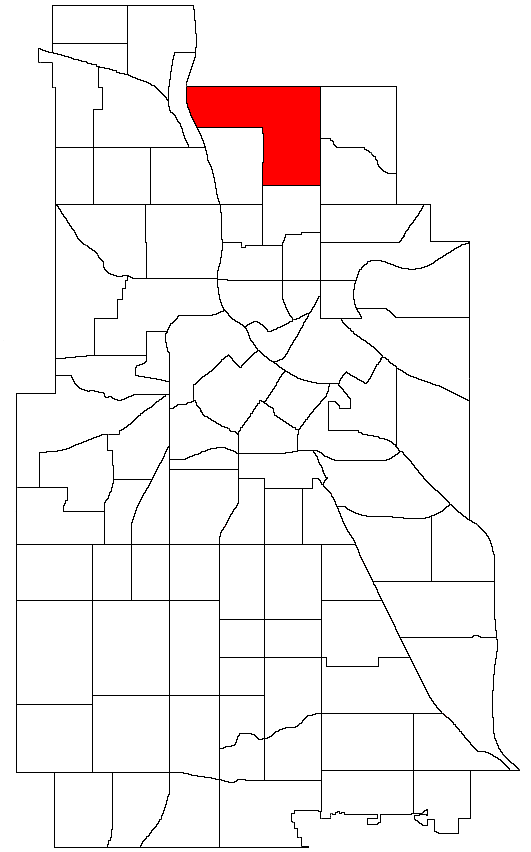
- Location of Columbia Park within the U.S. city of Minneapolis
- Interactive map of Columbia Park
- Country: United States
- State: Minnesota
- County: Hennepin
- City: Minneapolis
- Community: Northeast
- City Council Ward: 1

Government
  - Council Member: Elliott Payne

Area
  - Total: 1.501 sq mi (3.89 km^{2})

Population (2020)
  - Total: 1,477
  - Density: 984.0/sq mi (379.9/km^{2})
- Time zone: UTC-6 (CST)
  - Summer (DST): UTC-5 (CDT)
- ZIP code: 55418
- Area code: 612

Historical population
Census	Pop.	Note	%±
1980	1,770		—
1990	1,674		−5.4%
2000	1,834		9.6%
2010	1,563		−14.8%
2020	1,477		−5.5%

Columbia Park is a neighborhood in the Northeast community in Minneapolis. Its boundaries are 37th Avenue NE to the north, Central Avenue to the east, 27th Avenue NE to the south, and both University Avenue & Saint Anthony Parkway streets to the west. It is one of ten neighborhoods in Ward 1 of Minneapolis, currently represented by the Council President, Elliott Payne.

== Location and characteristics ==
Columbia Park is an L-shaped neighborhood whose boundaries are 37th Avenue NE (the border between Minneapolis and Columbia Heights) to the north, Central Avenue to the east, 27th Avenue NE and St. Anthony Boulevard to the south and University Avenue, 4th Street NE and the Mississippi River to the west. It is named after three related items: Columbia Park itself (located within its borders), the park's acquisition in 1892 (the so-called "Columbian" year celebrating the 400th anniversary of Christopher Columbus's arrival in the New World) and the adjacent suburb of Columbia Heights.

Much of the area of Columbia Park is the park itself with residential areas situated north and west of it and industrial and railroad land located to the south of it. Most of the neighborhood's housing stock dates to the 1940s-1960s with some older Tudor and colonial style homes located on Columbia Parkway immediately north of the park.

== Demographics ==
Race/ethnicity
Race/ethnicity	2000		2010		2020	
Race/ethnicity	Number	%	Number	%	Number	%
White alone	1,449	79.01	1,190	76.14	1,087	71.19
Black alone	123	6.71	144	9.21	155	10.15
Hispanic or Latino (any race)	93	5.07	89	5.69	130	8.51
Native American alone	47	2.56	21	1.34	9	0.59
Asian alone	54	2.94	50	3.20	47	3.08
Other race alone	6	0.33	4	0.26	6	0.39
Pacific Islander alone	0	0.00	0	0.00	4	0.26
Two or more races	62	3.38	65	4.16	89	5.83
Total	1,834	100.0	1,563	100.0	1,527	100.0

== Landmarks ==
Columbia Park is a 183 acres (0.74 km^{2}) park complex including Columbia Golf Course, paths and trails, a playground, picnic area, dog park and other amenities. Prior to the park's development, the location was home to a large shallow lake named "Lake Sandy" or "Sandy Lake." It was gradually drained and filled in as the park was further developed, disappearing from city maps by 1914-1915.

Small businesses are scattered through the neighborhood and also situated along Central Avenue.

== Transportation ==
Columbia Park is served by Metro Transit bus routes 10 (Central Avenue) and 11 (37th Ave NE/University Ave). St. Anthony Parkway, Columbia Park and parts of University Avenue and Central Avenue have bike paths.
