= Bottineau, Minneapolis =

Coordinates: 45.0081°N 93.2683°W

Bottineau
- Neighborhood
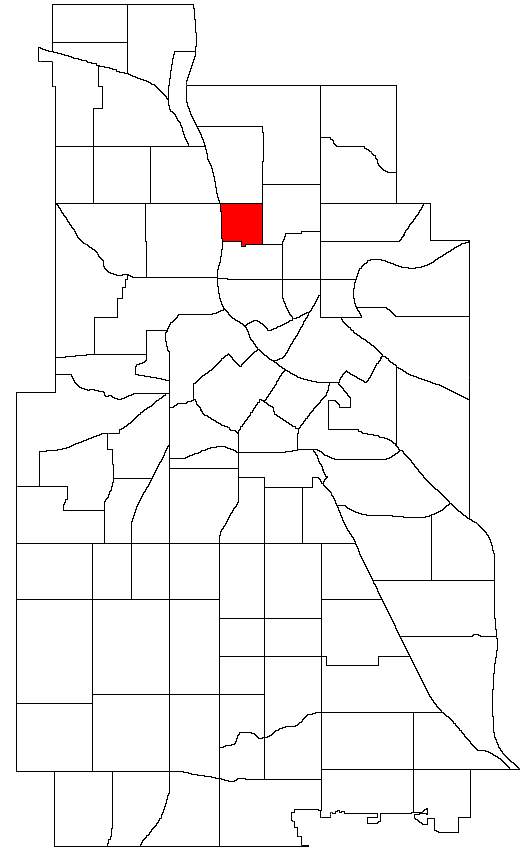
- Location of Bottineau within the U.S. city of Minneapolis
- Interactive map of Bottineau
- Country: United States
- State: Minnesota
- County: Hennepin
- City: Minneapolis
- Community: Northeast
- City Council Ward: 1

Government
  - Council Member: Elliott Payne

Area
  - Total: 0.283 sq mi (0.73 km^{2})

Population (2020)
  - Total: 1,640
  - Density: 5,800/sq mi (2,240/km^{2})
- Time zone: UTC-6 (CST)
  - Summer (DST): UTC-5 (CDT)
- ZIP code: 55413, 55418
- Area code: 612

Historical population
Census	Pop.	Note	%±
1980	1,152		—
1990	1,150		−0.2%
2000	1,254		9.0%
2010	1,656		32.1%
2020	1,640		−1.0%

Bottineau is a neighborhood in the Northeast community of Minneapolis. It is one of ten neighborhoods in Ward 1 of Minneapolis, currently represented by Council President Elliott Payne.

== Location and characteristics ==
Bottineau's boundaries are Lowry Avenue NE to the north, University Avenue NE to the east, 16th and 17th Avenues NE to the south, and the Mississippi River to the west. The neighborhood is named for its founder, Minnesota frontiersman Pierre Bottineau, who purchased land in the area in 1845.

The neighborhood's location along the Mississippi River made it an ideal site for industry including grain mills, lumber mills and breweries. During the late 1800s and early 1900s the neighborhood became more residential (aided by an expansion of the city's streetcar system up 2nd Street NE). Bottineau suffered somewhat during the white flight of the 1950s and 1960s as many of the neighborhood's small businesses closed and single family homes were converted into multiple unit rental properties. Beginning in the 1980s, artists began to move to the neighborhood and converted formerly industrial spaces into studios. Today the neighborhood is a mixture of housing, studios/offices, and small businesses and is considered part of the Northeast Minneapolis Arts District.

== Demographics ==
Race/ethnicity
Race/ethnicity	2000		2010		2020	
Race/ethnicity	Number	%	Number	%	Number	%
White alone	887	70.73	752	45.41	843	47.33
Black alone	68	5.42	614	37.08	631	35.43
Hispanic or Latino (any race)	151	12.04	158	9.54	196	11.01
Native American alone	47	3.75	25	1.51	8	0.45
Asian alone	65	5.18	60	3.62	39	2.19
Other race alone	0	0.00	6	0.36	5	0.28
Pacific Islander alone	0	0.00	0	0.00	0	0.00
Two or more races	36	2.87	41	2.48	59	3.31
Total	1,254	100.0	1,656	100.0	1,781	100.0

== Landmarks ==
Bottineau is home to three city parks: Bottineau Park, Edgewater Park and Gluek Park. Two charter schools are located in the neighborhood: New Visions School (K-8) and Menlo Park Academy (10-12). Many businesses are situated along University Avenue and Lowry Avenue.

The neighborhood's California Building was one of the first buildings in the area to be converted into artist spaces and remains so today.

== Transportation ==
Bottineau is served by Metro Transit bus routes 11 (2nd Street NE) and 32 (Lowry Avenue). 22nd Avenue NE is a bicycle boulevard and a short separated bike path runs along 18th Ave NE.
