= Marshall Terrace, Minneapolis =

Coordinates: 45.0176°N 93.2735°W

Marshall Terrace
- Neighborhood
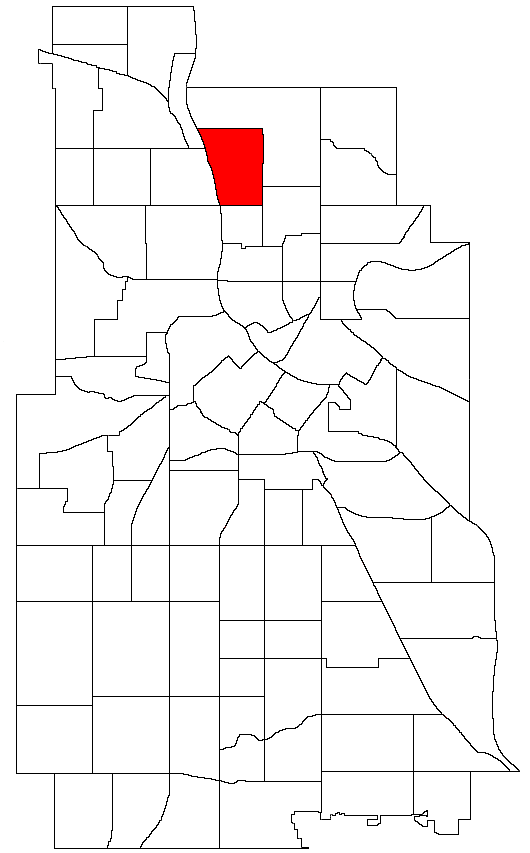
- Location of Marshall Terrace within the U.S. city of Minneapolis
- Interactive map of Marshall Terrace
- Country: United States
- State: Minnesota
- County: Hennepin
- City: Minneapolis
- Community: Northeast
- Founded: 1849
- City Council Ward: 1

Government
  - Council Member: Elliott Payne

Area
  - Total: 0.711 sq mi (1.84 km^{2})

Population (2020)
  - Total: 1,482
  - Density: 2,080/sq mi (805/km^{2})
- Time zone: UTC-6 (CST)
  - Summer (DST): UTC-5 (CDT)
- ZIP code: 55418
- Area code: 612

Historical population
Census	Pop.	Note	%±
1980	1,418		—
1990	1,297		−8.5%
2000	1,342		3.5%
2010	1,381		2.9%
2020	1,482		7.3%

Marshall Terrace is a neighborhood in the Northeast community in Minneapolis. It is one of ten neighborhoods in Ward 1 of Minneapolis, currently represented by Council President Elliott Payne.

== Location and characteristics ==
Marshall Terrace's boundaries are Saint Anthony Parkway to the north, 4th Street and University Avenue to the east, Lowry Avenue to the south, and the Mississippi River to the west. It is named for former Minnesota governor William Rainey Marshall.

Much of Marshall Terrace is reserved for industrial use with utilities and industries situated along the western border and railroad tracks along the east. Its housing was developed in the early 20th century to provide homes for those working in nearby industries and is concentrated in the central part of the neighborhood. The housing stock consists largely of smaller single family homes.

== Demographics ==
Race/ethnicity
Race/ethnicity	2000		2010		2020	
Race/ethnicity	Number	%	Number	%	Number	%
White alone	996	74.22	899	65.10	983	67.89
Black alone	86	6.41	162	11.73	172	11.88
Hispanic or Latino (any race)	110	8.20	129	9.34	118	8.15
Native American alone	40	2.98	62	4.49	13	0.90
Asian alone	62	4.62	57	4.13	74	5.11
Other race alone	0	0.00	9	0.65	13	0.90
Pacific Islander alone	0	0.00	1	0.07	1	0.07
Two or more races	48	3.58	62	4.49	74	5.11
Total	1,342	100.0	1,381	100.0	1,448	100.0

== Landmarks ==
Marshall Terrace has two parks located along the Mississippi River: Marshall Terrace Park and Marshall Terrace Gardens. The Grand Rounds Scenic Byway also runs along St. Anthony Parkway on the neighborhood's northern border.

== Transportation ==
The neighborhood is served by Metro Transit bus routes 11 (2nd Street NE/Grand Street NE) and 32 (Lowry Avenue). St. Anthony Parkway and part of University Avenue have separated bike paths.
