= Audubon Park, Minneapolis =

Coordinates: 45.0171°N 93.2377°W

Audubon Park
- Neighborhood
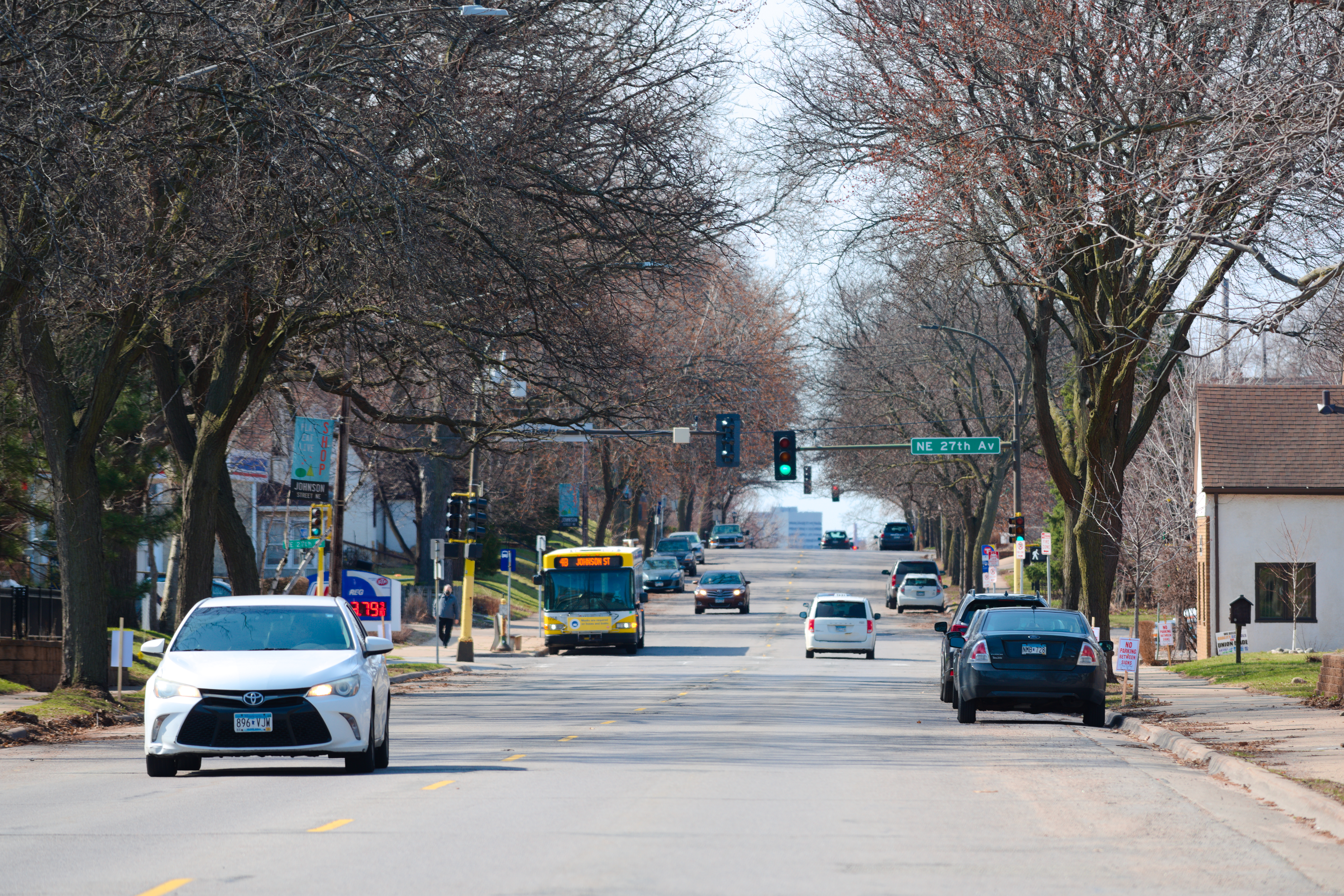
- Johnson Street in Audubon Park, Minneapolis

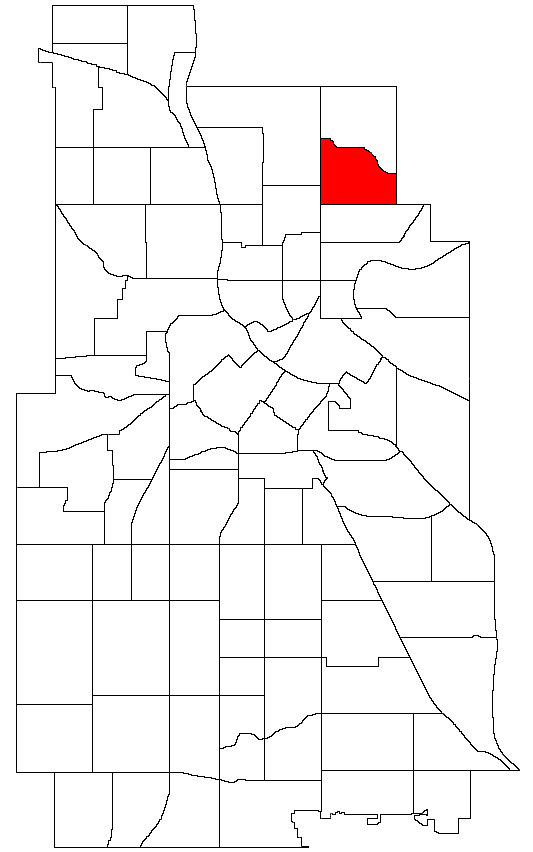
- Location of Audubon Park within the U.S. city of Minneapolis
- Interactive map of Audubon Park
- Country: United States
- State: Minnesota
- County: Hennepin
- City: Minneapolis
- Community: Northeast
- City Council Ward: 1

Government
  - Council Member: Elliott Payne

Area
  - Total: 0.665 sq mi (1.72 km^{2})

Population (2020)
  - Total: 5,414
  - Density: 8,140/sq mi (3,140/km^{2})
- Time zone: UTC-6 (CST)
  - Summer (DST): UTC-5 (CDT)
- ZIP code: 55418
- Area code: 612

Historical population
Census	Pop.	Note	%±
1980	5,924		—
1990	5,667		−4.3%
2000	5,256		−7.3%
2010	4,962		−5.6%
2020	5,414		9.1%

The Audubon Park neighborhood is located in the Northeast community in Minneapolis. Audubon Park is one of ten neighborhoods in Ward 1 of Minneapolis, currently represented by Council President Elliott Payne. The neighborhood is bounded by Saint Anthony Parkway to the north, NE Stinson Parkway to the east, NE Lowry Avenue to the south, and Central Avenue to the west. Stinson Parkway and St. Anthony Parkway are both part of the Grand Rounds National Scenic Byway. Stinson Parkway is also the city's border with St. Anthony.

Audubon Park is also the name of the only city park located entirely within the boundaries of the Audubon Park neighborhood. The park and neighborhood are named in honor of John James Audubon, a great American naturalist and ornithologist. A majority of the houses in this relatively hilly neighborhood were built in the 1940s.

The neighborhood is home to the Hollywood Theater, a historic building listed on the U.S. National Register of Historic Places.

== Demographics ==
Race/ethnicity
Race/ethnicity	2000		2010		2020	
Race/ethnicity	Number	%	Number	%	Number	%
White alone	4,235	80.57	3,919	78.98	4,168	76.52
Black alone	244	4.64	279	5.62	334	6.13
Hispanic or Latino (any race)	380	7.23	400	8.06	483	8.87
Native American alone	62	1.18	49	0.99	31	0.57
Asian alone	154	2.93	117	2.36	115	2.11
Other race alone	12	0.23	11	0.22	30	0.55
Pacific Islander alone	5	0.10	3	0.06	4	0.07
Two or more races	164	3.12	184	3.71	282	5.18
Total	5,256	100.0	4,962	100.0	5,447	100.0

== Gallery ==
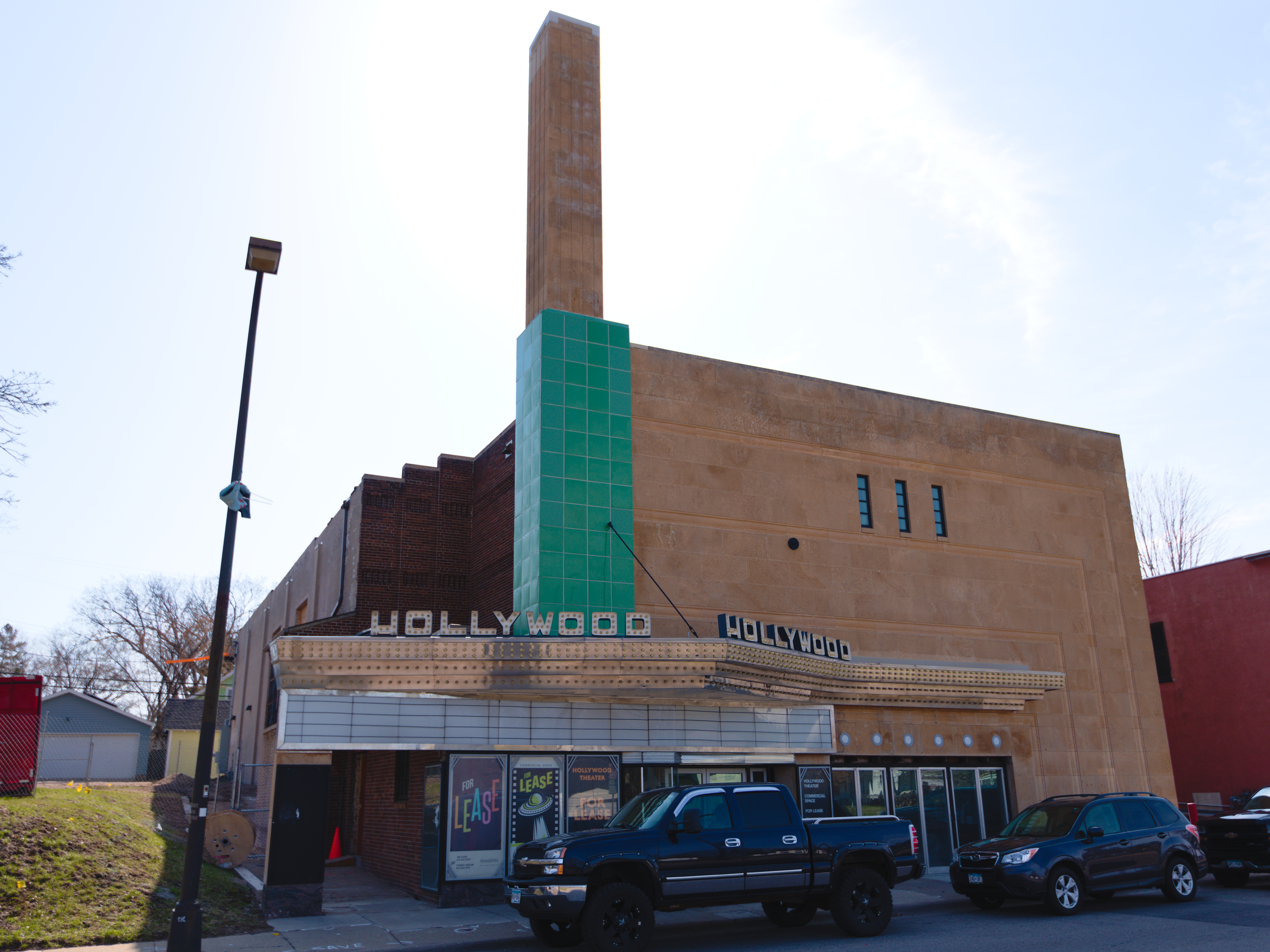
Hollywood Theater

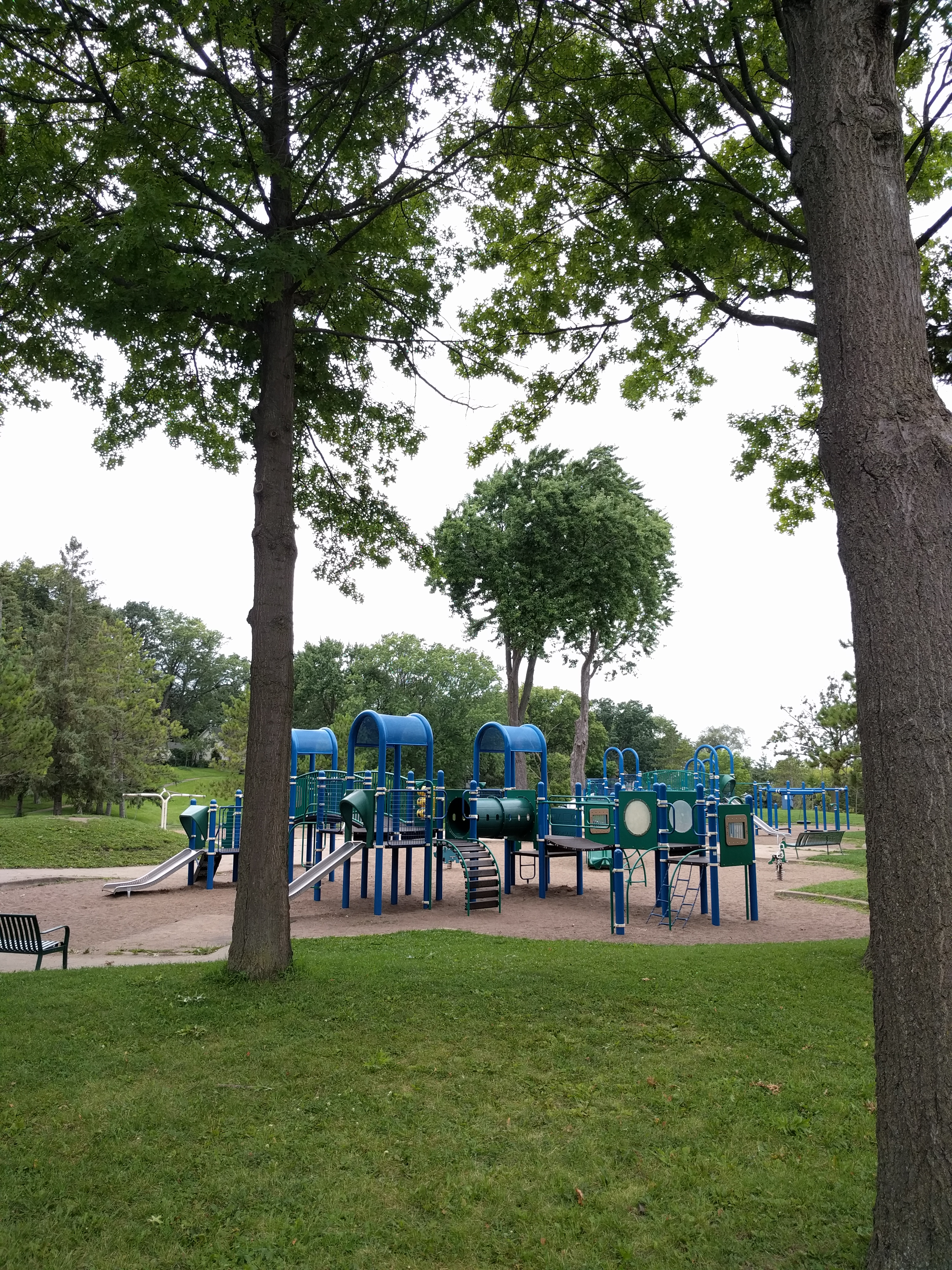
Playground at Audubon Park

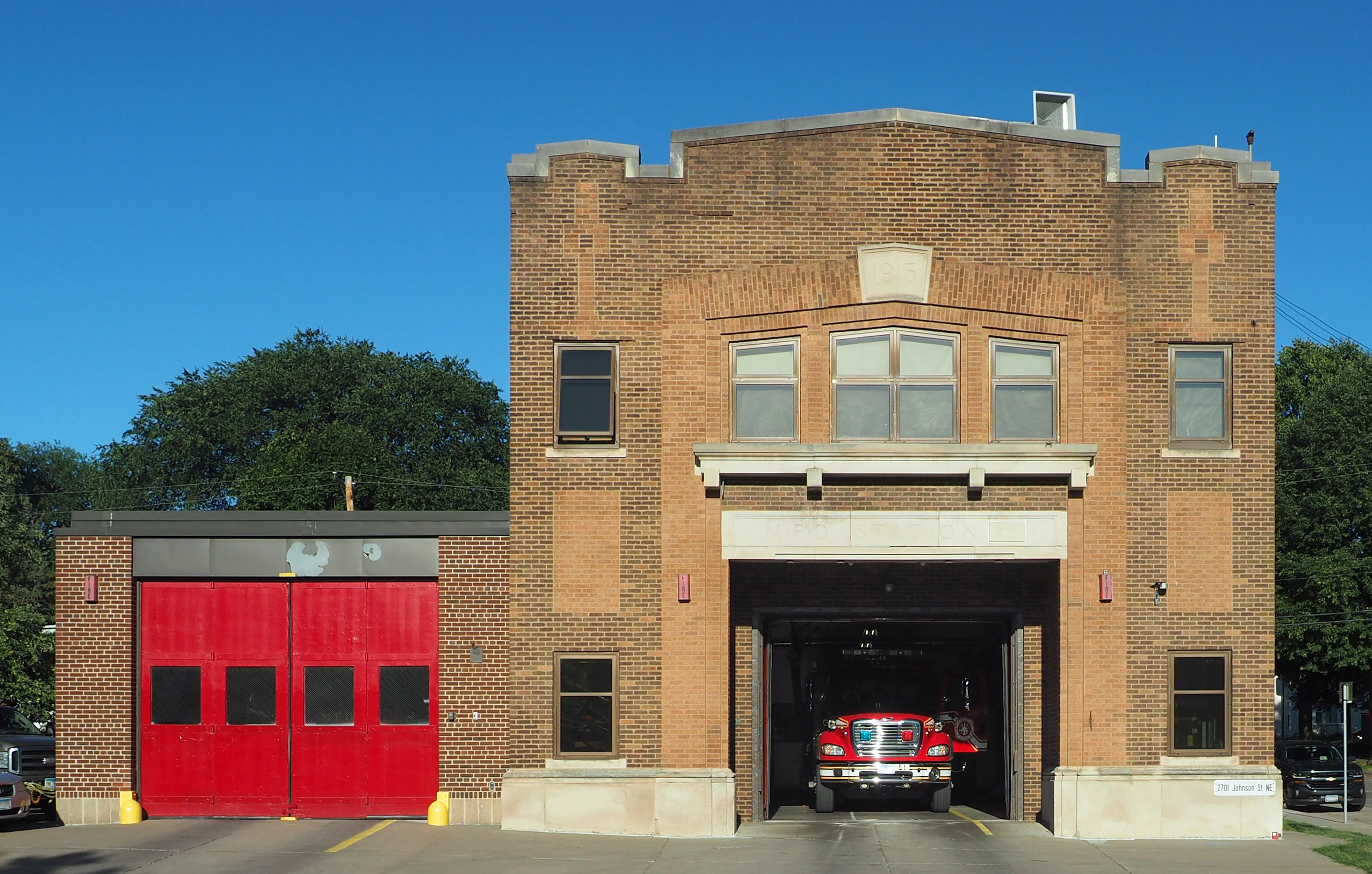
Minneapolis Fire Station 15

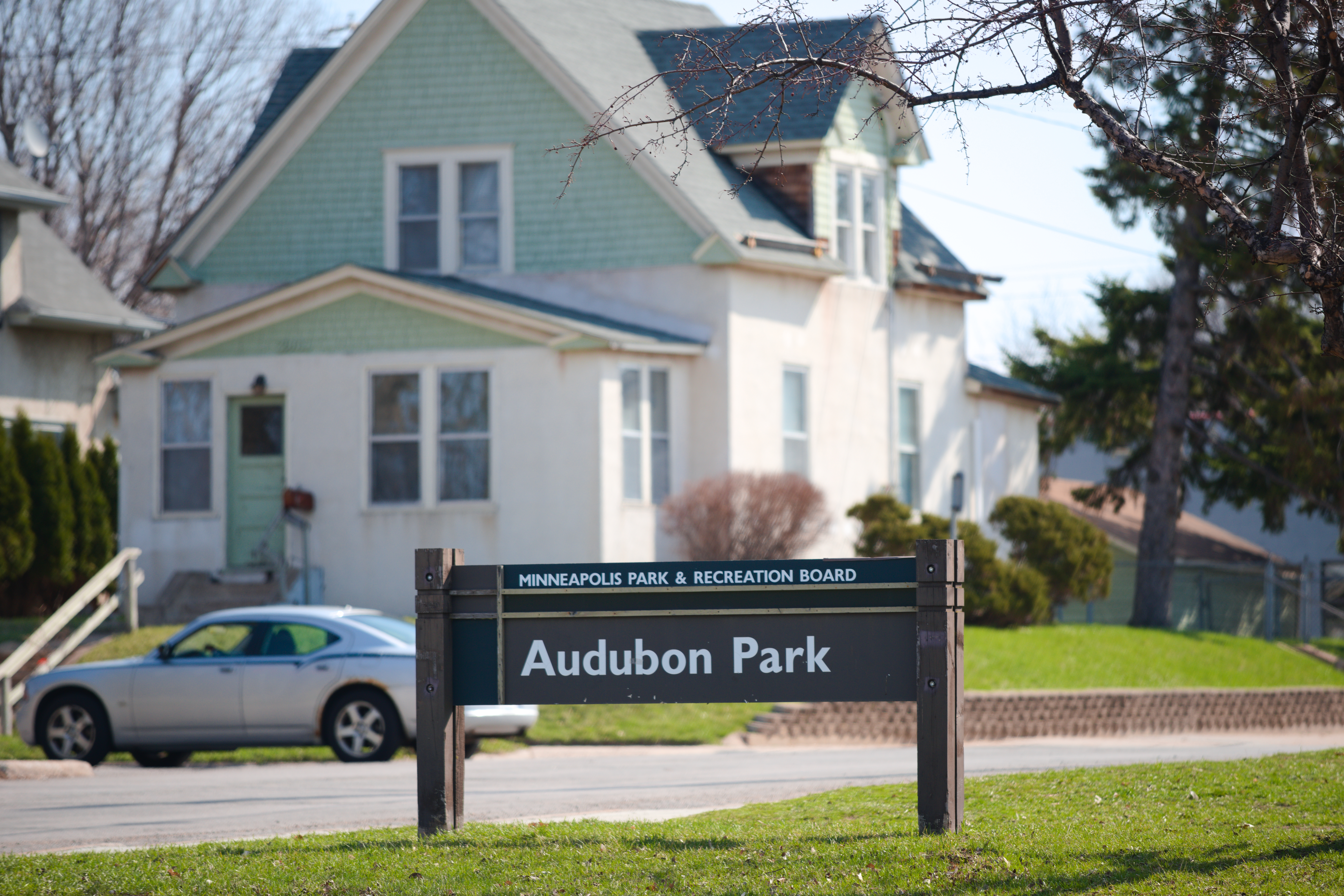
Audubon Park sign
