= St. Anthony East, Minneapolis =

Coordinates: 44.9945°N 93.2517°W

St. Anthony East
- Neighborhood
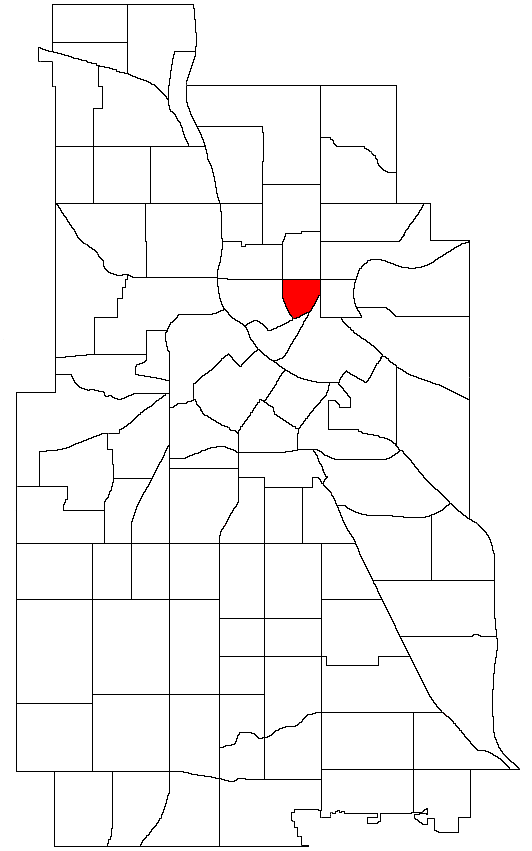
- Location of St. Anthony East within the U.S. city of Minneapolis
- Interactive map of St. Anthony East
- Country: United States
- State: Minnesota
- County: Hennepin
- City: Minneapolis
- Community: Northeast
- City Council Ward: 3

Government
  - Council Member: Michael Rainville

Area
  - Total: 0.242 sq mi (0.63 km^{2})

Population (2020)
  - Total: 2,161
  - Density: 8,930/sq mi (3,450/km^{2})
- Time zone: UTC-6 (CST)
  - Summer (DST): UTC-5 (CDT)
- ZIP code: 55413
- Area code: 612

Historical population
Census	Pop.	Note	%±
1980	1,818		—
1990	1,997		9.8%
2000	2,148		7.6%
2010	2,081		−3.1%
2020	2,161		3.8%

St. Anthony East is a neighborhood of the Northeast community in Minneapolis. It is located in Ward 3, currently represented by council member Michael Rainville.

The neighborhood's boundaries are Broadway Street NE to the north, Central Avenue to the east and southeast, 2nd Avenue to the south, 5th Street NE to the southwest, and Washington Street to the west.

== Demographics ==
Race/ethnicity
Race/ethnicity	2000		2010		2020	
Race/ethnicity	Number	%	Number	%	Number	%
White alone	1,596	75.82	1,360	66.73	1,479	68.44
Black alone	144	6.84	272	13.35	252	11.66
Hispanic or Latino (any race)	161	7.65	220	10.79	215	9.95
Native American alone	64	3.04	42	2.06	15	0.69
Asian alone	73	3.47	58	2.85	66	3.05
Other race alone	7	0.33	15	0.74	10	0.46
Pacific Islander alone	0	0.00	0	0.00	0	0.00
Two or more races	60	2.85	71	3.48	124	5.74
Total	2,105	100.0	2,038	100.0	2,161	100.0
