= Logan Park, Minneapolis =

Coordinates: 45.0028°N 93.2512°W

Logan Park
- Neighborhood
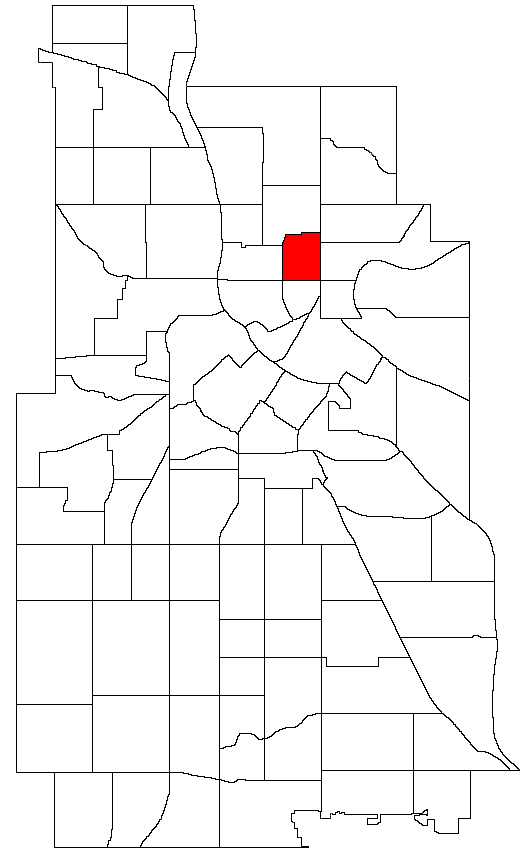
- Location of Logan Park within the U.S. city of Minneapolis
- Interactive map of Logan Park
- Country: United States
- State: Minnesota
- County: Hennepin
- City: Minneapolis
- Community: Northeast
- City Council Ward: 1

Government
  - Council Member: Elliott Payne

Area
  - Total: 0.262 sq mi (0.68 km^{2})

Population (2020)
  - Total: 2,190
  - Density: 8,360/sq mi (3,230/km^{2})
- Time zone: UTC-6 (CST)
  - Summer (DST): UTC-5 (CDT)
- ZIP code: 55413, 55418
- Area code: 612

Historical population
Census	Pop.	Note	%±
1980	2,283		—
1990	1,851		−18.9%
2000	2,222		20.0%
2010	2,179		−1.9%
2020	2,190		0.5%

Logan Park is a neighborhood in the Northeast community in Minneapolis. It is one of ten neighborhoods in Ward 1 of Minneapolis, currently represented by Council President Elliott Payne.

== Location and characteristics ==
Logan Park's boundaries are 19th Avenue NE to the north, Central Avenue to the east, Broadway Street NE to the south, and Washington Street NE to the west. It is named after Logan Park (located within its borders) which is, in turn, named after Civil War general and US Senator John A. Logan.

The neighborhood was originally settled in the late 19th century and built around Logan Park itself. Homes near the park tend to be larger and Victorian in style. The remainder of the neighborhood is smaller residential housing and industrial space with much of the industry clustered around the railroad tracks running parallel to Central Avenue. Many of the neighborhood's industrial buildings (such as the Northrup-King headquarters) have since been re-purposed as artist studios and galleries. The neighborhood is now considered part of the Northeast Minneapolis Arts District.

== Demographics ==
Race/ethnicity
Race/ethnicity	2000		2010		2020	
Race/ethnicity	Number	%	Number	%	Number	%
White alone	1,577	70.97	1,328	60.95	1,493	69.18
Black alone	202	9.09	268	12.30	302	13.99
Hispanic or Latino (any race)	197	8.87	361	16.57	179	8.29
Native American alone	68	3.06	57	2.62	25	1.16
Asian alone	64	2.88	55	2.52	46	2.13
Other race alone	5	0.23	1	0.05	6	0.28
Pacific Islander alone	1	0.05	1	0.05	0	0.00
Two or more races	108	4.86	108	4.96	107	4.96
Total	2,222	100.0	2,179	100.0	2,158	100.0

== Landmarks ==
Logan Park's central feature is the city park which shares its name. It was formerly home to Holland Elementary School which closed in 2005.

== Transportation ==
The neighborhood is served by Metro Transit bus routes 10 (Central Avenue), 17 (Washington Street) and 30 (Broadway Street). Central Avenue has dedicated bike lanes.

== Gallery ==
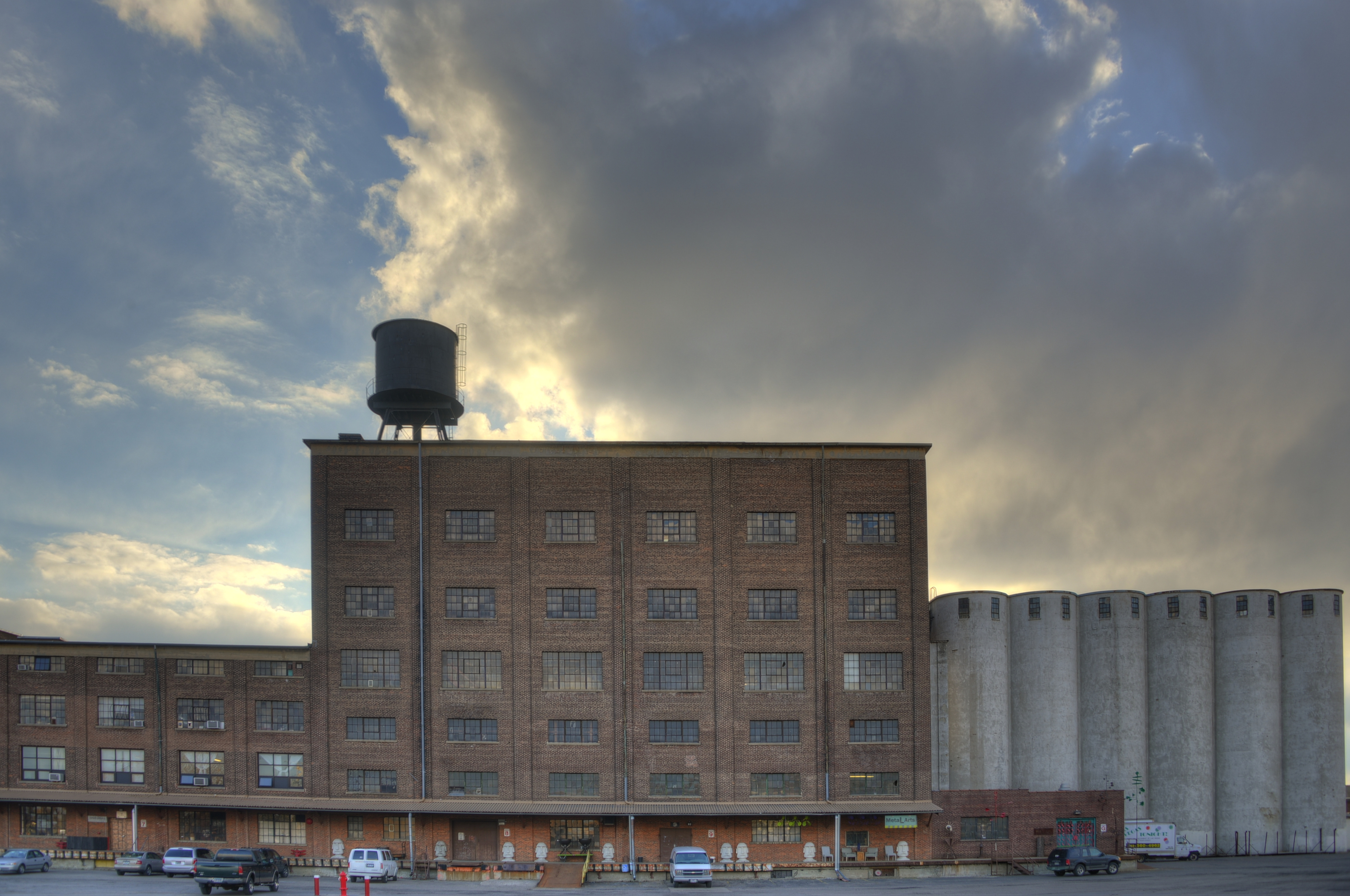
Northrup-King's former Jackson Street facility, now home to art studios and art galleries.

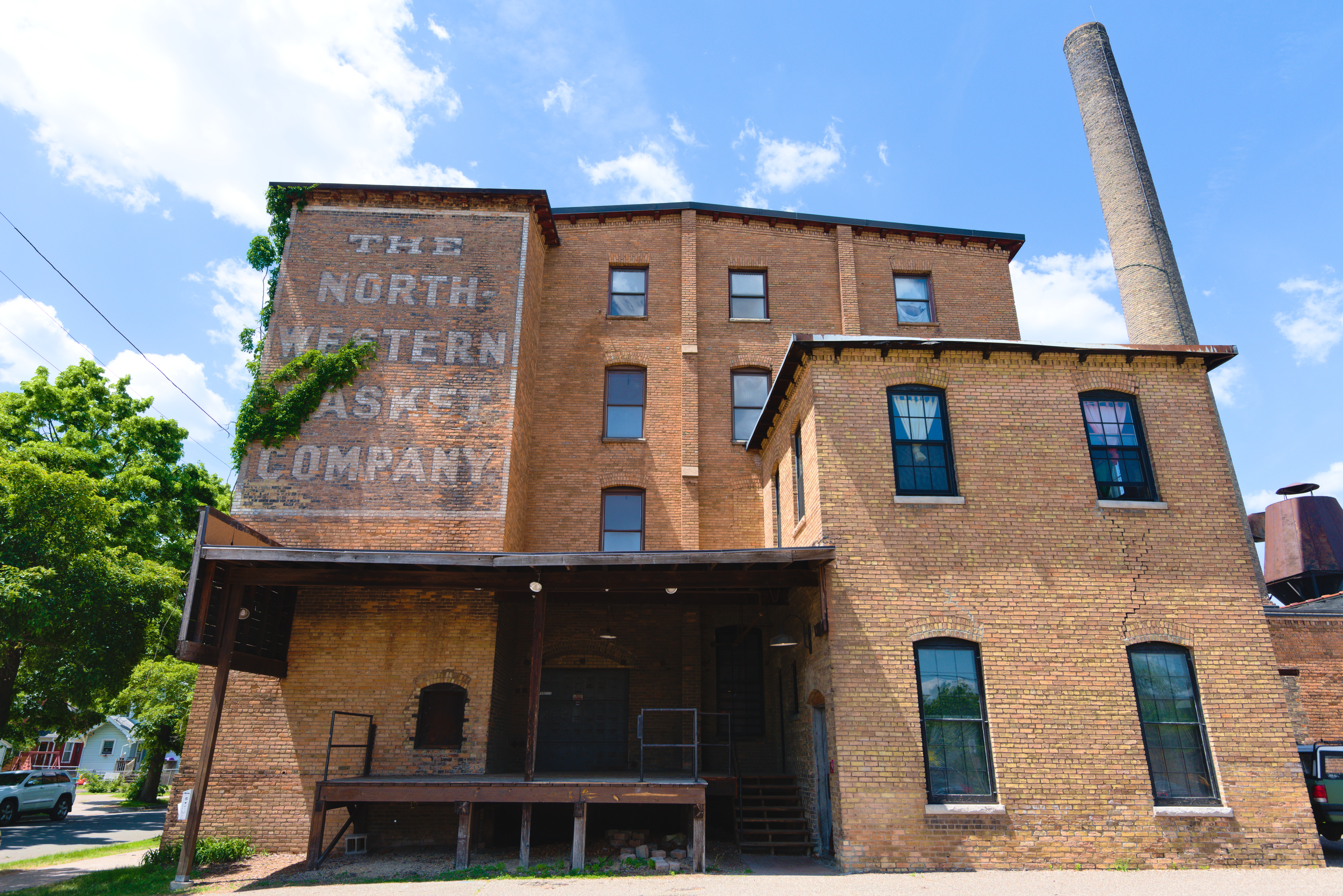
Casket Arts Building.

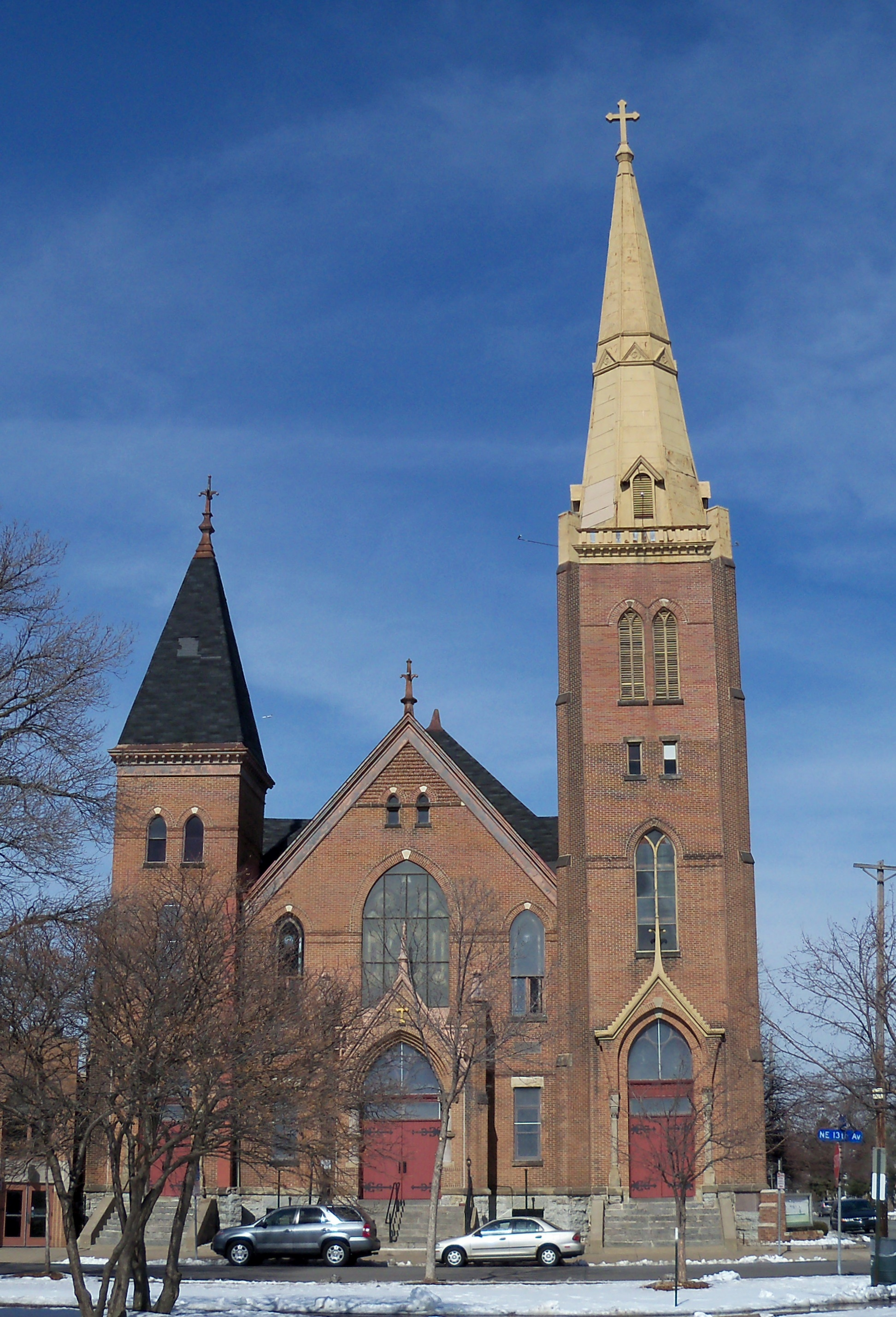
Strong Tower church, 13th Avenue Northeast and Monroe Street Northeast

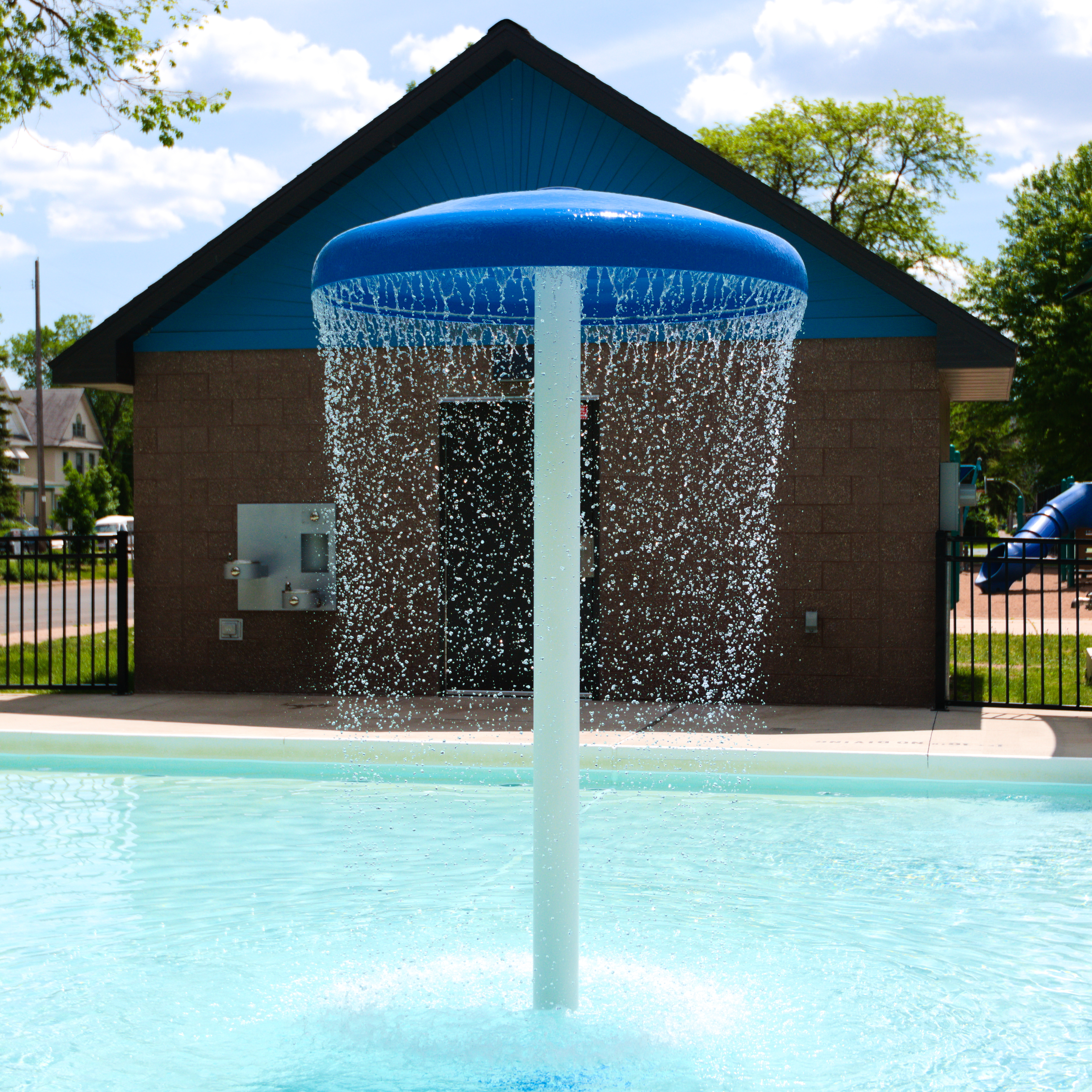
Logan Park, the neighborhood's namesake

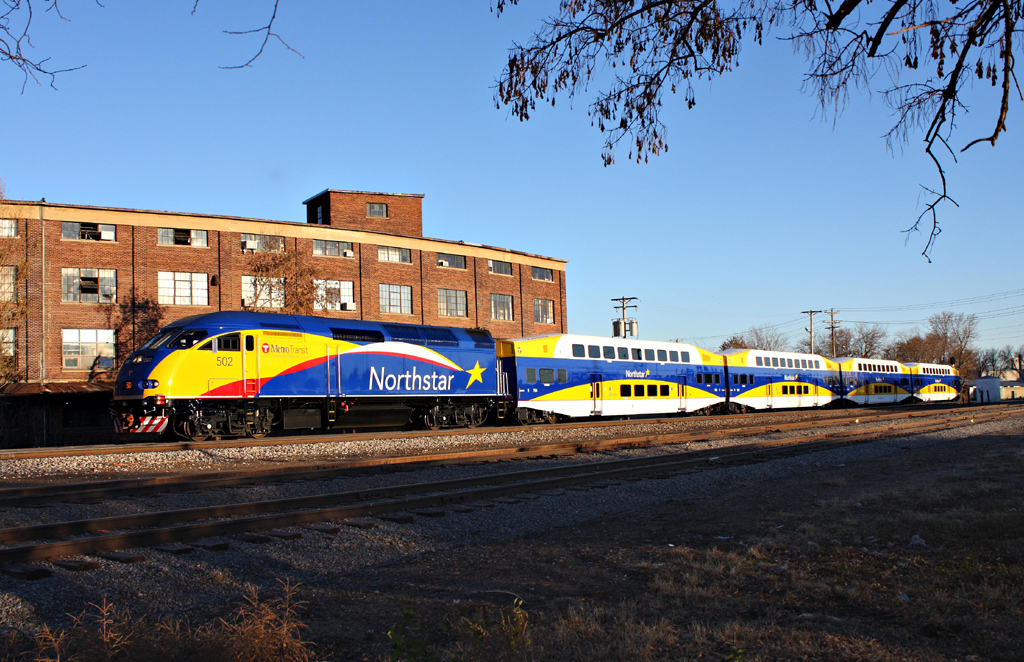
Northstar commuter train

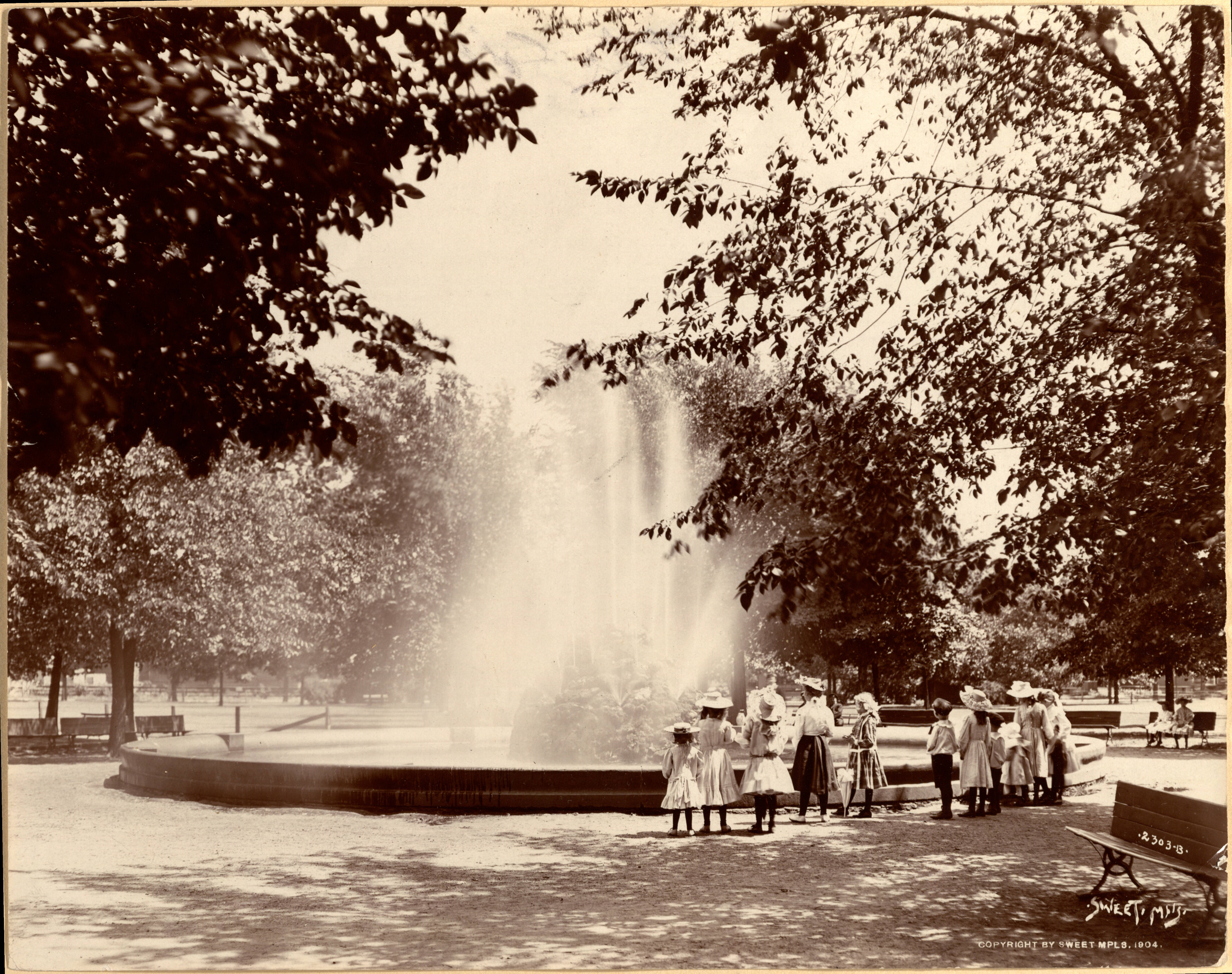
Children in Logan Park, date unknown but before 1930
