= List of neighborhoods in Minneapolis =

Minneapolis features officially defined neighborhoods that are within broader communities, as well as unofficial zones such as residential neighborhoods, commercial districts, and other geographically defined areas.

== Communities ==
This list includes the 11 communities of Minneapolis.

- Bde Maka Ska-Isles
- Camden
- Central
- Longfellow
- Near North
- Nokomis
- Northeast
- Phillips
- Powderhorn
- Southwest
- University

== Neighborhoods ==
This list includes the officially designated neighborhoods of Minneapolis.

=== A–J ===
- Armatage
- Audubon Park
- Bancroft
- Beltrami
- Bottineau
- Bryant
- Bryn Mawr
- Camden Industrial Area
- Cedar-Isles-Dean
- Cedar-Riverside
- Central
- Cleveland
- Columbia Park
- Como
- Cooper
- Corcoran
- Diamond Lake
- Downtown East
- Downtown West
- East Bde Maka Ska
- East Harriet
- East Isles
- East Phillips
- Elliot Park
- Ericsson
- Field
- Folwell
- Fulton
- Hale
- Harrison
- Hawthorne
- Hiawatha
- Holland
- Howe
- Humboldt Industrial Area
- Jordan

=== K–P ===
- Keewaydin
- Kenny
- King Field
- Kenwood
- Lind-Bohanon
- Linden Hills
- Logan Park
- Longfellow
- Loring Park
- Lowry Hill
- Lyndale
- Lynnhurst
- Marcy-Holmes
- Marshall Terrace
- McKinley
- Mid-City Industrial
- Midtown Phillips
- Minnehaha
- Morris Park
- Near North
- Nicollet Island/East Bank
- North Loop
- Northeast Park
- Northrop
- Page
- Phillips West
- Powderhorn Park
- Prospect Park

=== R–Z ===
- Regina
- Seward
- Sheridan
- Shingle Creek
- South Uptown
- St. Anthony East
- St. Anthony West
- Standish
- Stevens Square/Loring Heights
- South Uptown
- Sumner-Glenwood
- Tangletown
- University
- Ventura Village
- Victory
- Waite Park
- Webber-Camden
- The Wedge (officially Lowry Hill East)
- Wenonah
- West Maka Ska
- Whittier
- Willard Hay
- Windom
- Windom Park

== Other notable areas ==
This list includes notable permanent geographic sections in Minneapolis, such as unofficial neighborhood, commercial districts, residential areas, and other defined places. The list excludes streets, venues, transit stops, trails, government facilities, lakes, parks, and events. Segments of streets or street intersections are included in the list if the area is notable.

- Eat Street
- Dinkytown
- Downtown (officially the Central community)
- George Floyd Square
- Little Earth
- Lyn-Lake
- Midtown
- Mill District
- Nicollet Mall
- Saint Anthony Main
- Uptown
- 50th & France
- Stadium Village

== See also ==
- History of Minneapolis
