= 2023 Minneapolis City Council election =

City Council election in the city of Minneapolis

- November 7, 2023

All 13 seats on the Minneapolis City Council 7 seats needed for a majority
- Turnout: 31.7% (▼22.3pp)
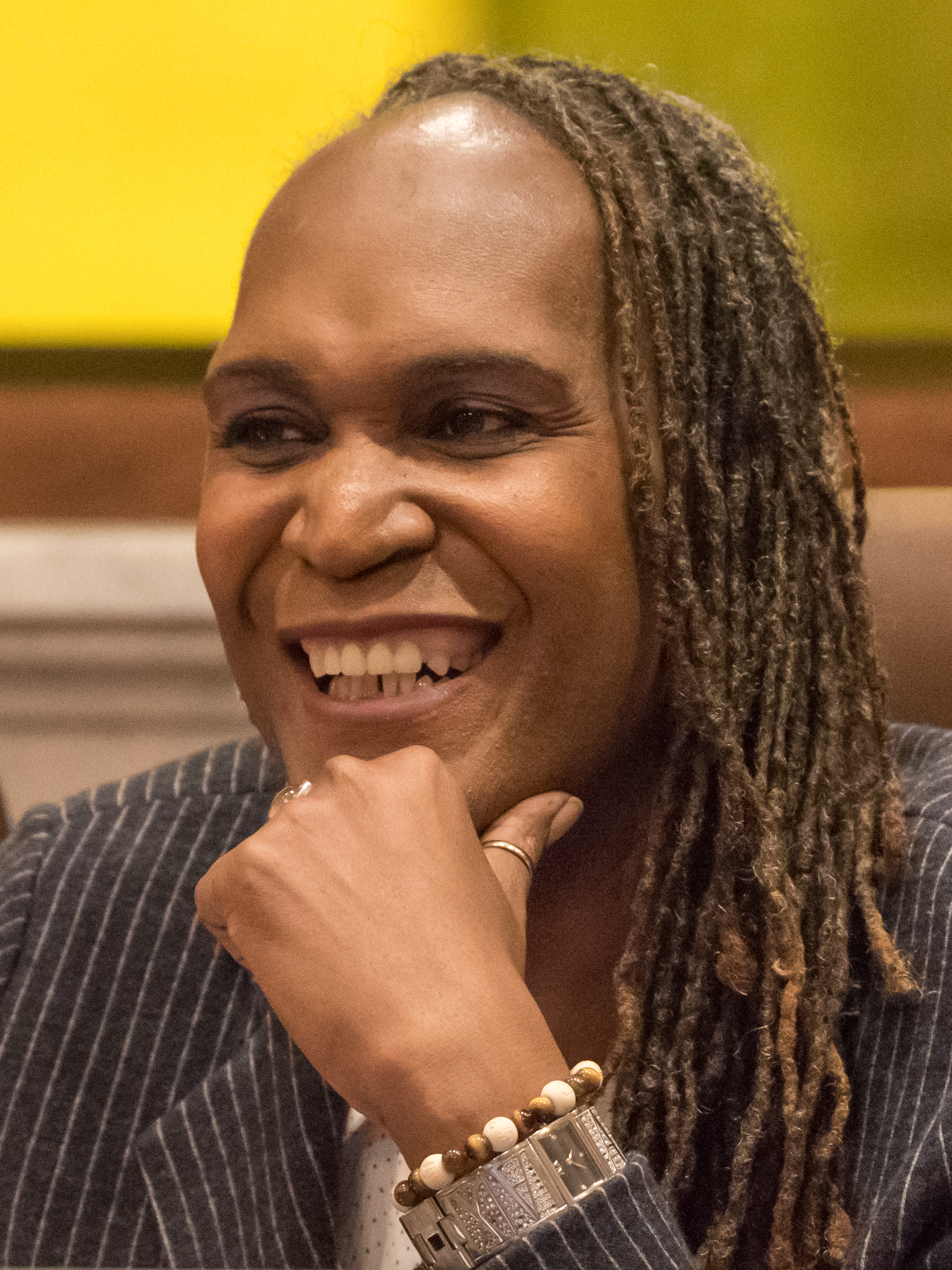

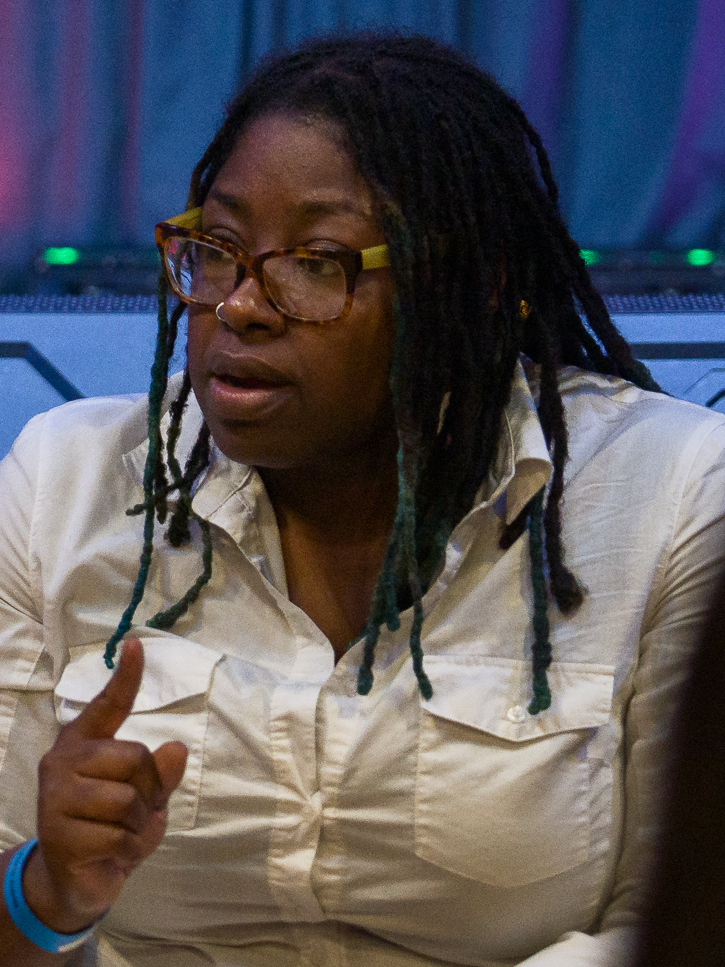
	Majority party	Minority party
Leader	Andrea Jenkins	Robin Wonsley
Party	Democratic (DFL)	Democratic Socialists (DSA)
Leader's seat	Ward 8	Ward 2
Last election	12	1
Seats won	12	1
Seat change	Steady	Steady
Popular vote	70,322	1,381
Percentage	89.3%	1.96%
Swing	▲3.35 pp	▼0.30 pp
President before election
Andrea Jenkins
Democratic (DFL)
Elected President
Elliott Payne
Democratic (DFL)

The 2023 Minneapolis City Council election took place in the city of Minneapolis, Minnesota, United States on November 7, 2023. The Minneapolis City Council is made up of 13 members, with one council member representing each of the city's 13 wards. Typically, council members serve four year terms, but due to census redistricting, the 2021 and 2023 elections were for two-year terms. The 2023 election was the first to elect members to redrawn districts and the first election since the city's form of government moved to an Executive Mayor-Legislative Council structure. The change was prompted after voters narrowly approved a ballot measure in 2021 to shift certain powers from the city council to the mayor. Topics surrounding public safety, affordable housing, rent control, and racial justice were at the forefront of the campaign.

All incumbents were re-elected. The closest race was in ward 8, where incumbent council president Andrea Jenkins defeated her challenger Soren Stevenson by just 38 votes. Despite this narrow victory, a coalition of progressive members managed to secure a majority with seven of the thirteen seats. This coalition, powered by a combination of local Democratic Socialists of America (DSA) support and the allied PAC Mpls for the Many, achieved success despite being financially outpaced by groups like All for Mpls who supported mayor Jacob Frey. Despite their majority, progressives are two votes short of overriding a veto by Frey. Discussions on rent control remain stalled, police reform is under scrutiny amidst a state consent decree, and homelessness remains a pressing concern.

== Background ==
=== Retiring members ===
- Lisa Goodman (DFL), Ward 7
- Andrew Johnson (DFL), Ward 12

=== Rent control ===
In 2021, Minneapolis voters expressed their desire for rent control measures, yet as of 2023, the city council has yet to finalize a policy. The issue hit a standstill when an advance rent control measure failed, largely due to the absence of council members during Eid al-Adha. Mayor Frey was opposed to the proposed bill, which aimed to cap rent increases at 3%.

=== Homelessness ===
Homelessness and homelessness encampments remain a concern in Minneapolis. Advocacy groups are calling for more humane policies and interventions. Activists are urging the city council to prioritize the provision of shelters, stop encampment evictions, and increase funding for homelessness resources.

=== DFL endorsement conventions ===
The Democratic-Farmer-Labor (DFL) endorsement conventions in several Minneapolis wards were marred by allegations of irregularities and chaos. The convention for Ward 5 was canceled due to allegations of fraudulent delegates, while the convention for Ward 10 descended into a melee when supporters of candidate Nasri Warsame disrupted the event. In Ward 6, candidate Kayseh Magan challenged 126 delegates supporting Tiger Worku, alleging incorrect addresses, misspelled names, and unverified signatures. Magan claimed that many of Worku's delegates did not consent to be delegates or signed up with ProtonMail email addresses. The State DFL Executive Committee met and adopted new bylaws granting the party more authority to ban individuals involved in violence and disruptive acts, and subsequently used these new rules to ban Nasri Warsame from seeking DFL endorsement. These actions were subsequently ratified by the larger State Central Committee to take full effect. DFL endorsements hold significant value in the heavily Democratic city of Minneapolis.

== Electoral system ==
The 13 members of the City Council are elected from single-member districts via instant-runoff voting, commonly known as ranked choice voting. Voters have the option of ranking up to three candidates in order of preference. Municipal elections in Minnesota are officially nonpartisan, although candidates are able to identify with a political party on the ballot. Write-in candidates must file a request with the Minneapolis Elections & Voter Services Division for votes for them to be counted.

== Summary of results ==
Party	Candidates	1st Choice Votes			Seats		
Party	Candidates	No.	%	∆pp	No.	∆No.	%
Democratic–Farmer–Labor Party (DFL)	27	70,322	89.3	+3.35	12	0	92.31
Democratic Socialists of America	1	1,381	1.96	-0.30	1	0	7.69
Republican Party	4	970	1.23	–1.48	0	0	0.00
Socialist Workers Party	2	788	1.00	+0.42	0	0	0.00
Independent	2	2,553	3.24	–1.79	0	0	0.00
Abolish Bike Lanes	1	105	0.15	+0.15	0	0	0.00
No Vax	1	39	0.06	+0.06	0	0	0.00
Write-in	N/A	1,404	1.78	+1.42	0	0	0.00
Total		70,322	100.00	±0.00	13	±0	100.00
Turnout (registered voters)		78,960	31.7	-22.3			
Source: Minneapolis Elections & Voter Services

== Ward 1 ==
The 1st ward is based in northeast Minneapolis, stretching from the neighborhoods of Waite Park and Columbia Park down to Como. The incumbent is Democrat Elliott Payne, who was elected with 52.5% of the vote in 2021. Payne ran for re-election.

=== Candidates ===
- Elliott Payne (DFL), incumbent council member
- Edwin Fruit (Socialist Workers)

=== Endorsements ===
Elliott Payne

Political parties

- Minneapolis DFL

Federal officials

- Ilhan Omar, U.S. representative for Minnesota's 5th congressional district

Statewide officials

- Keith Ellison, Minnesota Attorney General

State legislators

- Sydney Jordan, state representative

County officials

- Irene Fernando, chair of the Hennepin County commission

Local officials

- Ira Jourdain, member of the Minneapolis Board of Education

Labor unions

- LiUNA Minnesota & North Dakota
- Minneapolis Federation of Teachers (AFT Local 59)
- Service Employees International Union Minnesota State Council

Organizations

- Minnesota DFL LGBTQ Caucus
- Our Revolution Twin Cities
- OutFront Minnesota

=== Results ===
Results by precinct: Payne: 80–90%; >90%

Ward 1 results
Party	Candidate	Round 1	
Party	Candidate	Votes	%
Democratic (DFL)	Elliott Payne (incumbent)	4,017	89.71%
Socialist Workers	Edwin Fruit	328	7.32%
Write-in	Write-ins	133	2.97%
Total active votes		4,478	100.00%
Source: Minneapolis Elections & Voter Services

== Ward 2 ==
The 2nd ward contains the neighborhoods of Cooper, Prospect Park, and University District, as well as portions of Seward and Cedar-Riverside. The incumbent is independent (Note: Wonsley uses "Democratic Socialists of America" on her ballot line, but DSA is not a political party and Wonsley herself is an independent.) Robin Wonsley, who was elected with 50.1% of the vote in 2021. Wonsley ran for re-election.

=== Candidates ===
- Robin Wonsley (DSA), incumbent council member
- Michael Baskins (Independent, declared write-in)

=== Endorsements ===
Robin Wonsley

Federal officials

- Ilhan Omar, U.S. representative for Minnesota's 5th congressional district

State legislators

- Esther Agbaje, state representative
- Cedrick Frazier, state representative
- Aisha Gomez, state representative
- Athena Hollins, state representative
- Kate Knuth, former state representative and runner-up for mayor in 2021
- Fue Lee, state representative
- Zaynab Mohamed, state senator
- Mohamud Noor, state representative
- Samantha Sencer-Mura, state representative

County officials

- Angela Conley, Hennepin County commissioner

Local officials

- Becky Alper, Minneapolis Park and Recreation Board commissioner
- Jeremiah Ellison, Minneapolis city council member
- Samantha Pree-Stinson, member of the Minneapolis Board of Estimate and Taxation

Individuals

- Sheila Nezhad, community organizer and candidate for mayor in 2021
- Randy Bryce, ironworker

Labor unions

- LiUNA Minnesota & North Dakota
- Minneapolis Federation of Teachers (AFT Local 59)
- Service Employees International Union Minnesota State Council

Organizations

- OutFront Minnesota
- Our Revolution Twin Cities
- Twin Cities Democratic Socialists of America
- UMN Democratic Socialists of America
Declined to endorse

Political parties

- Minneapolis DFL

=== Results ===
Results by precinct: Wonsley: 50–60%; 60–70%; 70–80%; >90%

Ward 2 results
Party	Candidate	Round 1	
Party	Candidate	Votes	%
Democratic Socialist (DSA)	Robin Wonsley (incumbent)	1,381	67.63%
Write-in	Michael Baskins	484	23.70%
Write-in	Undeclared write-ins	177	8.67%
Total active votes		2,042	100.00%
Source: Minneapolis Elections & Voter Services

== Ward 3 ==
The 3rd ward contains the neighborhoods of Marcy-Holmes and St. Anthony as well as Nicollet Island and Downtown Minneapolis. The incumbent is Democrat Michael Rainville, who was elected with 55.0% of the vote in 2021. Rainville ran for re-election.

=== Candidates ===
- Marcus Mills (Independent), community organizer
- Michael Rainville (DFL), incumbent council member

==== Withdrawn ====
- Conrad Zbikowski (DFL), political consultant

=== DFL endorsement ===
DFL endorsement vote results (60% required)
Candidate	Votes	%
Michael Rainville (incumbent)	216	72.00
Conrad Zbikowski	55	18.33
Marcus Mills	29	9.67
Total votes	300	100.00

=== Endorsements ===
Marcus Mills

Political parties

- Fifth Congressional District Green Party

Local officials

- Jeremy Schroeder, former Minneapolis city council member

Individuals

- Sheila Nezhad, community organizer and candidate for mayor in 2021

Organizations

- Our Revolution Twin Cities (co-endorsement with Zbikowski)
Michael Rainville

Political parties

- Minneapolis DFL

Statewide officials

- Keith Ellison, Minnesota Attorney General

Local officials

- Sharon Sayles Belton, former mayor of Minneapolis
- Don Samuels, former Minneapolis city council member

Labor unions

- LiUNA Minnesota & North Dakota
- Minneapolis Firefighters (IAFF Local 82)

Organizations

- Minnesota DFL Senior Caucus
Conrad Zbikowski (withdrawn)

State legislators

- Esther Agbaje, state representative

County officials

- Irene Fernando, chair of the Hennepin County commission

Local officials

- Becky Alper, Minneapolis Park and Recreation Board commissioner

Organizations

- Minnesota DFL LGBTQ Caucus
- OutFront Minnesota
- Our Revolution Twin Cities (co-endorsement with Mills)

=== Results ===
Results by precinct: Rainville: 50–60%; 60–70%; 70–80%; 80-90%; Mills: 40–50%; 50–60%

Ward 3 results
Party	Candidate	Round 1	
Party	Candidate	Votes	%
Democratic (DFL)	Michael Rainville (incumbent)	3,945	69.45%
Independent	Marcus Mills	1,665	29.31%
Write-in	Write-ins	70	1.23%
Total active votes		5,680	100.00%
Source: Minneapolis Elections & Voter Services

== Ward 4 ==
The 4th ward contains the neighborhoods of Jordan and Victory. The incumbent is Democrat LaTrisha Vetaw, who was elected with 60.6% of the vote in 2021. Vetaw ran for re-election.

=== Candidates ===
- Leslie Davis (No Vax)
- Marvina Haynes (DFL), nursing assistant and small business owner
- LaTrisha Vetaw (DFL), incumbent council member
- Angela Williams (R)

=== DFL endorsement ===
DFL endorsement vote results (60% required)
Candidate	Votes	%
LaTrisha Vetaw (incumbent)	63	85.14
Marvina Haynes	8	10.81
No endorsement	3	4.05
Total votes	74	100.00

=== Endorsements ===
LaTrisha Vetaw

Political parties

- Minneapolis DFL

Labor unions

- LiUNA Minnesota & North Dakota

Organizations

- Minnesota DFL Senior Caucus
Declined to endorse

Organizations

- Minnesota DFL LGBTQ Caucus

=== Results ===
Results by precinct: Vetaw: 60–70%; 70–80%; >90%

Ward 4 results
Party	Candidate	Round 1	
Party	Candidate	Votes	%
Democratic (DFL)	LaTrisha Vetaw (incumbent)	2,370	69.36%
Democratic (DFL)	Marvina Haynes	640	18.73%
Republican	Angela Williams	328	9.60%
No Vax	Leslie Davis	39	1.14%
Write-in	Write-ins	40	1.17%
Total active votes		3,417	100.00%
Source: Minneapolis Elections & Voter Services

== Ward 5 ==
The 5th ward contains the neighborhoods of Harrison, Near North, Hawthorne, and North Loop. The incumbent is Democrat Jeremiah Ellison, who was re-elected with 51.1% of the vote in 2021. Ellison ran for re-election.

=== Candidates ===
- Jeremiah Ellison (DFL), incumbent council member
- Victor Martinez (DFL), pastor and candidate for this ward in 2021
- Phillip "OMac" Peterson (DFL)

=== Endorsements ===
Jeremiah Ellison

Labor unions

- Minneapolis Federation of Teachers (AFT Local 59)
- Service Employees International Union Minnesota State Council

Organizations

- Our Revolution Twin Cities
- Minnesota DFL LGBTQ Caucus
Declined to endorse

Political parties

- Minneapolis DFL

=== Results ===
Results by precinct: Ellison: 40–50%; 50–60%; 60–70%; Martinez: 40–50%

Ward 5 results
Party	Candidate	Round 1	
Party	Candidate	Votes	%
Democratic (DFL)	Jeremiah Ellison (incumbent)	1,665	52.54%
Democratic (DFL)	Victor Martinez	1,296	40.90%
Democratic (DFL)	Phillip Peterson	112	3.53%
Write-in	Write-ins	96	3.03%
Total active votes		3,169	100.00%
Source: Minneapolis Elections & Voter Services

== Ward 6 ==
The 6th ward contains the neighborhoods of Philips West, and Ventura Village, as well as portions of Seward, Stevens Square-Loring Heights, Cedar-Riverside, and Elliot Park. The incumbent is Democrat Jamal Osman, who was re-elected with 59.4% of the vote in 2021. Osman ran for re-election.

=== Candidates ===
- Tiger Worku (DFL), author, former president of the Seward Neighborhood Group
- Kayseh Magan (DFL), former investigator in the Minnesota Attorney General's office and former member of the Minneapolis Civil Rights Commission
- Jamal Osman (DFL), incumbent council member
- Guy Gaskin (R)

==== Withdrawn ====
- Abdirizak Bihi (DFL), KFAI radio host and candidate for this ward in 2020 and 2021

=== Endorsements ===
Tiger Worku

Elected Officials

- John Hoffman, Minnesota state senator
- Nelsie Yang, Saint Paul city councilor
- Samantha Pree-Stinson, Minneapolis President, Board of Estimate and Taxation
- Alicia D. Smith, Minneapolis Vice-President of Park Board

Organizations

- Sunrise Movement
Kayseh Magan

Organizations

- Minnesota DFL LGBTQ Caucus
- Minnesota DFL Senior Caucus
- College Democrats of Minnesota
- Minneapolis Firefighters (IAFF Local 82)
- Star Tribune Editorial Board
- Moms Demand Action
- Southside Pride
- Wedge Live
- Collective PAC
- North Central States Regional Council of Carpenters

=== Results ===
Results by precinct: Osman: 30–40%; 40–50%; 50–60%; Magan: 40–50%; 50–60%

Ward 6 results
Party	Candidate	Round 1		Round 2		
Party	Candidate	Votes	%	Transfer	Votes	%
Democratic (DFL)	Jamal Osman (incumbent)	2,317	44.73%	+183	2,500	58.18%
Democratic (DFL)	Kayseh Magan	1,553	29.98%	+244	1,797	41.81%
Democratic (DFL)	Tiger Worku	1,127	21.76%	-1,120	Eliminated	
Republican	Guy Gaskin	174	3.36%	-174	Eliminated	
Write-in	Write-ins	9	0.17%	-9	Eliminated	
Total active votes		5,180	100.00%	-883	4,297	100.00%
Source: Minneapolis Elections & Voter Services

== Ward 7 ==
The 7th ward contains the neighborhoods of Bryn Mawr, Cedar-Isles-Dean, Downtown West, East Isles, Kenwood, Loring Park, and Lowry Hill, as well as portions of Stevens Square-Loring Heights and Elliot Park. The incumbent is Democrat Lisa Goodman, who was re-elected with 61.9% of the vote in 2021. Goodman did not seek re-election.

=== Candidates ===
- Katie Cashman (DFL), environmental lobbyist
- Kenneth Foxworth (DFL), educator and former Democratic National Committee member
- Scott Graham (DFL), real estate broker and 5th CD chair for the Minnesota DFL

==== Withdrawn ====
- Mark Globus (DFL), attorney and candidate for mayor in 2021

=== DFL endorsement ===
DFL endorsement vote results (60% required)
Candidate	Round 1		Round 2		Result
Candidate	Votes	%	Votes	%	Result
Scott Graham	159	52.13	155	52.54	Adjourned (No endorsement)
Katie Cashman	132	43.28	129	43.73	Adjourned (No endorsement)
No endorsement	4	1.31	11	3.73	Adjourned (No endorsement)
Mark Globus	7	2.30	0	0.00	Adjourned (No endorsement)
Kenneth Foxworth	3	0.98	0	0.00	Adjourned (No endorsement)
Total votes	305	100.00	295	100.00	Adjourned (No endorsement)

=== Endorsements ===
Katie Cashman

State legislators

- Patricia Torres Ray, former state senator

Organizations

- Minnesota DFL LGBTQ Caucus
- Our Revolution Twin Cities
- OutFront Minnesota
Scott Graham

Individuals

- Mike Erlandson, former chair of the Minnesota DFL

Organizations

- Minnesota DFL Senior Caucus
Declined to endorse

Political parties

- Minneapolis DFL

=== Results ===
Results by precinct: Cashman: 40–50%; 50–60%; 60–70%; 70–80%; Graham: 50–60%; 60–70%

Ward 7 results
Party	Candidate	Round 1		Round 2		
Party	Candidate	Votes	%	Transfer	Votes	%
Democratic (DFL)	Katie Cashman	3,867	48.41%	+138	4,055	51.12%
Democratic (DFL)	Scott Graham	3,808	47.67%	+70	3,878	48.88%
Democratic (DFL)	Kenneth Foxworth	290	3.63%	-289	Eliminated	
Write-in	Write-ins	23	0.29%	-23	Eliminated	
Total active votes		7,988	100.00%	-55	7,933	100.00%
Source: Minneapolis Elections & Voter Services

== Ward 8 ==
The 8th ward contains the neighborhoods of Kingfield, Lyndale, Northrop, and Regina. The incumbent is Democrat Andrea Jenkins, the current council president, who was re-elected with 84.9% of the vote in 2021. Jenkins ran for re-election.

=== Candidates ===
- Andrea Jenkins (DFL), incumbent council member and council president
- Soren Stevenson (DFL), policy advocate
- Bob Sullentrop (R)
- Terry White (DFL)

=== DFL endorsement ===
DFL endorsement vote results (60% required)
Candidate	Votes	%
Soren Stevenson	202	67.55
Andrea Jenkins (incumbent)	88	29.43
No endorsement	9	3.0
Total votes	299	100.00

=== Endorsements ===
Andrea Jenkins

Federal officials

- Ilhan Omar, U.S. representative for Minnesota's 5th congressional district

Statewide officials

- Keith Ellison, Minnesota Attorney General

Local officials

- Ira Jourdain, member of the Minneapolis Board of Education

Labor unions

- Service Employees International Union Minnesota State Council

Organizations

- LPAC
- ~~Minnesota DFL Senior Caucus~~ (withdrawn after DFL convention due to party rules)
- OutFront Minnesota
- Victory Fund
Soren Stevenson

Political parties

- Minneapolis DFL

Local officials

- Robin Wonsley, Minneapolis city council member (DSA)

Labor unions

- Minneapolis Federation of Teachers (AFT Local 59)

Organizations

- Twin Cities Democratic Socialists of America
- Our Revolution Twin Cities
Declined to endorse

Organizations

- Minnesota DFL LGBTQ Caucus

=== Results ===
Results by precinct: Jenkins: 40–50%; 50–60%; Stevenson: 40–50%; 50–60%

Ward 8 results
Party	Candidate	Round 1		Round 2		
Party	Candidate	Votes	%	Transfer	Votes	%
Democratic (DFL)	Andrea Jenkins (incumbent)	3,491	43.32%	+403	3,894	50.24%
Democratic (DFL)	Soren Stevenson	3,597	44.63%	+259	3,856	49.76%
Democratic (DFL)	Terry White	544	6.75%	-544	Eliminated	
Republican	Bob Sullentrop	418	5.19%	-418	Eliminated	
Write-in	Write-ins	9	0.11%	-9	Eliminated	
Total active votes		8,059	100.00%	-359	7,750	100.00%
Source: Minneapolis Elections & Voter Services

== Ward 9 ==
The 9th ward contains the neighborhoods of Corcoran, East Phillips, Longfellow, Midtown Phillips, and Powderhorn Park. The incumbent is Democrat Jason Chavez, who was elected with 56.9% of the vote in 2021. Chavez ran for re-election.

=== Candidates ===
- Jason Chavez (DFL), incumbent council member
- Daniel Orban (Independent)

=== Endorsements ===
Jason Chavez

Political parties

- Minneapolis DFL

Federal officials

- Ilhan Omar, U.S. representative for Minnesota's 5th congressional district

Statewide officials

- Keith Ellison, Minnesota Attorney General

State legislators

- Omar Fateh, state senator
- Aisha Gomez, state representative
- Mohamud Noor, state representative
- Samantha Sencer-Mura, state representative

County officials

- Angela Conley, Hennepin County commissioner

Local officials

- Becky Alper, Minneapolis Park and Recreation Board commissioner
- Collin Beachy, member of the Minneapolis Board of Education
- Lori Novell, member of the Minneapolis Board of Education

Labor unions

- LiUNA Minnesota & North Dakota
- Minnesota Federation of Teachers (AFT Local 59)
- Service Employees International Union Minnesota State Council

Organizations

- Twin Cities Democratic Socialists of America
- Minnesota DFL LGBTQ Caucus
- Our Revolution Twin Cities
- OutFront Minnesota
- Run for Something
- Victory Fund

=== Results ===
Results by precinct: Chavez: 50-60%; 70-80%; 80–90%

Ward 9 results
Party	Candidate	Round 1	
Party	Candidate	Votes	%
Democratic (DFL)	Jason Chavez (incumbent)	3,407	78.94%
Independent	Daniel Orban	888	20.41%
Write-in	Write-ins	21	0.65%
Total active votes		4,316	100.00%
Source: Minneapolis Elections & Voter Services

== Ward 10 ==
The 10th ward contains the neighborhoods of East Bde Maka Ska, Lowry Hill East, South Uptown, and Whittier, as well as a portion of East Harriet. The incumbent is Democrat Aisha Chughtai, who was elected with 60.0% of the vote in 2021. Chughtai ran for re-election.

=== Candidates ===
- Aisha Chughtai (DFL), incumbent council member
- Bruce Dachis (DFL), businessman
- Greg Kline (Abolish Bike Lanes)
- Nasri Warsame (DFL)

=== DFL endorsement ===
DFL endorsement vote results (60% required)
Candidate	Votes	%
Aisha Chughtai	181	69.35
No endorsement	79	30.27
Abstain	1	0.38
Total votes	261	100.00

=== Endorsements ===
Aisha Chughtai

Political parties

- Minneapolis DFL

State legislators

- Aisha Gomez, state representative
- Frank Hornstein, state representative

County officials

- Angela Conley, Hennepin County commissioner
- Irene Fernando, chair of the Hennepin County commission

Labor unions

- LiUNA Minnesota & North Dakota
- Minneapolis Federation of Teachers (AFT Local 59)
- Service Employees International Union Minnesota State Council

Organizations

- Twin Cities Democratic Socialists of America
- Our Revolution Twin Cities

=== Results ===
Results by precinct: Chughtai: 50-60%; 60–70%; 70-80%; Dachis: 50-60%; Warsame: 50-60%

Ward 10 results
Party	Candidate	Round 1	
Party	Candidate	Votes	%
Democratic (DFL)	Aisha Chughtai (incumbent)	3,828	60.74%
Democratic (DFL)	Bruce Dachis	1,713	27.18%
Democratic (DFL)	Nasri Warsame	638	10.12%
Abolish Bike Lanes	Greg Kline	105	1.67%
Write-in	Write-ins	18	0.29%
Total active votes		6,302	100.00%
Source: Minneapolis Elections & Voter Services

== Ward 11 ==
The 11th ward contains the neighborhoods of Diamond Lake, Hale, Page, Northrop, Tangletown, Wenonah, and Windom, as well as a portion of Keewaydin. The incumbent is Democrat Emily Koski, who was elected with 58.3% of the vote in 2021. Koski ran for re-election.

=== Candidates ===
- Emily Koski (DFL), incumbent council member
- Gabrielle Prosser (Socialist Workers)

==== Withdrawn ====
- Rebecca Donley (DFL), domestic violence counselor and community activist

=== DFL endorsement ===
DFL endorsement vote results (60% required)
Candidate	Votes	%
Emily Koski (incumbent)	183	85.51
Rebecca Donley	29	13.55
No endorsement	2	0.93
Total votes	214	100.00

=== Endorsements ===
Emily Koski

Political parties

- Minneapolis DFL

Labor unions

- LiUNA Minnesota & North Dakota

Organizations

- Minnesota DFL Senior Caucus
Declined to endorse

Organizations

- Minnesota DFL LGBTQ Caucus

=== Results ===
Results by precinct: Koski: 80–90%; >90%

Ward 11 results
Party	Candidate	Round 1	
Party	Candidate	Votes	%
Democratic (DFL)	Emily Koski (incumbent)	5,259	88.36%
Socialist Workers	Gabrielle Prosser	460	7.73%
Write-in	Write-ins	233	3.91%
Total active votes		5,952	100.00%
Source: Minneapolis Elections & Voter Services

== Ward 12 ==
The 12th ward contains the neighborhoods of Cooper, Ericsson, Hiawatha, Howe, Minnehaha, Morris Park, and Standish, as well as a portion of Keewaydin. The incumbent is Democrat Andrew Johnson, who was re-elected with 64.8% of the vote in 2021. Johnson did not seek re-election.

=== Candidates ===
- Aurin Chowdhury (DSA/DFL), senior aide to council member Jason Chavez
- Nancy Ford (DFL), clothing repair business owner and independent candidate for this ward in 2021
- Luther Ranheim (DFL), nonprofit and community foundation fundraising professional

==== Withdrawn ====
- Jerome Evans (DFL), public access TV host

=== DFL endorsement ===
DFL endorsement vote results (60% required)
Candidate	Votes	%
Aurin Chowdhury	183	63.99
Luther Ranheim	73	25.52
Jerome Evans	18	6.29
Nancy Ford	12	4.20
Total votes	286	100.00

=== Endorsements ===
Aurin Chowdhury

Political parties

- Twin Cities Democratic Socialists of America
- Minneapolis DFL

Statewide officials

- Keith Ellison, Minnesota Attorney General

State legislators

- Aisha Gomez, state representative
- Frank Hornstein, state representative
- Jamie Long, state representative
- Zaynab Mohamed, state senator
- Patricia Torres Ray, former state senator
- Samantha Sencer-Mura, state representative

County officials

- Angela Conley, Hennepin County commissioner

Local officials

- Collin Beachy, member of the Minneapolis Board of Education
- Lori Novell, member of the Minneapolis Board of Education

Labor unions

- Minneapolis Federation of Teachers (AFT Local 59)
- Service Employees International Union Minnesota State Council

Organizations

- Minnesota DFL LGBTQ Caucus
- Minnesota Young DFL
- Our Revolution Twin Cities
- OutFront Minnesota
- Run for Something
- Sunrise Movement Twin Cities
Jerome Evans (withdrawn)

Organizations

- ~~Minnesota DFL Senior Caucus (co-endorsement with Ranheim)~~ (withdrawn after DFL caucus due to party rules)
Luther Ranheim

Local Elected Officials

- Meg Forney, President of the Minneapolis Park and Recreation Board
- Cathy Abene, District 6 commissioner of the Minneapolis Park and Recreation Board

Labor unions

- AFSCME Council 5
- International Brotherhood of Teamsters Joint Council 32
- International Association of Fire Fighters Local 82, Minneapolis Fire Fighters
- International Union of Operating Engineers Local 49
- North Central States Regional Council of Carpenters

Organizations

- ~~Minnesota DFL Senior Caucus (co-endorsement with Evans)~~ (withdrawn after DFL caucus due to party rules)
- OutFront Minnesota
- Engage Minneapolis

=== Results ===
Results by precinct: Chowdhury: 40–50%; 50–60%; 60–70%

Ward 12 results
Party	Candidate	Round 1	
Party	Candidate	Votes	%
Democratic (DFL)	Aurin Chowdhury	6,525	53.75%
Democratic (DFL)	Luther Ranheim	4,431	36.50%
Democratic (DFL)	Nancy Ford	1,161	9.56%
Write-in	Write-ins	22	0.58%
Total active votes		12,139	100.00%
Source: Minneapolis Elections & Voter Services

== Ward 13 ==
The 13th ward contains the neighborhoods of Armatage, Fulton, Kenny, Linden Hills, Lynnhurst, and West Maka Ska, as well as a portion of East Harriet. The incumbent is Democrat Linea Palmisano, who was re-elected with 66.2% of the vote in 2021. Palmisano ran for re-election.

=== Candidates ===
- Bob "Again" Carney (R), consultant and perennial candidate
- Zach Metzger (DFL), activist
- Kate Mortenson (DFL), education company founder
- Linea Palmisano (DFL), incumbent council member

=== DFL endorsement ===
DFL endorsement vote results (60% required)
Candidate	Votes	%
Linea Palmisano (incumbent)	142	73.58
No endorsement	46	23.83
Kate Mortenson	5	2.59
Total votes	193	100.00

=== Endorsements ===
Linea Palmisano

Political parties

- Minneapolis DFL

State legislators

- Jamie Long, state representative

Labor unions

- American Federation of State, County, and Municipal Employees Council 5
- LiUNA Minnesota & North Dakota
- Minneapolis Firefighters (IAFF Local 82)

Organizations

- Minnesota DFL Senior Caucus
Declined to endorse

Organizations

- Minnesota DFL LGBTQ Caucus

=== Results ===
Results by precinct: Palmisano: 50–60%; 60–70%; 70–80%

Ward 13 results
Party	Candidate	Round 1	
Party	Candidate	Votes	%
Democratic (DFL)	Linea Palmisano (incumbent)	6,563	65.54%
Democratic (DFL)	Kate Mortenson	2,387	23.84%
Democratic (DFL)	Zach Metzger	771	7.70%
Republican	Bob "Again" Carney	224	2.24%
Write-in	Write-ins	69	0.69%
Total active votes		10,014	100.00%
Source: Minneapolis Elections & Voter Services
