= Nokomis, Minneapolis =

Community of Minneapolis

Coordinates: 44.9072°N 93.2480°W

Nokomis
- Community
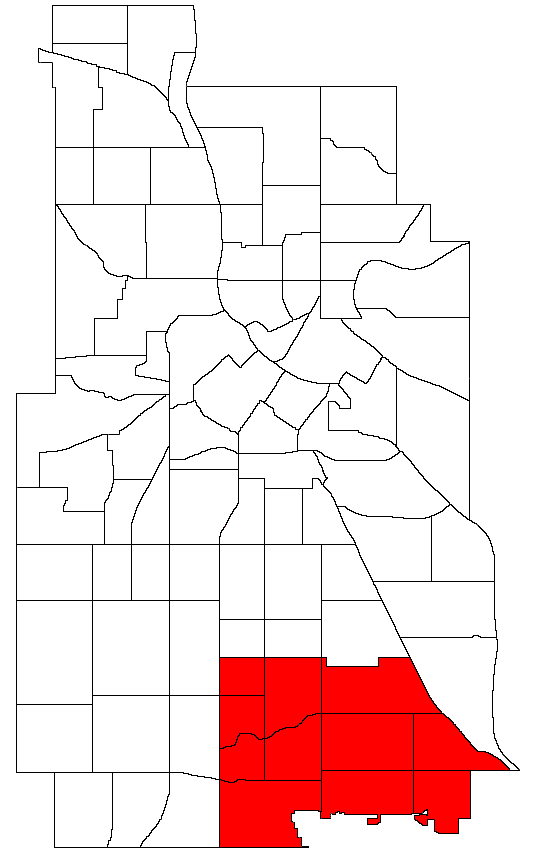
- Location of Nokomis within the U.S. city of Minneapolis
- Interactive map of Nokomis
- Country: United States
- State: Minnesota
- County: Hennepin
- City: Minneapolis
- Founded: 1849
- City Council Wards: 8, 11, 12
- Neighborhoods: List: Diamond Lake; Ericsson; Field; Hale; Keewaydin; Minnehaha; Morris Park; Northrop; Page; Regina; Wenonah

Government
  - Council Member: Soren Stevenson
  - Council Member: Jamison Whiting
  - Council Member: Aurin Chowdhury

Area
  - Total: 7.728 sq mi (20.02 km^{2})

Population (2020)
  - Total: 38,551
  - Density: 4,988/sq mi (1,926/km^{2})
- Time zone: UTC-6 (CST)
  - Summer (DST): UTC-5 (CDT)
- ZIP code: 55406, 55407, 55409, 55417, 55419, 55423
- Area code: 612

Historical population
Census	Pop.	Note	%±
1980	39,944		—
1990	38,514		−3.6%
2000	37,270		−3.2%
2010	37,021		−0.7%
2020	38,551		4.1%

Nokomis is a defined community in Minneapolis, Minnesota. It takes its name from Lake Nokomis. It comprises eleven smaller neighborhoods. Nokomis neighborhoods fall in Minneapolis City Council wards 8, 11, and 12 and state legislative districts 51A and 63B.

== Official neighborhoods in the Nokomis community ==
- Diamond Lake
- Ericsson
- Field
- Hale
- Keewaydin
- Minnehaha
- Morris Park
- Northrop
- Page
- Regina
- Wenonah

Keewaydin, Minnehaha, Morris Park, and Wenonah are also collectively referred to as Nokomis East.
