= Wenonah, Minneapolis =

Neighborhood of Nokomis, Minneapolis

Coordinates: 44.8959°N 93.2356°W

Wenonah Winuŋna
- Neighborhood
- Mother Lake, near MSP Airport

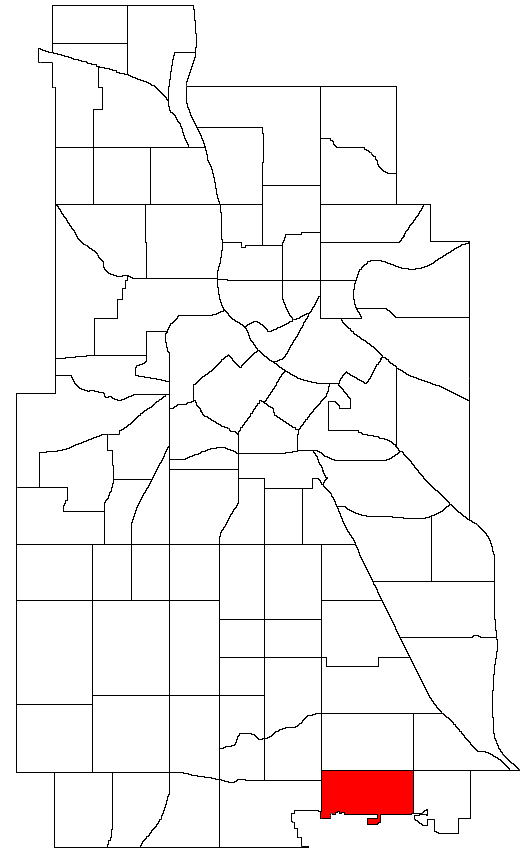
- Wenonah's boundaries (top) and location within Minneapolis (bottom)
- Interactive map of Wenonah
- Country: United States
- State: Minnesota
- County: Hennepin
- City: Minneapolis
- Community: Nokomis
- City Council Ward: 11

Government
  - Council Member: Jamison Whiting

Area
  - Total: 1.226 sq mi (3.18 km^{2})

Population (2020)
  - Total: 4,368
  - Density: 3,563/sq mi (1,376/km^{2})
- Time zone: UTC-6 (CST)
  - Summer (DST): UTC-5 (CDT)
- ZIP code: 55417
- Area code: 612

Wenonah is a neighborhood on the southeast side of Minneapolis, Minnesota. Its boundaries are 54th Street to the north, 34th Avenue to the east, the Minneapolis-Saint Paul International Airport to the south, and Cedar Avenue to the west. The neighborhood contains a portion of Lake Nokomis.

== Geography ==
Historical population
Census	Pop.	Note	%±
1980	4,355		—
1990	4,159		−4.5%
2000	4,422		6.3%
2010	4,521		2.2%
2020	4,368		−3.4%

Wenonah is located in the southeast portion of Minneapolis, as part of a greater community of 11 neighborhoods called Nokomis. The neighborhood is about twice as long laterally as it is longitudinally, or about 6,500 by 3,000 feet (1,980 m × 910 m). Its boundaries are defined by 54th Street East to the north, 34th Avenue South to the east, the Minneapolis-Saint Paul International Airport to the south, and Cedar Avenue to the west. For the most part, the neighborhood lies to the north of Minnesota State Highway 62 with the exception of a vestigial 33-property area surrounded on three sides by the Airport and only connected to the greater neighborhood by 28th Avenue South, which runs below Highway 62. The neighborhood also encompasses a portion of Lake Nokomis to the northwest.

Wenonah borders three other neighborhoods directly, including Diamond Lake to the west, Keewaydin to the north, and Morris Park to the east, and touches corners with Minnehaha to the northeast. Keewaydin, Morris Park, Minnehaha, and Wenonah together comprise the community of Nokomis East, served by the Nokomis East Neighborhood Association (NENA).

The neighborhood is generally very flat, with elevations between 814 and 821 feet (248 and 250 m) above sea level recorded by the United States Geological Survey in the neighborhood boundaries. Lake Nokomis dips to 30 feet (9.1 m) below surface level in Wenonah's portion of the lake.

== Demographics ==
Race/ethnicity
Race/ethnicity	2000		2010		2020	
Race/ethnicity	Number	%	Number	%	Number	%
White alone	3,023	68.36	2,627	58.11	2,628	59.54
Black alone	574	12.98	705	15.59	644	14.59
Hispanic or Latino (any race)	430	9.72	804	17.78	642	14.54
Native American alone	90	2.04	92	2.03	75	1.70
Asian alone	144	3.26	126	2.79	115	2.61
Other race alone	15	0.34	24	0.53	25	0.57
Pacific Islander alone	1	0.02	1	0.02	0	0.00
Two or more races	145	3.28	142	3.14	285	6.46
Total	4,422	100.0	4,521	100.0	4,414	100.0

== Politics ==
Wenonah is located in ward 11 of the city council and state legislative district 63B.
