= Page, Minneapolis =

Coordinates: 44.9077°N 93.2696°W

Page
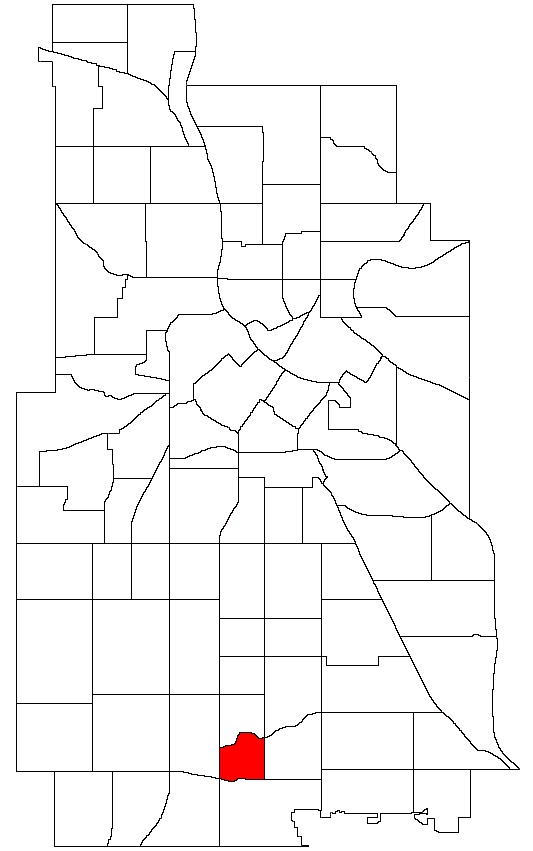
- Location of Page within the U.S. city of Minneapolis
- Interactive map of Page
- Country: United States
- State: Minnesota
- County: Hennepin
- City: Minneapolis
- Community: Nokomis
- City Council Ward: 11

Government
  - Council Member: Jamison Whiting

Area
  - Total: 0.331 sq mi (0.86 km^{2})

Population (2020)
  - Total: 1,739
  - Density: 5,250/sq mi (2,030/km^{2})
- Time zone: UTC-6 (CST)
  - Summer (DST): UTC-5 (CDT)
- ZIP code: 55417, 55419
- Area code: 612

Historical population
Census	Pop.	Note	%±
1980	1,816		—
1990	1,742		−4.1%
2000	1,682		−3.4%
2010	1,730		2.9%
2020	1,739		0.5%

Page is a neighborhood in the Nokomis community in Minneapolis. Its boundaries are the Minnehaha Creek to the north, Chicago Avenue to the east, Diamond Lake Road and East 55th Street to the south, and Interstate 35W to the west. It is located within Ward 11 of the city council and state legislative districts 62B and 63B.

The Page neighborhood, together with Hale and Diamond Lake, is represented by the Hale Page Diamond Lake Community Association (HDPL). It is home to Pearl Park, a MPRB park with a recreation center across the street from Diamond Lake.

The neighborhood is named after the now demolished Page Elementary School, which was in turn named in honor of author and diplomat Walter Hines Page.

== Demographics ==
Race/ethnicity
Race/ethnicity	2000		2010		2020	
Race/ethnicity	Number	%	Number	%	Number	%
White alone	1,525	90.67	1,523	88.03	1,564	84.95
Black alone	72	4.28	59	3.41	44	2.39
Hispanic or Latino (any race)	26	1.55	46	2.66	55	2.99
Native American alone	6	0.36	8	0.46	2	0.11
Asian alone	22	1.31	40	2.31	41	2.23
Other race alone	1	0.06	2	0.12	10	0.54
Pacific Islander alone	1	0.06	0	0.00	1	0.05
Two or more races	29	1.72	52	3.01	124	6.74
Total	1,682	100.0	1,730	100.0	1,841	100.0
