= Neighborhoods of Minneapolis =

Official communities and neighborhood of Minneapolis

Map of Minneapolis neighborhoods and communities.

Minneapolis is officially defined by its city council as divided into 83 neighborhoods. The neighborhoods are historically grouped into 11 communities. Informally, there are city areas with colloquial labels. Residents may also group themselves by their city street suffixes: North, Northeast, South, and Southeast.

== General areas ==
The local community defines several general areas based on the directional suffixes added to streets in the city. These city areas do not necessarily correlate with official community or neighborhood definitions.

Downtown Minneapolis broadly refers to the street grid area aligned on a diagonal with the Mississippi River bend, as opposed to the true north-south grid orientation. The area north of downtown on the west bank of the Mississippi River is considered North Minneapolis. The part of Minneapolis on the east bank of the Mississippi River is divided by East Hennepin Avenue into Northeast and Southeast, approximately aligned with the communities of Northeast and University, respectively.

The entire area south of downtown is widely called South Minneapolis. The westerly portion surrounding the city's Chain of Lakes is loosely labeled Southwest Minneapolis, bounded on the east by I-35W and on the north by 36th St W, which extends west from Bde Maka Ska to the city limits.

Common conceptions of Minneapolis neighborhoods do not always align with official city maps. Residents on the borders of surrounding cities may sometimes say they live in a bordering community. Twin Cities residents and visitors frequently use generalized names based on geography, such as "North Minneapolis". What most people would consider North Minneapolis is a combination of the Near North and Camden communities, each of which is made up of several neighborhoods. This also applies to neighborhoods, with residents living by definition in one neighborhood, but classifying themselves in another.

== Neighborhood organization ==
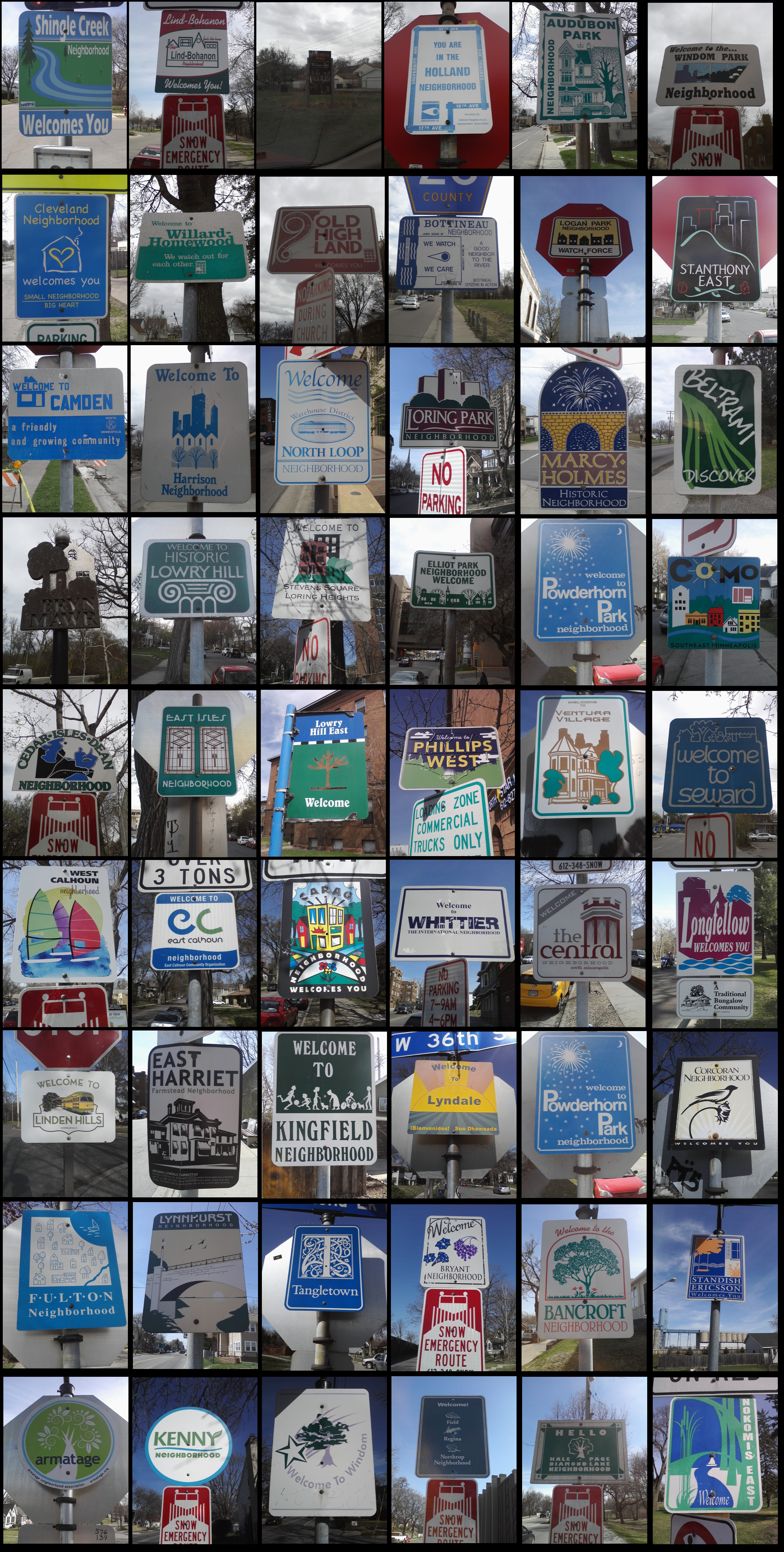
Minneapolis neighborhood markers.

The Minneapolis City Council, made up of one representative from each of the city's 13 wards, has legislative authority to define neighborhood boundaries. Community and neighborhood boundaries are not the same as the Ward boundaries, which are adjusted after each decennial census.

Minneapolis consists of 83 neighborhoods. On creating the neighborhood designation, the city grouped these neighborhoods into 11 communities, containing between 4 and 13 neighborhoods each. The official neighborhoods have a variety of origins; some were formed out of the attendance areas for elementary schools, while others are the areas of coverage of neighborhood associations activists formed between 1901 and the 1980s. Most of these neighborhoods are represented by one of 69 Neighborhood Associations, some of which cover multiple neighborhoods. In 2023, the organizations serving Beltrami and Northeast Park merged, taking the number down from 70.

The division of the city into official neighborhoods and communities occurred as part of the Neighborhood Revitalization Program (NRP) in the early 1990s. The NRP was initially a community-based program. It divided neighborhoods into three groups based on an evaluation of problem and need areas, then allocated funds accordingly. In 2012, the program lost its independent policy board and was absorbed under other city programs.

The neighborhoods remain associated with the NRP and are also used for statistical purposes. For NRP purposes, some neighborhoods have combined forces, resulting in a total of 67 NRP neighborhood action plans. As of 2024, the NRP is under the Neighborhood and Community Relations department, which also oversees the city's neighborhood organizations, community engagement projects, and language services.

Neighborhoods historically defined themselves around schools and commercial hubs, and many trace their identities to community organizations formed in the early 20th century. The oldest, the Prospect Park Association, formed in 1901 to oppose city plans to level Tower Hill. In other neighborhoods, the current official neighborhood association was formed in the 1970s and 1980s; in Linden Hills, the organization was formed in 1972 in response to proposed changes in the park, but several social and commercial organizations in the neighborhood dated to the neighborhood's development at the turn of the 20th century.

In 2020, city officials designated seven new cultural districts along major commercial corridors to promote racial equity, preserve cultural identity, and promote economic growth. Due to their location on major roads, many of these districts straddle borders between neighborhoods. The seven cultural districts are 38th Street, Cedar Avenue South, Central Avenue, East Lake Street, Franklin Avenue East, West Broadway, and Lowry Avenue North.

== Official neighborhoods by community ==
=== Bde Maka Ska-Isles ===
Official neighborhoods of the Bde Maka Ska-Isles community:

- Bryn Mawr
- Cedar-Isles-Dean
- East Bde Maka Ska
- East Isles
- Kenwood
- Lowry Hill
- Lowry Hill East (the Wedge)
- South Uptown
- West Maka Ska

Bde Maka Ska-Isles is in western Minneapolis. It is named after Bde Maka Ska (formerly Lake Calhoun) and Lake of the Isles. It includes the city's Uptown area.

=== Camden ===
Official neighborhoods of the Camden community:

- Camden Industrial Area
- Cleveland
- Folwell
- Lind-Bohanon
- Humboldt Industrial Area
- McKinley
- Shingle Creek
- Victory
- Webber-Camden

Camden is in far northwest Minneapolis. Along with the Near North, the two communities comprise north Minneapolis.

=== Central ===
Official neighborhoods of the Central community:

- Downtown East
- Downtown West
- Elliot Park
- Loring Park
- North Loop
- Stevens Square/Loring Heights

The Central community of Minneapolis sits southwest of the bend in the Mississippi River. Its definition largely aligns with Downtown Minneapolis, though some consider downtown to have smaller boundaries.

=== Longfellow ===
Official neighborhoods of the Longfellow community:

- Cooper
- Hiawatha
- Howe
- Longfellow
- Seward

Longfellow is a south Minneapolis community between Hiawatha Avenue and the western edge of the Mississippi River Gorge. It is named after poet Henry Wadsworth Longfellow.

=== Near North ===
Official neighborhoods of the Near North community:

- Harrison
- Hawthorne
- Jordan
- Near North
- Sumner-Glenwood
- Willard-Hay

Near North is northwest of downtown Minneapolis. Along with Camden, the two communities comprise north Minneapolis.

=== Nokomis ===
Official neighborhoods of the Nokomis community:

- Diamond Lake
- Ericsson
- Field
- Hale
- Keewaydin
- Minnehaha
- Morris Park
- Northrop
- Page
- Regina
- Wenonah

The Nokomis community is in south Minneapolis. It takes its name from Lake Nokomis. It includes Nokomis East, which refers to the four neighborhoods of Keewaydin, Minnehaha, Morris Park, and Wenonah that are represented by one neighborhood organization.

=== Northeast ===
Official neighborhoods of the Northeast community:

- Audubon Park
- Beltrami
- Bottineau
- Columbia Park
- Holland
- Logan Park
- Marshall Terrace
- Northeast Park
- Sheridan
- St. Anthony East
- St. Anthony West
- Waite Park
- Windom Park

The Northeast Community sits east of the Mississippi River and north of a combination of streets, highways, and rail lines running from 3rd Avenue Northeast on the southwest to I-35W on the southeast.

=== Phillips ===
Official neighborhoods of the Phillips community:

- East Phillips
- Midtown Phillips
- Phillips West
- Ventura Village

Phillips is a south Minneapolis community adjacent to downtown Minneapolis. It is named after the 19th-century abolitionist Wendell Phillips. The Little Earth residential area, which has been the center of the American Indian Movement, is within the community.

=== Powderhorn ===
Official neighborhoods of the Powderhorn community:

- Bancroft
- Bryant
- Central
- Corcoran
- Lyndale
- Powderhorn Park
- Standish
- Whittier

Powderhorn is a south Minneapolis community, named for the eponymous park and lake in its center. George Floyd Square at East 38th Street and Chicago is central border for the Bancroft, Bryant, Central, and Powderhorn Park neighborhoods.

=== Southwest ===
Official neighborhoods of the Southwest community:

- Armatage
- East Harriet
- Fulton
- Kenny
- King Field
- Linden Hills
- Lynnhurst
- Tangletown
- Windom

The Southwest community surrounds Lake Harriet in southwest Minneapolis and is one of several communities comprising south Minneapolis.

=== University ===
Official neighborhoods of the University community:

- Cedar-Riverside
- Como
- Marcy-Holmes
- Mid-City Industrial
- Nicollet Island/East Bank
- Prospect Park
- University

The University community is named for the University of Minnesota. It sits primarily on the Mississippi River's east bank and additionally includes the parts of the West Bank surrounding the University of Minnesota and Augsburg University campuses.

== Districts and other areas ==
Uptown is probably the best-known business district in Minneapolis besides downtown. It centers at the intersection of West Lake Street and Hennepin Avenue, but is not officially recognized as it includes parts of four neighborhoods: South Uptown, East Bde Maka Ska, East Isles, and Lowry Hill East. The Uptown Business Association focuses on the area within a few blocks of Lake and Hennepin, but the "Uptown" identity can stretch as far north as Franklin Avenue and as far east as Lyndale Avenue, where it merges into Lyn-Lake.

Eat Street is the newest of Minneapolis's commercial districts, named in the late 1990s by the Whittier Alliance to promote the international variety of restaurants along Nicollet Avenue South between Grant St. and 29th St. Nicollet was historically a central commercial district in the Whittier neighborhood, but the end of the streetcar system and the construction of a K-Mart at the intersection of Nicollet and Lake Street disconnected the area in the 1970s. The named district was an effort to give the neighborhood a fresh identity.

The Old St. Anthony district, also called Northeast or the Riverfront District, straddles the neighborhoods of Marcy-Holmes and Nicollet Island/East Bank. It was the downtown for the city of St. Anthony before it joined Minneapolis in 1872.

Several areas around the University of Minnesota have additional names. Dinkytown is an area just north of the University of Minnesota within the official Marcy-Holmes neighborhood, heavily populated by students. A row of historic fraternity houses along University Avenue is called "fraternity row." Similarly, Stadium Village on the east end of campus in Prospect Park is named for the now-demolished Memorial Stadium and current Huntington Bank Stadium.

Minneapolis skyline as viewed from the Warehouse District at night, 2017.

The Warehouse District was a 19th- and early 20th-century rail and truck shipping center for the region. In the 1970s and 1980s it became an artists' quarter, and then a nightlife and entertainment district, which the southern portion (between I-394 and Hennepin Ave) remains. The district is largely in the North Loop neighborhood, but the heart of the entertainment district is in Downtown West. The City designated some of this area the Minneapolis Warehouse Historic District in 1978, with portions spanning from 1st Avenue North to 10th Avenue North and from the Mississippi River to 6th Street North. It was recognized by the National Register of Historic Places in 1989.

Homewood is a historically significant area in Willard-Hay, bounded by Plymouth Avenue to the north, Penn Avenue to the east, Oak Park Avenue to the south, and Xerxes Avenue to the west. This area was central to the North Side Jewish community beginning in the early 1910s. It was designated by the city as the Homewood Historic District on February 28, 2017, due to its rich Jewish history. This designation sparked some controversy among Homewood residents.

George Floyd Square, officially George Perry Floyd Square, is centered on the intersection of 38th Street and Chicago Avenue, the site of the murder of George Floyd. It lies between the neighborhoods of Bancroft, Bryant, Central, and Powderhorn Park. The area sits along the 38th street cultural district and features memorials, nonprofits, and businesses, acting as both a memorial space and a location for community organizing.

As the Mississippi riverfront downtown has been redeveloped since the 1980s, there have been several attempts to rebrand it. The "Mississippi Mile" spanned both sides of the river from Plymouth Avenue to Portland Avenue, but never really caught on locally. "Saint Anthony Main", the name of a commercial development on Main Street Southeast, can refer to the section of the East Bank around it. More recently, people have come to call the West Bank between 3rd Avenue and the University "The Mill District", though the historic locations of mills were on both sides of the river.

Some neighborhoods enjoy nicknames. Lowry Hill East is also known as "The Wedge" because of its shape. Local amenities are also taken on as nicknames. "Minnehaha" refers to the area by Minnehaha Falls rather than along Minnehaha Avenue, as evidenced by the location of the Minnehaha Historic District. "Tower (Hill)", along University Avenue Southeast in Prospect Park, refers to the Witch's Hat Tower.

== See also ==
- Neighborhoods in Saint Paul
