= Field, Minneapolis =

Neighborhood of Nokomis, Minneapolis

Coordinates: 44.9148°N 93.2697°W

Field
- Neighborhood
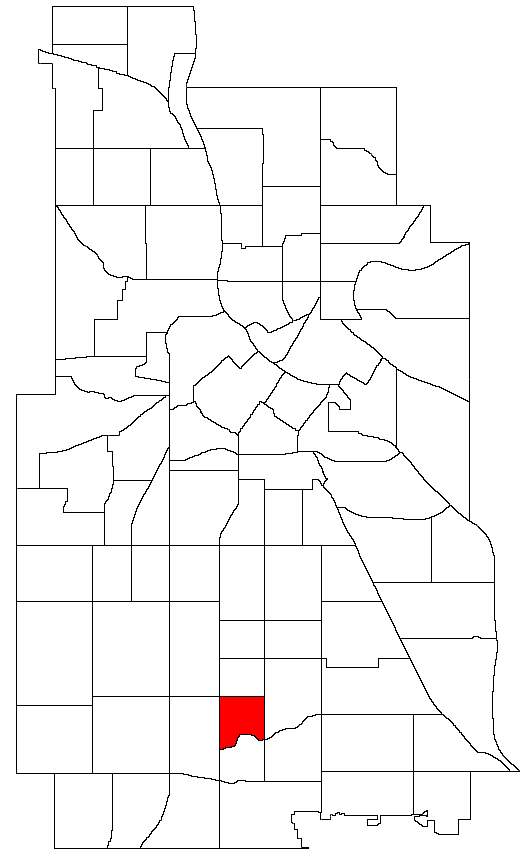
- Location of Field within the U.S. city of Minneapolis
- Interactive map of Field
- Country: United States
- State: Minnesota
- County: Hennepin
- City: Minneapolis
- Community: Nokomis
- City Council Wards: 8, 11

Government
  - Council Member: Soren Stevenson
  - Council Member: Jamison Whiting

Area
  - Total: 0.346 sq mi (0.90 km^{2})

Population (2020)
  - Total: 2,642
  - Density: 7,640/sq mi (2,950/km^{2})
- Time zone: UTC-6 (CST)
  - Summer (DST): UTC-5 (CDT)
- ZIP code: 55407, 55409, 55417, 55419
- Area code: 612

Historical population
Census	Pop.	Note	%±
1980	2,757		—
1990	2,591		−6.0%
2000	2,526		−2.5%
2010	2,366		−6.3%
2020	2,642		11.7%

Field is a neighborhood in the Nokomis community in south Minneapolis, Minnesota. The neighborhood is bordered by East 46th Street on the north, Chicago Avenue on the east, Minnehaha Parkway on the south, and Interstate 35W on the west. Field shares a neighborhood organization with the Regina and Northrop neighborhoods, called the Field Regina Northrop Neighborhood Group (FRNNG).

It is part of Minneapolis City Council wards 8 and 11 and state legislative district 63B.

Field takes its name from Field Elementary School, a school for grades 3-5 named after Eugene Field, a writer of children's poetry. The largely-residential neighborhood is characterized by small, two-bedroom, pre-1940s homes made from stucco, brick, and stone. Chicago Avenue is the main commercial thoroughfare in the neighborhood. Field is home to the Arthur and Edith Lee House historic place.

== Demographics ==
Race/ethnicity
Race/ethnicity	2000		2010		2020	
Race/ethnicity	Number	%	Number	%	Number	%
White alone	1,640	64.92	1,633	69.02	1,850	73.56
Black alone	584	23.12	397	16.78	296	11.77
Hispanic or Latino (any race)	81	3.21	123	5.20	140	5.57
Native American alone	14	0.55	22	0.93	9	0.36
Asian alone	92	3.64	52	2.20	32	1.27
Other race alone	3	0.12	16	0.68	30	1.19
Pacific Islander alone	0	0.00	0	0.00	1	0.04
Two or more races	112	4.43	123	5.20	157	6.24
Total	2,526	100.0	2,366	100.0	2,515	100.0
