= Windom Park, Minneapolis =

Coordinates: 45.0091°N 93.2356°W

Windom Park
- Neighborhood
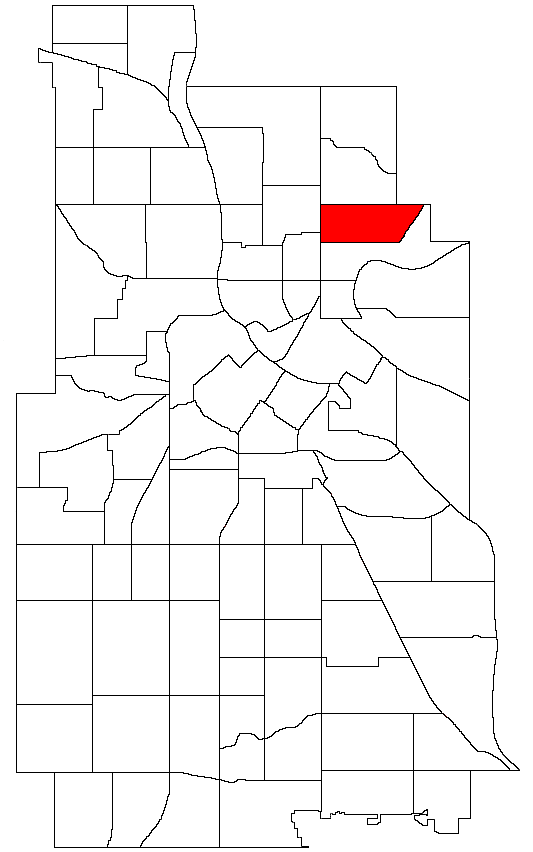
- Location of Windom Park within the U.S. city of Minneapolis
- Interactive map of Windom Park
- Country: United States
- State: Minnesota
- County: Hennepin
- City: Minneapolis
- Community: Northeast
- City Council Ward: 1

Government
  - Council Member: Elliott Payne

Area
  - Total: 0.594 sq mi (1.54 km^{2})

Population (2020)
  - Total: 5,734
  - Density: 9,650/sq mi (3,730/km^{2})
- Time zone: UTC-6 (CST)
  - Summer (DST): UTC-5 (CDT)
- ZIP code: 55418
- Area code: 612

Historical population
Census	Pop.	Note	%±
1980	5,974		—
1990	5,809		−2.8%
2000	5,786		−0.4%
2010	5,678		−1.9%
2020	5,734		1.0%

Windom Park is a neighborhood in the Northeast community in Minneapolis.

== Location and Characteristics ==
Windom Park is bounded by Lowry Avenue NE to the north, New Brighton Boulevard to the east, 18th Avenue NE to the south, and Central Avenue to the west. It is one of ten neighborhoods in Ward 1 of Minneapolis, currently represented by Council President Elliott Payne.

The neighborhood's housing stock is split evenly between owned properties and rental properties. In 2006, the average home sale price in Windom Park was $240,500. In the west part of the neighborhood, houses were mostly built between 1895 and 1910. On the east side, most houses were built after World War II.

The rental property is primarily concentrated in a complex of apartments between Ulysses and Arthur Street south of 19th Avenue. Additional rental property is scattered throughout the neighborhood. Greater amounts of rental property exist west of Johnson than on the east side of the neighborhood.

== Demographics ==
Race/ethnicity
Race/ethnicity	2000		2010		2020	
Race/ethnicity	Number	%	Number	%	Number	%
White alone	4,580	79.16	4,019	70.78	4,030	71.13
Black alone	427	7.38	566	9.97	488	8.61
Hispanic or Latino (any race)	302	5.22	623	10.97	541	9.55
Native American alone	114	1.97	85	1.50	45	0.79
Asian alone	187	3.23	182	3.21	216	3.81
Other race alone	18	0.31	10	0.18	17	0.30
Pacific Islander alone	2	0.03	7	0.12	1	0.02
Two or more races	156	2.70	186	3.28	328	5.79
Total	5,786	100.0	5,678	100.0	5,666	100.0
