= Dean Zimmermann =

American politician in Minnesota

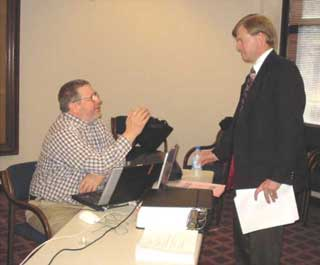
Dean Zimmermann giving a presentation about personal rapid transit at Minneapolis City Hall with State Rep. Mark Olson, in 2004

Gary Dean Zimmermann is an American politician and member of the Green Party of Minnesota in Minneapolis, Minnesota. He was an elected member of the Minneapolis City Council from 2001 to 2005. Before that, Zimmermann initially served on the Minneapolis Park Board as a member of the Minnesota Democratic-Farmer-Labor Party.

== Issues ==
Dean Zimmermann has been an outspoken proponent of personal rapid transit (PRT). He developed a proposal to build a PRT system in Minneapolis consisting of 31 miles of track and 68 stations. Zimmermann "teamed up" with Minnesota State Representative Mark Douglas Olson, a Republican from Big Lake, Minnesota, to promote PRT in the media.

== Bribery charges ==
Dean Zimmermann was convicted August 10, 2006 in federal court of accepting bribes in connection with his official duties. He was found guilty on three counts of accepting cash from a local real estate developer who had business before the City Council of Minneapolis.

In December 2006, Zimmermann was sentenced to 30 months in prison for his felony convictions and served his sentence in the minimum security wing of the Federal Correctional Institution Englewood in Littleton, Colorado. Zimmermann was released from prison in July 2008 and returned to Minneapolis.
