= Regina, Minneapolis =

Coordinates: 44.9228°N 93.2708°W

Regina
- Neighborhood
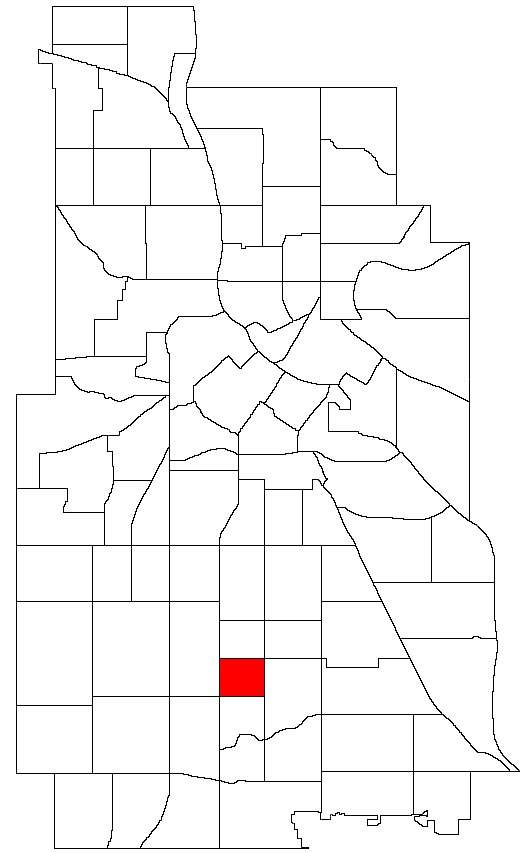
- Location of Regina within the U.S. city of Minneapolis
- Interactive map of Regina
- Country: United States
- State: Minnesota
- County: Hennepin
- City: Minneapolis
- Community: Nokomis
- City Council Ward: 8

Government
  - Council Member: Soren Stevenson

Area
  - Total: 0.299 sq mi (0.77 km^{2})

Population (2020)
  - Total: 2,331
  - Density: 7,800/sq mi (3,010/km^{2})
- Time zone: UTC-6 (CST)
  - Summer (DST): UTC-5 (CDT)
- ZIP code: 55407, 55409
- Area code: 612

Historical population
Census	Pop.	Note	%±
1980	2,550		—
1990	2,474		−3.0%
2000	2,489		0.6%
2010	2,292		−7.9%
2020	2,331		1.7%

Regina is a neighborhood within the Nokomis community in Minneapolis, Minnesota. Its boundaries are 42nd Street to the north, Chicago Avenue to the east, 46th Street to the south, and Interstate 35W to the west.

Regina is part of Minneapolis City Council ward 8 and state legislative district 62B.It shares a neighborhood organization with the Field and Northrop neighborhoods, called the Field Regina Northrop Neighborhood Group (FRNNG).

== Demographics ==
Race/ethnicity
Race/ethnicity	2000		2010		2020	
Race/ethnicity	Number	%	Number	%	Number	%
White alone	874	35.11	1,061	46.29	1,255	53.29
Black alone	1,140	45.80	679	29.62	524	22.25
Hispanic or Latino (any race)	175	7.03	341	14.88	270	11.46
Native American alone	20	0.80	19	0.83	12	0.51
Asian alone	144	5.79	82	3.58	84	3.57
Other race alone	18	0.72	8	0.35	20	0.85
Pacific Islander alone	3	0.12	1	0.04	2	0.08
Two or more races	115	4.62	101	4.41	188	7.98
Total	2,489	100.0	2,292	100.0	2,355	100.0
