= Northrop, Minneapolis =

Northrop
- Neighborhood
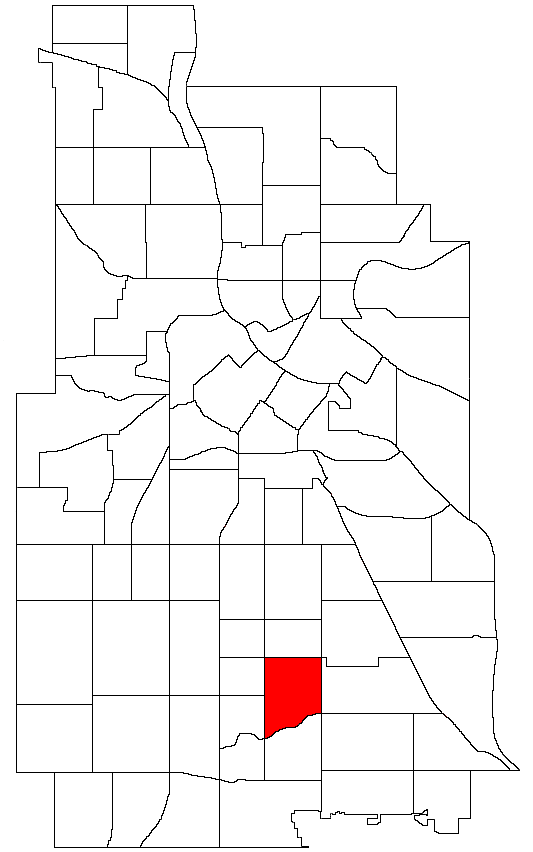
- Location of Northrop within the U.S. city of Minneapolis
- Interactive map of Northrop
- Coordinates: 44°55′11″N 93°15′18″W
- Country: United States
- State: Minnesota
- Counties: Hennepin
- City Council Wards: 8, 11

Government
  - Council Member: Soren Stevenson
  - Council Member: Jamison Whiting

Area
  - Total: 0.71 sq mi (1.8 km^{2})

Population (2020)
  - Total: 4,466
  - Density: 6,300/sq mi (2,400/km^{2})
- Time zone: UTC-6 (CST)
  - Summer (DST): UTC-5 (CDT)
- ZIP code: 55407, 55417
- Area code: 612

Historical population
Census	Pop.	Note	%±
1980	4,767		—
1990	4,683		−1.8%
2000	4,335		−7.4%
2010	4,369		0.8%
2020	4,466		2.2%

Northrop is a neighborhood located in the Nokomis community in Minneapolis, Minnesota, United States. The neighborhood is bordered by 42nd Street to the north, Cedar Avenue to the east, Minnehaha Parkway to the south, and Chicago Avenue to the west.

Most of Northrop is city council ward 11, and state legislative districts 62B and 63B.. A small portion in the north is part of council ward 8.

Northrop shares a neighborhood organization with the Field and Regina neighborhoods, called the Field Regina Northrop Neighborhood Group (FRNNG).

== Demographics ==
Race/ethnicity
Race/ethnicity	2000		2010		2020	
Race/ethnicity	Number	%	Number	%	Number	%
White alone	3,451	79.61	3,445	78.85	3,545	78.95
Black alone	357	8.24	328	7.51	254	5.66
Hispanic or Latino (any race)	206	4.75	258	5.91	300	6.68
Native American alone	53	1.22	66	1.51	35	0.78
Asian alone	120	2.77	122	2.79	105	2.34
Other race alone	7	0.16	10	0.23	11	0.24
Pacific Islander alone	3	0.07	2	0.05	2	0.04
Two or more races	138	3.18	138	3.16	238	5.30
Total	4,335	100.0	4,369	100.0	4,490	100.0
