= Minnehaha, Minneapolis =

Neighborhood of Nokomis, Minneapolis

Coordinates: 44.9105°N 93.2156°W

Minnehaha
- Neighborhood
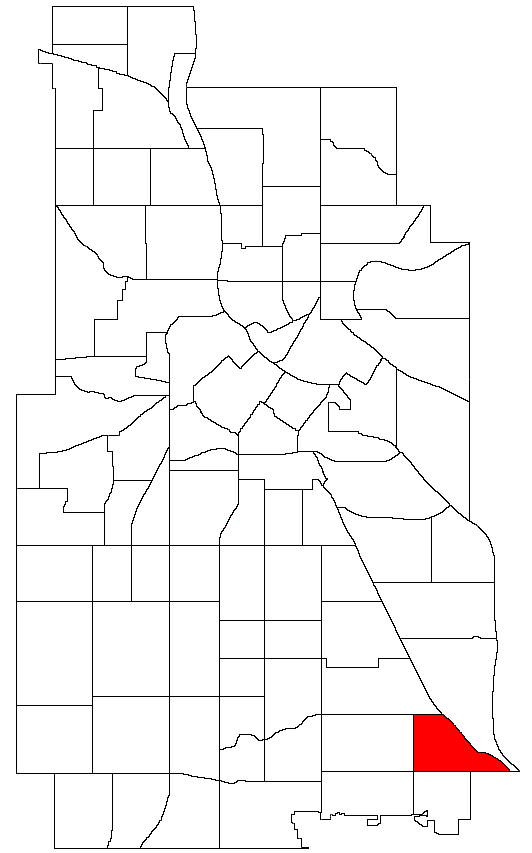
- Location of Minnehaha within the U.S. city of Minneapolis
- Interactive map of Minnehaha
- Country: United States
- State: Minnesota
- Counties: Hennepin
- City Council Ward: 12

Government
  - Council Member: Aurin Chowdhury

Area
  - Total: 0.558 sq mi (1.45 km^{2})

Population (2020)
  - Total: 4,292
  - Density: 7,690/sq mi (2,970/km^{2})
- Time zone: UTC-6 (CST)
  - Summer (DST): UTC-5 (CDT)
- ZIP code: 55417
- Area code: 612

Historical population
Census	Pop.	Note	%±
1980	4,138		—
1990	4,334		4.7%
2000	4,058		−6.4%
2010	3,980		−1.9%
2020	4,292		7.8%

Minnehaha is a neighborhood in the Nokomis community in Minneapolis, Minnesota. Its boundaries are Minnehaha Parkway to the north, Hiawatha Avenue to the east, 54th Street to the south, and 34th Avenue to the west. It is located in Ward 12 of the Minneapolis City Council, currently represented by council member Aurin Chowdhury.

It shares a neighborhood organization with the Keewaydin, Morris Park, and Wenonah neighborhoods, which are collectively referred to as Nokomis East and served by the Nokomis East Neighborhood Association (NENA).

== Demographics ==
Race/ethnicity
Race/ethnicity	2000		2010		2020	
Race/ethnicity	Number	%	Number	%	Number	%
White alone	3,835	86.96	3,230	81.16	3,371	78.54
Black alone	230	5.22	238	5.98	294	6.85
Hispanic or Latino (any race)	126	2.86	238	5.98	248	5.78
Native American alone	77	1.75	61	1.53	32	0.75
Asian alone	54	1.22	98	2.46	85	1.98
Other race alone	2	0.05	6	0.15	20	0.47
Pacific Islander alone	6	0.14	0	0.00	0	0.00
Two or more races	81	1.84	109	2.74	242	5.64
Total	4,410	100.0	3,980	100.0	4,292	100.0

== Transportation ==
The 50th Street/Minnehaha Park station of the METRO Blue Line is located in Minnehaha.
