= Keewaydin, Minneapolis =

Neighborhood of Nokomis, Minneapolis

Coordinates: 44.9099°N 93.2356°W

Keewaydin
- Neighborhood
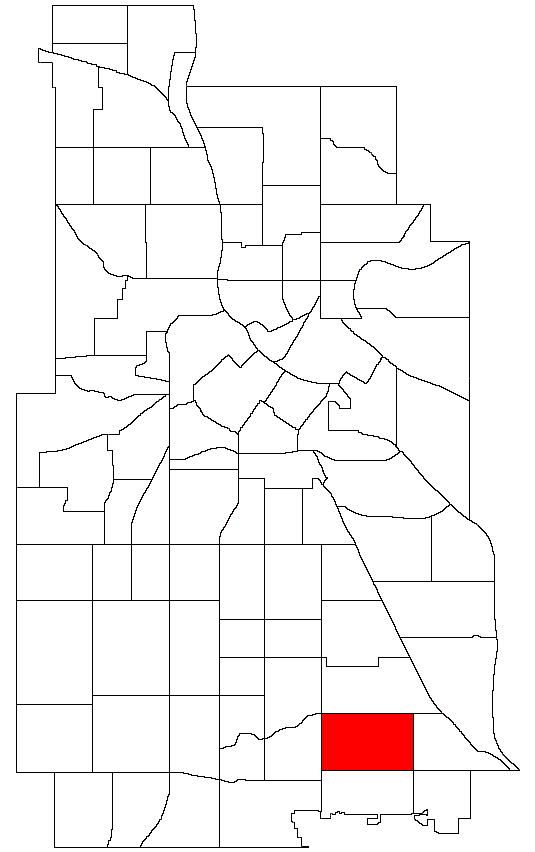
- Location of Keewaydin within the U.S. city of Minneapolis
- Interactive map of Keewaydin
- Country: United States
- State: Minnesota
- Counties: Hennepin
- City Council Wards: 11, 12

Government
  - Council Member: Jamison Whiting
  - Council Member: Aurin Chowdhury

Area
  - Total: 0.887 sq mi (2.30 km^{2})

Population (2020)
  - Total: 3,357
  - Density: 3,780/sq mi (1,460/km^{2})
- Time zone: UTC-6 (CST)
  - Summer (DST): UTC-5 (CDT)
- ZIP code: 55417
- Area code: 612

Historical population
Census	Pop.	Note	%±
1980	3,576		—
1990	3,369		−5.8%
2000	3,178		−5.7%
2010	3,096		−2.6%
2020	3,357		8.4%

Keewaydin (/kiˈweɪdɪn/ kee-WAY-din) is a neighborhood in the Nokomis community in Minneapolis, Minnesota. Its boundaries are Minnehaha Parkway to the north, 34th Avenue to the east, 54th Street to the south, and Cedar Avenue to the west.

The neighborhood contains most of Lake Nokomis. It is in both Wards 11 and 12 of the Minneapolis City Council and state legislative district 63B..

Keewaydin shares a neighborhood organization with the Minnehaha, Morris Park, and Wenonah neighborhoods, which are collectively called Nokomis East and served by the Nokomis East Neighborhood Association (NENA).

== Demographics ==
Race/ethnicity
Race/ethnicity	2000		2010		2020	
Race/ethnicity	Number	%	Number	%	Number	%
White alone	2,885	90.78	2,710	87.53	2,799	84.54
Black alone	83	2.61	90	2.91	94	2.84
Hispanic or Latino (any race)	82	2.58	127	4.10	160	4.83
Native American alone	21	0.66	50	1.61	22	0.66
Asian alone	40	1.26	53	1.71	72	2.17
Other race alone	8	0.25	2	0.06	12	0.36
Pacific Islander alone	2	0.06	0	0.00	0	0.00
Two or more races	57	1.79	64	2.07	152	4.59
Total	3,178	100.0	3,096	100.0	3,311	100.0
