= Ericsson, Minneapolis =

Neighborhood of Nokomis, Minneapolis

Coordinates: 44.92166°N 93.23032°W

Ericsson
- Neighborhood
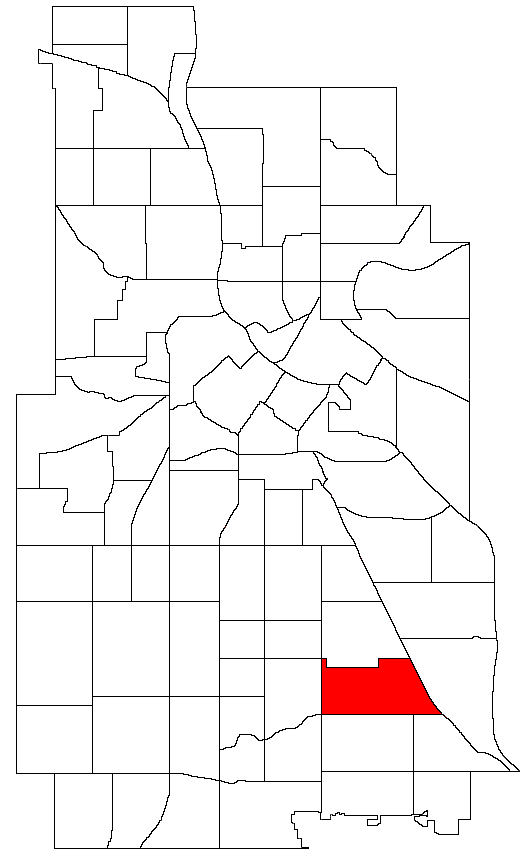
- Location of Ericsson within the U.S. city of Minneapolis
- Interactive map of Ericsson
- Country: United States
- State: Minnesota
- County: Hennepin
- City: Minneapolis
- Community: Nokomis
- City Council Wards: 11, 12

Government
  - Council Member: Emily Koski
  - Council Member: Aurin Chowdhury

Area
  - Total: 0.911 sq mi (2.36 km^{2})
  - Land: 0.827 sq mi (2.14 km^{2})
  - Water: 0.084 sq mi (0.22 km^{2})

Population (2020)
  - Total: 3,375
  - Density: 4,080/sq mi (1,580/km^{2})
- Time zone: UTC-6 (CST)
  - Summer (DST): UTC-5 (CDT)
- ZIP code: 55406, 55407
- Area code: 612

Historical population
Census	Pop.	Note	%±
1980	3,441		—
1990	3,235		−6.0%
2000	3,149		−2.7%
2010	3,192		1.4%
2020	3,375		5.7%

Ericsson is a neighborhood within the Nokomis community in Minneapolis. Its boundaries are East 42nd and 43rd Streets to the north, Hiawatha Avenue to the east, Minnehaha Parkway to the south, and Cedar Avenue to the west.

== Geography ==
The neighborhood is the site of Lake Hiawatha, which is connected to Minnehaha Creek. Ericsson shares a neighborhood organization with Standish, even though that neighborhood lies in the Powderhorn community; signs at the western, southern, and eastern boundaries of the neighborhood welcome you to "Standish-Ericsson".

Most of Ericsson is located in Ward 12, currently represented by city council member Aurin Chowdhury. The portion west of Lake Hiawatha is located in Ward 11, currently represented by council member Emily Koski.

== Demographics ==
Race/ethnicity
Race/ethnicity	2000		2010		2020	
Race/ethnicity	Number	%	Number	%	Number	%
White alone	2,587	82.15	2,568	80.45	2,653	78.61
Black alone	193	6.13	170	5.33	128	3.79
Hispanic or Latino (any race)	180	5.71	217	6.80	309	9.16
Native American alone	39	1.24	42	1.32	29	0.86
Asian alone	72	2.29	82	2.57	55	1.63
Other race alone	10	0.32	20	0.63	21	0.62
Pacific Islander alone	0	0.00	2	0.06	0	0.00
Two or more races	68	2.16	91	2.85	180	5.33
Total	3,149	100.0	3,192	100.0	3,375	100.0

== Transportation ==
The 46th Street station of the METRO Blue Line is located in Ericsson.
