= Morris Park, Minneapolis =

Neighborhood of Nokomis, Minneapolis

Coordinates: 44.8964°N 93.2155°W

Morris Park
- Neighborhood
- House in Morris Park neighborhood

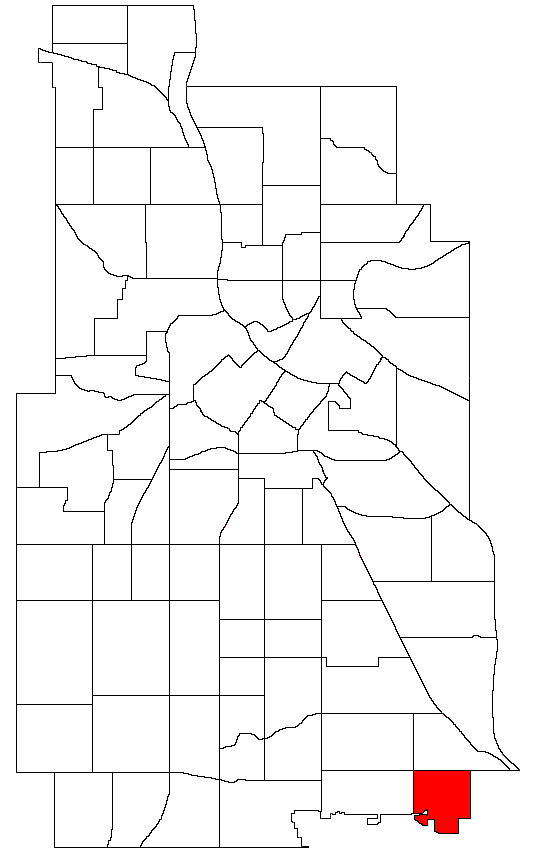
- Location of Morris Park within the U.S. city of Minneapolis
- Interactive map of Morris Park
- Country: United States
- State: Minnesota
- County: Hennepin
- City: Minneapolis
- Community: Nokomis
- City Council Ward: 12

Government
  - Council Member: Aurin Chowdhury

Area
  - Total: 0.763 sq mi (1.98 km^{2})

Population (2020)
  - Total: 2,935
  - Density: 3,850/sq mi (1,490/km^{2})
- Time zone: UTC-6 (CST)
  - Summer (DST): UTC-5 (CDT)
- ZIP code: 55417
- Area code: 612

Historical population
Census	Pop.	Note	%±
1980	3,518		—
1990	3,213		−8.7%
2000	2,984		−7.1%
2010	2,819		−5.5%
2020	2,935		4.1%

Morris Park is a neighborhood in the Nokomis community in Minneapolis, Minnesota. Its boundaries are 54th Street to the north, 46th Avenue to the east, the Twin Cities Air Force Base to the south, and 34th Avenue to the west. It is located in Ward 12 of the Minneapolis City Council, currently represented by council member Aurin Chowdhury.

It shares a neighborhood organization with the Keewaydin, Minnehaha, and Wenonah neighborhoods, which are collectively referred to as Nokomis East and served by the Nokomis East Neighborhood Association (NENA).

== Demographics ==
Race/ethnicity
Race/ethnicity	2000		2010		2020	
Race/ethnicity	Number	%	Number	%	Number	%
White alone	2,405	80.60	2,103	74.60	2,063	70.29
Black alone	177	5.93	204	7.24	221	7.53
Hispanic or Latino (any race)	91	3.05	297	10.54	351	11.96
Native American alone	64	2.14	49	1.74	24	0.82
Asian alone	127	4.26	56	1.99	71	2.42
Other race alone	10	0.34	5	0.19	4	0.14
Pacific Islander alone	1	0.03	0	0.00	0	0.00
Two or more races	109	3.65	105	3.72	201	6.85
Total	2,984	100.0	2,819	100.0	2,935	100.0
