= Diamond Lake, Minneapolis =

Neighborhood of Nokomis, Minneapolis

Coordinates: 44.8951°N 93.2608°W

Diamond Lake
- Neighborhood
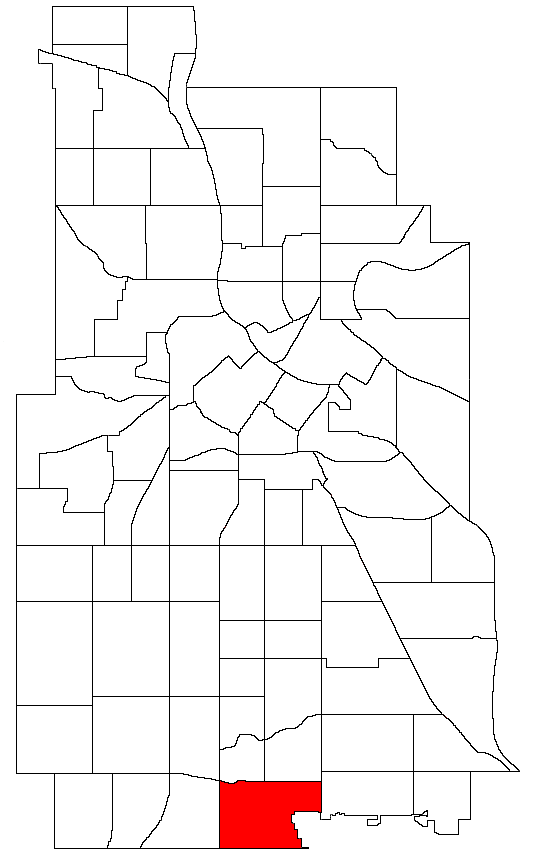
- Location of Diamond Lake within the U.S. city of Minneapolis
- Interactive map of Diamond Lake
- Country: United States
- State: Minnesota
- County: Hennepin
- City: Minneapolis
- Community: Nokomis
- City Council Ward: 11

Government
  - Council Member: Jamison Whiting

Area
  - Total: 1.199 sq mi (3.11 km^{2})

Population (2020)
  - Total: 5,700
  - Density: 4,800/sq mi (1,800/km^{2})
- Time zone: UTC-6 (CST)
  - Summer (DST): UTC-5 (CDT)
- ZIP code: 55417, 55423
- Area code: 612

Historical population
| Census | Pop. | Note | %± |
|---|---|---|---|
| 1980 | 5,760 | | — |
| 1990 | 5,487 | | −4.7% |
| 2000 | 5,251 | | −4.3% |
| 2010 | 5,480 | | 4.4% |
| 2020 | 5,700 | | 4.0% |

The Diamond Lake neighborhood is in the Nokomis community in Minneapolis. It is bounded by Diamond Lake Road and 55th Street on the north, Cedar Avenue on the east, 62nd Street on the south, and Interstate 35W on the west. It is a part of city council ward 11 and in state legislative district 63B.

The Diamond Lake neighborhood, together with Hale and Page, is represented by the Hale Page Diamond Lake Community Association (HDPL). It has approximately 2233 households within its boundaries.

== Demographics ==
Race/ethnicity
| Race/ethnicity | 2000 | | 2010 | | 2020 | |
| Race/ethnicity | Number | % | Number | % | Number | % |
|---|---|---|---|---|---|---|
| White alone | 4,533 | 86.33 | 4,366 | 79.67 | 4,524 | 76.50 |
| Black alone | 345 | 6.57 | 437 | 7.97 | 324 | 5.48 |
| Hispanic or Latino (any race) | 114 | 2.17 | 351 | 6.41 | 485 | 8.20 |
| Native American alone | 21 | 0.40 | 22 | 0.40 | 19 | 0.32 |
| Asian alone | 130 | 2.48 | 126 | 2.30 | 125 | 2.11 |
| Other race alone | 9 | 0.17 | 8 | 0.15 | 38 | 0.64 |
| Pacific Islander alone | 2 | 0.04 | 7 | 0.13 | 1 | 0.02 |
| Two or more races | 97 | 1.85 | 163 | 2.97 | 398 | 6.73 |
| Total | 5,251 | 100.0 | 5,480 | 100.0 | 5,914 | 100.0 |

== Lake ==
Diamond Lake is named for the lake of the same name. The origin of the name is unknown, but it likely comes from the shape of the lake. The lake is home to a 73-acre park in MPRB district 5, established in the late 1920s. Unlike the members of the nearby Chain of Lakes, Diamond Lake is preserved as a natural wetland, featuring only an unpaved path and a canoe launch/fishing dock.
