= Minneapolis City Council =

Lawmaking body of the City of Minneapolis

Coordinates: 44°58′38″N 93°15′56″W

Type
- Type: Unicameral

Leadership
- President: Elliott Payne, DFL since January 8, 2024
- Vice-President: Jamal Osman, DFL since January 6, 2026
- Majority Leader: Aisha Chughtai, DFL since January 6, 2026
- Minority Leader: Robin Wonsley, DSA since January 6, 2026

Structure
- Seats: 13
- Political groups: By ballot line Democratic–Farmer–Labor (12) Democratic Socialists of America (1) By affiliation Democratic Socialists of America (4) Minneapolis for the Many (other) (3) None (1) All of Minneapolis (5)
- Committees: See Committees

Elections
- Voting system: Instant-runoff voting (Note: Officially called "Ranked Choice Voting")
- Last election: November 4, 2025
- Next election: November 6, 2029

Meeting place
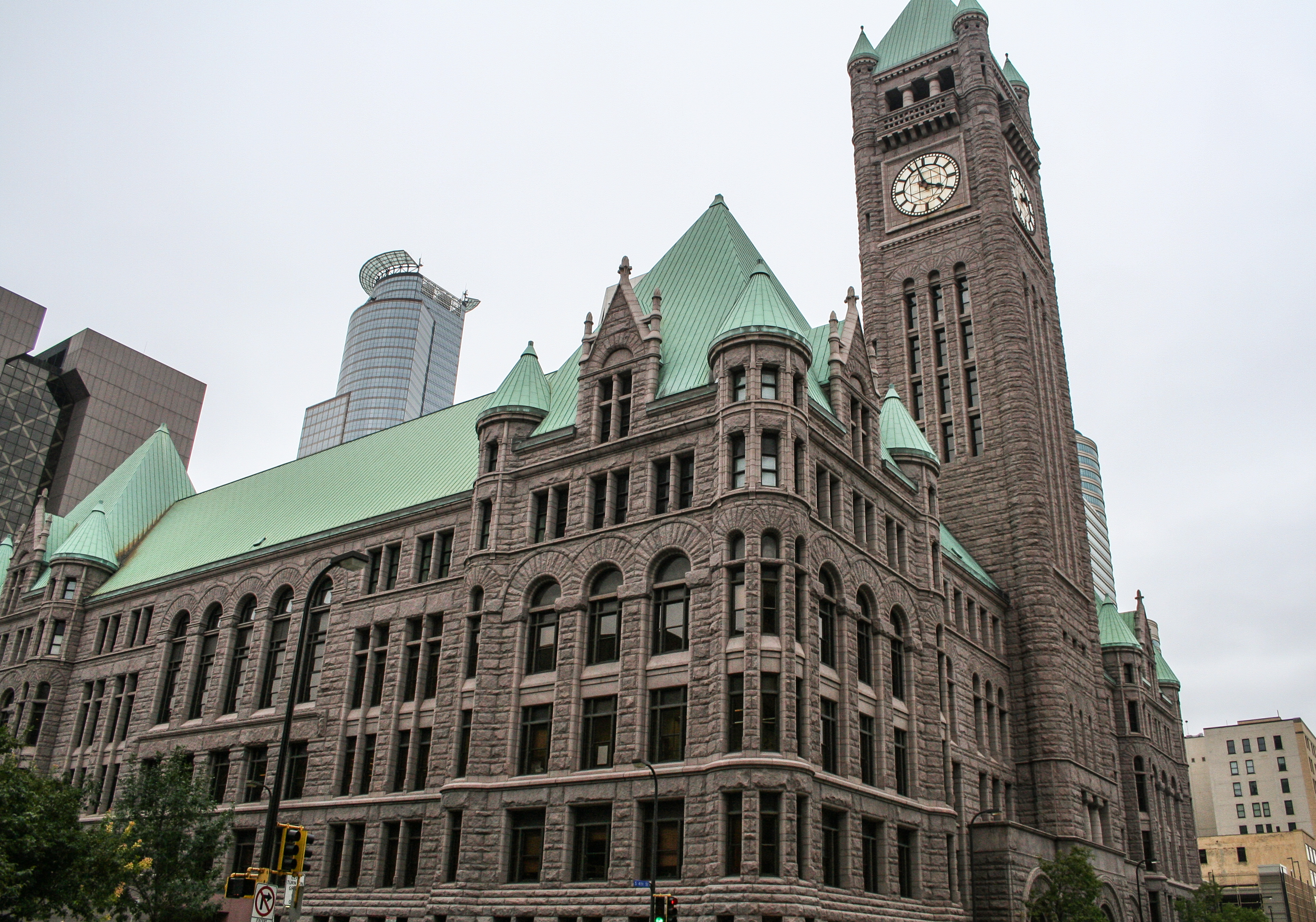
- Minneapolis City Hall; 350 S Fifth St. Minneapolis, Minnesota 55415

Website
- www.minneapolismn.gov/council/

The Minneapolis City Council is the legislative branch of the city of Minneapolis in Minnesota, United States. Comprising 13 members, the council holds the authority to create and modify laws, policies, and ordinances that govern the city. Each member represents one of the 13 wards in Minneapolis, elected for a four-year term. The current council structure has been in place since the 1950s.

In recent elections, council membership has been dominated by the Minneapolis Democratic–Farmer–Labor Party (DFL). As of 2026, 12 members identified with the DFL, while four identified with Democratic Socialists of America (three members identify as both DFL and DSA). Until the 2021 Minneapolis municipal election, the city's government structure was considered a weak-mayor, strong-council system. However, a strong-mayor charter amendment was passed, and since 2021, the mayor holds executive power and the council has purely legislative duties.

== History ==
=== Pre-charter (1850s–1920) ===
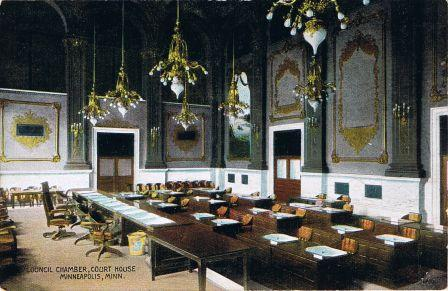
Council chambers in 1900

The Minneapolis City Council has existed longer than the city's home rule charter. The cities of Minneapolis and Saint Anthony incorporated in 1856 and 1855 respectively, each with councils of their own; in 1872, when the two cities merged, there were twenty aldermen, two representing each of ten council wards. By 1900, the council comprised twenty-six members, two from each of thirteen wards.

In 1896, Minnesota adopted an amendment allowing cities more autonomy, and debates began over how to structure the government and its council. At the time, the city had a council government with a relatively weak mayor role.

The first proposal for an independent charter shifted significant power to the mayor. In 1898, voters rejected that strong-mayor proposal. Five versions tried to organize the city in several ways and failed to reach the approval of the electorate. In 1920, the city adopted the seventh attempt at a home rule charter, establishing the city council we have today.

=== Home rule (1920–1999) ===
Over the first thirty years of the charter's existence, there were several failed plans to change the city council's role and makeup. These included proposals to change to the number of representatives or to add at-large seats. In 1929, a proposal to establish an executive mayor and legislative council gained traction after council members were caught up in a stock-market fraud scandal centering Wilbur B. Foshay; it failed to win over sufficient voters to amend the charter. Attempts to give the mayor more authority failed at the ballot box several times in this period, most notably in 1988 when it failed despite the support of mayor Don Fraser. In one of the first successful charter amendments, the city council assumed its current size of 13 single-member wards in 1951. In 1983, the term for representatives was changed from alderman to council member.

The first Black city council member was Van White, elected in 1979 to represent Ward 5. The first openly gay member, Brian Coyle, was elected in 1983 to represent Ward 6 and died of AIDS while in office as council vice president.

=== 21st century ===
==== Structure and composition ====
The city adopted instant-runoff voting in 2006, first using it in the 2009 elections.

In 2013, Minneapolis elected Abdi Warsame, Alondra Cano, and Blong Yang, the city's first Somali-American, Mexican-American, and Hmong-American city councilpeople, respectively. In 2017, Phillipe Cunningham from Ward 4 and Andrea Jenkins from Ward 8 were elected to the City Council, becoming the first openly transgender Black man and woman, respectively, to be elected to any office in the United States.

In 2021, voters approved a "strong mayor" amendment. This took away the city council's executive authority, delineating the council's role as legislative and the mayor's role as executive.

==== Major policies ====
The city council passed a resolution in March 2015 making fossil fuel divestment city policy. With encouragement from city administration, Minneapolis joined seventeen cities worldwide in the Carbon Neutral Cities Alliance. The city's climate plan is to reduce greenhouse gas emissions 15 percent in 2015 "compared to 2006 levels, 30 percent by 2025 and 80 percent by 2050".

In 2018, the city council passed the Minneapolis Comprehensive 2040 Plan and submitted it for Metropolitan Council approval. Watched nationally, the plan rezoned predominantly single-family residential neighborhoods for triplexes to increase affordable housing, seeking to reduce the effects of climate change, and tried to rectify some of the city's racial disparities. After the Metropolitan Council approved the plan, in November 2019 the city council voted unanimously to allow duplexes and triplexes citywide. The Brookings Institution called it "a relatively rare example of success for the YIMBY agenda" and "the most wonderful plan of the year."

In 2020, after the murder of George Floyd, nine city council members announced their highly controversial goals to disband the Minneapolis Police Department. Their plan included amending the city's charter to remove the requirement for a minimum number of officers, along with replacing the MPD with a broader public safety agency. The city council was then discovered to have been utilizing private security at a cost of $4,500 per day for three of their members. The plan made it to the ballot in 2021, but ended up failing with only 43% of votes in support of it; along with six of the nine city council members who wanted to disband the police department either voted out or having not ran for reelection.

==== Controversies and incidents ====
In July 2001, DFL council member Brian Herron pleaded guilty to one count of felony extortion. Herron admitted to accepting a $10,000 bribe from business owner Selwin Ortega who faced numerous health and safety inspection violations at his Las Americas grocery stores. Herron served a one-year sentence in federal prison.

On November 21, 2002, ten-year DFL council member Joe Biernat was convicted of five federal felony charges, one count of embezzlement, three counts of mail fraud, and one count of making a false statement. Biernat was found not guilty on extortion and conspiracy to extort charges.

In September 2005, Green Party council member Dean Zimmermann was served with a federal search warrant to his home by the Federal Bureau of Investigation (FBI). The affidavit attached to the warrant revealed that the FBI had Zimmermann on video and audiotape accepting bribes for a zoning change. Zimmermann subsequently lost his re-election campaign, and was convicted in federal court on three counts of accepting cash from a developer and found not guilty of soliciting property from people with business with the city. Zimmermann was released from prison in July 2008.

In 2009, council president Barbara A. Johnson was accused of misusing campaign funds for personal spending. An administrative hearing was held January 26, 2010. The administrative judges at the hearing dismissed six of the eight charges; it upheld two charges—that AAA services were paid for both her and her husband's vehicle and that not all charges for hairstyling or dry cleaning were reasonably related to the campaign. Johnson paid a $200 fine for these violations, the lowest fine possible.

In 2015, DFL council member Alondra Cano used her Twitter account to publish private cellphone numbers and e-mail addresses of critics who wrote about her involvement in a Black Lives Matter rally.

In 2021, while leaving a Pride Day event, a car containing then-Council Vice President Andrea Jenkins was surrounded by protesters who blocked her from moving until she signed a list of demands, which included not interfering with the occupied George Floyd Square and the resignation of Mayor Jacob Frey. Jenkins was stuck for over 90 minutes before signing the list so she could depart.

In July 2022, in response to incidents on the 4th of July in downtown Minneapolis during which groups of younger people were seen launching fireworks at buildings and passerby, council member Michael Rainville stated while meeting with his constituents that he was going to go to a mosque in Northeast Minneapolis to "meet with Somali elders and tell them that their children can no longer have that type of behavior." His comments drew criticism, including from fellow City Council members who attempted to censure him. Jamal Osman, Jeremiah Ellison, and Aisha Chughtai, the council's three Muslim members at the time, issued a statement calling Rainville's comments "incorrect," "inappropriate," "disturbing," and "dangerous." Rainville has since apologized.

At the Minneapolis DFL caucus for Ward 10 on May 13, 2023, supporters of challenger Nasri Warsame rushed the stage when incumbent Aisha Chughtai was scheduled to speak. Chughtai claimed that over a dozen of her supporters and DFL volunteers were physically assaulted in the chaos, while Warsame claimed his campaign manager had been hospitalized due to an injury sustained by a member of the opposing campaign's staff. Later that month, leaders of the DFL voted to permanently bar Warsame from seeking the party's endorsement for any elected office.

In February 2025, Jerry McAfee, a local pastor and leader of a nonprofit contracted with the city as violence interrupters, disrupted a council meeting with violent threats and homophobic insults towards council members, when they considered temporarily transferring violence prevention programs to Hennepin County authority. The Minneapolis Police Department met with McAfee and council leadership afterwards, but determined no crime had actually occurred.

== Structure ==
=== Electoral system ===
In 2006, Minneapolis voters approved the use of the single transferable vote for its municipal elections. The first use of ranked-choice voting was in the 2009 municipal election. However, since the City Council uses single-member districts, the single transferable vote functions the same way as instant-runoff voting. This system of voting is commonly known in the United States as ranked choice voting.

Each member's term is normally four years, and there are no limits on the number of terms a member may serve. In 2020, voters approved a plan to amend the city charter to establish city council elections in 2021 and 2023 for two-year terms instead of the regular four-year terms, with four-year term elections restarting in 2025. The amendment also granted the ability for the city to use this method whenever regular city council elections do not fall in a year ending in a 3 in order to comply with a state law designed to require city council elections in years ending in 2 or 3 after a census.

=== Wards ===
Minneapolis city council ward boundaries, enacted 2022

Each city council member represents one of 13 wards. Ward boundaries are redrawn after each census and approved by the court-appointed Charter Commission. For elections, the 13 wards are subdivided into a total of 137 precincts.

=== Salary ===
Council members have a base salary of $109,846 in 2024. Raises for council members and the mayor are based on "averaging out the increases included in the union contracts they approved the previous year." The rate was $106,101 in 2021. In 2018, all Council Members were paid a base salary of $98,696 annually, plus mileage, free parking, and the usual employee benefits. This salary included an increase of $10,000 approved in late 2017.

== Members ==
The council is made up of 13 members. The DFL holds 12 seats, while one member (Robin Wonsley) sits as an independent democratic socialist. New members took office January 2026, and in their organizational meeting, they re-elected Elliott Payne (ward 1) as council president and chose Jamal Osman (ward 6) as vice president.

Ward	Name	Party	Additional affiliation(s)	First elected	Neighborhoods
1	Elliott Payne	DFL	Mpls for the Many	2021	Audubon Park, Columbia Park, Como, Holland, Logan Park, Marshall Terrace, Mid-City Industrial, Northeast Park, Waite Park, Windom Park
2	Robin Wonsley	Democratic Socialists of America	Mpls for the Many	2021	Cedar-Riverside, Como, Prospect Park, Seward, University
3	Michael Rainville	DFL	All of Mpls	2021	Beltrami, Bottineau, Downtown East, Downtown West, Marcy Holmes, Nicollet Island/East Bank, North Loop, St. Anthony East, St. Anthony West, Sheridan
4	LaTrisha Vetaw	DFL	All of Mpls	2021	Cleveland, Folwell, Jordan, Lind-Bohanon, Shingle Creek, Victory, Webber-Camden
5	Pearll Warren	DFL	All of Mpls	2025	Harrison, Hawthorne, Jordan, Near North, North Loop, Sumner-Glenwood, Willard-Hay
6	Jamal Osman	DFL	Mpls for the Many	2020	Cedar-Riverside, Elliot Park, Phillips West, Seward, Stevens Square, Ventura Village
7	Elizabeth Shaffer	DFL	All of Mpls	2025	Bryn Mawr, Cedar-Isles-Dean, Downtown West, East Isles, Kenwood, Loring Park, Lowry Hill, Loring Heights
8	Soren Stevenson	DFL	DSA; Mpls for the Many	2025	Bancroft, Bryant, Central, Field, King Field, Lyndale, Northrop, Regina
9	Jason Chavez	DFL	DSA; Mpls for the Many	2021	Central, Corcoran, East Phillips, Longfellow, Midtown Phillips, Powderhorn Park
10	Aisha Chughtai	DFL	DSA; Mpls For the Many	2021	East Bde Maka Ska, Lowry Hill East, South Uptown, Whittier
11	Jamison Whiting	DFL	All of Mpls	2025	Diamond Lake, Hale, Keewaydin, Northrop, Page, Tangletown, Wenonah, Windom
12	Aurin Chowdhury	DFL	DSA; Mpls For the Many	2023	Cooper, Ericsson, Hiawatha, Howe, Keewaydin, Longfellow, Minnehaha, Morris Park, Standish
13	Linea Palmisano	DFL	All of Mpls	2013	Armatage, East Harriet, Fulton, Kenny, Linden Hills, Lynnhurst, West Maka Ska

== Committees ==
The Minneapolis City Council operates through several standing committees, each focusing on specific areas of city governance. As of January 2026, those committees are:

Budget Committee

- Chair: Aisha Chughtai (Ward 10)
- Vice-chair: Elizabeth Shaffer (Ward 7)
- Focus: Oversight of the city's budget, financial wellbeing, and approval of financial policies. Full-council committee.

Business, Housing & Zoning Committee

- Chair: Jamal Osman (Ward 6)
- Vice-chair: Aurin Chowdhury (Ward 12)
- Focus: Oversight of community and economic development, housing policy, land-use and zoning policy, and employment and training programs.

Climate & Infrastructure Committee

- Chair: Robin Wonsley (Ward 2)
- Vice-chair: Soren Stevenson (Ward 8)
- Focus: Oversight of community infrastructure, climate resilience, transportation, public works, utilities, and recycling.

Enterprise & Labor Relations Committee (formerly the Administration and Enterprise Oversight Committee)

- Chair: Linea Palmisano (Ward 13)
- Vice-chair: Jamison Whiting (Ward 11)
- Focus: Oversight of general government, enterprise, and administration operations; labor relations; regular evaluation of the city's Strategic Racial Equity Action Plan and the Mayor's Office.

Intergovernmental Relations

- Chair: Aurin Chowdhury (Ward 12)
- Vice-chair: Michael Rainville (Ward 3)
- Focus: Intergovernmental relations. Full-council committee.

Public Health, Safety, & Equity Committee (formerly the Public Health & Safety Committee)

- Chair: Jason Chavez (Ward 9)
- Vice-chair: Soren Stevenson (Ward 8)
- Focus: Oversight of public health and social service programs, civil rights, environmental justice, community safety services, and police reform initiatives.

Settlement Agreement and Consent Decree Subcommittee

- Chair: Jamison Whiting (Ward 11)
- Vice-chair: Elliott Payne (Ward 1)
- Focus: Oversight of the settlement agreement with the Minnesota Department of Human Rights, coordination on police reform and accountability.

Committee of the Whole

- Chair: Aurin Chowdhury (Ward 12),
- Vice-chair: Aisha Chughtai (Ward 10)
- Focus: Oversight of strategic goals, enterprise-wide initiatives, and Mayor's Cabinet appointments. Full-council committee.

== Gallery ==
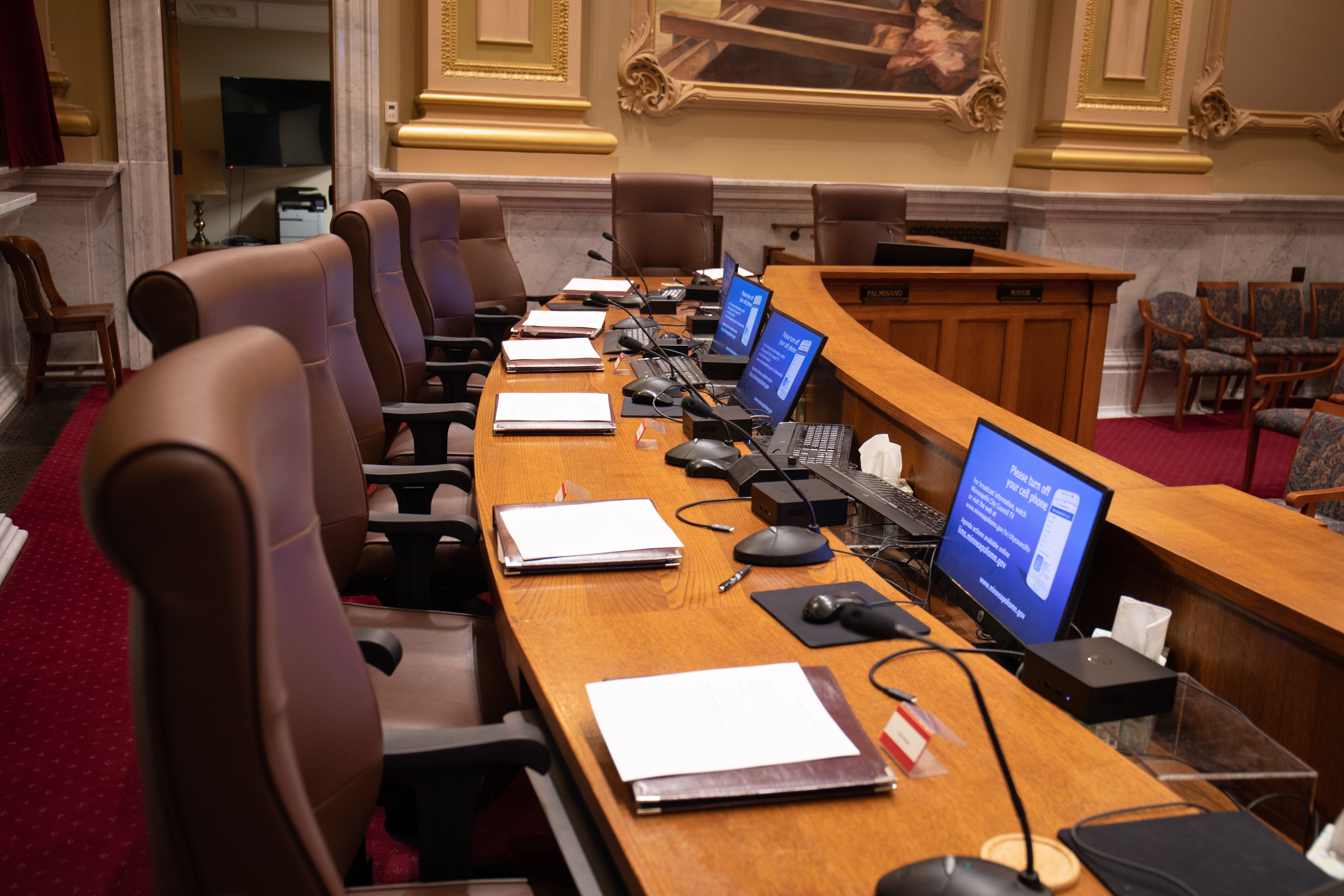
Chambers dais, 2019.

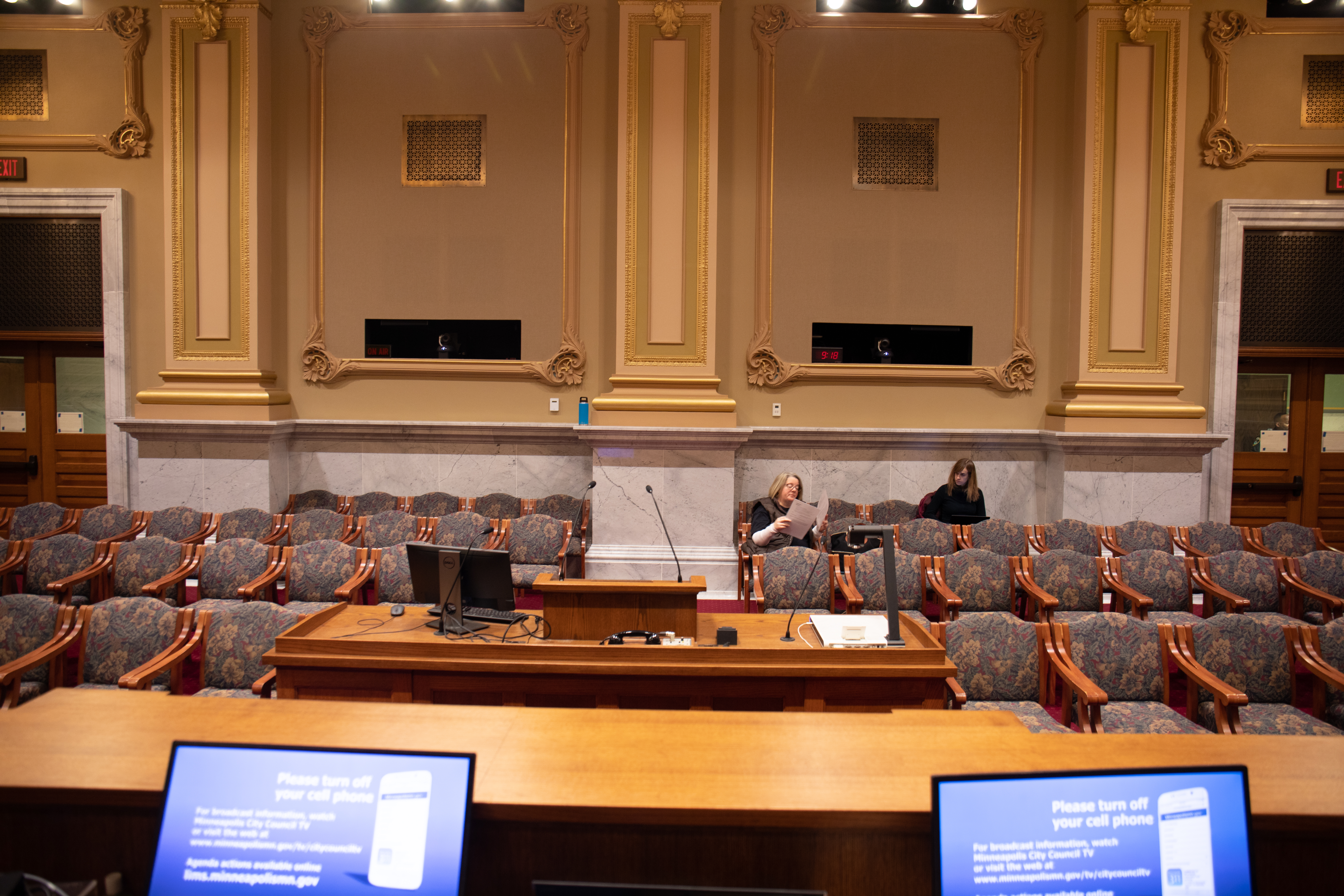
Chambers gallery, 2019.

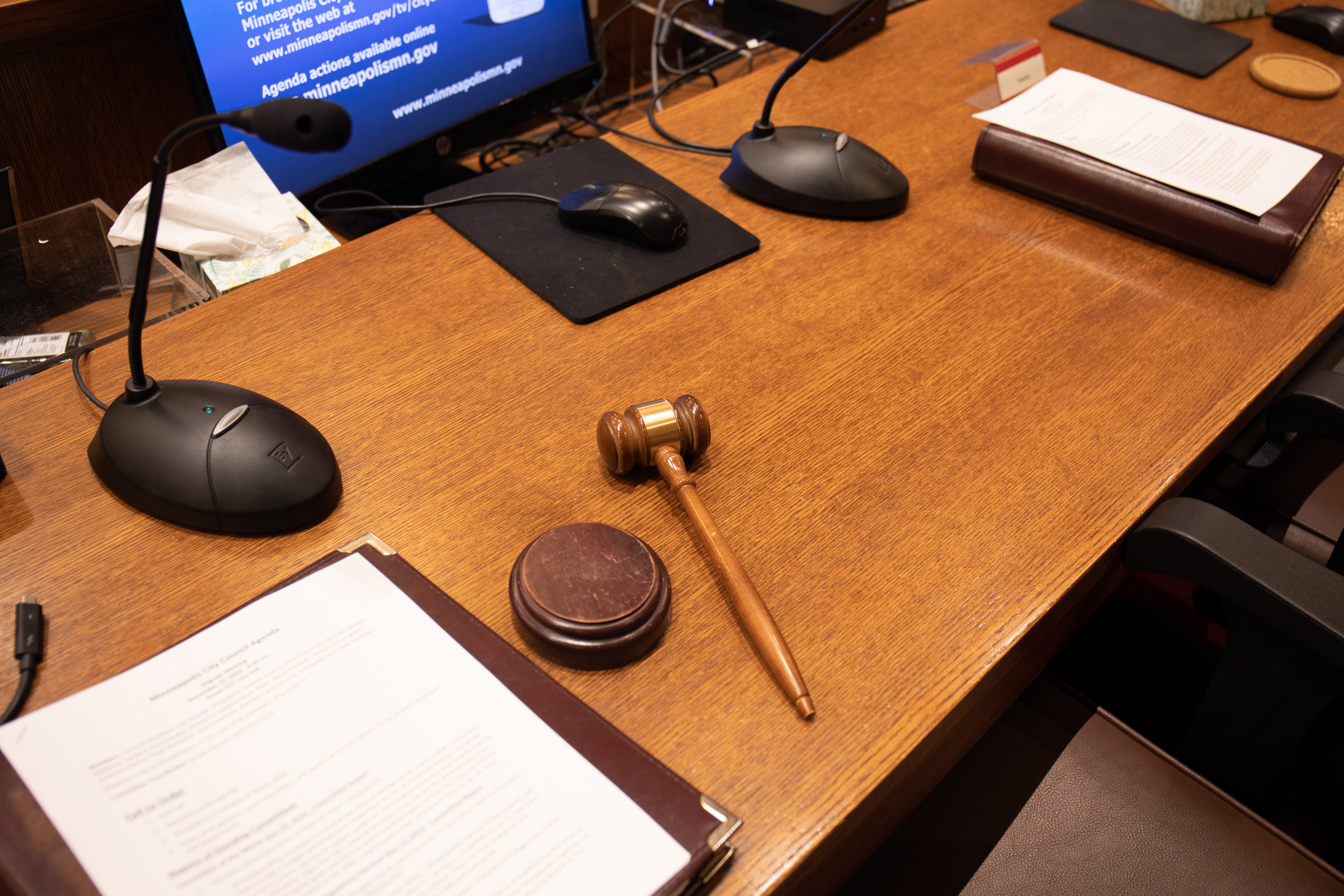
Dais gavel and microphones, 2019.

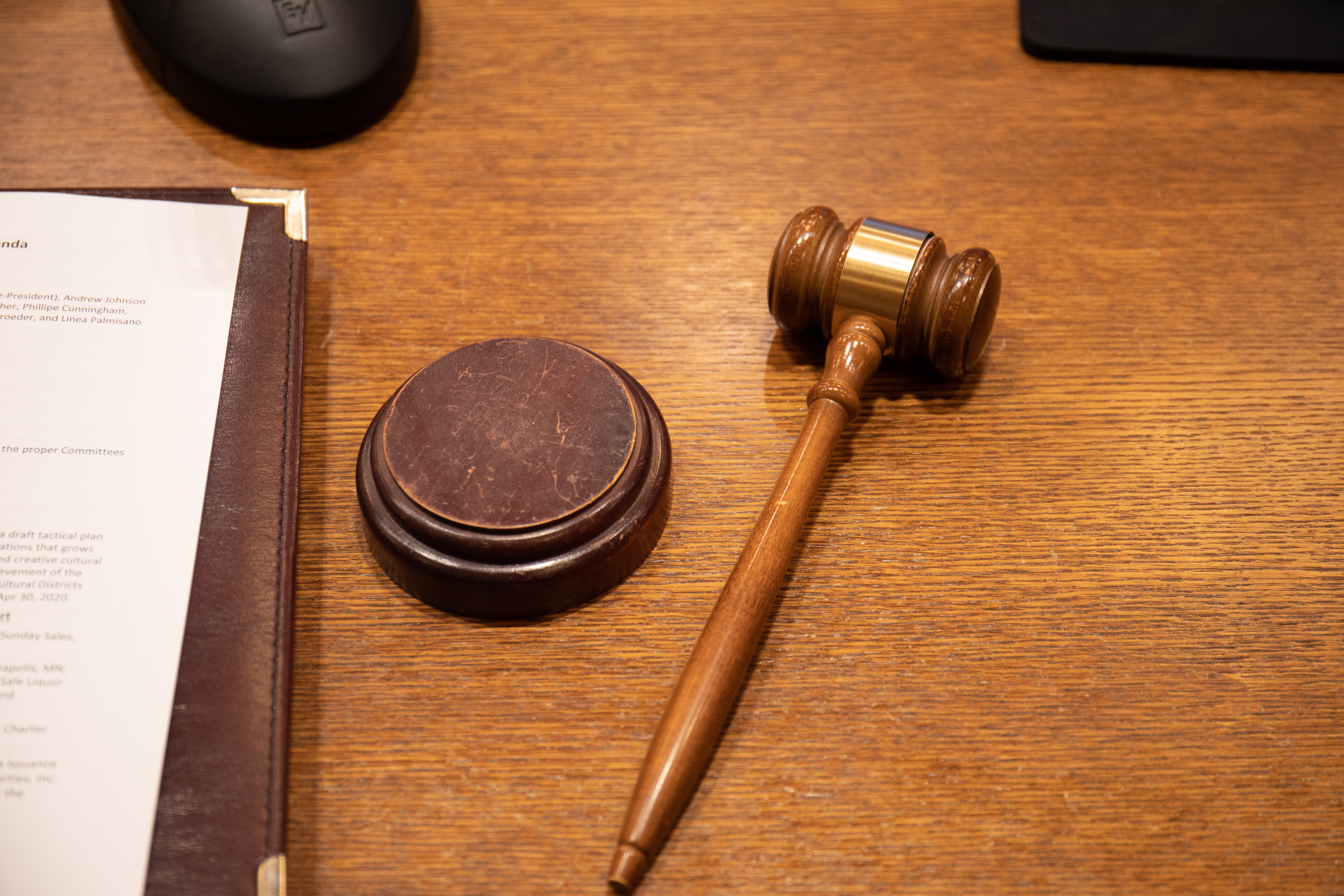
Close-up of gavel, 2019.

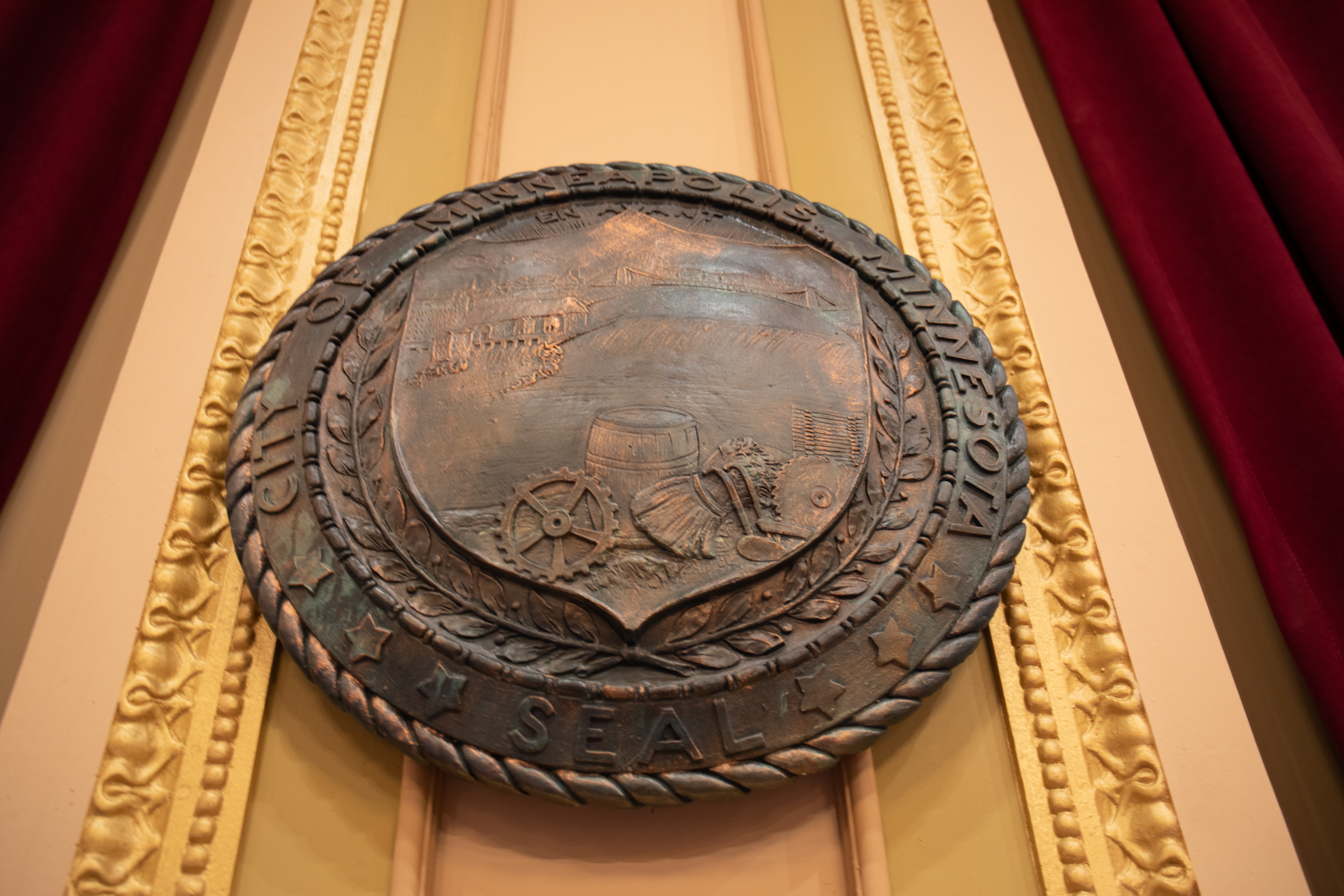
Great seal of City of Minneapolis, 2019.

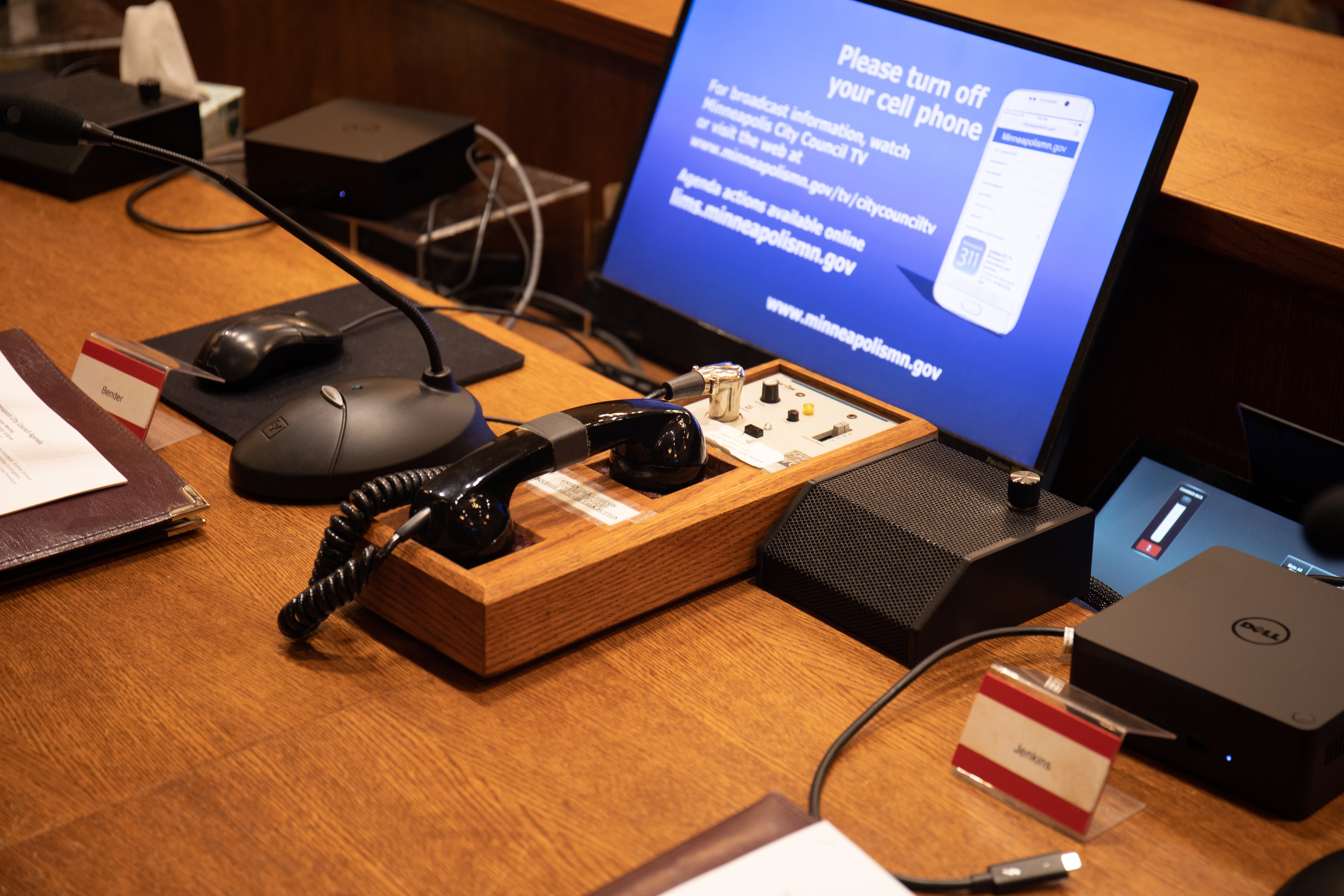
Telephone to call television broadcast booth, 2019.

== See also ==
- Government of Minneapolis
- Mayor of Minneapolis
