= Hale, Minneapolis =

Neighborhood of Nokomis, Minneapolis

Coordinates: 44.9094°N 93.2557°W

Hale
- Neighborhood
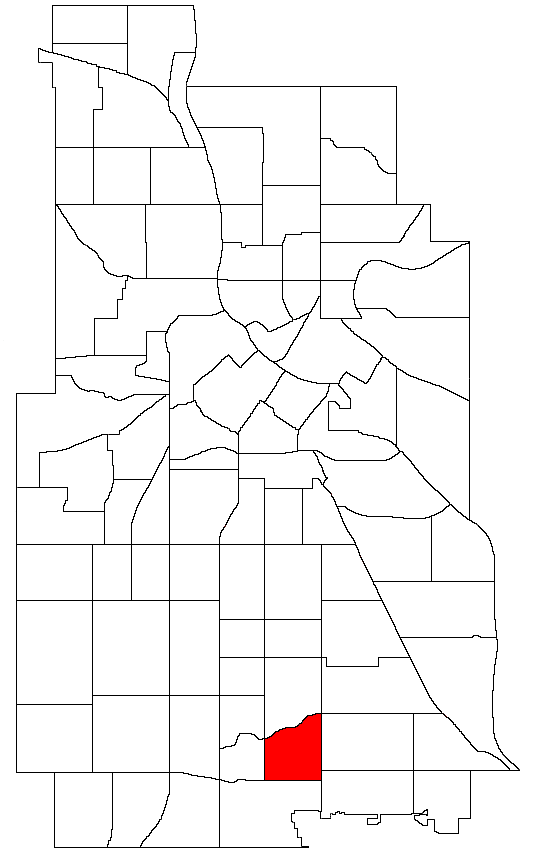
- Location of Hale within the U.S. city of Minneapolis
- Interactive map of Hale
- Country: United States
- State: Minnesota
- Counties: Hennepin
- City Council Ward: 11

Government
  - Council Member: Jamison Whiting

Area
  - Total: 0.496 sq mi (1.28 km^{2})

Population (2020)
  - Total: 3,347
  - Density: 6,750/sq mi (2,610/km^{2})
- Time zone: UTC-6 (CST)
  - Summer (DST): UTC-5 (CDT)
- ZIP code: 55417
- Area code: 612

Historical population
Census	Pop.	Note	%±
1980	3,266		—
1990	3,227		−1.2%
2000	3,196		−1.0%
2010	3,176		−0.6%
2020	3,347		5.4%

Hale is a neighborhood (within the larger Nokomis community) near the southern edge of Minneapolis. It lies south of Minnehaha Creek, north of 55th Street, east of Chicago Avenue, and west of Cedar Avenue. It is a part of city council ward 11 and state legislative district 63B.

The neighborhood takes its name from the local public school, which is in turn named after American Revolutionary War soldier Nathan Hale. Hale Elementary is a K-2 school with a pre-K program for 4-year-olds. Most of the homes in the area were built in the 1920s and 30s. The regional parks forming the neighborhood's north and east borders give the neighborhood a recreational heart.

Hale is one of three neighborhoods that banded together to form Hale Page Diamond Lake Community Association (HDPL).

== Demographics ==
Race/ethnicity
Race/ethnicity	2000		2010		2020	
Race/ethnicity	Number	%	Number	%	Number	%
White alone	2,889	90.39	2,807	88.38	2,852	85.83
Black alone	123	3.85	117	3.68	73	2.20
Hispanic or Latino (any race)	49	1.53	91	2.87	105	3.16
Native American alone	11	0.34	4	0.13	17	0.51
Asian alone	77	2.41	60	1.89	75	2.26
Other race alone	4	0.13	1	0.03	18	0.54
Pacific Islander alone	0	0.00	0	0.00	3	0.09
Two or more races	43	1.35	96	3.02	180	5.42
Total	3,196	100.0	3,176	100.0	3,323	100.0
