= Area code 612 =

Telephone area code for Minneapolis, Minnesota

Coordinates: 44°57′N 93°17′W

Metropolitan Minneapolis area codes with 612 in yellow

Area code 612 is a telephone area code in the North American Numbering Plan (NANP) in the U.S. state of Minnesota. The numbering plan area comprises the city of Minneapolis and a few surrounding municipalities such as Fort Snelling, St. Anthony, and Richfield. Geographically, it is the smallest area code in the state of Minnesota. The area code is one of the two original area codes in the 1947 nationwide numbering plan for the state, when it was assigned to a much larger area, including the entire Twin Cities region and a wide area surrounding it.

== History ==
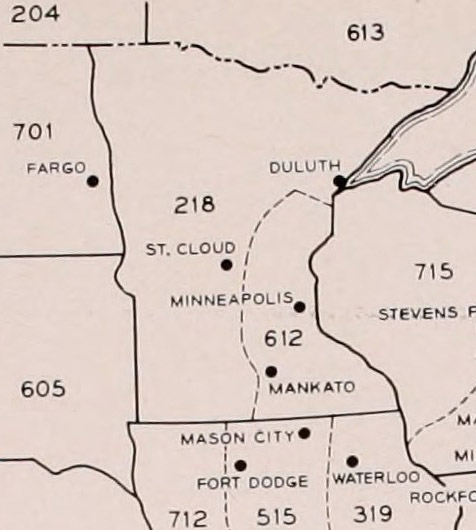
Minnesota area codes before 1954

A map of Minnesota area codes

When the American Telephone and Telegraph Company (AT&T) created the first nationwide telephone numbering plan in 1947, Minnesota was divided into two numbering plan areas (NPAs), which were identified with area codes 612 and 218. According to historical maps, 612 comprised roughly the southeastern third of Minnesota. The rest of the state received area code 218, which formed an r-shaped region around the 612 NPA. The separating line extended westward from Duluth to the center of the state, then south through the center.

In 1954, the state's area code boundaries were redrawn and the state was divided into three numbering plan areas. 612 was rotated to cover most of the central portion of Minnesota, stretching border to border from Wisconsin through the Twin Cities to South Dakota. In the process, it absorbed some of 218's southern portion, including St. Cloud and Alexandria. Part of the southern portion of the original 612 territory, including Rochester and Mankato, was combined with the southwestern portion of 218 to form the new area code 507. The 218 region was reshaped to be more square, absorbing much of the old 612's northeastern portion, and now consisted of roughly the northern half of the state. This configuration remained in place for 42 years.

In 1996, the northern and western portion of 612, including almost all of its territory outside of the Twin Cities, became area code 320. This was intended as a long-term solution. However, the continued growth of the Twin Cities and the proliferation of cell phone and pager services pushed 612 back to the brink of exhaustion within a year. In 1998, the 612 region was roughly split in half, mostly following the Mississippi River. Minneapolis and the area west of the Mississippi retained the old code, while most of the area east of the Mississippi, including St. Paul, became the new area code 651.

Within another year, however, it became apparent that the creation of 651 would not free up enough numbers in the western Twin Cities to meet demand. The Twin Cities are home to most of the state's landlines, pagers, and cell phones, and their continued proliferation forced a three-way split of 612 that took effect in 2000. Minneapolis and a few suburbs to the north and south kept 612. The northwest suburbs (Brooklyn Park, Coon Rapids, Maple Grove) became area code 763 while the southwest suburbs (Bloomington, Eden Prairie, Minnetonka. St. Louis Park) got area code 952.

The eastern half of the University of Minnesota, Twin Cities campus, in the St. Paul suburb of Falcon Heights, is an exception to the regional numbering plan. Because of an integrated telephone system linking both campuses, the Falcon Heights campus remained in 612 after the 1998 split.

612 is one of the few urbanized area codes without an area code overlay, making Minneapolis one of the few major cities where seven-digit dialing is still possible. Under current projections, it will stay that way until at least 2039.

The area code splits in the Twin Cities are unusual because they split along municipal, rather than exchange area boundaries. This led to a division of numerous exchange areas between the two area codes, and a few being divided among three.

Even with the split into four area codes, most of the Twin Cities region is still a single rate center. The four Twin Cities area codes comprise one of the largest local calling areas in the United States; with a few exceptions, no long-distance charges are applied from one part of the Twin Cities to another. Portions of area codes 320 and 507 are local calls from the Twin Cities as well.

== Service area ==
- Minneapolis
- Richfield
- St. Anthony
- Fort Snelling
- University of Minnesota, Twin Cities

== See also ==
- List of Minnesota area codes
- List of North American Numbering Plan area codes

Minnesota area codes: 218, 320, 507/924, 612, 651, 763, 952
	North: 763	
West: 763, 952	612	East: 651
	South: 952	
