= George W. Baird House =

Historic house in Minnesota, United States

- U.S. National Register of Historic Places
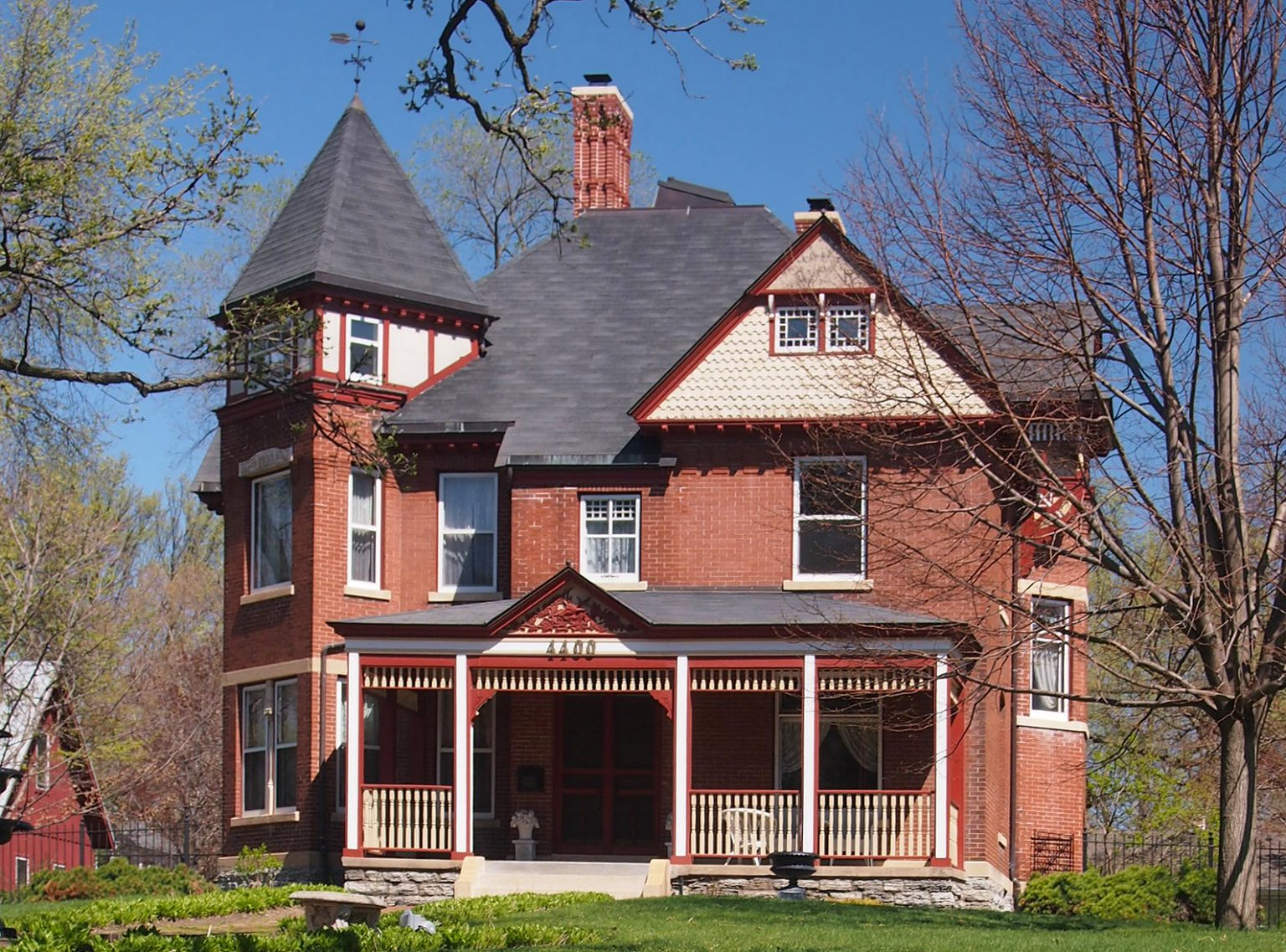
- The George W. Baird House from the south

- Location within Minnesota Location within the United States
- Interactive map showing the Baird House’s location
- Location: 4400 W. 50th St., Edina, Minnesota
- Coordinates: 44°54′47″N 93°20′14″W
- Area: 1.17 acres (0.47 ha)
- Built: 1886
- Architect: Charles S. Sedgwick
- Architectural style: Queen Anne
- NRHP reference No.: 80002067
- Added to NRHP: March 27, 1980

The George W. Baird House is a house in Edina, Minnesota, United States, built in 1886 by a prominent farmer in the Edina Mills community. The house was originally part of a 120-acre (49 ha) farmstead. The house was listed on the National Register of Historic Places in 1980 for having local significance in architecture, agriculture, and settlement.

== Architecture ==
The house is two stories tall and is built in the Eastlake style. It has a distinctive silhouette, with multiple roof shapes, dormers, a square tower, and tall brick chimneys. The large front porch has wooden posts and balusters, with a pediment over the entrance. The exterior is embellished with stone window trim, transoms, scalloped wooden shingles in the gables, and belt courses. It was designed by prominent Minneapolis architect Charles S. Sedgwick.

The house is significant for its architecture, although it is not an outstanding example of a Charles Sedgwick-designed Eastlake house when compared to other houses. (Sedgwick also designed other properties listed on the National Register, such as the George R. Newell House and Westminster Presbyterian Church in Minneapolis, and the First National Bank and the Nehemiah P. Clarke House in St. Cloud, Minnesota.)

== History ==
In addition to its architectural notability, the house recalls the agricultural roots of Edina. The owner, George W. Baird, moved from Pennsylvania to Minnesota in 1857 and bought a farm in the Edina Mills area. Baird was a promoter of scientific farming practices and pioneered in livestock breeding, and he is credited with bringing the first Merino sheep to Minnesota. Baird and his wife Sarah helped found the Minnehaha Grange Hall in 1873 and both served as Grange Masters there at different times. Sarah Baird also led the state Grange for 18 years.

In 1936, 80 acres (32 ha) of the farm were platted as the County Club District, which itself is listed on the National Register. The home is in an excellent state of preservation, thanks to attention from current and previous owners. The house received a 3,500-square-foot (330 m^{2}) addition in 2002–2003 that does not detract from the original appearance when viewed from West 50th Street.

== See also ==
- National Register of Historic Places listings in Hennepin County, Minnesota
