= Newell House =

Newell House may refer to:

- George R. Newell House (Minneapolis, Minnesota)
- George R. Newell House (Orlando, Florida)
- Newell D. Johnson House
- Newell-Johnson-Searle House
- Newell A. Whiting House
- Newell Rogers House
- Newell House School

== See also ==
- George R. Newell House
