= George R. Newell House =

George R. Newell House may refer to:

- George R. Newell House (Orlando, Florida), formerly listed on the National Register of Historic Places in Orange County, Florida
- George R. Newell House (Minneapolis, Minnesota), listed on the National Register of Historic Places in Hennepin County, Minnesota
