= Mid-City Industrial, Minneapolis =

Coordinates: 44°59′56″N 93°13′45″W

Mid-City Industrial
- Neighborhood
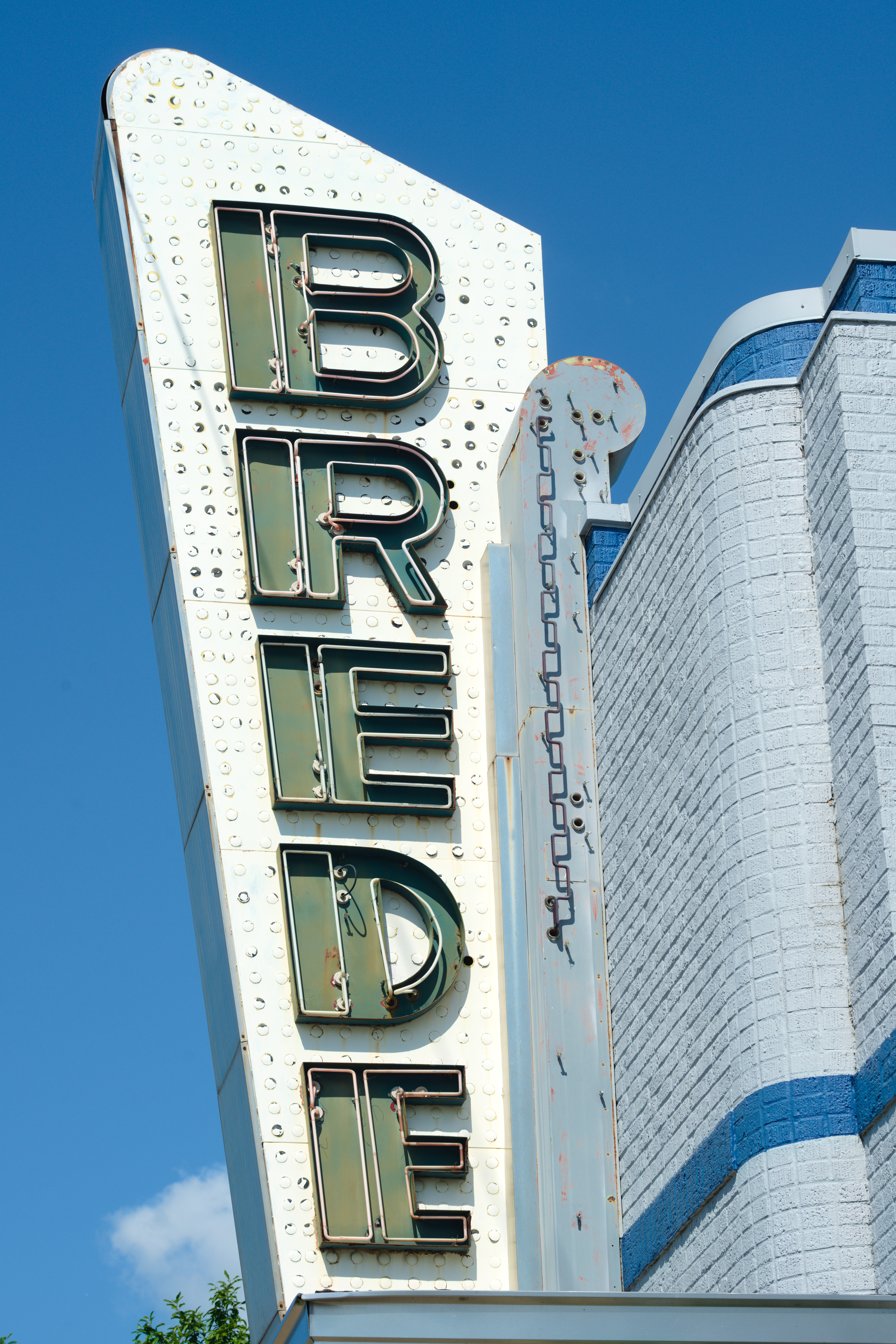
- A business sign in Mid-City Industrial.

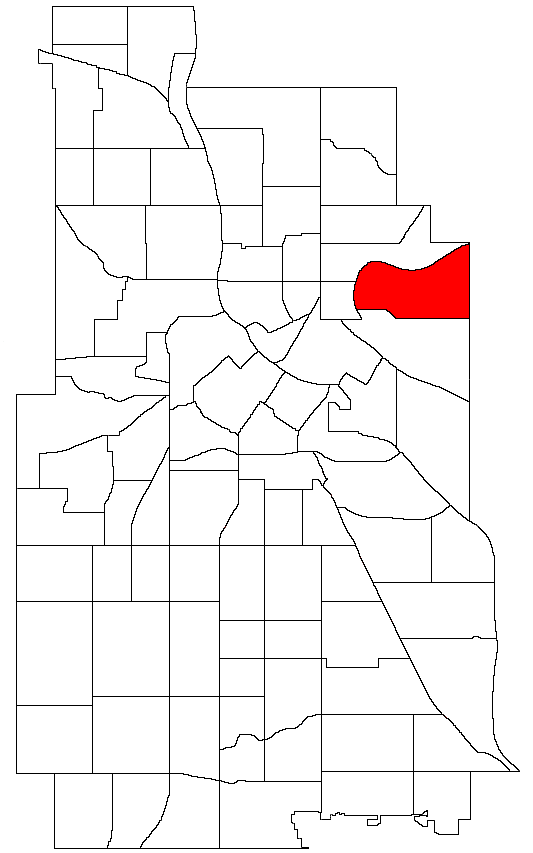
- Location of Mid-City Industrial within the U.S. city of Minneapolis
- Interactive map of Mid-City Industrial
- Country: United States
- State: Minnesota
- County: Hennepin
- City: Minneapolis
- Community: University
- Established: 1849 (1913)
- City Council Ward: 1

Government
  - Council Member: Elliott Payne

Area
  - Total: 1.053 sq mi (2.73 km^{2})
  - Land: 1.053 sq mi (2.73 km^{2})
  - Water: 0 sq mi (0 km^{2})

Population (2020)
  - Total: 276
  - Density: 262/sq mi (101/km^{2})
- Time zone: UTC-6 (CST)
  - Summer (DST): UTC-5 (CDT)
- ZIP code: 55401, 55413, 55414
- Area code: 612

Mid-City Industrial is a neighborhood in the University community of Minneapolis. It is located in Minneapolis City Council ward 1, currently represented by Minneapolis City Council member Elliott Payne, and state legislative district 60A. The boundaries of the neighborhood are Interstate 35W to the north, railroad tracks along Minnesota State Highway 280 to the east, East Hennepin Avenue and Winter Street Northeast to the south, and 35W to the west. Mid-City Industrial had no official neighborhood organization until it joined the East Bank Neighborhoods Partnership in 2025, though the neighborhood was unofficially represented by the Southeast Como Improvement Association.

== History ==
=== 20th century ===
The area, which had been used primarily for farmland, was designated an industrial district in 1913 by the city to separate residential and industrial land uses. It began developing after World War I.

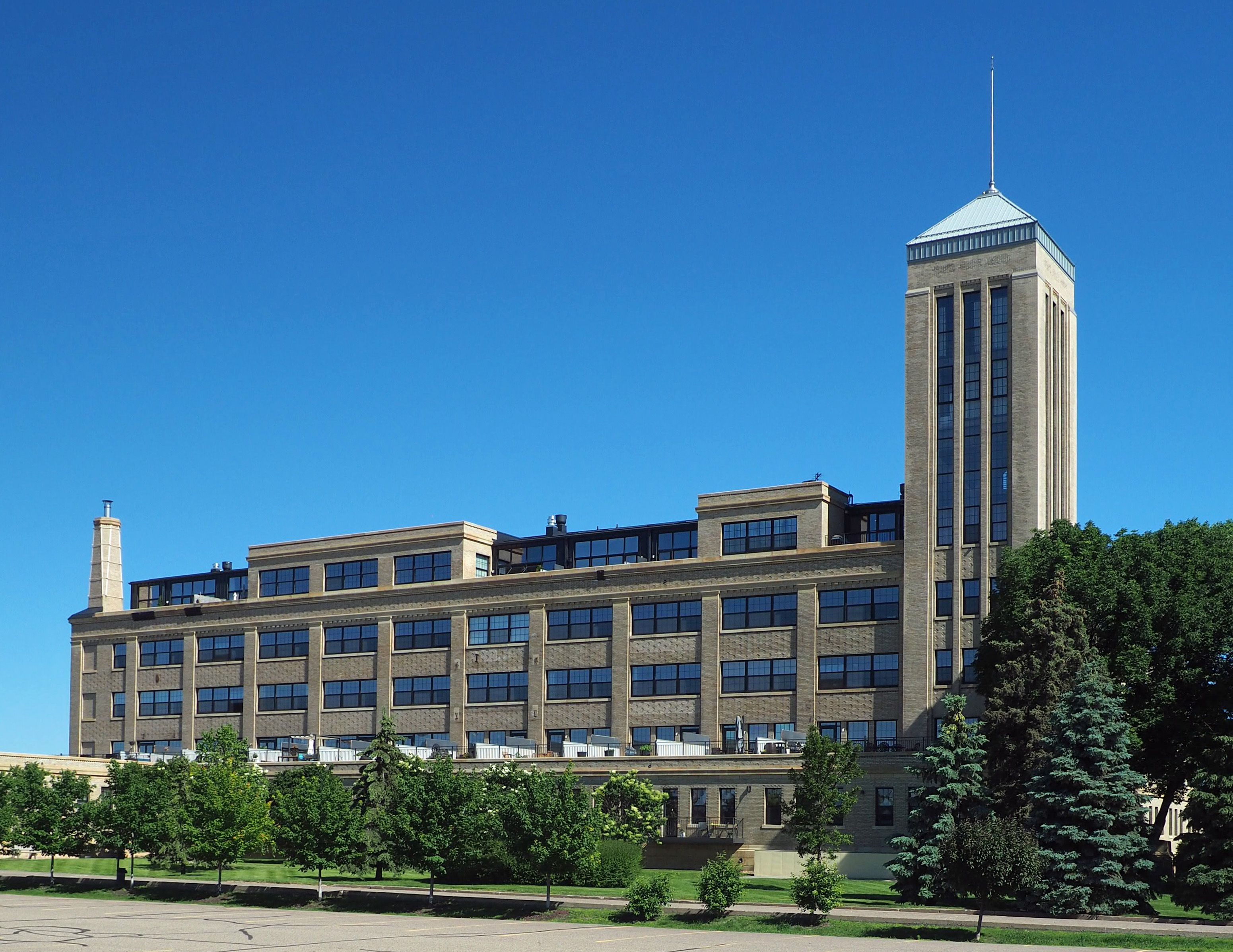
Cream of Wheat building, 2024

The area features the historically designated Cream of Wheat building on 730 Stinson Boulevard NE that was constructed in 1928.

In the 1960s a gravel pit closed and construction of interstate highways changed the area’s character.

=== 21st century ===
The neighborhood primarily features industrial and commercial uses, but also includes breweries, lounges, and some residences. The area has high levels of formaldehyde contamination and of other industrial pollutants. Future plans for the area would improve linkages with the Grand Rounds trail system. The Diagonal Trail intersects the neighborhood.

== Demographics ==
Though Mid-City Industrial is primarily industrial and was not designed for residential use, the neighborhood has a small population of residents. The neighborhood's population has increased in the 21st century with residential conversions of former industrial structures.

Race/ethnicity
Race/ethnicity	2000		2010		2020	
Race/ethnicity	Number	%	Number	%	Number	%
White alone	13	86.67	189	88.73	212	76.81
Black alone	2	13.33	5	2.35	15	5.43
Hispanic or Latino (any race)	0	0.00	5	2.35	17	6.16
Native American alone	0	0.00	0	0.00	4	1.45
Asian alone	0	0.00	14	6.57	9	3.26
Other race alone	0	0.00	0	0.00	4	1.45
Pacific Islander alone	0	0.00	0	0.00	0	0.00
Two or more races	0	0.00	0	0.00	15	5.43
Total	15	100.0	213	100.0	276	100.0

== See also ==
- History of Minneapolis
- Honeywell
