= University, Minneapolis =

Community of Minneapolis

University
- Community
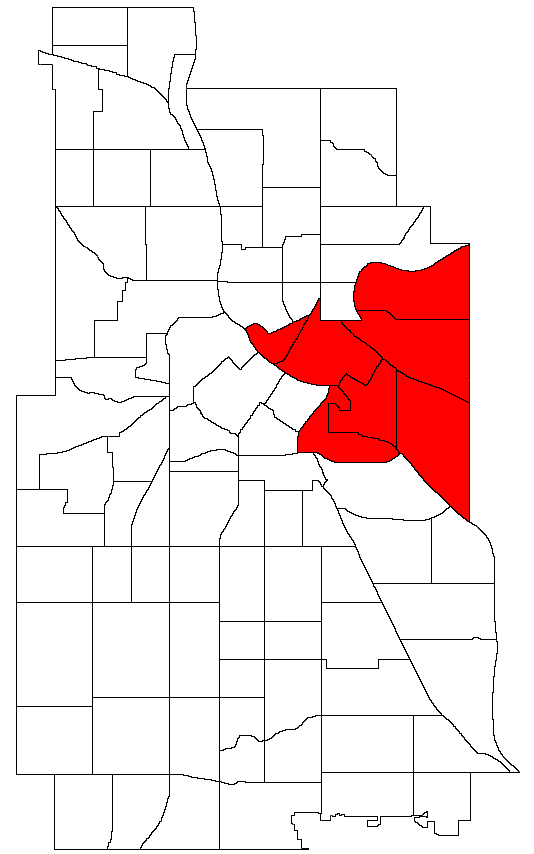
- Location of University within the U.S. city of Minneapolis
- Interactive map of University
- Coordinates: 44°59′0″N 93°14′0″W
- Country: United States
- State: Minnesota
- County: Hennepin
- City: Minneapolis
- Founded: 1849
- City Council wards: 1, 2, 3, 6
- Neighborhoods: List: Cedar-Riverside; Como; Marcy-Holmes; Mid-City Industrial; Nicollet Island/East Bank; Prospect Park; University

Government
  - Council members: Elliott Payne, Robin Wonsley, Michael Rainville, Jamal Osman
  - State senators: Bobby Joe Champion, Doron Clark
  - State representatives: Esther Agbaje, Mohamud Noor, Sydney Jordan

Area
  - Total: 5.714 sq mi (14.80 km^{2})

Population (2020)
  - Total: 51,922
  - Density: 9,087/sq mi (3,508/km^{2})
- Time zone: UTC-6 (CST)
  - Summer (DST): UTC-5 (CDT)
- ZIP code: 55401, 55413, 55414, 55454, 55455
- Area code: 612

Historical population
Census	Pop.	Note	%±
1980	29,818		—
1990	30,464		2.2%
2000	33,440		9.8%
2010	38,785		16.0%
2020	51,922		33.9%

University is one of the eleven official communities of the U.S. city of Minneapolis, Minnesota. It is composed of seven smaller neighborhoods and is the only community with neighborhoods on both sides of the Mississippi River. The University community contains the East Bank and West Bank campuses of the University of Minnesota Twin Cities, for which it is named, as well as the campus of Augsburg University. The portions of the community east of the Mississippi River are often referred to as Southeast Minneapolis, as most street names in these neighborhoods have the SE suffix.

The University community contains most of Minneapolis City Council Ward 2, currently represented by Robin Wonsley. It also contains portions of Wards 1, 3, and 6, represented by Elliott Payne, Michael Rainville, and Jamal Osman, respectively. In the Minnesota Legislature, it contains District 60B and parts of Districts 59B and 60A.

== Official neighborhoods ==
- Cedar-Riverside, also known as the West Bank
- Como
- Marcy-Holmes, a neighborhood containing an area more commonly known as Dinkytown.
- Mid-City Industrial
- Nicollet Island/East Bank
- Prospect Park-East River Road
- University
