= Nicollet Island/East Bank, Minneapolis =

Coordinates: 44°59′10″N 93°15′26″W

Nicollet Island/East Bank
- Neighborhood
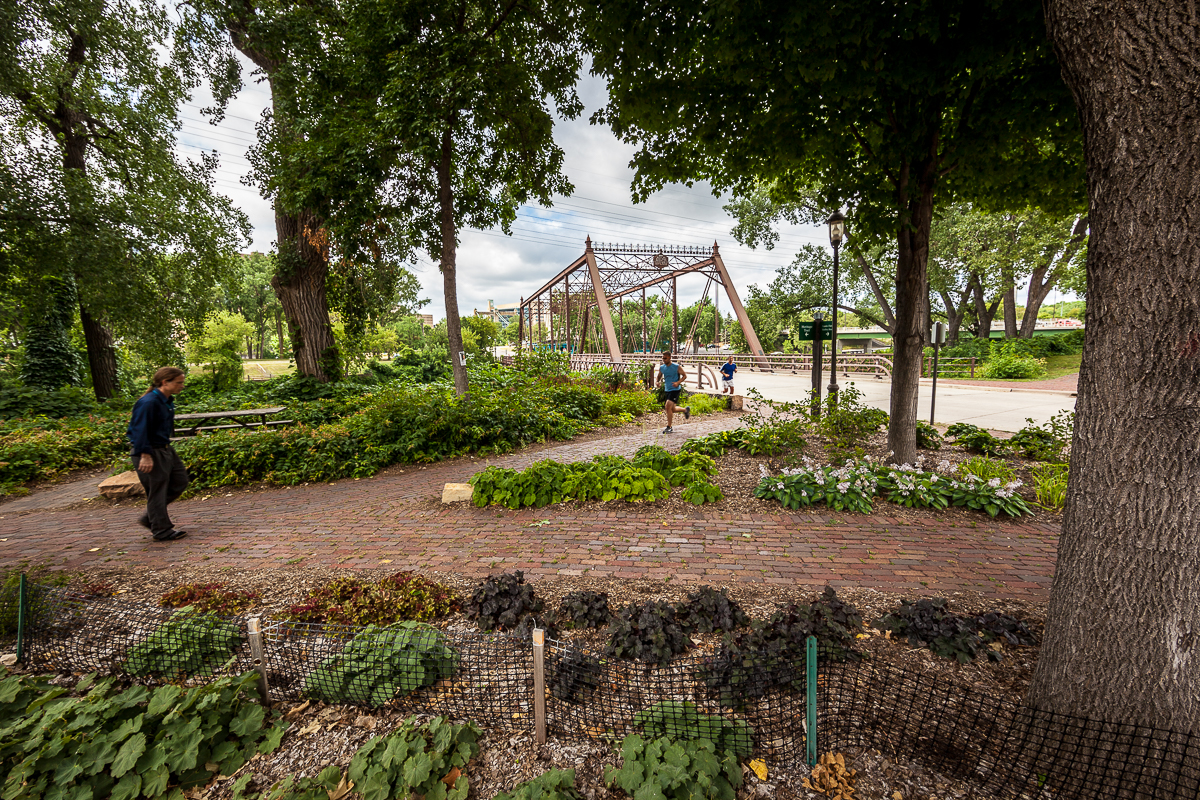
- Merriam Street Bridge - showing one of the many areas in the Nicollet Island - East Bank Neighborhood of Minneapolis
- Nickname: Old Saint Anthony
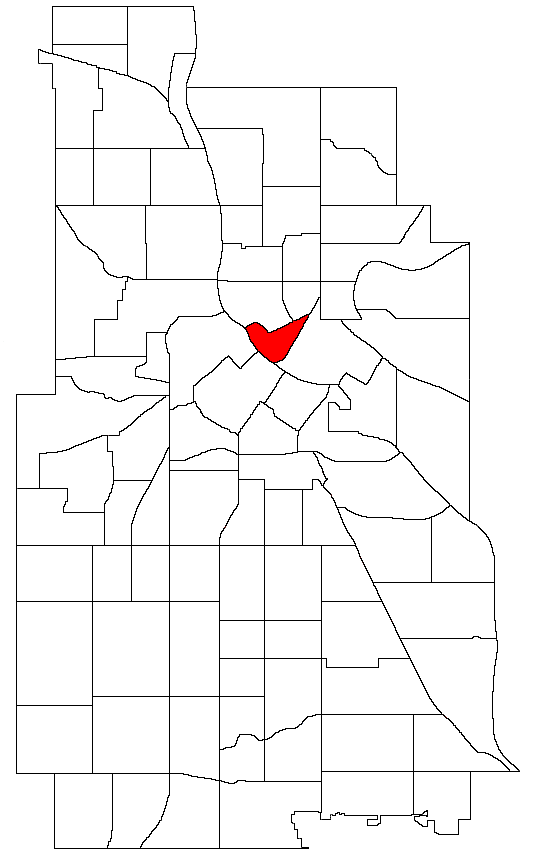
- Location of Nicollet Island/East Bank within the U.S. city of Minneapolis
- Interactive map of Nicollet Island/East Bank
- Country: United States
- State: Minnesota
- County: Hennepin
- City: Minneapolis
- Community: University
- Established: 1849
- City Council Ward: 3

Government
  - Council Member: Michael Rainville

Area
  - Total: 0.251 sq mi (0.65 km^{2})
  - Land: 0.192 sq mi (0.50 km^{2})
  - Water: 0.059 sq mi (0.15 km^{2})

Population (2020)
  - Total: 2,439
  - Density: 12,700/sq mi (4,900/km^{2})
- Time zone: UTC-6 (CST)
  - Summer (DST): UTC-5 (CDT)
- ZIP code: 55401, 55413, 55414
- Area code: 612

Historical population
Census	Pop.	Note	%±
1980	203		—
1990	666		228.1%
2000	828		24.3%
2010	1,309		58.1%
2020	2,439		86.3%

Nicollet Island/East Bank (/ˈnɪkəlɪt/ NIH-kə-lit) is a neighborhood in the University community of Minneapolis. It is a part of Minneapolis City Council ward 3, represented by Michael Rainville, and state legislative district 59B.

The neighborhood, one of seven in the University community, is situated just across the Mississippi River from Downtown Minneapolis. It comprises Nicollet Island and the portion of the eastern riverbank located between Central Avenue and the BNSF Railway line. The "East Bank" portion of the neighborhood is commonly referred to as a part of Northeast or Old St. Anthony, as this area was the location of the town of St. Anthony, which was annexed by Minneapolis in 1872.

East Hennepin Avenue runs through the middle of the neighborhood, which means it is situated in parts of both Northeast and Southeast Minneapolis. The neighborhood is bounded by Central Avenue, 2nd Avenue NE, and the river. Due to its proximity to Downtown, the area has seen a wave of gentrification in recent years; with shopping complexes and upscale condominiums built in the area. The area is home to DeLaSalle High School on Nicollet Island.

== Demographics ==
Race/ethnicity
Race/ethnicity	2000		2010		2020	
Race/ethnicity	Number	%	Number	%	Number	%
White alone	704	85.02	1,099	83.96	1,928	85.27
Black alone	39	4.71	69	5.27	71	3.14
Hispanic or Latino (any race)	16	1.93	48	3.67	60	2.65
Native American alone	5	0.60	5	0.38	2	0.09
Asian alone	53	6.40	55	4.20	104	4.60
Other race alone	0	0.00	3	0.23	10	0.44
Pacific Islander alone	0	0.00	0	0.00	0	0.00
Two or more races	11	1.33	30	2.29	86	3.80
Total	828	100.0	1,309	100.0	2,261	100.0
