= University (neighborhood), Minneapolis =

Coordinates: 44.9778°N 93.2257°W

University
- Neighborhood
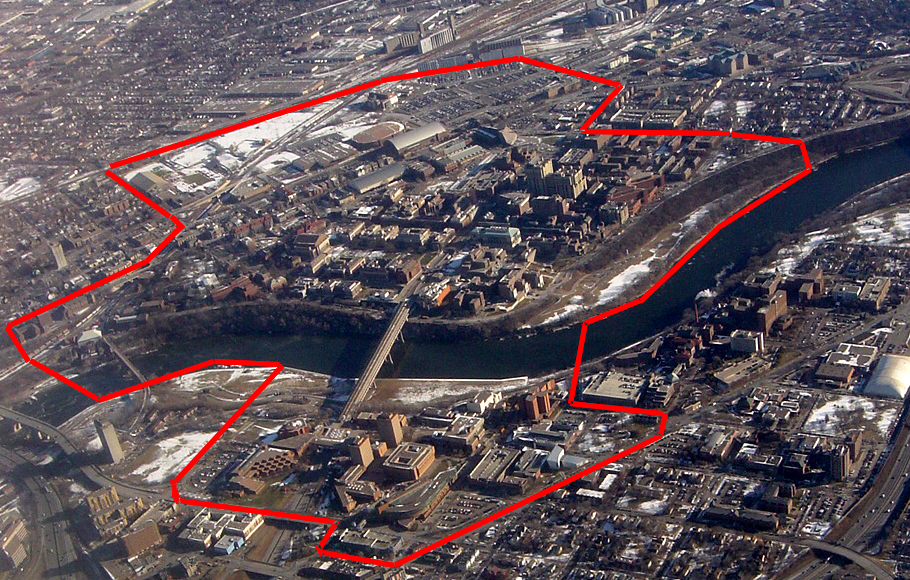
- The University of Minnesota's Minneapolis campus, whose borders largely coincide with those of the neighborhood

- Location of University within the U.S. city of Minneapolis
- Interactive map of University
- Country: United States
- State: Minnesota
- County: Hennepin
- City: Minneapolis
- Community: University
- City Council Ward: 2

Government
  - Council Member: Robin Wonsley

Area
  - Total: 0.668 sq mi (1.73 km^{2})

Population (2020)
  - Total: 7,090
  - Density: 10,600/sq mi (4,100/km^{2})
- Time zone: UTC-6 (CST)
  - Summer (DST): UTC-5 (CDT)
- ZIP code: 55414, 55454, 55455
- Area code: 612

Historical population
Census	Pop.	Note	%±
1980	4,194		—
1990	3,880		−7.5%
2000	4,026		3.8%
2010	5,421		34.6%
2020	7,090		30.8%

University is a neighborhood within the greater University community in Minneapolis, Minnesota. It is almost completely occupied by the Minneapolis campus of the University of Minnesota, hence the name. It is located entirely within Minneapolis City Council ward 2 and state legislative district 60B.

The Mississippi River divides it into two, making it the only official neighborhood in Minneapolis that occupies both sides of the river. On the west bank, the neighborhood is bound by 1st Street on the north, 19th Avenue on the west, 4th Street on the south, and the river to the east. On the east bank, it is bound by the river to the west and south and Oak Street to the east; the northern boundary, going from west to east, is along 11th Avenue, University Avenue, 15th Avenue, and the railroad tracks near 8th Street.

== Demographics ==
Race/ethnicity
Race/ethnicity	2000		2010		2020	
Race/ethnicity	Number	%	Number	%	Number	%
White alone	3,485	86.56	4,434	81.79	4,875	70.29
Black alone	130	3.23	158	2.91	362	5.22
Hispanic or Latino (any race)	98	2.43	129	2.38	418	6.03
Native American alone	8	0.20	13	0.24	19	0.27
Asian alone	215	5.34	517	9.54	993	14.32
Other race alone	5	0.12	10	0.18	2	0.03
Pacific Islander alone	1	0.02	2	0.04	0	0.00
Two or more races	84	2.09	158	2.91	267	3.85
Total	4,026	100.0	5,421	100.0	6,936	100.0
