= Waconia City Hall =

Waconia City Hall is located at 201 South Vine Street in Waconia, Minnesota, United States. The contemporary building was completed in 2004, and replaced the Old Waconia City Hall, a historic building constructed in 1909 that has been converted into senior housing.

== Old Waconia City Hall ==
- Waconia City Hall
- U.S. National Register of Historic Places
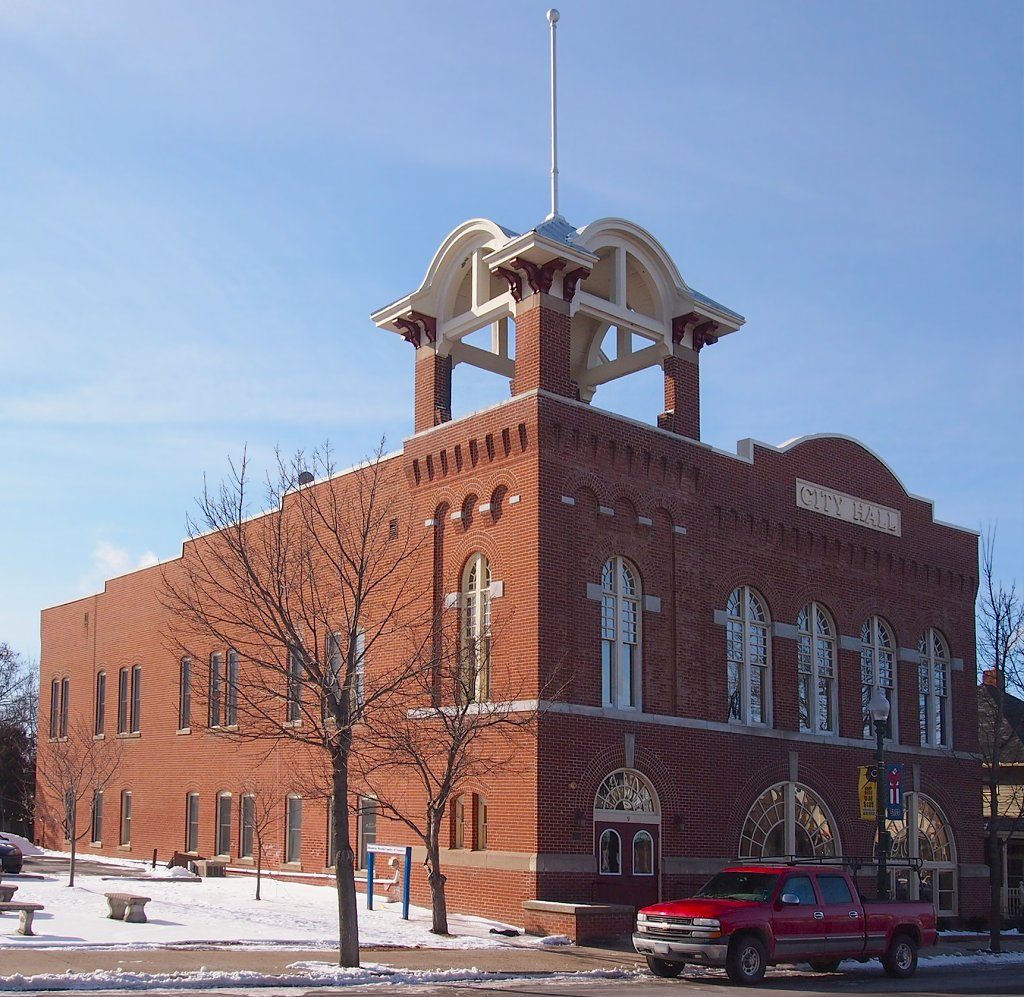
- Old Waconia City Hall building in 2013

- Location within Minnesota Location within the United States
- Location: 9 W. 1st St., Waconia, Minnesota
- Coordinates: 44°50′57″N 93°47′11″W
- Area: less than one acre
- Built: 1909
- Built by: Osterfeld & Wortmann
- Architect: Charles Sedgwick
- NRHP reference No.: 83000900
- Added to NRHP: May 9, 1983

The Old Waconia City Hall at 9 West 1st Street is now Old City Hall Apartments, a senior housing facility. It was design by Charles Sumner Sedgwick and built in 1909. The building was nominated and listed on the National Register of Historic Places as "Waconia City Hall" in 1983. The renovation of Old City Hall for the construction of a 13 unit elderly Housing Project began in 1984.

It is a two-story red brick building, 50 by 100 feet (15 m × 30 m) in plan.
