= James T. Elwell =

Prominent Minnesotan developer, legislator, parks funding architect

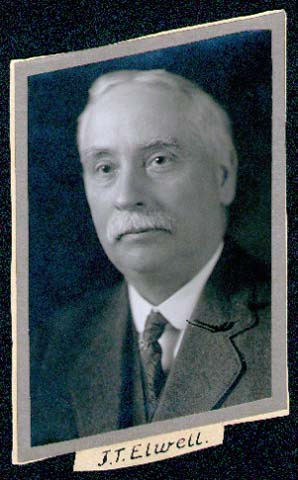
Portrait of James T. Elwell

James Tallmadge Elwell (July 2, 1855 – August 1933) was a Minneapolis, Minnesota real estate developer and state legislator. He founded and developed the Como neighborhood in Minneapolis, where the Como Congregational Church and the Tuttle School are historic structures of the period. Later in his career, he played a major role in the public financing of the Minneapolis park system, the expansion of the University of Minnesota campus, and served as president of the Minneapolis Planning Commission.

== Early life ==
James T. Elwell was born on July 2, 1855 in St. Anthony (later Minneapolis), Minnesota, the oldest of eight children, to Margaret (née Miller) and Talmadge Elwell. He was educated in his early years in Cottage Grove, and grew up in Washington County. The family later moved to Morrison County. During the Dakota War of 1862, the family left for Fort Ripley. They later moved to Minneapolis. He began attending a preparatory school (later Carleton College) in 1877. He quit school to enter business.

== Career ==
After some early success as an inventor and manufacturer, Elwell turned to real estate and city development in the 1880s. The Elwell Additions to Minneapolis, known as the Como neighborhood, were notable in the number of houses Elwell constructed and for the beauty of its elm-lined streets that he planted. For this real estate development, he applied his gift for practical invention to devise effective drainage of marshy areas into buildable residential lots. Elwell participated actively in community life, seeking a park, improved streetcar service, and other amenities for the area through Como Improvement Association activity centered at the Como Congregational Church. In line with his intentions, the neighborhood had a notable demographic blend of blue-collar residents (often associated with the adjacent railroad and milling industries on the main lines between St. Paul and Minneapolis), white-collar office professionals, and faculty and staff of the adjacent University of Minnesota. The neighborhood and its founding represent the industrial expansion period in the U.S. After a period developing farming and dairying enterprises in nearby Anoka county, he resided in Como near Van Cleve Park until his death in 1933.

=== Legislator ===
Elwell as a state legislator succeeded in providing an important funding mechanism for the city to fund the acquisition of parks, parkways and other elements of the proposed Minneapolis park system. This 1911 "Elwell Law" was recognized by Minneapolis park superintendent Theodore Wirth as the key tool for parks funding and acquisition, during the period when the Minneapolis park system tripled in size and realized the grand vision of early planners such as Horace Cleveland. Writing in a 1946 survey of his career, Wirth acknowledged Elwell's instrumental role: "Let us now give special attention to the period 1911 to 1930, during which time the park system of the city was really perfected […] Prior to 1911, there was no special assessment law permitting the assessments for improvements to park lands. The passage of the so-called Elwell Law [1911] provided that authority." Along with its designers and superintendents, Elwell as a public financing architect played a key role in creating one of the leading city park systems in the U.S.

As a state legislator representing the University of Minnesota campus, Elwell was responsible for funding appropriations providing the significant expansion of the campus, from the original Knoll area southward, as envisaged by a Cass Gilbert plan. Elwell's legislative efforts doubled the size of the main University campus on the east bank of the Mississippi, and enabled the construction of the Northrop Mall as the centerpiece of the campus.

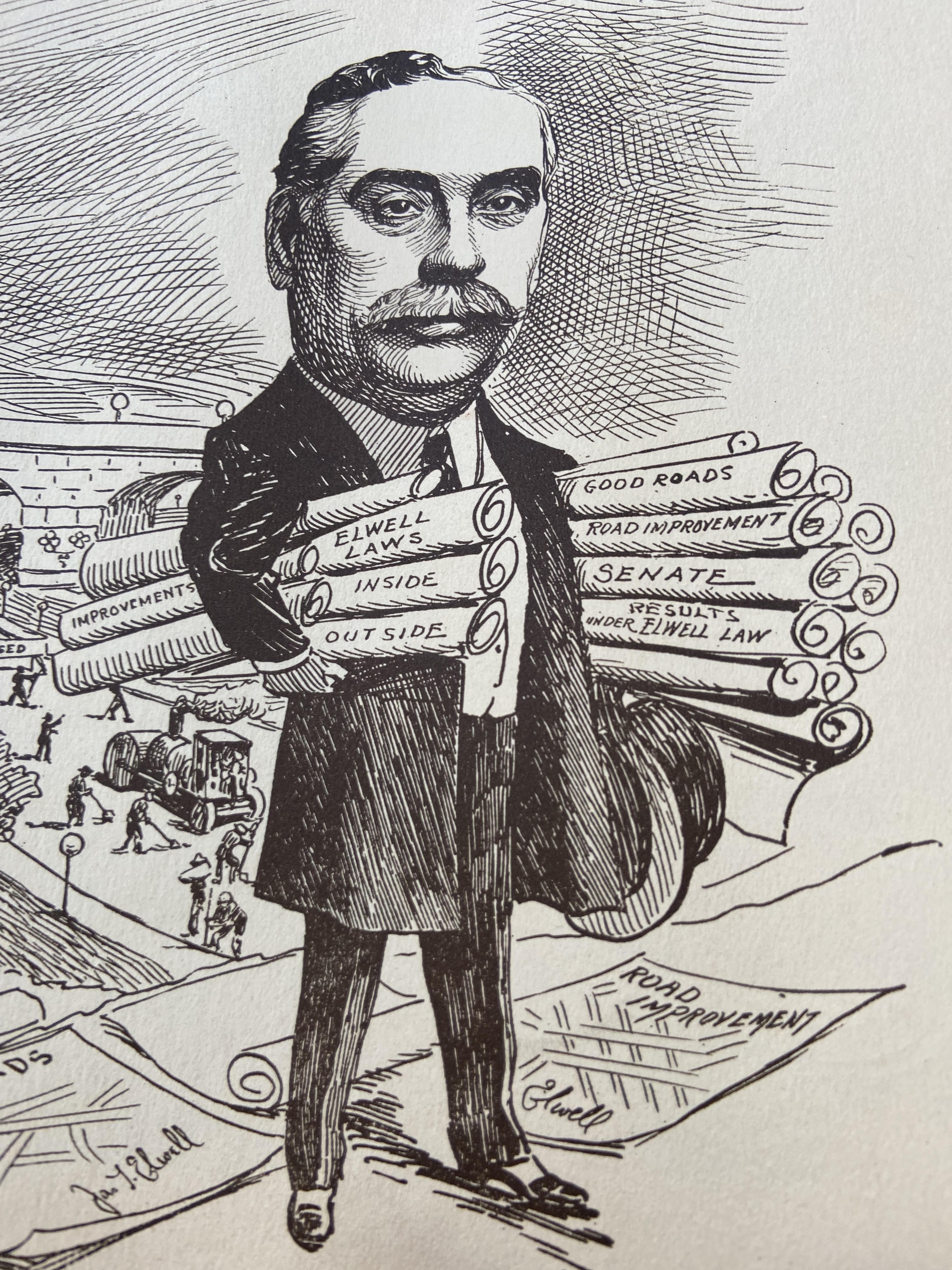
A 1915 cartoon showing Elwell with his achievements

He also supported legislation to begin construction of the state's trunk highway system. Aside from the park system, the city of Minneapolis applied the Elwell Law to other public works projects through a period when the city doubled in population. The Minneapolis Star eulogized Elwell's role in creating the public financing "under which the major share of Minneapolis' expansions and improvements have been carried out for 20 years," and that "scores of projects, which have marked the development of Minneapolis and the state, bear witness to his ambition, persistence and keen intellect."

== Personal life ==
Elwell married Lizzie A. Alden on June 28, 1882. They had four sons and four daughters, James T. Jr., Edwin S., Laurance R., Watson R., Mrs. George E. Cook, Mrs. Howard N. Weigel, Mrs. Theodore E. Ford and Mary I.

Elwell died on August 10, 1933, at his 14th Avenue SE home in Minneapolis. He was buried in Lakewood Cemetery.
