= Como Congregational Church =

Historic church building in Minneapolis, Minnesota

Coordinates: 44°59′20.5″N 93°13′56.5″W

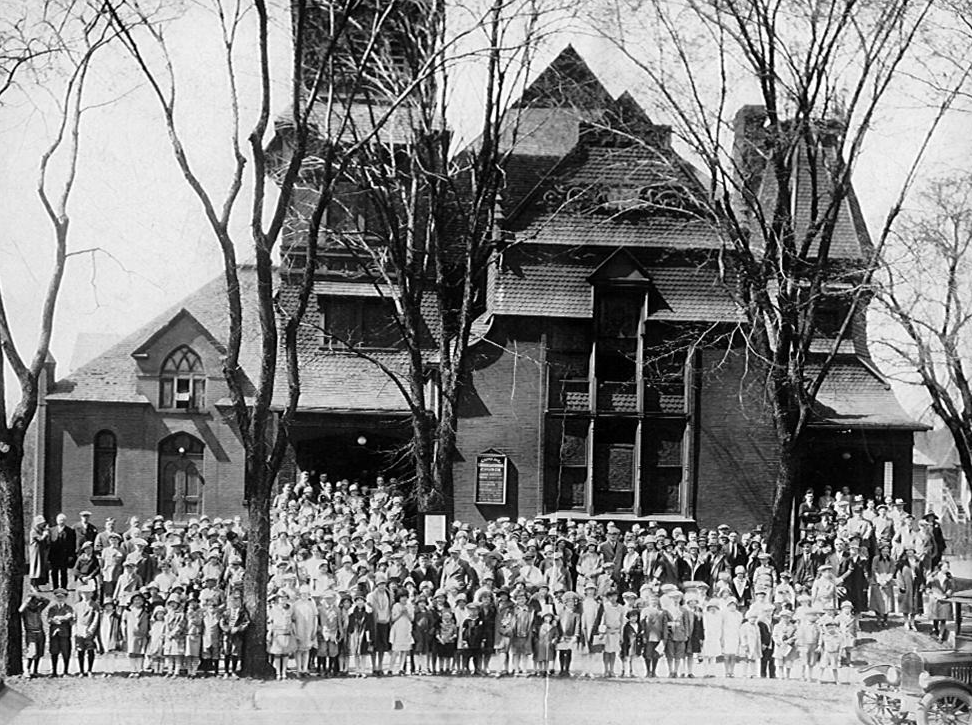
Historic photo of Como Congregational Church

The Como Congregational Church is a historic church building in the Como neighborhood of Minneapolis, Minnesota. Opened in 1887 and designed by architect Charles Sumner Sedgwick, a Minneapolis master architect, the church is an example of eclectic Queen Anne style architecture. During its first four decades, the church building is strongly associated with two major Minneapolis and Minnesota historic figures:

- Maria Sanford, a noted social reformer, speaker and public affairs activist
- James Elwell, the civic leader, and the public financier associated with the Minneapolis Park System.

Como Congregational was Sanford's place of worship (and adjacent to her home), who as a church leader spoke at its pulpit and community meetings with her advocacy of civic reform and Progressive causes.^{[Note 1]} Construction of the building was primarily funded by Elwell, who had founded the surrounding Como neighborhood in 1882, with the intention that the building serve both as an open place of worship and as a community center. Elwell was subsequently active in Como neighborhood and wider social concerns through the church and through the Como Improvement Association (founded by Elwell, based at the Congregational) for the next decades. The building was determined as a Minneapolis historic resource in March 2020.

== The historic Congregational building and preservation ==
The Minneapolis Tribune 1887 inauguration article gives an unusually precise and extensive description of the new building.

Externally the church is of unusually attractive appearance, and the interior is a model of simple beauty. The building is about 45x70 feet in dimensions, built of red pressed brick to the top of the windows and shingled above. In general shape it resembles the form of a Latin cross. It has two towers, the one on the left over the main entrance square and carried up to the height of 90 feet. On the right hand side is a small square tower in form, carried up to a height of 20 feet, and above this finished in octagonal form to a height of about 40 feet. Entering the building by either of the front entrances and passing through small square vestibules the main auditorium is reached. It is about 45x66 feet, has a descending floor and seats about 400 people in the regular pews. The pulpit and choir gallery stand in an alcove, on either side of which are small rooms for library and pastor's study. The roof of the building is carried by two large trusses and the ceiling is arched and finished with four large trusses or brackets starting from small dwarfed columns and finished at the top with carved drops or bosses, from which are suspended four large reflectors. The height from floor to ceiling is 24 feet. The central portion of the ceiling is carried up to an additional height of three feet and is finished with paneled timber work. The whole is frescoed in a modest but very artistic style by Arnold, of this city. The colors are harmonious and restful to the eye and put on with excellent taste. Among the visitors yesterday nothing but praise of the beauty of the edifice was heard. At the rear of the auditorium, between the entrances, is a parlor or prayer meeting room, which can be thrown open to increase the size of the auditorium if necessary. Above this is a small gallery, and beneath in the basement is a room designed for kitchen purposes. The pews and woodwork about the pulpit are of oak, while the work about the windows and doors is colored in harmony with the frescoing. The windows are of neat but inexpensive styles of stained glass and were supplied by Brown & Haywood of this city. The building is warmed by furnaces. The designer and architect of this very comely structure is Mr. C. S. Sedgwick.

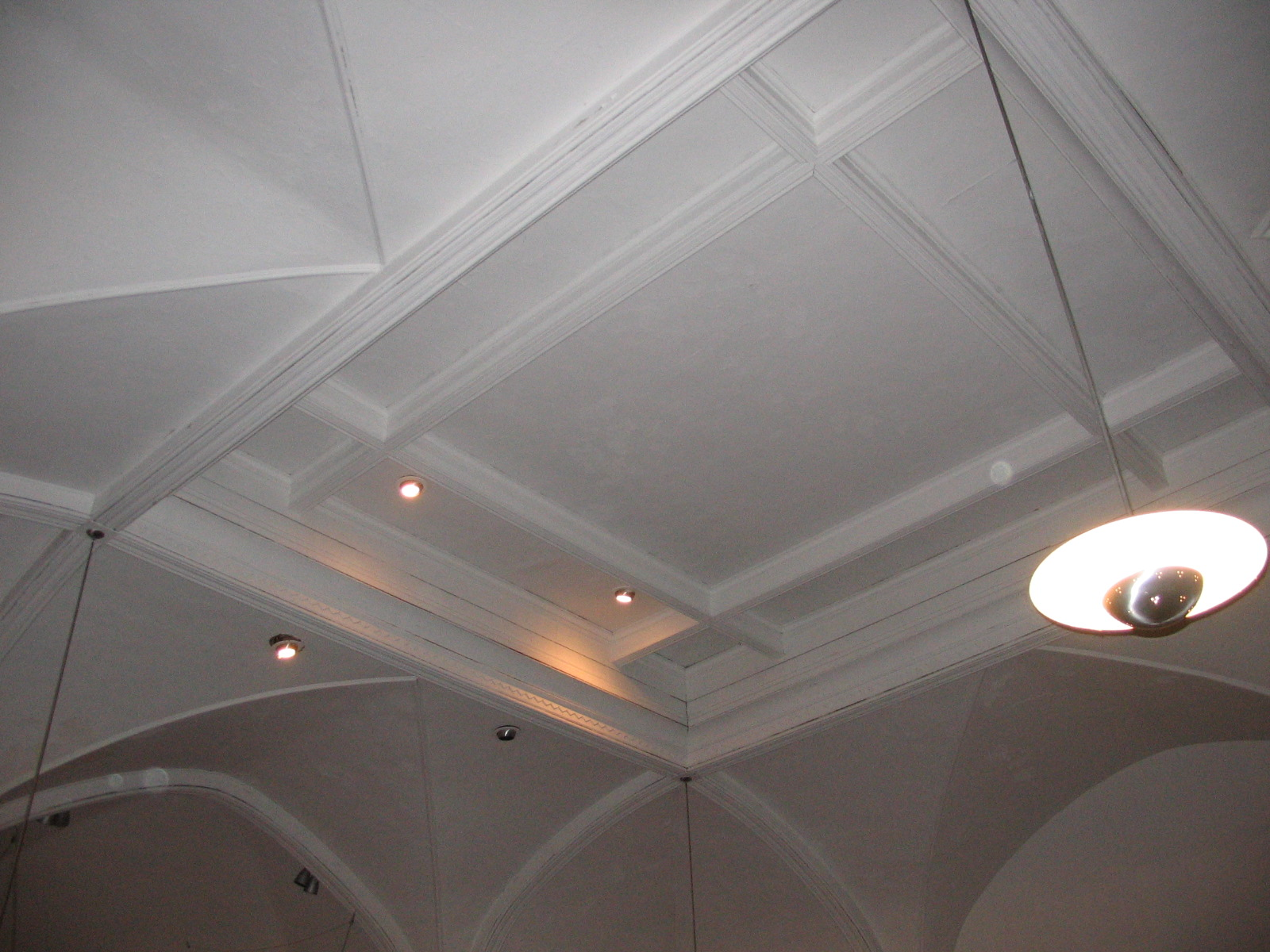
Detail of the vaulted ceiling of the Como Congregational

Many of these historic architectural features (interior auditorium ceiling and wall decor with raked floor and original pew seating, exterior facade configuration) are extant in the building, and a 2022 project is in process of preservation and restoration so the building can represent and interpret the social history of the Como neighborhood and the building's Progressive Era historical period activity through 1920.

== Como Congregational and the Progressive Era ==
The Como neighborhood, with its founding, mill and rail industry-adjacent locale and immigrant demographics, all represent the industrial expansion period in the U.S. During this time, Como Congregational was a notable public activities site for many causes and issues that define the Progressive Era social scene during the 1890s to 1920 time span: citizen participation and suffrage, reform of civic corruption. public health and food safety (water, dairy), labor reform, children's and family welfare and education (including temperance), and city beautification.

During this period, Elwell and Sanford animated and addressed many events and campaigns based at the building, making the building a social issues forum for audiences in the Como neighborhood and city of Minneapolis. Elwell and Sanford spoke personally at Como Congregational public events on their issues, and also advocated by way of organizations that they led such as the Como Improvement Association and the Minneapolis Improvement League.

- 1889. Reverend George Paddock gives a series of sermons on Minneapolis workingmen and conditions.
- 1890. Sanford speaks on temperance and the WCTU at Como Congregational, with her themes of protection of family and children.
- 1894. Maria Sanford delivers a first "sensational sermon" (St. Paul Daily Globe) insisting on the linkage between religious ideals and civic reform, an ongoing theme in Sanford's public campaigning at a time of notable corruption in Minneapolis city government and public scandal (such as the Ames administration).
- 1898. During a financial crisis for Minneapolis public schools, the church hosts a speaking and fundraising meeting as part of a citywide response.
- 1906. Fisk University faculty member and fundraiser Frances Yeomans makes a Sunday speech at the church on the goals and activities of Fisk, an HBCU in Nashville. Sanford, in her church leadership role and as a social issues campaigner, was noted for her support of educational opportunities for Black citizens.

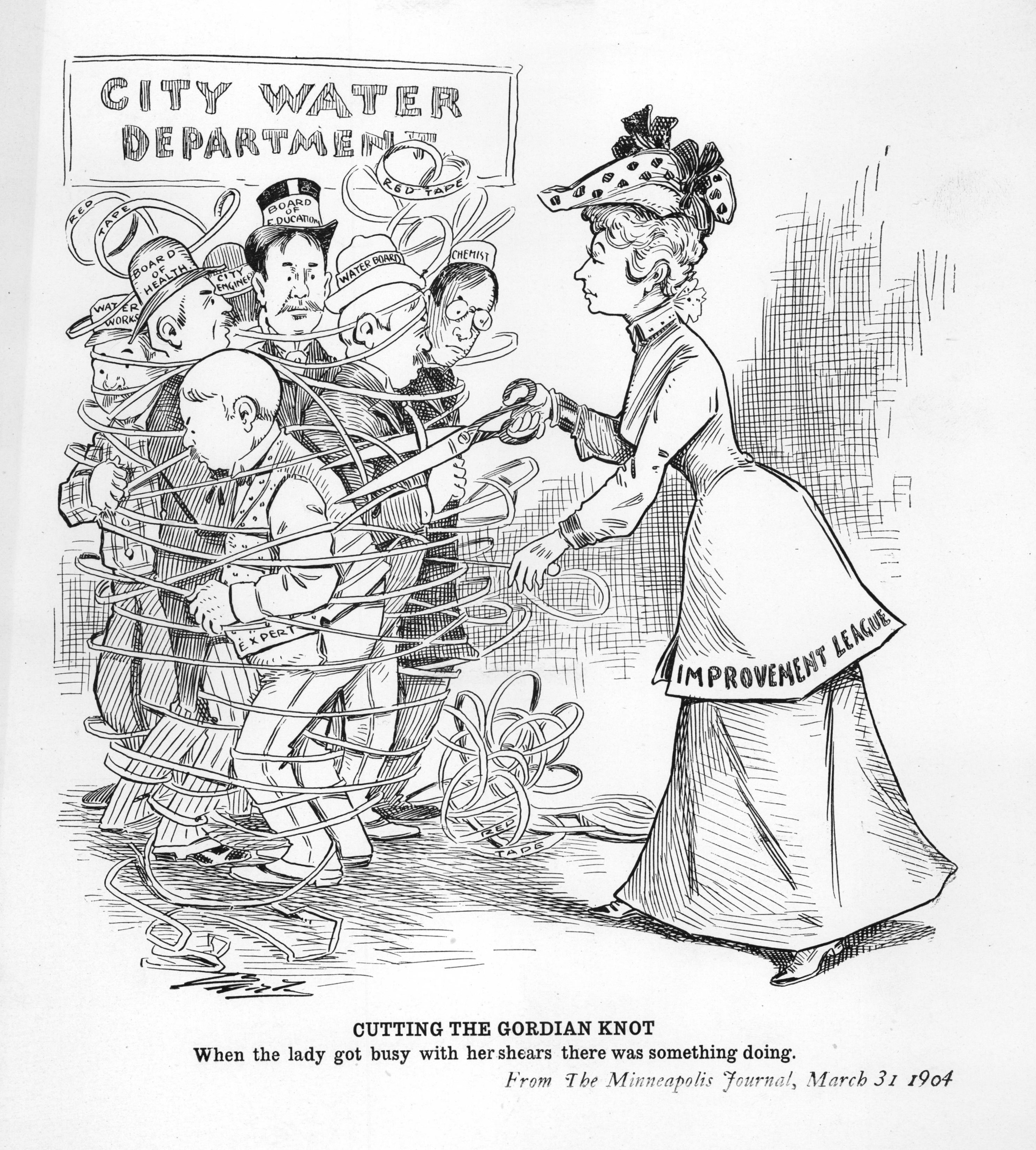
The Minneapolis Improvement League (headed by Maria Sanford) campaigns for clean city water, in a 1904 cartoon (Minneapolis Journal)

- 1909. The Como Improvement Association hosts a sharp public debate at the church by Minneapolis aldermen over city water quality and sources. Safe water and dairy, as a Progressive Era issue, figures during this period when Minneapolis experienced annual typhoid epidemics, along with other waterborne diseases, because of fecal contamination and industrial pollution of city water. Elwell had an interest in these issues, because of Elwell family ownership of the large Elwell (Northland) dairy firm. Clean city water was a leading issue for Sanford and the Minneapolis Improvement League, which Sanford headed during this period.
- 1909. The Como Improvement Association meets at the church and plans a campaign for improved street car service to Como, and improvements to neighborhood streets.
- 1910. Maria Sanford and James Elwell give evening speeches at the church on social and religious issues. Sanford criticizes Jim Crow laws in the South, and similar harmful prejudice for their effects on families. Elwell discussed the relations between labor, capital and government in Mexico.
- 1911. A Sunday service at the church participated in the national “Peace Sunday” event, heralding new international arbitration treaties between the United States and European countries, with a sermon on “The Coming Era of Peace.”

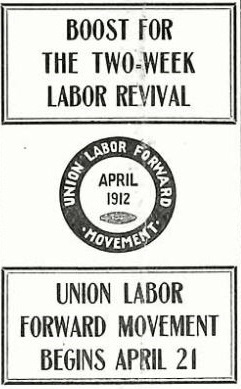
Promotion for the Union Labor Forward Movement, with its kickoff event at Como Congregational in April 1912 (from Minneapolis Labor Review)

- 1912. With a speech on the goals of the labor movement by Lewis Harthill, a leader of the International Association of Machinists union, Como Congregational was the kick-off venue for a two-week series of 15 meetings around Minneapolis on topics such as labor laws, worker organization and unions, child labor, factory safety and sanitation, and workday regulation. Labor issues were in the foreground of Minneapolis politics. In 1917, after the local head of the International Association of Machinists became the first Socialist mayor of Minneapolis, Harthill was appointed Minneapolis police chief to launch police department reform and an organized crime cleanup. Also at that time, Sanford joined the new mayor on the platform in the city to speak about good government and women's suffrage issues.
- 1914. Maria Sanford is noted for a sermon on the responsibility of Christians for improving civic life.
- 1914. A national suffrage leader from Chicago spoke at the church, pointing to suffrage as a way to improve conditions for working women and for children, and celebrating a recent strong election challenge to a notably corrupt Chicago alderman by a woman candidate as an advancement of women's issues and demonstration of the positive value of suffrage. Harriet Vittum, often considered a "second Jane Addams" as an American social reform pioneer, made her appearance at the Congregational as a lead-up to a national suffrage march event.
- 1916. The Como Improvement Association and other area civic and business associations urge the city to pave the major artery streets in the Como neighborhood, a concern driven by the transition to mechanized transportation already significantly affecting city planning and the cityscape.
- 1916. The Como Improvement Association and other associations fundraise to provide sports and other recreation activities to boys at the YMCA branch in a former school building adjacent to the Congregational. This social campaign reflects the changing concept of childhood and adolescence during the Progressive era, a shift to a new ideal of childhood life and development, moving away from workshop instead to school and recreation.
- 1918. The Como Improvement Association, the Southeast Minneapolis YMCA (with Elwell a leader in both), and Van Cleve Park organize “the greatest Fourth of July celebration in the history of Southeast Minneapolis” at the park, at a time when the nation’s first entry into a European war revealed strains between patriotic impulses and loyalty suspicions against German immigrants in Minneapolis and the state.

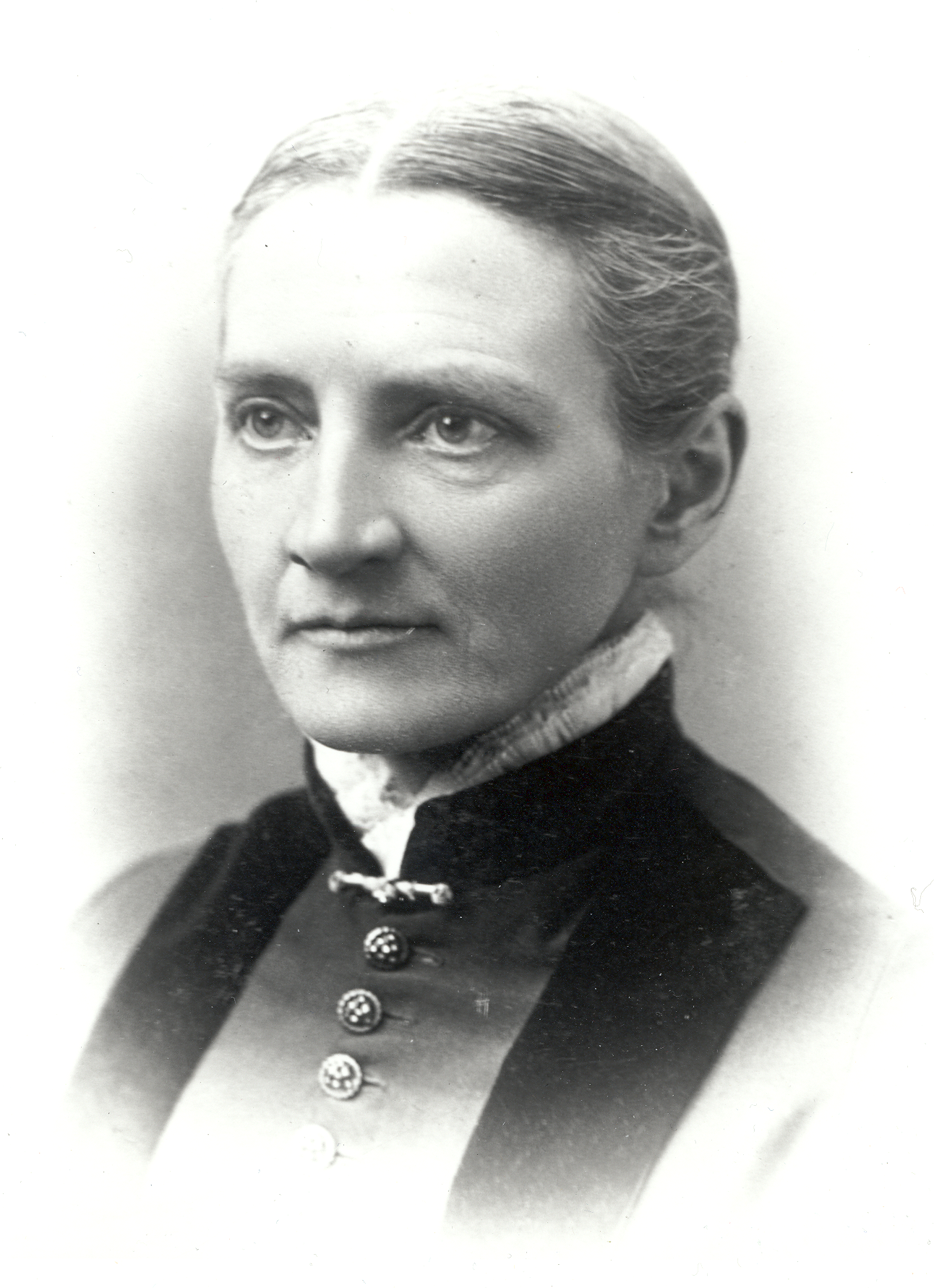
Social reformer and Como Congregational leader Maria Sanford, circa 1880

- 1920. Maria Sanford delivers her final sermons at the church while serving in the pastor’s absence. In her conception of her role as a public figure and speaker, the church in Como was an ongoing base of activity for the causes of reform, conservation, and suffrage. During her life, Sanford was championed as a "trumpet of social reform" in the city and beyond. Como Congregational was the site of one of the memorial gatherings in 1920 where Sanford's wide-ranging stature as a social leader, woman pioneer, progressive reformer and educator were lauded.

== Plans ==
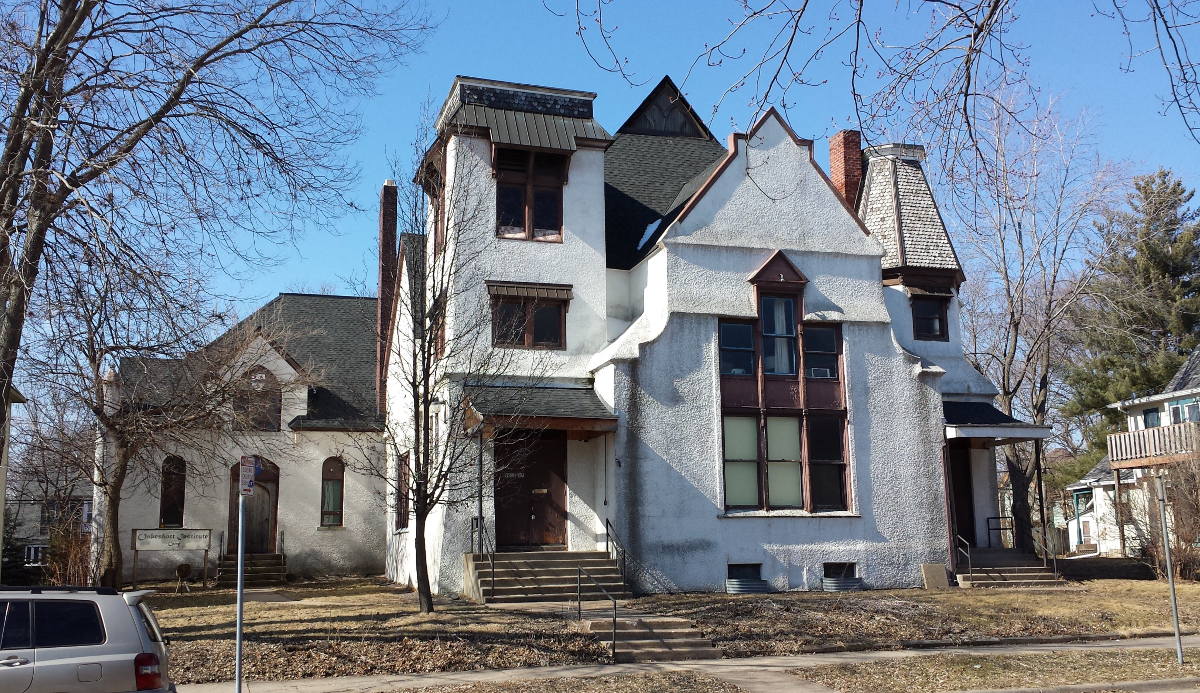
Como Congregational building in 2021

At the end of 2021 plans were put forward to convert the building for mixed use as apartments and a nonprofit community assembly space. The residential portion of the building began operation in September 2022. Historical interpretation about the building's significance is planned for gardens on the building grounds.

== Notes ==
1. The Congregational building was an important base of activity for Maria Sanford. She was a Como Congregational church member for over 35 years; delivered her first address to church members in 1885 on family welfare and temperance; served as chair of the church trustees until 1911 and won acclaim for paying off church debt; served as a member of the church's Prudential Committee (steering, policy); addressed, organized and led scores of social and religious meetings at the building from 1885 to 1920, on her primary topics of concern; and delivered her final series of sermons at the church in place of the ill pastor during early 1920, shortly before her final speaking trip east where she died. (Como Congregational Church files, Minneapolis Tribune and other newspaper reports of her speeches and meeting chair leadership.)
