= Westminster Presbyterian Church (Minneapolis) =

Historic church in Minnesota, United States

- U.S. National Register of Historic Places
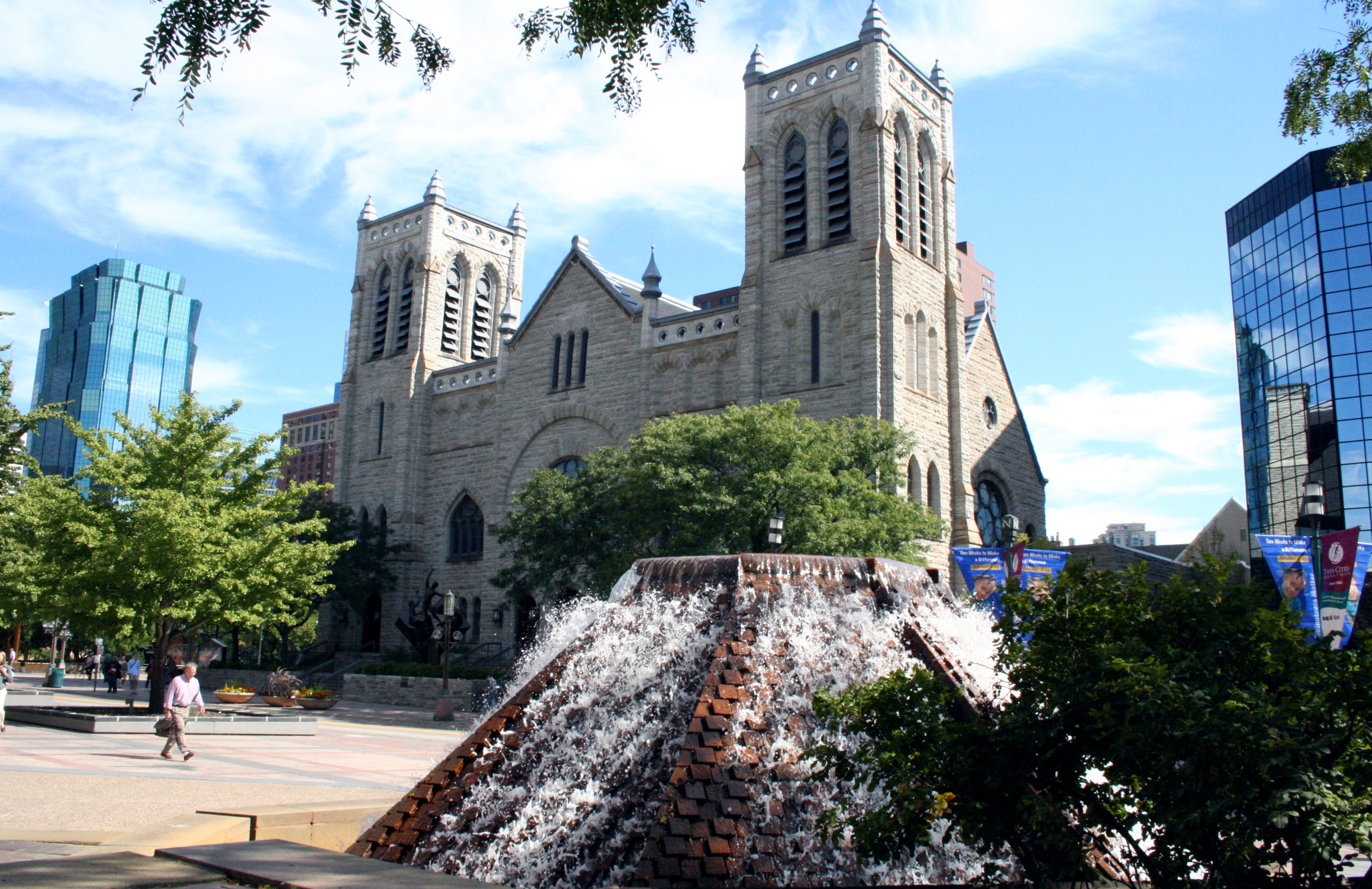
- Location: 1200 Marquette Avenue; Minneapolis, MN 55403
- Coordinates: 44°58′17.91″N 93°16′32.03″W
- Built: 1897
- Architect: Warren Howard Hayes and Charles Sumner Sedgwick
- Architectural style: Romanesque, Gothic
- NRHP reference No.: 98000716
- Added to NRHP: June 26, 1998

Westminster Presbyterian Church is a Presbyterian church located in downtown Minneapolis, Minnesota. Its current location is the third location in downtown in over 140 years. The building is listed on the National Register of Historic Places.

== History ==
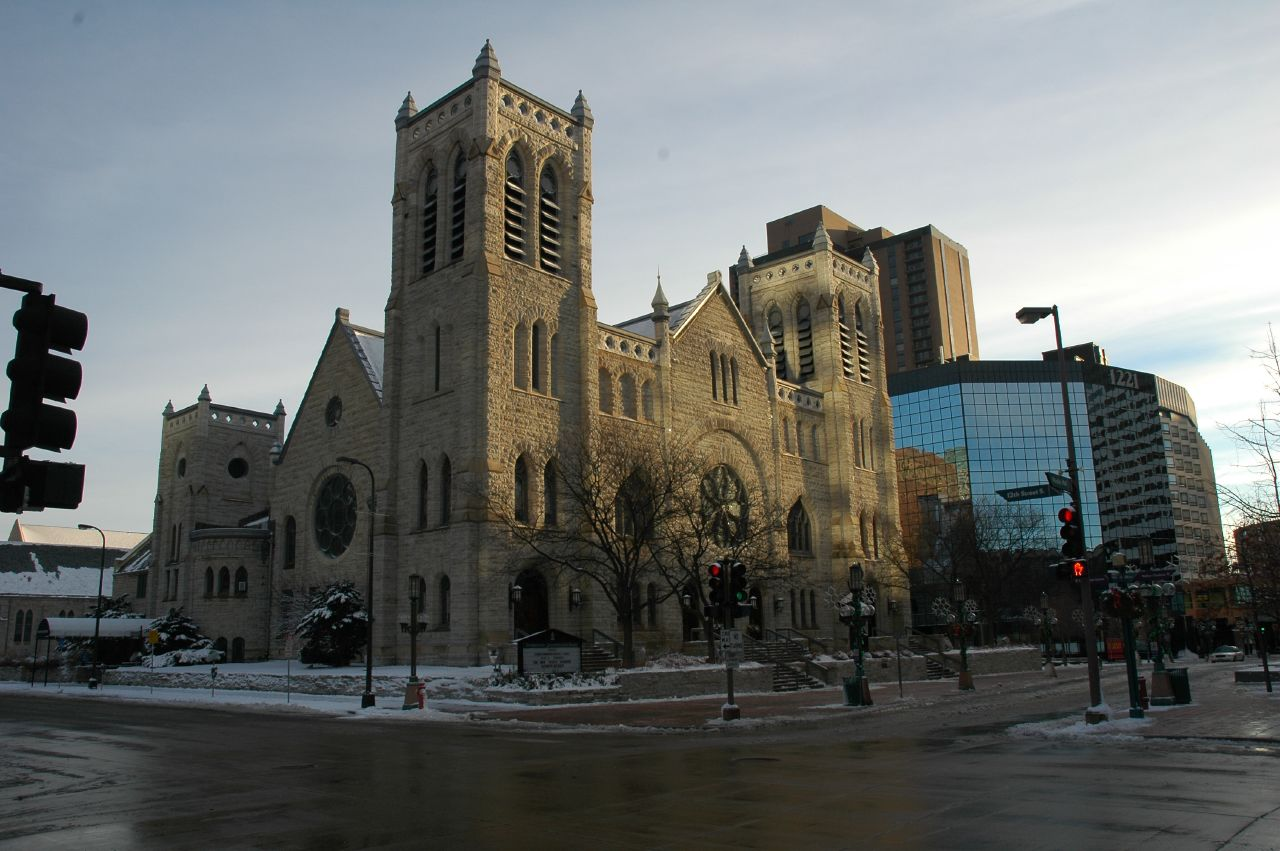
Westminster in winter

Westminster began as a gathering of eight people of Scottish, Irish and Welsh heritage in 1857. In 1860, the congregation built its first church, on Fourth Street between Nicollet and Hennepin Avenues in downtown Minneapolis. Because of the rapid growth of the congregation, the church soon outgrew its first location. In 1883, construction of a new, larger church began at Seventh Street and Nicollet Avenue.

Twelve years after the opening of the second church site, the building was heavily damaged by a fire. This prompted yet another move when the church rebuilt at its current location at Twelfth Street and Nicollet Mall, opening its doors for services in 1897.

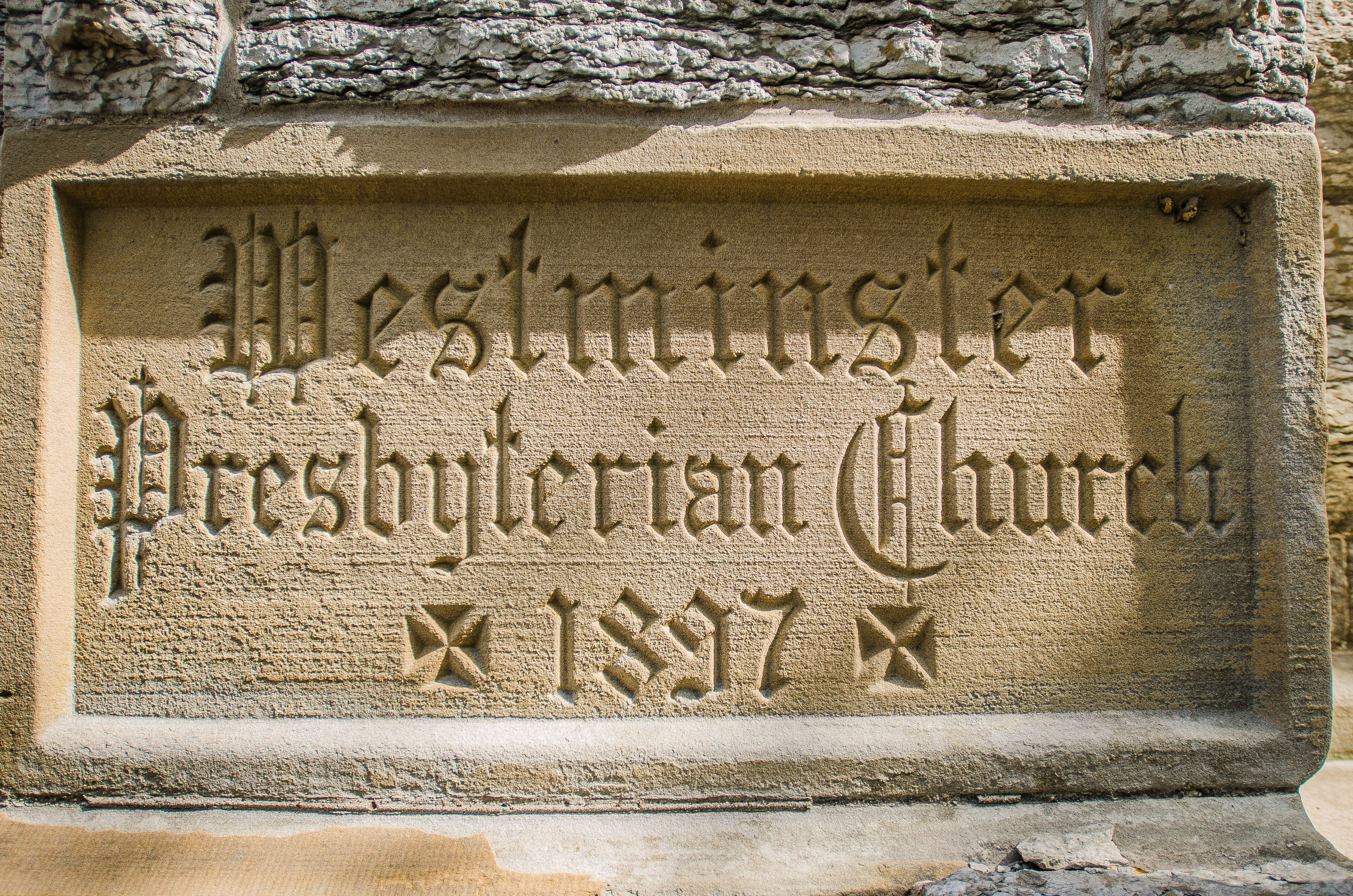
Stone plaque of Westminster Presbyterian Church

The present church was designed as a collaboration between two prominent Minneapolis architects, Warren Howard Hayes and Charles Sumner Sedgwick.

In 1998, to coincide with the building's centennial, the congregation undertook an extensive renovation of the sanctuary. This $3.5 million project restored many original design elements, updated the structure, and improved lighting and sound. The newly renovated sanctuary opened for services on Sunday, December 20, 1998.

== Historical landmark ==
In recognition of its historic and social significance, Westminster was listed on the National Register of Historic Places in 1998. In May 1999, Westminster received the 1999 Heritage Preservation Award from the Minneapolis Heritage Preservation Commission and the Minnesota Chapter of the American Institute of Architects.
