= Newell-Johnson-Searle House =

Historic house in Kansas, United States

- Newell–Johnson–Searle House
- U.S. National Register of Historic Places
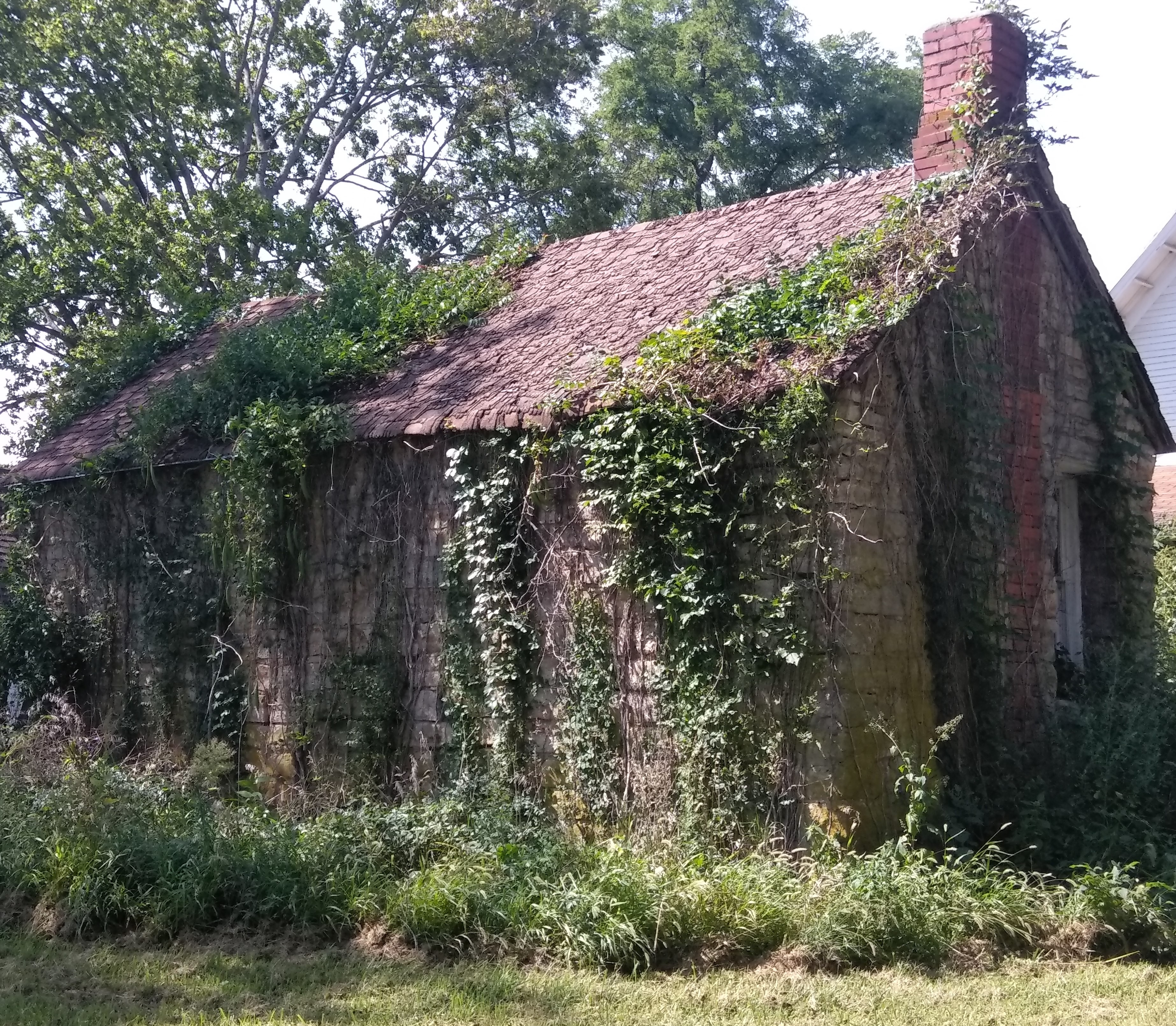
- The stone outbuilding

- Location within Kansas Location within the United States
- Location: 609 Walnut St. Oskaloosa, Kansas
- Coordinates: 39°12′53″N 95°18′38″W
- Area: .47 acres (0.19 ha)
- Built: c.1860, 1877, 1913
- NRHP reference No.: 100001289
- Added to NRHP: July 10, 2017

The Newell–Johnson–Searle House was listed on the National Register of Historic Places in 2017. It is located on U.S. Highway 59 on the edge of Oskaloosa in Jefferson County, Kansas.

The house is a two-and-a-half-story, wood-frame building built and modified in c.1860, 1877 and 1913. The property also includes a contributing one-story stone building with a cellar, and a non-contributing wood-frame garage.

It was deemed significant as one of Oskaloosa's finer early homes, and for its association with Oskaloosa co-founder Newell, who owned it during 1858–1918. Newell arrived in Kansas in 1856, the worst year of the Bleeding Kansas era, and was harassed by pro-slavers.
