= First National Bank (St. Cloud, Minnesota) =

- U.S. National Register of Historic Places
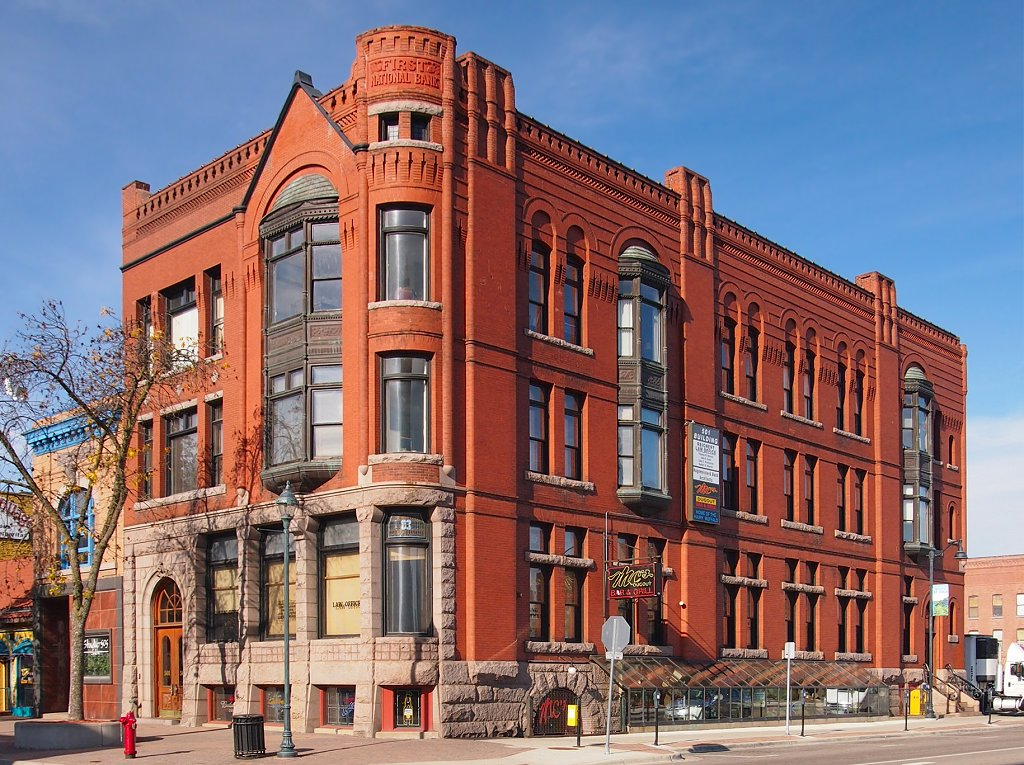
- First National Bank from the east

- Location within Minnesota Location within the United States
- Interactive map showing First National Bank’s location
- Location: 501 St. Germain Street, St. Cloud, Minnesota
- Coordinates: 45°33′40.5″N 94°9′30.5″W
- Area: Less than one acre
- Built: 1889, expanded c. 1918
- Architect: Charles Sumner Sedgwick
- Architectural style: Queen Anne
- MPS: Stearns County MRA
- NRHP reference No.: 82003054
- Added to NRHP: April 15, 1982

The First National Bank of St. Cloud, Minnesota, United States, is a historic bank building constructed in 1889 and doubled in size around 1918. It was designed by architect Charles Sumner Sedgwick for St. Cloud's first bank, which was established in 1867 and chartered as a national bank in 1882. The building was listed on the National Register of Historic Places in 1982 for its local significance in the themes of architecture and commerce. It was nominated for being St. Cloud's "finest designed and best preserved commercial building"—in the words of historian Thomas Harvey—and for its important financial role in the development of St. Cloud and surrounding Stearns County.

The building was constructed of red brick with granite trim and cast iron ornamentation. It housed several prominent businesses after First National Bank left in 1925. As of 2018 its tenants include a branch of Kensington Bank and a restaurant.

== See also ==
- National Register of Historic Places listings in Stearns County, Minnesota
