= Charles Sumner Sedgwick =

American architect (1856–1922)

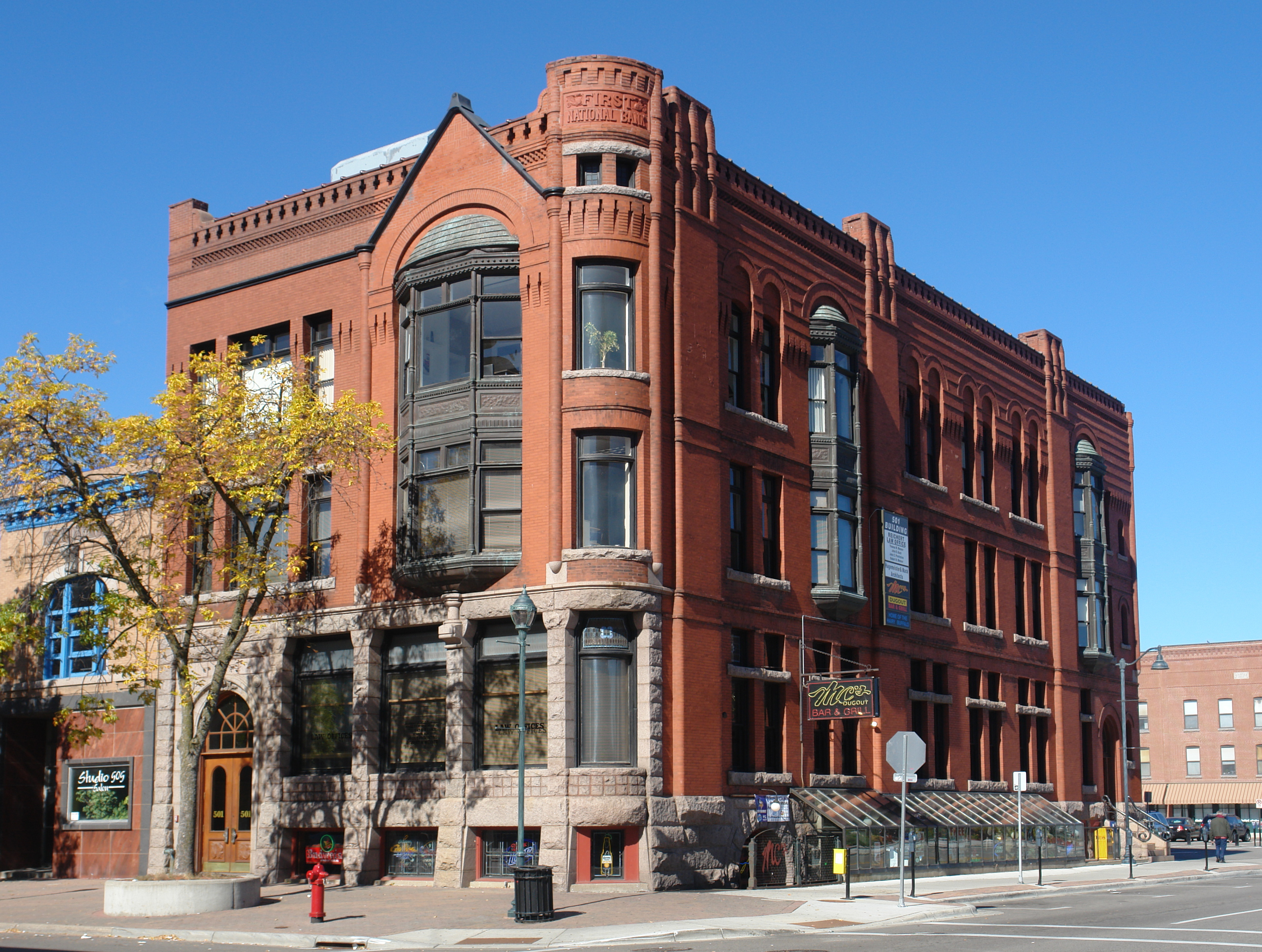
First National Bank in St. Cloud, Minnesota

Charles Sumner Sedgwick (Note: In some sources, his name has been incorrectly presented as Charles Sedgewick) (1856 – March 12, 1922) was an American architect.

== Early life and marriage ==
Sedgwick was born in 1856, in New York. His wife, Mary D., was born in the 1850s and died in 1920.

== Career ==
He started his career as an architect in Binghamton, New York and moved to Minneapolis in 1884 and completed several projects in the city and surrounding areas and states. Several of his works are listed on the National Register of Historic Places. Sedgwick is a designated Minneapolis master architect by the city's heritage preservation authority.

== Death ==
He died on March 12, 1922, aged 65 or 66, at St. Barnabas Hospital in Minnesota, from Bright's disease. He was buried in Lakewood Cemetery.

== Works ==
Sedgwick was most known for his residential commissions, but also designed churches, school buildings, and commercial structures.

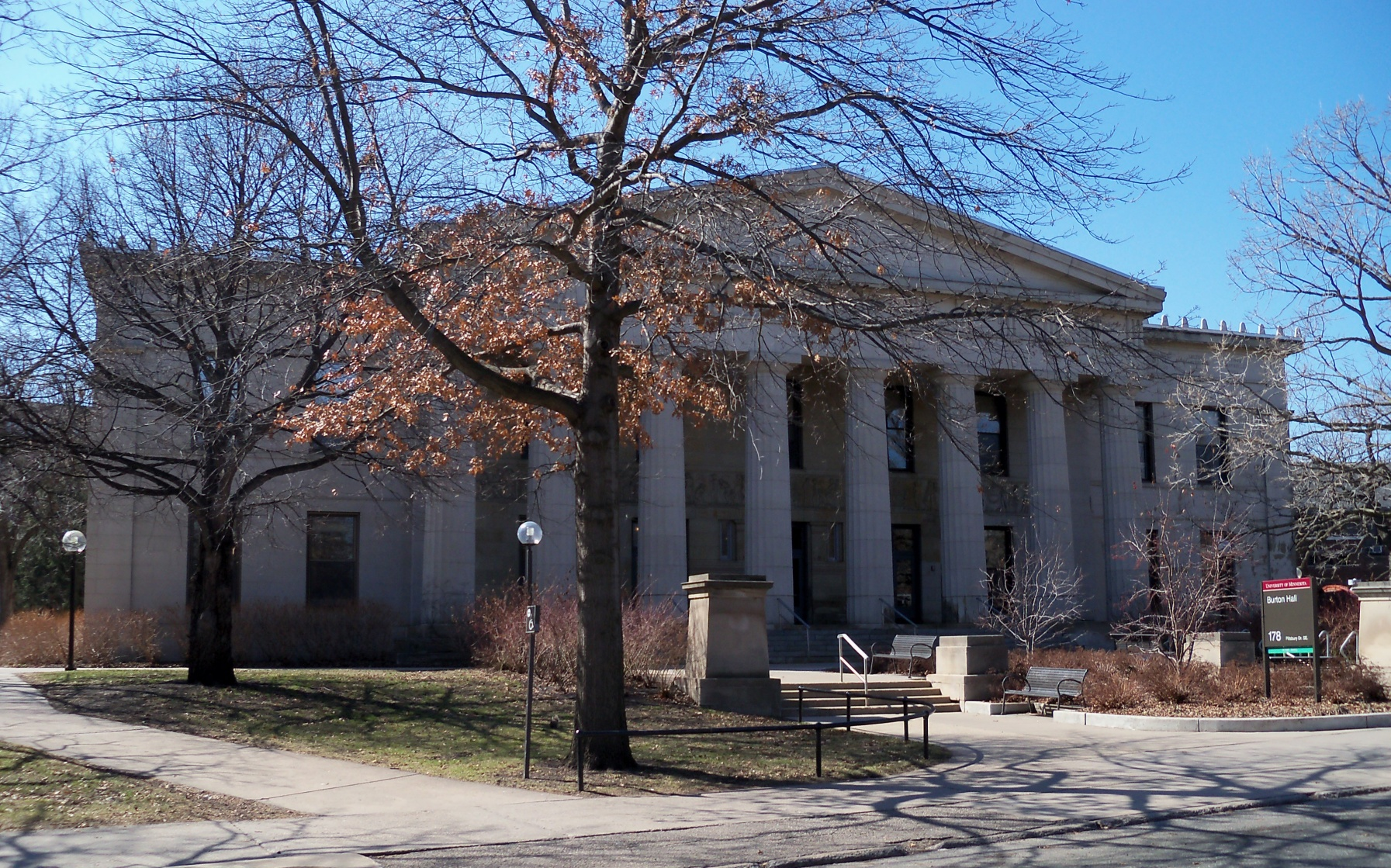
Burton Hall at the University of Minnesota

- George W. Baird House (1886), Edina, Minnesota, NRHP-listed
- Como Congregational Church (1886), Minneapolis, Minnesota
- George R. Newell House (1888), 1818 LaSalle Ave., Minneapolis, MN (Sedgwick, Charles), NRHP-listed
- First National Bank (1889), 501 St. Germain St., St. Cloud, MN (Sedgwick, Charles), NRHP-listed
- Old Arkansas City High School (1890), Arkansas City, Kansas, formerly the Arkansas City High School building and now Ireland Hall at Cowley Community College; NRHP-listed
- Andrew Presbyterian Church (1890), at Fourth Street and Eighth Avenue, Minneapolis, patterned after St. Giles in Scotland. Demolished c.2002.
- Nehemiah P. Clarke House (1892–93), 356 3rd Ave., S., St. Cloud, MN (Sedgwick, Charles S.), NRHP-listed
- Westminster Presbyterian Church (1897), 1201–1213 Nicollet Mall with Warren H. Hayes, NRHP-listed
- Dayton's (1902) at 700 Nicollet Mall in Minneapolis (later converted to a Macy's before closing down)
- Burton Hall (University of Minnesota) interior at the University of Minnesota (1895) with Leroy Buffington designing the exterior. The building was formerly used as a library

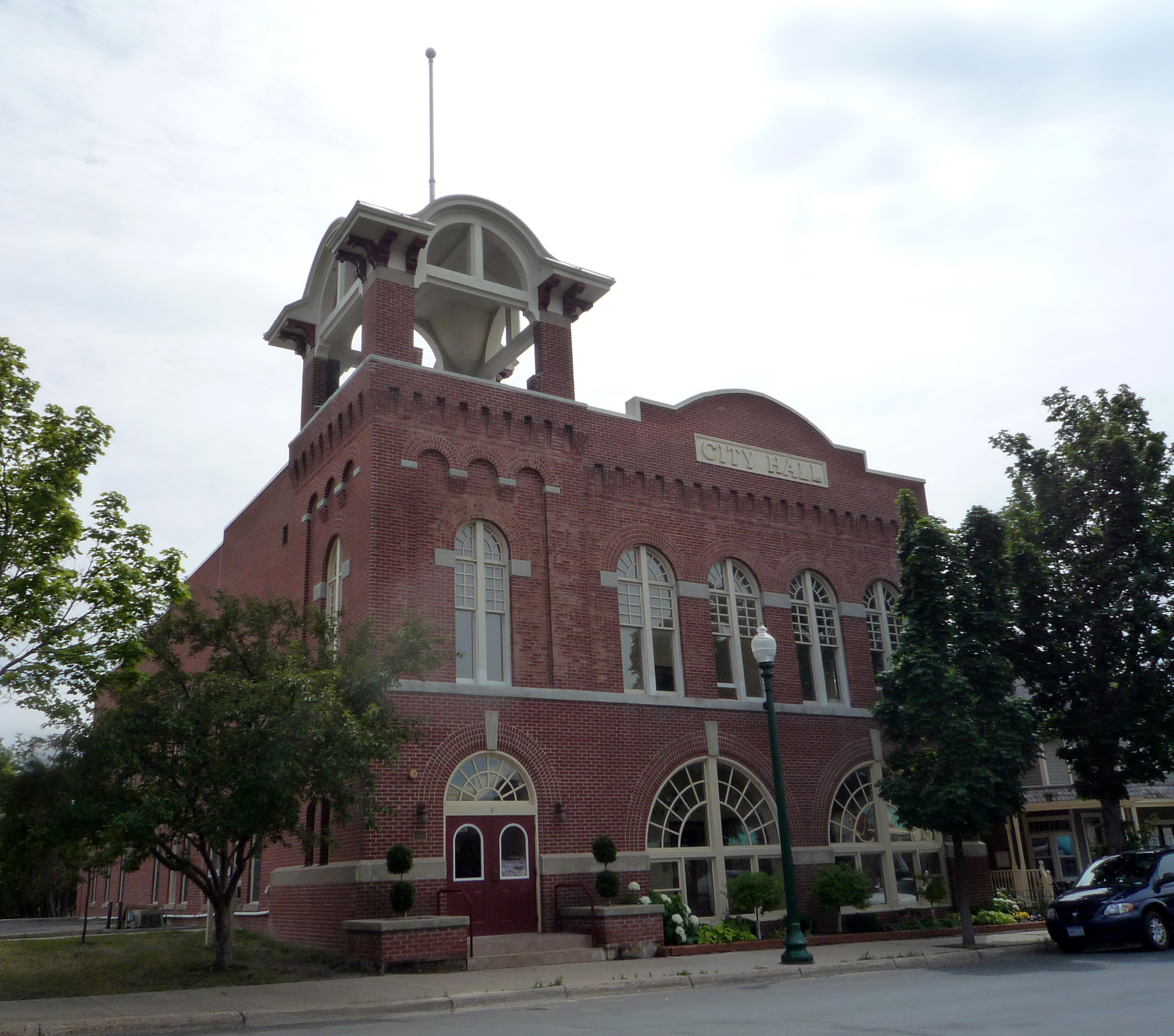
Old Waconia City Hall

- Budge Hall (1899 – demolished 1981) and Science Hall (renamed Minard Hall in honor of Dean A. E. Minard) at North Dakota State University Minard Hall has been added on to and extensively renovated over the years.
- William F. Bruell House (1902), Address Restricted, Redfield, South Dakota (Sedgwick & Saxton), NRHP-listed
- Four story commercial building at 256 1st Avenue North (1902) in Minneapolis
- Morris Carnegie Library (1905), Nevada and 6th Sts., Morris, MN (Sedgwick & Saxton), NRHP-listed
- Old Waconia City Hall (1909), 9 W. 1st St. in Waconia, Minnesota, NRHP-listed
- First Lutheran Church (1916) 434 First Street Southwest in Blooming Prairie, Minnesota
- Park Avenue Covenant Church, Minneapolis
- Park Avenue Congregational Church, at Park and Franklin Avenues, Minneapolis
- Lowry Hill Congregational Church, at Dupont and Franklin Avenue, Minneapolis
- Fourth Baptist Church, at 2105 Fremont Avenue North, Minneapolis

== Publications ==
As part of a popular trend, Sedgwick published his plans through newspapers and as several books. His popular Sedgwick's Best House Plans included 120 house plans in a variety of styles and costs. It went through many editions from 1905 to 2021, and customers ordered full plan sets from Sedgwick by mail order.
