= Nehemiah P. Clarke House =

Historic house in Minnesota, United States

- U.S. National Register of Historic Places
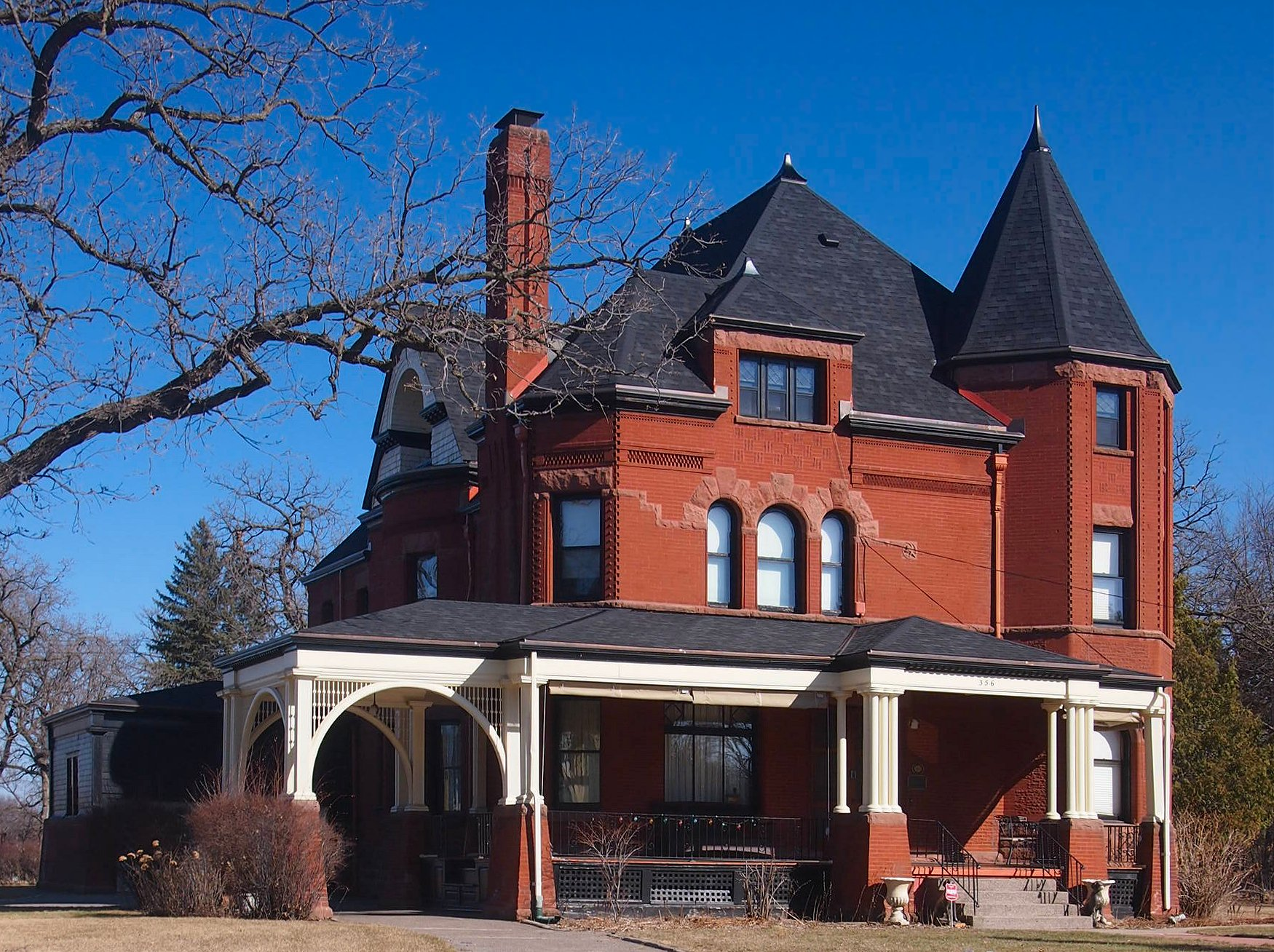
- The Nehemiah P. Clarke House viewed from the west

- Location within Minnesota Location within the United States
- Interactive map showing the location for Nehemiah P. Clark House
- Location: 356 3rd Avenue S., St. Cloud, Minnesota
- Coordinates: 45°33′30″N 94°9′7″W
- Area: Less than one acre
- Built: 1893
- Architect: Charles S. Sedgwick
- Architectural style: Queen Anne
- MPS: Stearns County MRA
- NRHP reference No.: 82003052
- Added to NRHP: April 15, 1982

The Nehemiah P. Clarke House is a historic house in St. Cloud, Minnesota, United States.

== History ==
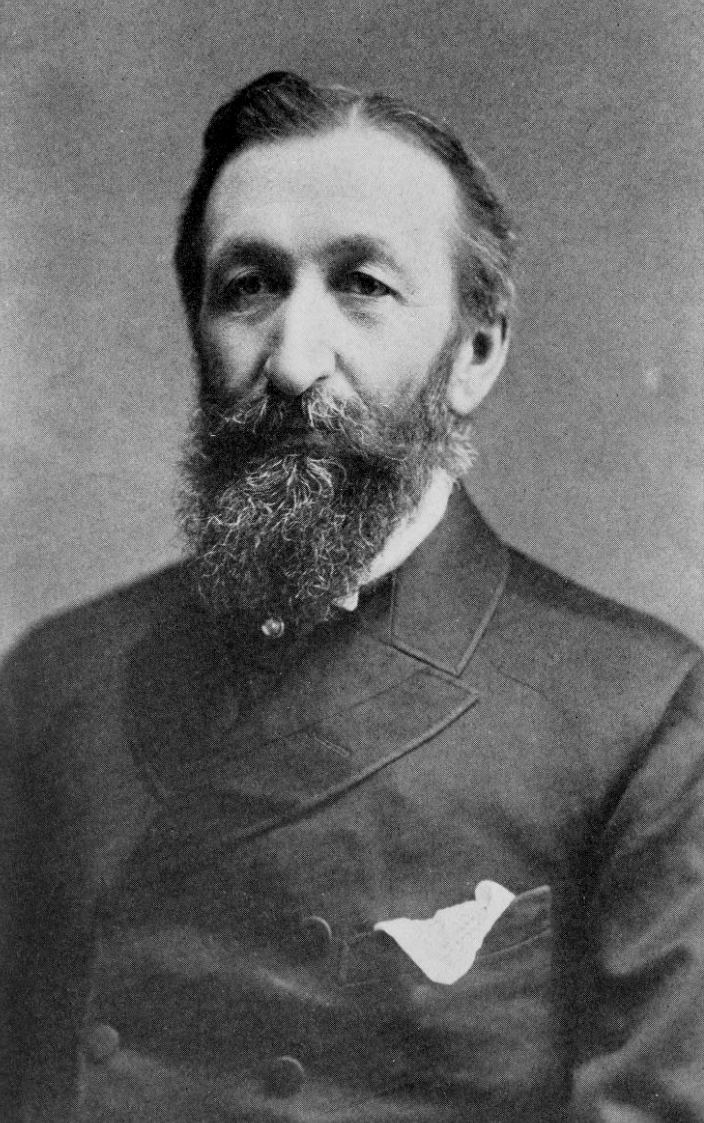
Nehemiah P. Clarke

It was built in 1893 for Nehemiah P. Clarke (1836–1912), who arrived in St. Cloud as a pioneer in 1856 and made his fortune in retail, lumbering, and other business ventures.

The house was listed on the National Register of Historic Places in 1982 for its local significance in the themes of architecture and commerce. It was nominated for its outstanding Queen Anne architecture and its association with Clarke.

== See also ==
- National Register of Historic Places listings in Stearns County, Minnesota
