= George R. Newell House (Orlando, Florida) =

Historic house in Florida, United States

- Formerly listed on the U.S. National Register of Historic Places
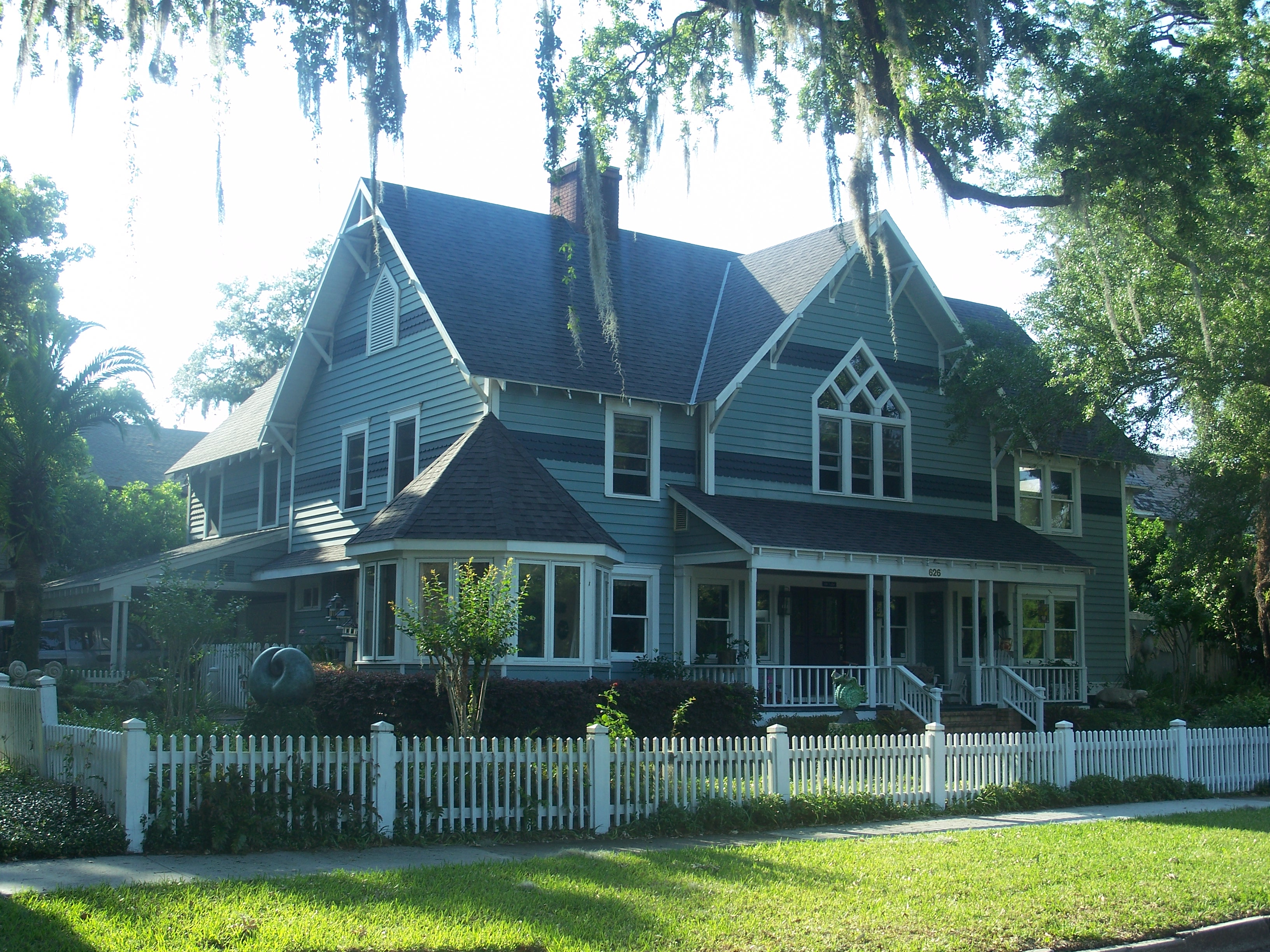
- New house built near original location
- Location: 624 S. Lake Ave., Orlando, Florida
- Area: less than one acre
- Built: 1885
- Architectural style: Late Victorian
- NRHP reference No.: 75002163

Significant dates
- Added to NRHP: January 1, 1975
- Removed from NRHP: Unknown

The George R. Newell House in Orlando, Florida was built in 1885 by George R. Newell, a Baltimore attorney, for his bride, Susie Gibson. At the time, the other homes on Lake Avenue were also occupied by newlyweds, so the area became known as "Honeymoon Row." It was lived in continuously by the Newells and their two sons, Leigh G. and Sidney P. The home was then occupied by Sidney and his wife, Eleanor Hope Cobb, and two daughters Eleanor Hope and Sue Gibson, until 1970, when both Sidney and Eleanor Hope died.

It is a historic house that was formerly listed on the National Register of Historic Places. Its listing status changed in 1975. This was due to the house being sold by Sidney and Eleanor Hope's estate after an attempt to have it purchased and restored by a local historical group failed because of lack of funds. It was demolished the same year by its new owners, who built condos on the rear of the lot and a house of a similar plan on the front of the lot.
