= George R. Newell House (Minneapolis, Minnesota) =

Historic house in Minnesota, United States

- U.S. National Register of Historic Places
- Minneapolis Landmark
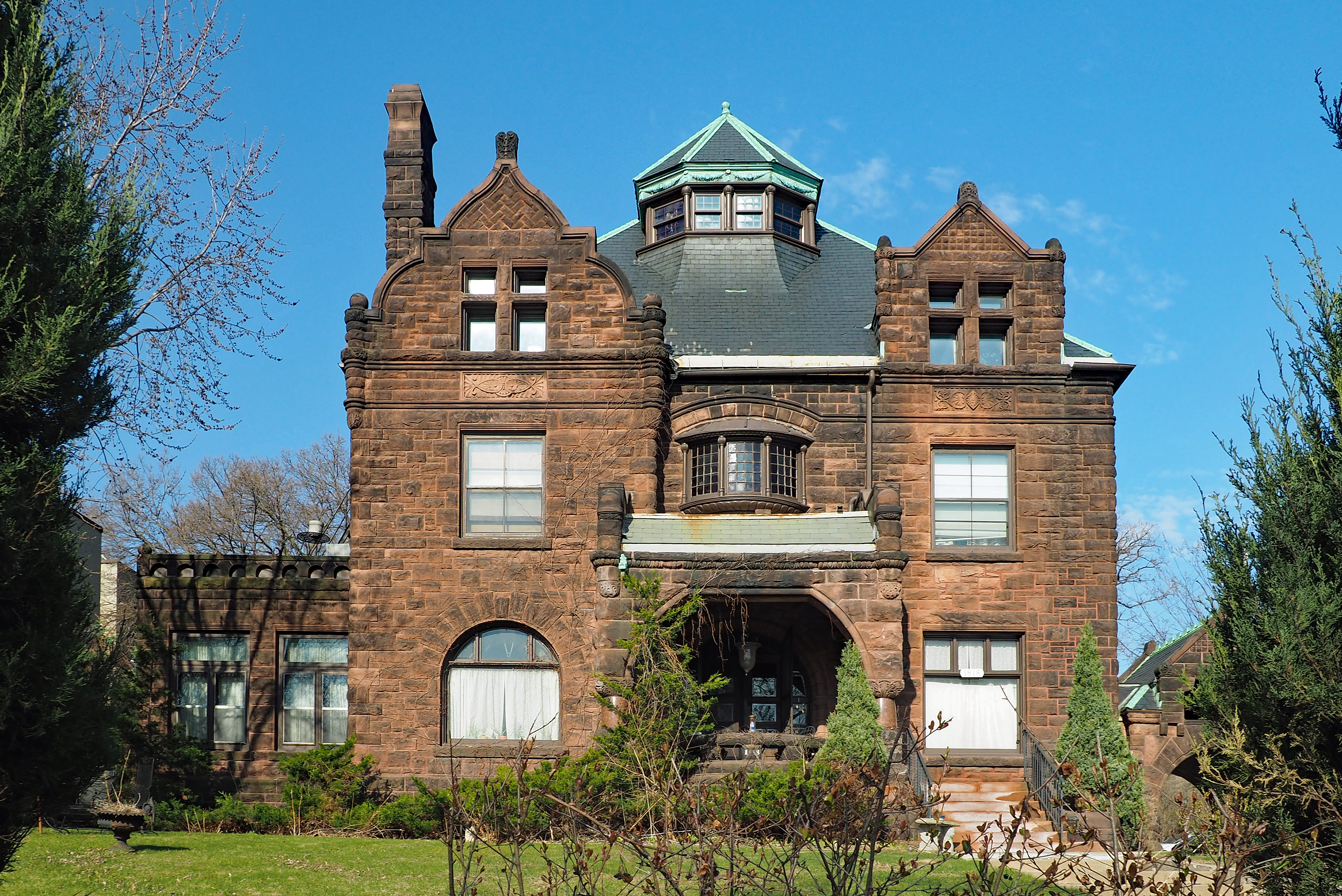
- The George R. Newell House viewed from the east

- Location within Minnesota Location within the United States
- Location: 1818 LaSalle Avenue, Minneapolis, Minnesota
- Coordinates: 44°57′53.3″N 93°16′47.5″W
- Built: 1888
- Architect: Charles S. Sedgwick
- Architectural style: Richardsonian Romanesque
- NRHP reference No.: 77000744

Significant dates
- Added to NRHP: September 15, 1977
- Designated MPLSL: 1985

The George R. Newell House, also known as Chateau LaSalle, is a historic house in the Stevens Square-Loring Heights neighborhood of Minneapolis. It was originally built for Sumner T. McKnight, a businessman who had interests in lumber and real estate. McKnight sold it almost immediately to George R. Newell, one of the founders in 1870 of the grocery firm Stevens, Morse and Newell. When Newell died in 1921, his son L.B. Newell inherited the company and changed its name to SuperValu. In later years the Chateau was owned by the Freerks family and run as an apartment complex.

Architecture critic Larry Millett calls it, "A Romanesque Revival hunk and one of the grand houses of the city." The exterior, of rusticated Lake Superior sandstone, features a terrace, an arched entrance porch, carved ornamental panels, and a crested dormer on the roof's peak. The interior, in Victorian style, is lushly decorated with oak and sycamore woodwork, Tiffany & Co. lighting, and gold-leaf scrollwork. The house was listed on the National Register of Historic Places in 1977.
