= Walt Dziedzic =

American politician (1932–2018)

Member of the Minneapolis City Council from the 1st Ward
- In office 1976–1998

Personal details
- Born: November 29, 1932 Minneapolis, Minnesota, U.S.
- Died: November 24, 2018 (aged 85) Robbinsdale, Minnesota, U.S.
- Party: Democratic (DFL)
- Children: Kari Dziedzic, Joe Dziedzic
- Education: College of St. Thomas
- Occupation: Politician, Police Officer, Teacher

Military service
- Battles/wars: Korean War

Walt Paul Dziedzic (November 29, 1932 – November 24, 2018) was an American politician who served on the Minneapolis city council from 1976 until 1998, and then on the park board until his retirement in 2010. Prior to entering politics, Dziedzic spent 16 years as a police officer and inspector. He was also a Commissioner of the Minneapolis Park and Recreation Board.

== Biography ==
Dziedzic grew up in the community of Northeast, Minneapolis and attended Edison High School, where he was an all-city athlete and earned nine letters in football, baseball, and hockey. He served in the United States Army during the Korean War, and was present at Panmunjom when the Korean Armistice Agreement was signed.

From 1951–1955, Dziedzic played professional baseball for several minor league teams within the Brooklyn Dodgers organization, before attending the College of St. Thomas. After graduation, he taught at DeLaSalle High School during the 1960–61 school year. He married Patricia McCarthy before joining the Minneapolis Police Department. During his 16 years as an officer, he worked his way up from Inspector of Police, then lieutenant investigator, and later burglary detective.

In 1976, Dziedzic ran for an open First Ward council seat. He served on the Minneapolis city council representing Northeast, Minneapolis for 22 years. He then served on the Park Board for another 12 years where he convinced Jim Lupient to develop a waterpark in Northeast Minneapolis later named Jim Lupient Waterpark. He was co-founder of Art-A-Whirl and founder of "Seniors Day at the Dome." Dziedzic worked to create the Quarry Shopping Center, the largest retail development in Minneapolis outside of downtown at the time of its construction in the late 1990s.

On November 24, 2018, Dziedzic died of natural causes at the North Memorial Medical Center. He was 85.

== Personal life ==
Dziedzic had six children, three boys and three girls. His late daughter, Kari Dziedzic, was elected to the Minnesota Senate in a January 2012 special election. His son, Joe Dziedzic, played two years in the National Hockey League for the Pittsburgh Penguins. He was Catholic.
