= Raymond Julkowski =

American businessman, lawyer, and politician

Raymond J. Julkowski (February 2, 1908 – August 22, 1989) was an American businessman, lawyer, and politician.

Julkowski was born in Minneapolis, Minnesota and went to the Minneapolis parochial and public schools. He graduated from Edison High School, in Minneapolis, in 1928. Julkowski graduated from University of St. Thomas (formerly College of St. Thomas) and then he received his law degree from University of St. Thomas School of Law (formerly St. Thomas College of Law) in 1931. He then practiced law in Minneapolis and was involved with the banking business. Julkowski served in the Minnesota House of Representatives from 1935 to 1938 and then served in the Minnesota Senate from 1939 to 1954.

He died from a heart ailment at his home in Minneapolis, Minnesota.
