= Joe Dziedzic =

American ice hockey player (born 1971)

- Born: December 18, 1971 (age 54) Minneapolis, Minnesota, U.S.
- Height: 6 ft 03 in (191 cm)
- Weight: 227 lb (103 kg; 16 st 3 lb)
- Position: Left wing
- Shot: Left
- Played for: Pittsburgh Penguins; Phoenix Coyotes
- NHL draft: 61st overall, 1990; Pittsburgh Penguins
- Playing career: 1994–1999

Joseph Walter Dziedzic (born December 18, 1971) is an American former professional ice hockey left winger.

== Career ==
Joe Dziedzic was drafted in 1990 while playing for Edison High School in Minneapolis and was named Minnesota Mr. Hockey the same year. Following high school, Dziedzic continued playing at the University of Minnesota for four seasons. He spent his first pro seasons split between the NHL and AHL, but was forced into early retirement due to an eye injury.

== Personal ==
Dziedzic currently runs a youth hockey program in Minneapolis and is the Minneapolis High School hockey coach.

Joe's father, Walt Dziedzic, was a Minneapolis police officer, served the City Council for 22 years, and was a Park Board Commissioner for another 12 years, before announcing plans to retire at the end of 2009. His late sister, Kari Dziedzic, served as Majority Leader of the Minnesota Senate.

Joe is married to his wife Kelly and has three children.

== Career statistics ==
			Regular Season					Playoffs
Season	Team	League	GP	G	A	Pts	PIM	GP	G	A	Pts	PIM
1990–91	University of Minnesota	WCHA	20	6	4	10	26	—	—	—	—	—
1991–92	University of Minnesota	WCHA	37	9	10	19	68	—	—	—	—	—
1992–93	University of Minnesota	WCHA	41	11	14	25	62	—	—	—	—	—
1993–94	University of Minnesota	WCHA	18	7	10	17	48	—	—	—	—	—
1994–95	Cleveland Lumberjacks	IHL	68	15	15	30	74	4	1	0	1	10
1995–96	Pittsburgh Penguins	NHL	69	5	5	10	68	16	1	2	3	19
1996–97	Pittsburgh Penguins	NHL	59	9	9	18	63	5	0	1	1	4
1997–98	Cleveland Lumberjacks	IHL	65	21	20	41	176	10	3	4	7	28
1998–99	Springfield Falcons	AHL	61	18	27	45	128	3	1	1	2	20
1998–99	Phoenix Coyotes	NHL	2	0	0	0	0	—	—	—	—	—
NHL totals			130	14	14	28	131	21	1	3	4	23

Preceded by Trent Klatt	Minnesota Mr. Hockey; 1989–90 season	Succeeded by Darby Hendrickson
