= John S. Kozlak =

American politician

John S. "Jack" Kozlak (April 28, 1928 – July 26, 2012) was an American politician and businessman.

Kozllak was born in Minneapolis, Minnesota. He went to Edison High School and the University of St. Thomas. Kozlak owned several restaurants. He served in the Minnesota House of Representatives in 1969 and 1970 and was a Democrat. Kozlak served on the Metropolitan Council of the Twin Cities Metropolitan Area from 1971 to 1975. His father Joseph A. Kozlak Sr. also served in the Minnesota Legislature. Kozlak died from heart problems.
