= Mesa Kincaid =

Mesa Kincaid (born Cheryl Holm; 23 September 1956 - 6 September 2009) was a talk radio host in the Minneapolis-St. Paul broadcast area.

== Personal ==
Kincaid was raised in Minneapolis and attended Minneapolis Edison High School, where classmates voted her the one with "Wild Wit". After high school, Mesa wore many hats behind the curtains of the old Cricket Theater in Northeast Minneapolis. During her time there, she also attended Brown College for radio, and from there she got her break and sprung into the Minneapolis market in a relatively short amount of time. She was so popular, several parents named their female children after her. Mesa had an exciting and wild ride during her years in radio, and with the birth of her daughter, she added more professional voice overs and consulting to her work in order to spend more time with her daughter. During that time in the late 1980s and early 1990s, Mesa also worked briefly as a marketing consultant for the Old West-themed park Mission Creek in northern Minnesota.

She lived with her husband, Donald Hoeft, and their son in Pine City, Minnesota, until her death on September 6, 2009, from an apparent heart attack at the age of 52. She had a daughter.

== Career ==
Kincaid worked in the 1970s and early 1980s at numerous stations including KQRS-FM, WCCO-FM (now KMNB) and KSTP-FM but is best remembered as "Cheetah" or "The Fox that Rocks" on U100, which later became KDWB-FM.

Mesa also worked on the KQRS-FM morning show with Tom Barnard, which was called the "Cat and Kincaid" show. She was a pioneer in a male-dominated industry and is known for her sparkling on-air presence and, on a more personal level, her deep compassion and sacrifice for those she cared about.
