= Kari Dziedzic =

American politician (1962–2024)

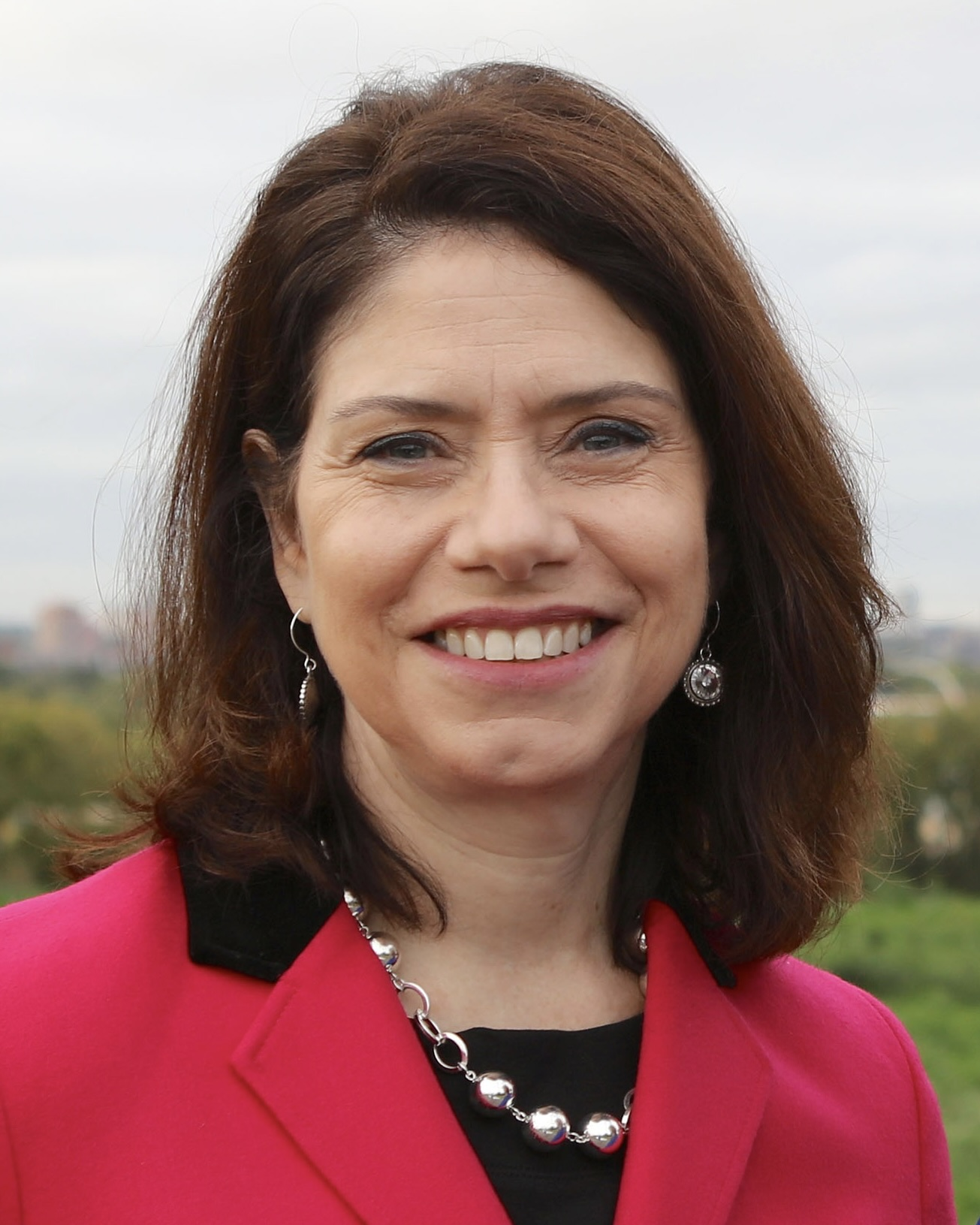
- Dziedzic in 2016

Majority Leader of the Minnesota Senate
- In office January 3, 2023 – February 6, 2024
- Preceded by: Jeremy Miller
- Succeeded by: Erin Murphy

Member of the Minnesota Senate
- In office January 20, 2012 – December 27, 2024
- Preceded by: Larry Pogemiller
- Succeeded by: Doron Clark
- Constituency: 59th district (2012–2013); 60th district (2013–2024)

Personal details
- Born: June 5, 1962 Minneapolis, Minnesota, U.S.
- Died: December 27, 2024 (aged 62) Minnesota, U.S.
- Party: Democratic (DFL)
- Relatives: Walt Dziedzic (father); Joe Dziedzic (brother)
- Education: University of Minnesota (BS)

Kari Dziedzic (/ˈdiːdzɪk/ DEED-zik; June 5, 1962 – December 27, 2024) was an American politician and member of the Minnesota Senate. A member of the Minnesota Democratic–Farmer–Labor Party (DFL), she represented District 60, which includes portions of the city of Minneapolis in Hennepin County. District 60 is also notable for including part of the University of Minnesota. In 2022, she was selected by her caucus to serve as Majority Leader for the 93rd Minnesota Legislature. Before holding elected office, Dziedzic was executive assistant to U.S. Senator Paul Wellstone.

She stepped down from leadership after the first session due to a cancer diagnosis. In October 2025, the 10th Avenue Bridge in Minneapolis was dedicated in her honor.

== Early life, education, and career ==
Dziedzic was the daughter of Walt Dziedzic, a longtime Minneapolis City Council member, Minneapolis Park Board member, and police inspector. Her brother is retired NHL player Joe Dziedzic. She attended Edison High School in Minneapolis, and received a degree in mechanical engineering from the University of Minnesota.

Dziedzic entered politics as an aide to U.S. Senator Paul Wellstone. Afterward, she worked for Hennepin County, first as communications director for the Hennepin County Attorney, then as a policy aide for County Commissioner Mark Stenglein.

In the private sector, Dziedzic was an executive assistant to Minnesota North Stars owner Norm Green. She filed a sexual harassment lawsuit against him in 1993 that alleged Green had harassed Dziedzic and at least three other female employees of the North Stars. The lawsuit was settled out of court.

== Minnesota Senate ==
Dziedzic was elected in a special election on January 10, 2012, and reelected in November 2012. She succeeded former Minnesota Senate Majority Leader Larry Pogemiller, who had resigned to take a position in the administration of Governor Mark Dayton. Dziedzic was reelected in 2016, 2020, and 2022.

After the DFL retook the Senate majority in the 2022 Minnesota Senate election, Dziedzic was selected to serve as majority leader.

In 2023, Dziedzic was diagnosed with ovarian cancer, and on February 2, 2024, she announced that she would step down as majority leader after her cancer had recurred.

== Personal life and death ==
Dziedzic was Catholic. She died from ovarian cancer at an assisted-living facility in Minnesota on December 27, 2024, at the age of 62.

== Posthumous honors ==
In April 2025, the Minnesota Senate unanimously voted to rename Minneapolis's 10th Avenue Bridge for Dziedzic. It was officially dedicated to her on October 1, 2025.

Minnesota Senate
Preceded by Larry Pogemiller	Member of the Minnesota Senate from the 60th district 59th (2012–2013); 2012–2024	Succeeded by Doron Clark
Preceded by Jeremy Miller	Majority Leader of the Minnesota Senate; 2023–2024	Succeeded by Erin Murphy
