= Stanley Fudro =

American politician

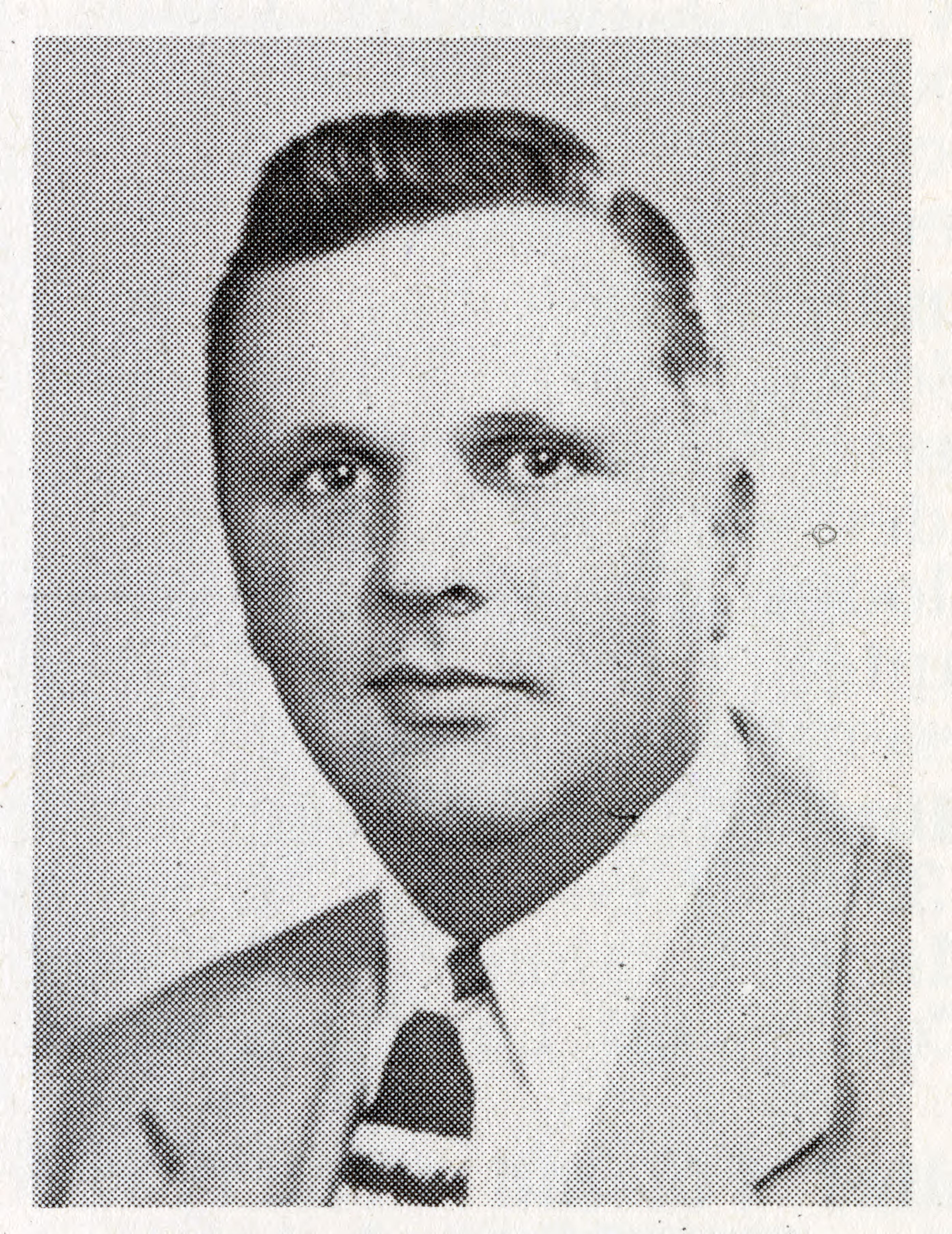
- Fudro c. 1957

Member of the Minnesota House of Representatives
- In office January 7, 1957 – January 4, 1981
- Governor: Wendell R. Anderson; Rudy Perpich; Al Quie

Personal details
- Born: Stanislaw J. Fudro; May 6, 1918 Minneapolis, Minnesota, U.S.
- Died: December 30, 2008 (aged 90) Anoka, Minnesota, U.S.
- Resting place: Gethsemane Cemetery, New Hope, Minnesota, U.S.
- Other political affiliations: Democrat (DFL)
- Education: University of Minnesota; University of St. Thomas
- Awards: Purple Heart

Military service
- Allegiance: United States
- Branch/service: United States Coast Guard
- Battles/wars: World War II

Stanislaw "Stanley" J. Fudro (May 6, 1918 – December 30, 2008) was an American businessman, toy maker, and politician.

Fudro was born in Minneapolis, Minnesota and graduated from Edison High School in 1939. He served in the United States Coast Guard during World War II. Fudro went to the University of St. Thomas and University of Minnesota.

Fudro was the owner of the Marla Toy Company and was a toy inventor. He was also a home builder and was involved with the carpenters labor union. Fudro served in the Minnesota House of Representatives from 1957 to 1980 and was a Democrat.

== Personal life ==
Fudro married Ramona Mikolajczyk on October 31, 1959. The couple had five children: Beth, Angelle, Lisa, Marla, and Gretchen.

Fudro died in Anoka, Minnesota on December 30, 2008 aged 90.
