= John Billman =

American football player (1919–2012)

No. 32, 33
- Positions: Guard, tackle, linebacker

Personal information
- Born: December 1, 1919; Minneapolis, Minnesota, U.S.
- Died: March 16, 2012 (aged 92); Plymouth, Minnesota, U.S.
- Listed height: 6 ft 1 in (1.85 m)
- Listed weight: 202 lb (92 kg)

Career information
- High school: Edison (Minneapolis)
- College: Minnesota
- NFL draft: 1943: 11th round, 92nd overall pick

Career history
- Brooklyn Dodgers (1946); Chicago Rockets (1947)

Awards and highlights
- 2× National champion (1940, 1941); Second-team All-Big Ten (1942)

Career AAFC statistics
- Games played: 5
- Games started: 1
- Stats at Pro Football Reference

John Arthur Billman (December 1, 1919 – March 16, 2012) was an American professional football guard who played two seasons in the All-America Football Conference (AAFC) with the Brooklyn Dodgers and Chicago Rockets. He was selected by the Philadelphia Eagles in the eleventh round of the 1943 NFL draft after playing college football at the University of Minnesota.

== Early life ==
Billman played high school football at Edison High School in Minneapolis, Minnesota.

== College career ==
Billman played for the Minnesota Golden Gophers from 1939 to 1942. He played in the East–West Shrine Game on January 1, 1943. He graduated with in 1943 with a BA in Liberal Arts and an associates degree in Mortuary Science. Billman also joined Sigma Alpha Epsilon while at the University of Minnesota.

== Military career ==
Billman joined the Navy V7 program in 1941 and received orders for active duty the morning after his college graduation. He trained in motor torpedo boat operations and was a PT boat captain with Squadron 9 in the South Pacific. He was discharged in May 1946.

== Professional career ==
Billman was selected by the Philadelphia Eagles in the 11th round with the 92nd pick in the 1943 NFL draft. He played in two games for the Brooklyn Dodgers in 1946. He played in two games for the Chicago Rockets in 1947.

== Personal life ==
Billman joined his father in the mortuary business after his football career and expanded the business to include funeral chapels in Wayzata, Minneapolis and St. Louis Park. He joined the Naval Reserve as a personnel officer in 1948 and served on active duty from 1950 to 1952. He retired from the Naval Reserve in 1970 as a commander. Billman later retired from the mortuary business in 1983. He was a direct descendant of the Mayflower on his mother's side.
