= Holland, Minneapolis =

Coordinates: 45.0119°N 93.2573°W

Holland
- Neighborhood
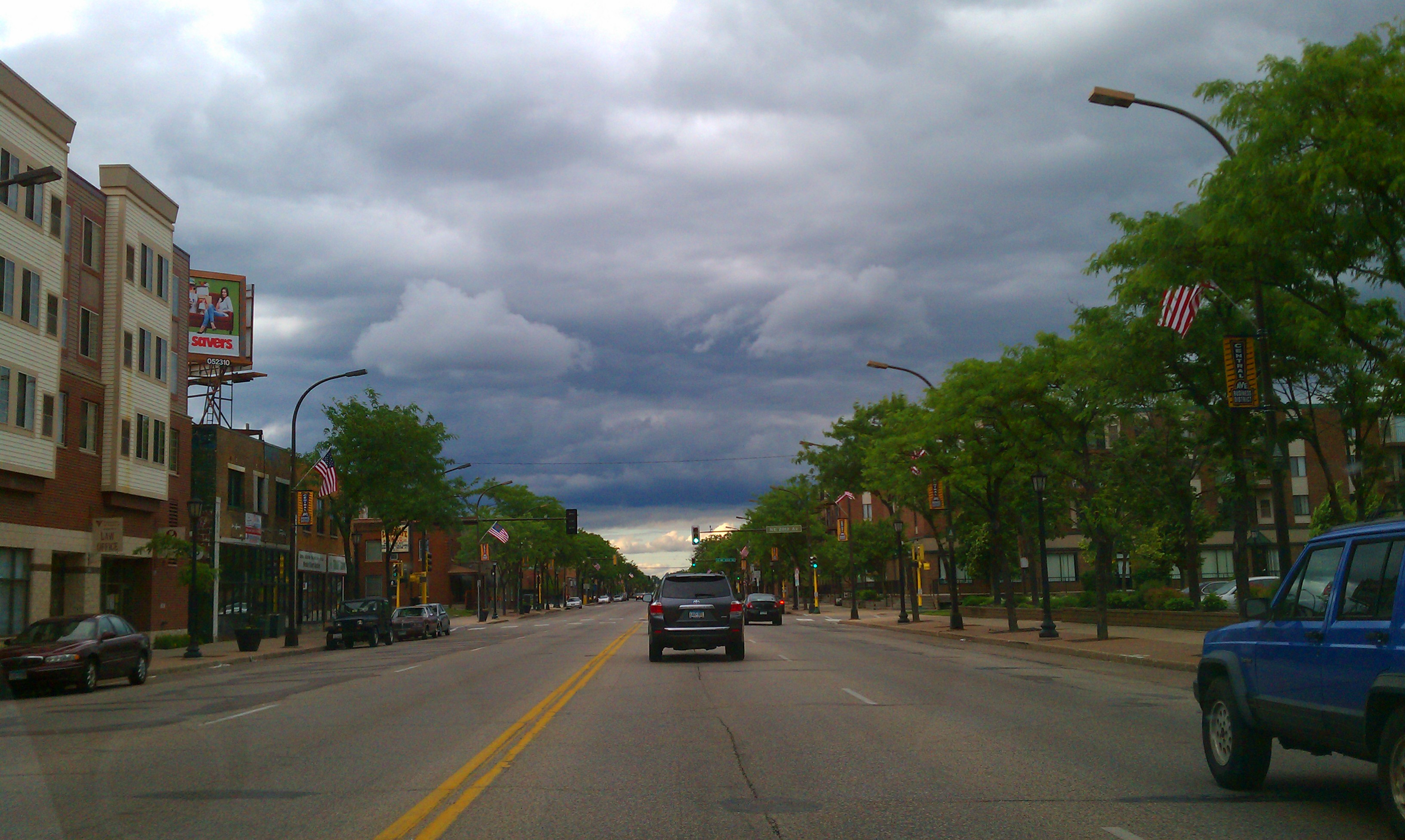
- Central Avenue

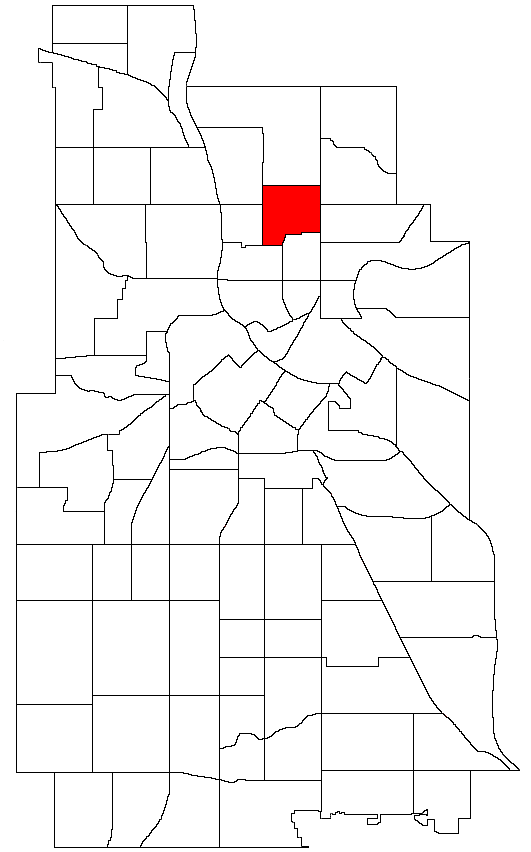
- Location of Holland within the U.S. city of Minneapolis
- Interactive map of Holland
- Country: United States
- State: Minnesota
- County: Hennepin
- City: Minneapolis
- Community: Northeast
- City Council Ward: 1

Government
  - Council Member: Elliott Payne

Area
  - Total: 0.531 sq mi (1.38 km^{2})

Population (2020)
  - Total: 4,995
  - Density: 9,410/sq mi (3,630/km^{2})
- Time zone: UTC-6 (CST)
  - Summer (DST): UTC-5 (CDT)
- ZIP code: 55413, 55418
- Area code: 612

Historical population
Census	Pop.	Note	%±
1980	4,185		—
1990	4,328		3.4%
2000	4,381		1.2%
2010	4,507		2.9%
2020	4,995		10.8%

Holland is a neighborhood in the Northeast community in Minneapolis. It is one of ten neighborhoods in Ward 1 of Minneapolis, currently represented by Council President Elliott Payne.

== Location and characteristics ==
Holland's boundaries are 27th Avenue NE to the north, Central Avenue to the east, 19th and 17th Avenues NE to the south, and University Avenue NE to the west. It is named after Josiah G. Holland, an American educator, novelist and poet.

Much of the neighborhood is smaller residential housing dating from before 1920. During the early 20th century it was a common destination for immigrants from Eastern Europe, some of whom worked at the Shoreham Yards railroad complex north of the neighborhood. Today it is considered part of the Northeast Minneapolis Arts District as it has gradually transformed to include more small businesses, restaurants, art galleries and workspaces.

== Demographics ==
Race/ethnicity
Race/ethnicity	2000		2010		2020	
Race/ethnicity	Number	%	Number	%	Number	%
White alone	3,043	69.46	2,257	50.08	2,625	54.08
Black alone	372	8.49	885	19.64	927	19.10
Hispanic or Latino (any race)	418	9.54	976	21.66	881	18.15
Native American alone	160	3.65	114	2.53	72	1.48
Asian alone	168	3.83	82	1.82	94	1.94
Other race alone	17	0.39	17	0.38	19	0.39
Pacific Islander alone	0	0.00	2	0.04	6	0.12
Two or more races	203	4.63	174	3.86	230	4.74
Total	4,381	100.0	4,507	100.0	4,854	100.0

== Landmarks ==
The neighborhood is home to Edison High School, the nearby Jackson Square Park and the Northeast Branch of the Hennepin County Library. A strip of land on the north side of 27th Avenue NE has been dedicated to community use and is maintained by its owners, Canadian Pacific Railway. Although officially the strip is within the Columbia Park neighborhood, Holland volunteers are largely responsible for its development, including a playground and neighborhood garden.

Holland is bisected by two active lines of Burlington Northern Railway which converge within the neighborhood, one connecting to downtown Minneapolis, the other to Saint Paul via the rail yards north of the University of Minnesota. Both are fully grade-separated, making railroad bridges a significant feature of the neighborhood.

Holland's east boundary is Central Avenue, one of the main commercial districts of the neighborhood and the larger Northeast community. It includes the Northeast Library branch of the Hennepin County Library. Other businesses lie along Lowry and University Avenues.

== Transportation ==
Holland is served by Metro Transit bus routes 10 (Central Avenue), 17 (Washington Street), and 32 (Lowry Avenue). 22nd Avenue NE is a bicycle boulevard and Central Avenue has dedicated bike lanes.

== Gallery ==
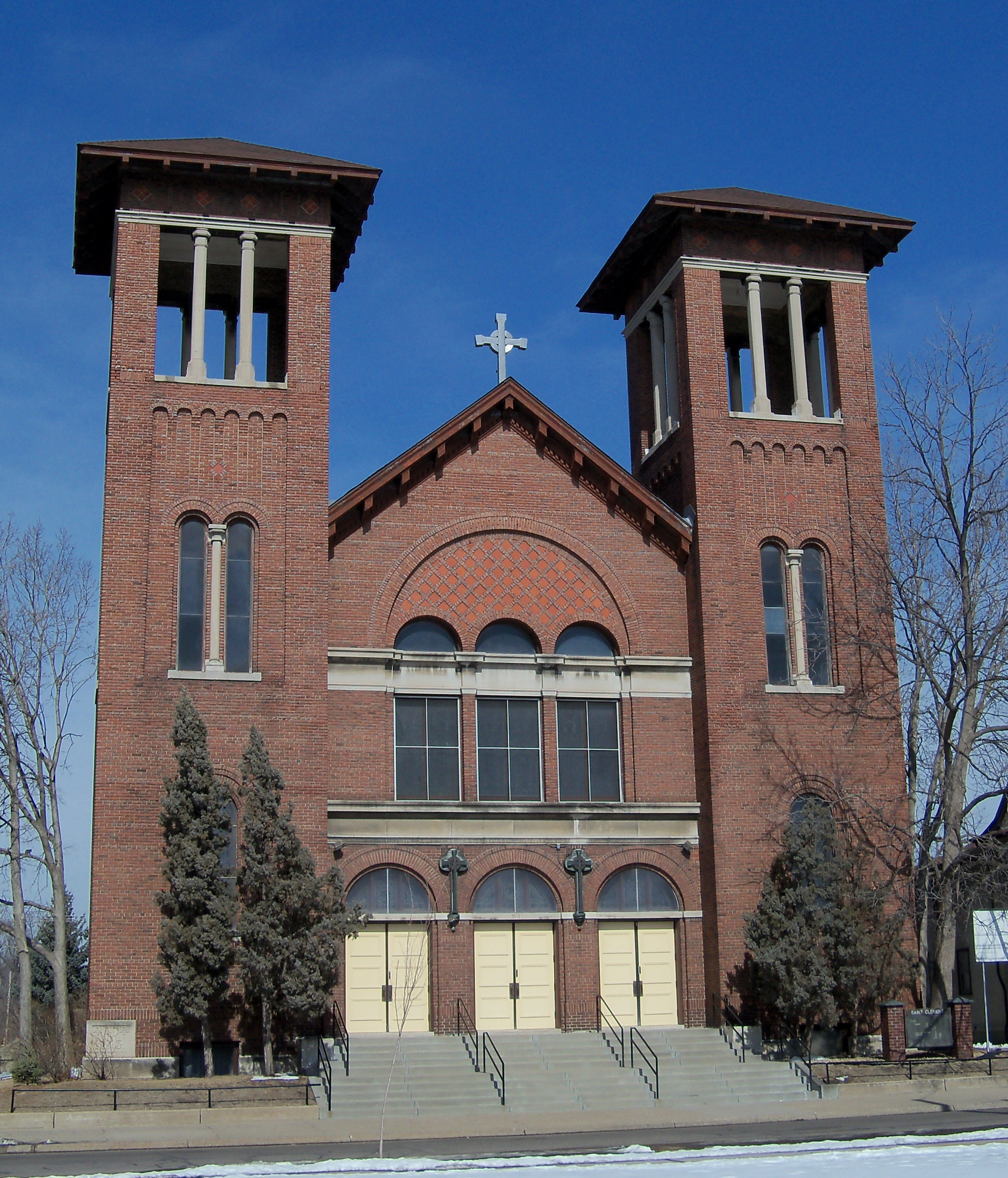
St. Clement Catholic Church

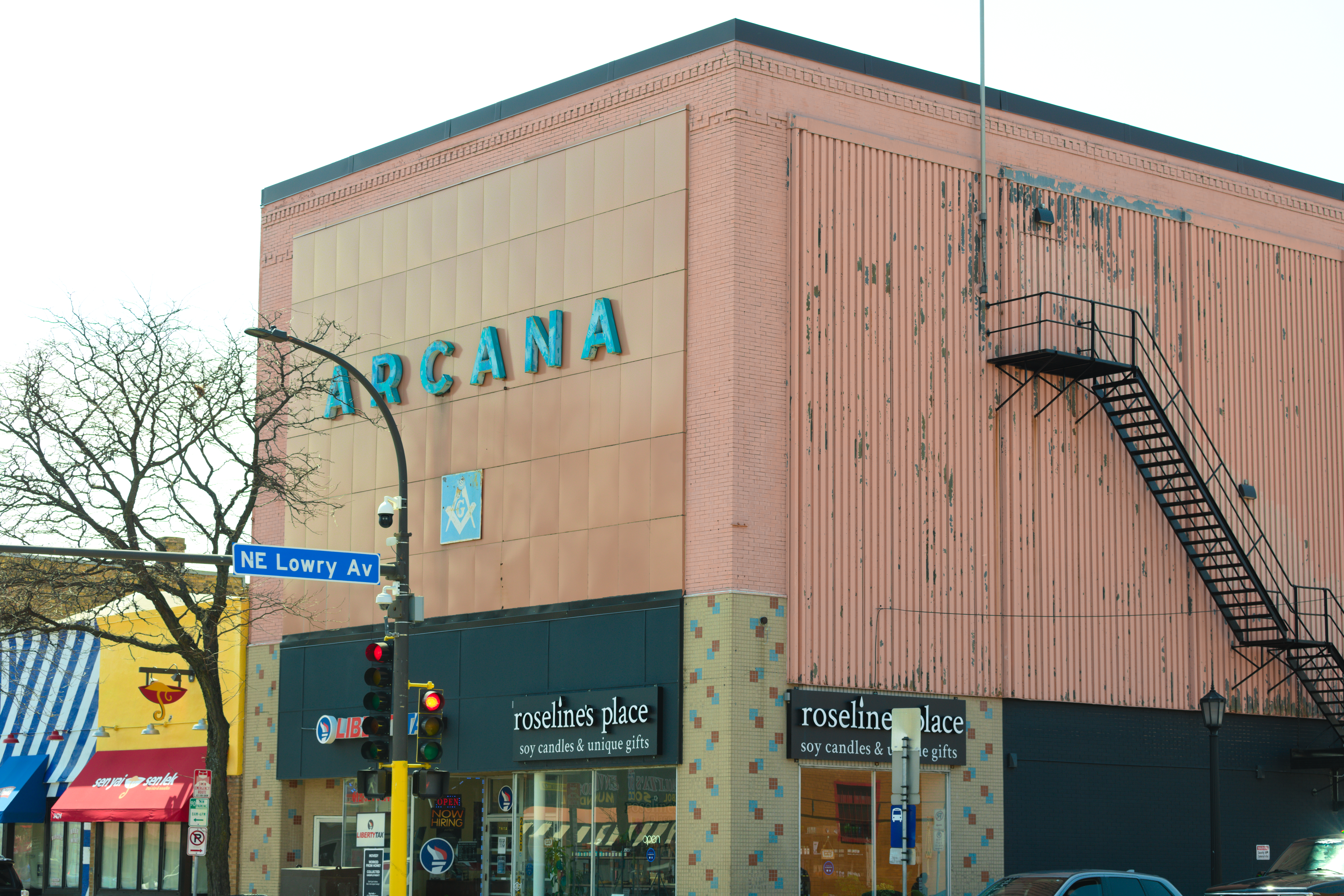
Arcana Building on Lowry Avenue

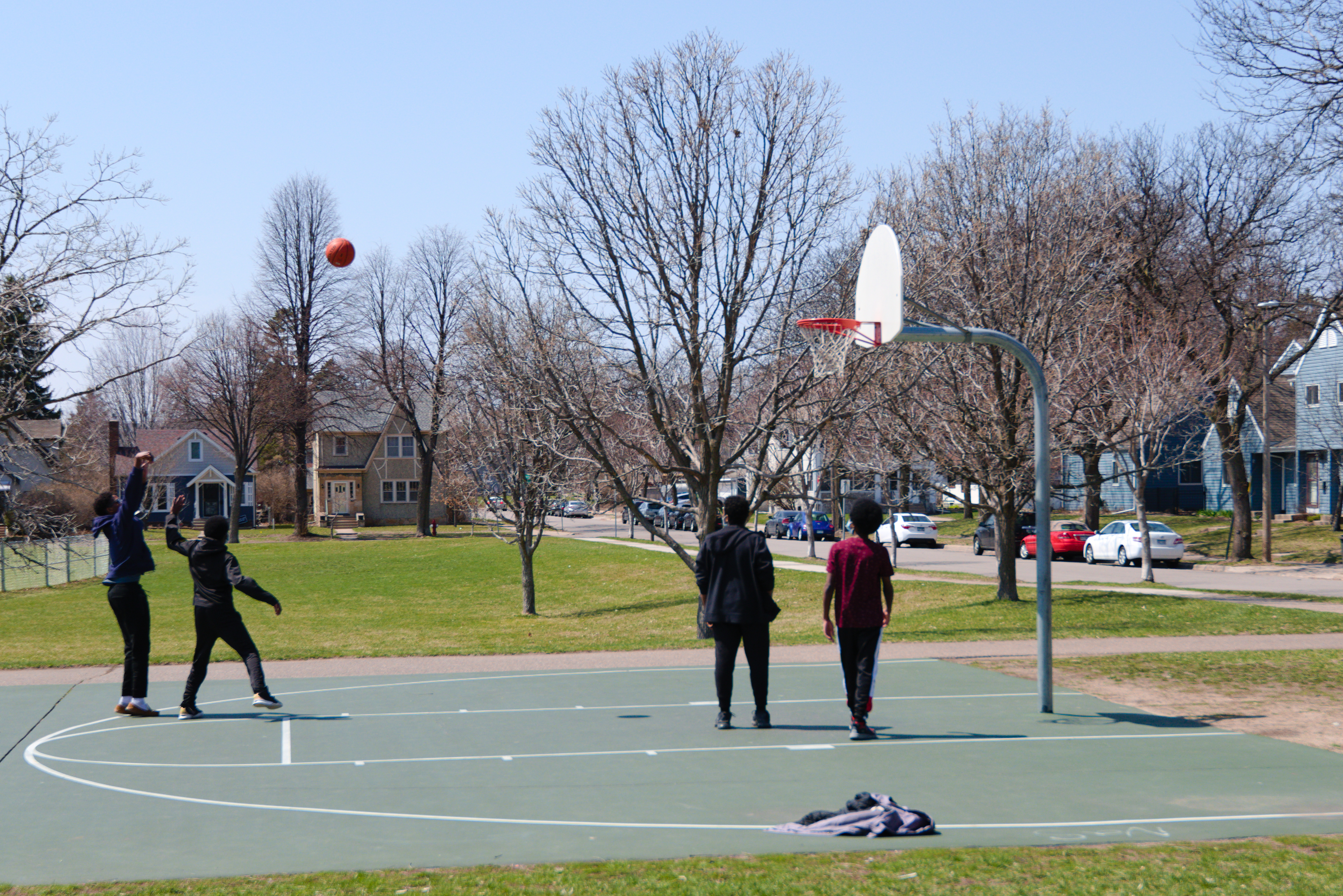
Basketball court

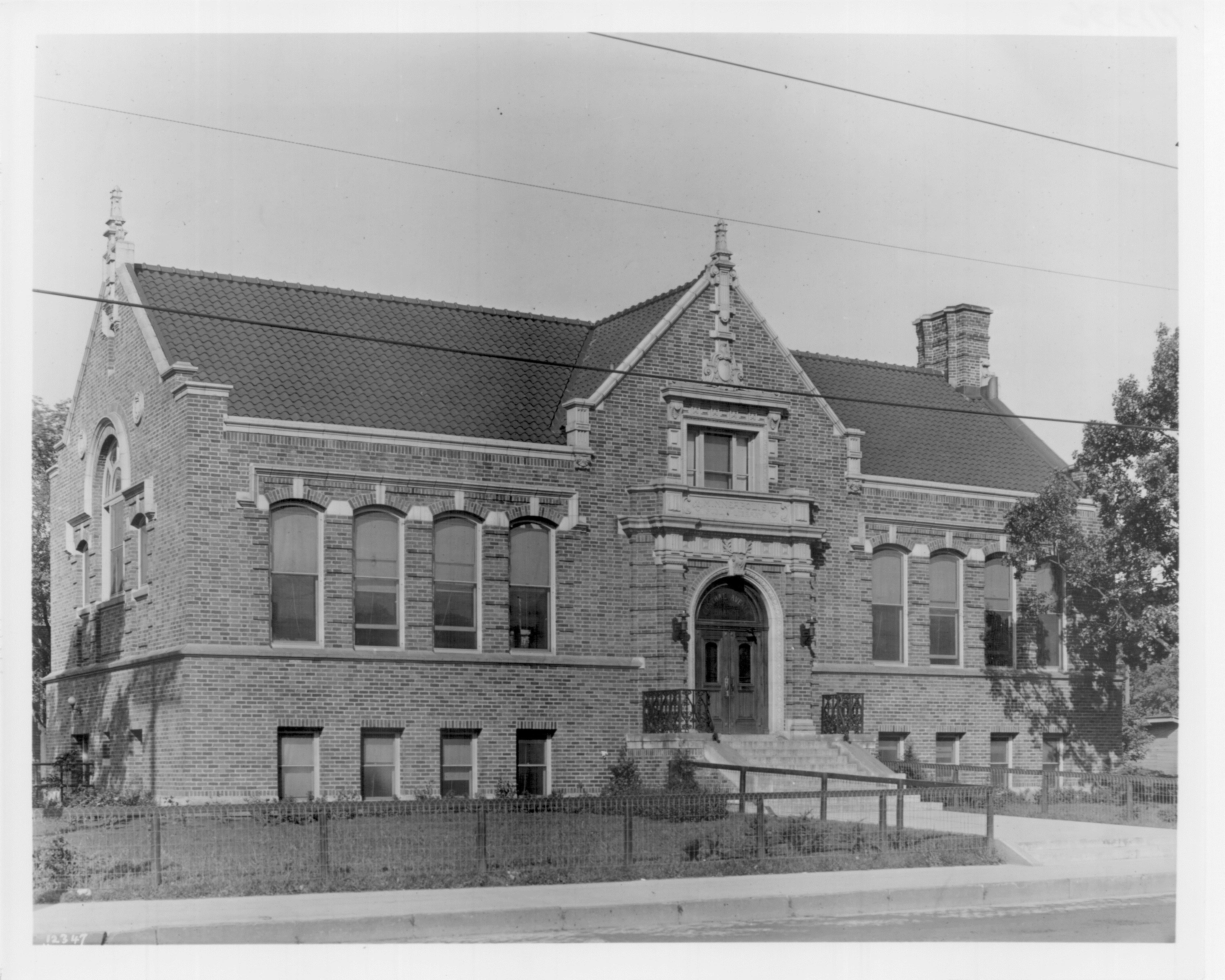
The former Central Avenue Branch of the Minneapolis Library, which stood from 1915 to 1972 before being razed to make way for a new building

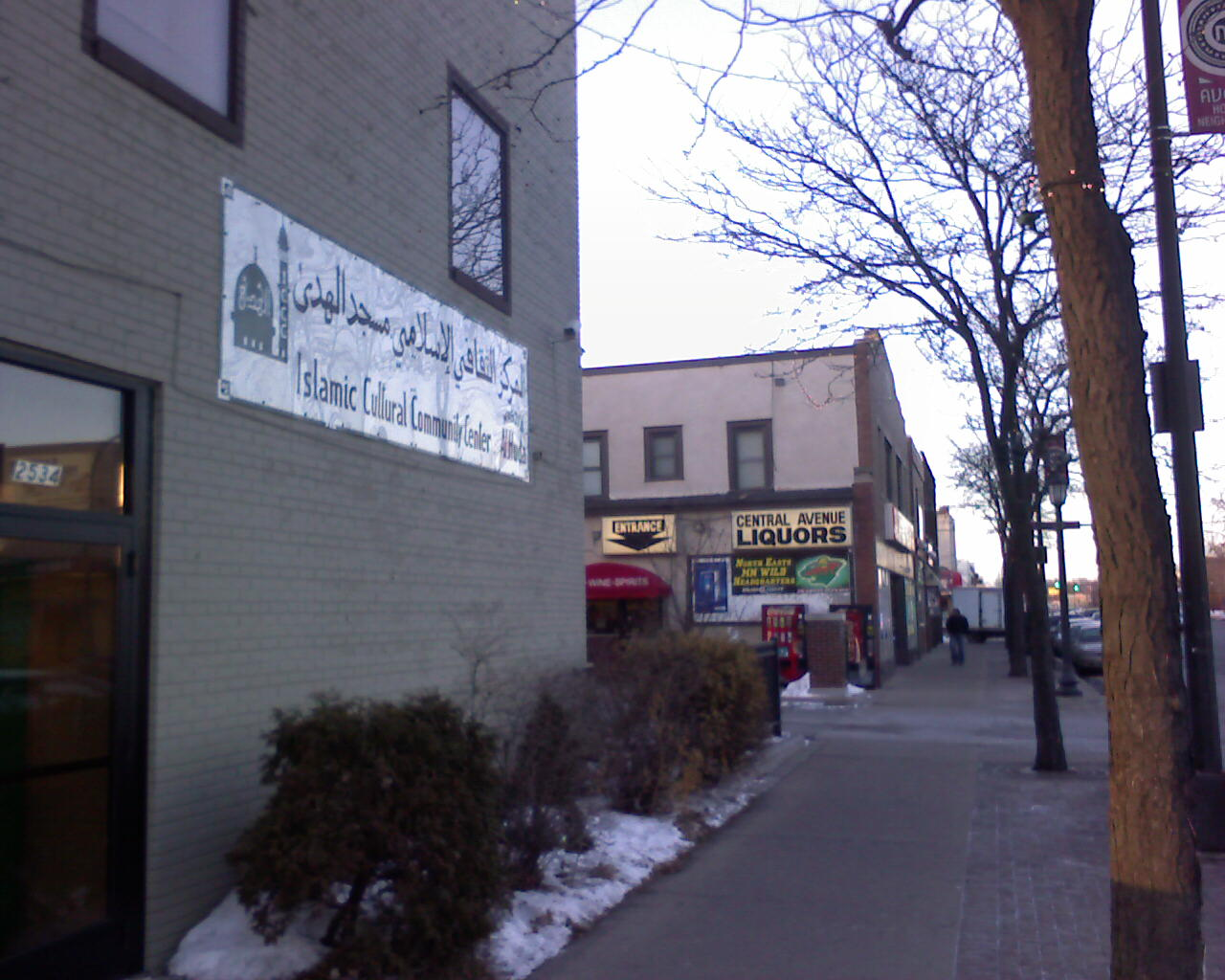
Islamic Cultural Community Center, next to Central Avenue Liquors

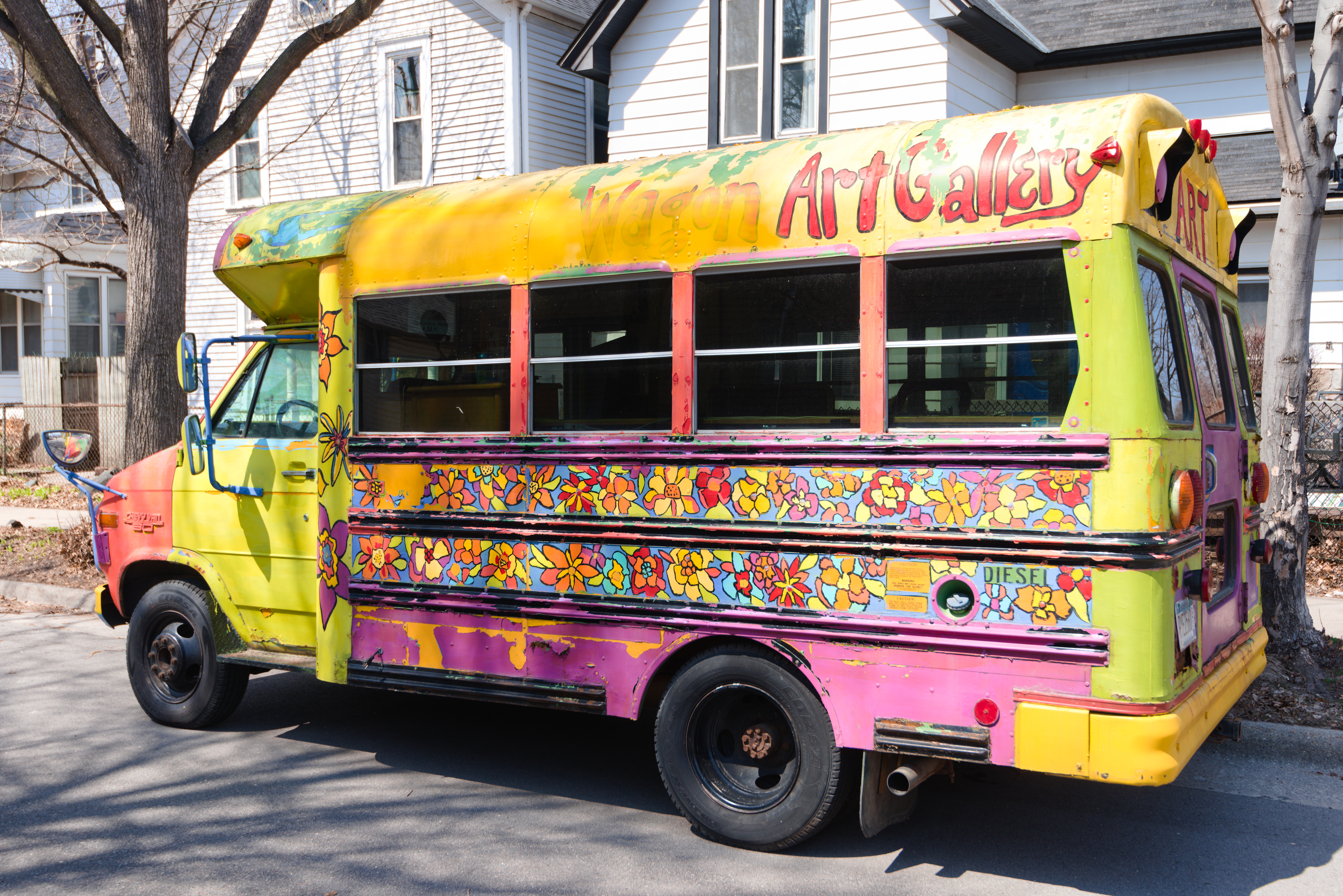
Art bus
