= Edison High School (Minnesota) =

High school in Minneapolis, Minnesota

Thomas Edison High School

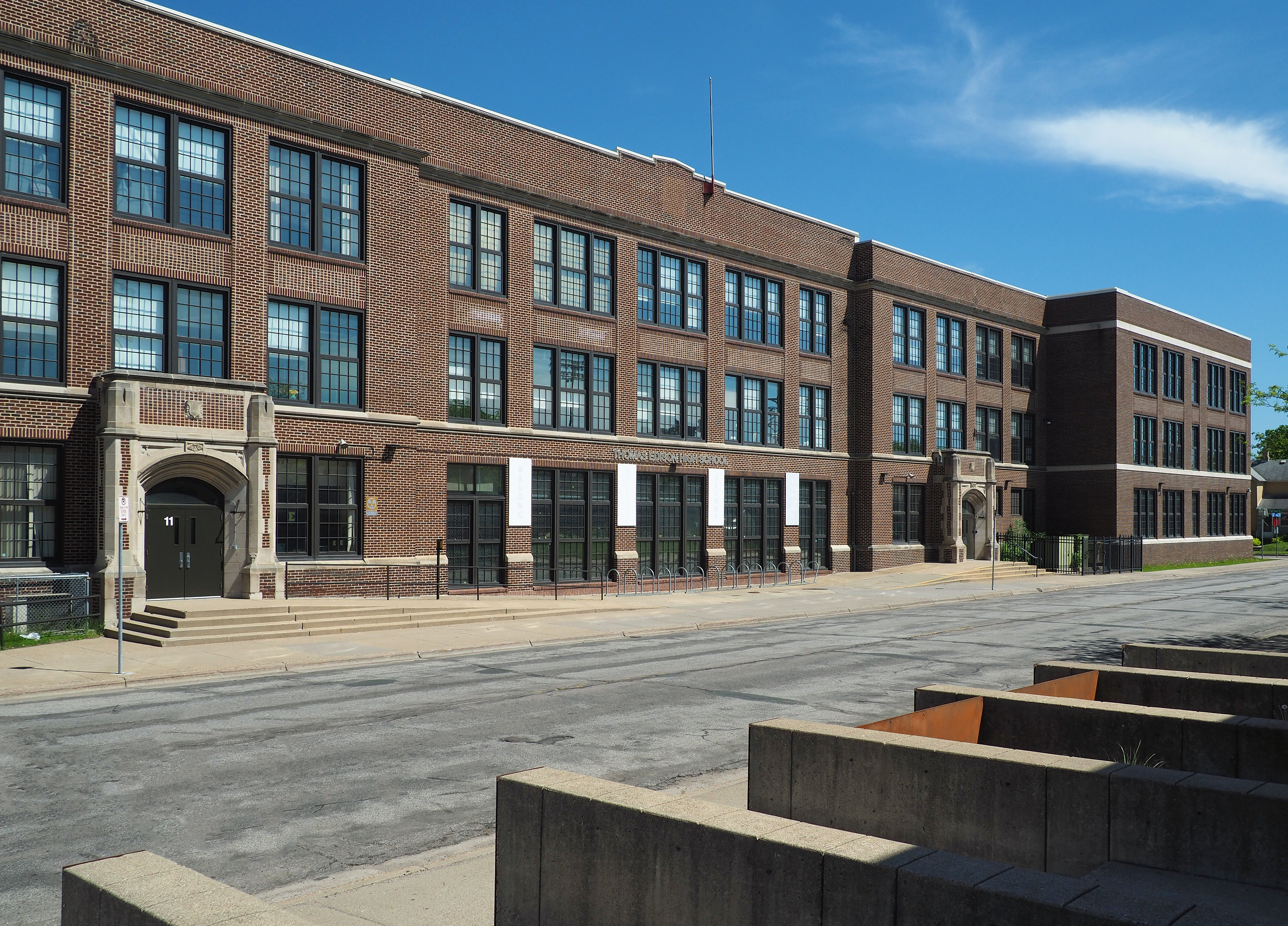
- Edison High School viewed from the northwest

Location
- 700 22nd Avenue Northeast; Minneapolis, Minnesota 55418; United States; 45°00′34″N 93°15′06″W

Information
- Type: Public secondary
- Motto: Belong, Believe, Become
- Established: 1922; 104 years ago
- School district: Minneapolis Public Schools
- Principal: Eryn Warne
- Teaching staff: 58.17 (on a FTE basis)
- Grades: 9–12
- Enrollment: 833 (2023-2024)
- Student to teacher ratio: 14.32
- Colors: Blue and Gold
- Athletics conference: Minneapolis City Conference
- Nickname: Tommies
- Newspaper: Edison Record
- Yearbook: Wizard
- Website: edison.mpls.k12.mn.us

Thomas Edison High School, or simply Edison High School, is a public high school in the Northeast community of Minneapolis, Minnesota, United States. It was named after the American inventor Thomas Edison. Located in the Holland neighborhood, the school's academic focus areas are: American Studies, Business Enterprise, Candidate International Baccalaureate Middle Years Programme, International Baccalaureate Diploma Programme, Personal Care & Therapeutic Services, and Technology & Multi Media.

The school opened in 1922. Additions have been made to the rear of the building, and a gymnasium was built across Monroe Street. The track and football field are behind this gym, and the school's baseball/softball field is in adjacent Jackson Square Park.

== Demographics ==
The demographic breakdown of the 958 students enrolled for 2017-18 was:

- Male - 50.0%
- Female - 50.0%
- Native American/Alaskan - 4.5%
- Asian/Pacific islanders - 5.2%
- Black - 53.0%
- Hispanic - 19.1%
- White - 16.7%
- Multiracial - 1.5%

72.1% of the students were eligible for free or reduced lunch.

== Athletics ==
Edison competes in the following sports, some in co-ops with other schools.

- Fall: Football (No team since 2023), Cross Country Running, Girls Tennis, Boys and Girls Soccer, Volleyball, Girls Swimming
- Winter: Dance Team, Wrestling, Boys Swimming, Boys and Girls Basketball, Gymnastics, Boys and Girls Hockey
- Spring: Track and Field, Boys Tennis, Baseball, Badminton, Softball, Boys and Girls Golf

== Notable alumni ==
- Alan Anderson, basketball player
- Don A. Anderson, Minnesota state senator
- John Billman, football player
- Don Carlson, basketball player
- Joe Dziedzic, professional hockey player
- Kari Dziedzic, Minnesota Senate Majority Leader, state senator
- Walt Dziedzic, Minneapolis city council member
- Stanley J. Fudro, Minnesota state representative, businessman, and toy inventor
- Tony Jaros, basketball player
- James C. Johnson, Guitarist for Gypsy
- Raymond J. Julkowski, Minnesota state representative and lawyer
- Harold Kalina, Minnesota State Senator, Minnesota District Court Judge
- Mesa Kincaid, radio personality
- Richard E. Kraus, Marine Corps Medal of Honor recipient
- John S. Kozlak, Minnesota state representative
- Diane Loeffler, Minnesota state representative
- Mike Mikulak, football player
- Charley “Shooter” Walters, former Minnesota Twins pitcher, current St. Paul Pioneer Press sports columnist
- Ilhan Omar, U.S. Representative
- Anne K. Stokowski, Minnesota state senator
- Eugene E. Stokowski, Minnesota state senator
- Clayton Tonnemaker, football player
