= Joseph A. Kozlak Sr. =

American lawyer, funeral director, and politician

Joseph A. Kozlak, Sr. (July 8, 1896 – August 14, 1966) was an American lawyer, funeral director, and politician.

Kozlak was born in Minneapolis, Minnesota. He went to Saint Thomas Academy and the University of Minnesota. He went to law school and was admitted to the Minnesota Bar. Kozlak was a funeral director. Kozlak served in the United States Army. He served in the Minnesota Senate from 1935 to 1938 and was a Democrat. Kozlak also served in the Minnesota House of Representatives from 1921 to 1922, 1925 to 1934, and 1941 to 1942. His son, John S. Kozlak also served in the Minnesota Legislature.
